= List of Boca Juniors head coaches =

Boca Juniors is an Argentine sports club that is notable for its professional football team. The chronological list comprises all those who have held the position of head coach since the start of the professional era in 1930. Each head coach's entry includes his career with the club and the titles won. Caretaker head coaches are included, where known, as well as those who have been in permanent charge.

The most successful head coach in terms of titles won is Carlos Bianchi with 9. Titles include 4 Primera División leagues, 3 Copa Libertadores, and 2 Intercontinental Cups between 1998 and 2003.

== Head coaches ==
- There are no statistics about the 1905–30 period so only head coaches since 1930 are listed below.
- In the case of interim coaches periods, they are not numbered as they were not official managers.

Keys

- indicates interim manager.

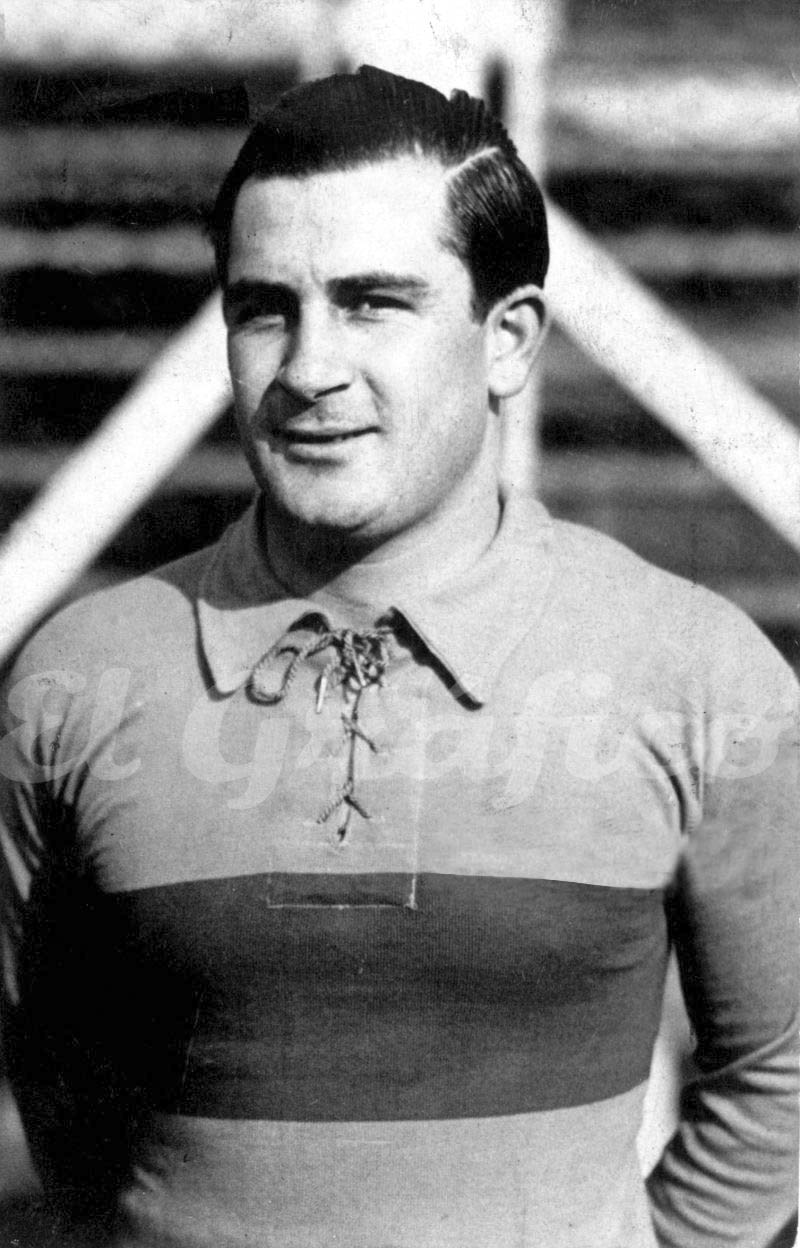
Mario Fortunato is ranked 2nd among the most winning coaches with 6 titles

N°	Name	Per.	Tenure	Titles
(no data for the 1905–1930 period)
1	(Argentina) Mario Fortunato (Note: Apart from the periods indicated, Fortunato was also head coach in the 1953 tour on Europe.)	1	1930–32	2
2	(Spain) José Lago Millán	1	1932	–
3	(Argentina) Ludovico Bidoglio	1	1933	–
–	(Argentina) Mario Fortunato	2	1934–36	2
4	(Argentina) Juan José Tramutola	1	1937–38	–
5	(Argentina) Enrique Sobral	1	1938	–
6	(Moldova) Valère de Besveconny	1	1939	–
7	(Argentina) Roberto Cherro	1	1939	–
8	(Argentina) Ángel Fernández Roca	1	1939–40	1
–	(Argentina) Enrique Sobral	2	1940–41	1
9	(Argentina) Carlos Calocero	1	1941	–
–	(Argentina) Mario Fortunato	3	1942	–
10	(Argentina) Oscar Tarrío	1	1942–43	–
11	(Argentina) Alfredo Garasini	1	1943–46	4
–	(Argentina) Mario Fortunato	4	1945–46	2
12	(Argentina) Eduardo González Pinto	1	1947	1
13	(Argentina) Julio Benavídez	1	1948	–
14	(Argentina) Renato Cesarini	1	1949	–
15	(Hungary) Franz Platko	1	1949–50	–
16	(Argentina) Ernesto Lazzatti	1	1950	–
17	(Argentina) Emilio Baldonedo	1	1951–52	–
18	(Argentina) Gerónimo Díaz	1	1953	–
19	(Hungary) György Orth	1	1953	–
–	(Argentina) Ernesto Lazzatti	2	1954	1
20	(Argentina) Jaime Sarlanga	1	1955	–
–	(Argentina) Mario Fortunato	5	1956	–
21	(Argentina) Bernardo Gandulla	1	1957–58	–
22	(Argentina) José Manuel Moreno	1	1958–59	–
23	(Argentina) Claudio Vacca	1	1959	–
24	(Argentina) Carlos Sosa	1	1960	–
25	(Argentina) José D'Amico (Note: He was originally part of the staff of Carlos Sosa, being appointed as coach when Sosa left the charge.)	1	1960	
26	(Brazil) Vicente Feola	1	1961	–
–	(Argentina) José D'Amico	2	1962–63	1
27	(Argentina) Adolfo Pedernera (Note: Pedernera was the main coach although it was Aristóbulo Deambrossi who was sitting on the bench during the matches.)	1	1963–65	1
28	(Argentina) Néstor Rossi (Note: Replaced Pedernera when he suffered an accident.)	1	1965–66	1
–	(Argentina) Bernardo Gandulla	2	1967	–
29	(Uruguay) Alcides Silveira (Note: Was both, football and manager at the same time.)	1	1967–68	–
–	(Argentina) José D'Amico	2	1968	–
30	(Argentina) Alfredo Di Stéfano	1	1969	2
31	(Argentina) José María Silvero	1	1970–71	1
–	(Argentina) Bernardo Gandulla	3	1971	–
32	(Chile) Fernando Riera	1	1971–72	–
–	(Argentina) Bernardo Gandulla	4	1972	–
33	(Argentina) José Varacka	1	1972	–
34	(Argentina) Rogelio Domínguez	1	1973–75	–
–	(Argentina) Bernardo Gandulla	5	1975	–
35	(Argentina) Juan Carlos Lorenzo	1	1976–79	5
36	(Argentina) Antonio Rattín	1	1980	–
37	(Argentina) Silvio Marzolini	1	1981	1
38	(Argentina) Vladislao Cap	1	1982	–
39	(Argentina) Carmelo Faraone	1	1982–83	–
–	(Argentina) Raúl Rodríguez Seoane	1	1983	–
–	(Argentina) Ernesto Grillo	1	1983	–
40	(Argentina) Miguel Ángel López	1	1983–84	–
41	(Brazil) Dino Sani	1	1984	–
–	(Argentina) Ernesto Grillo	1	1984	–
–	(Argentina) Mario Zanabria	1	1984	–
–	(Argentina) Alfredo Di Stéfano	2	1985	–
42	(Argentina) Mario Zanabria	1	1985–86	–
43	(Argentina) César Luis Menotti	1	1986–87	–
44	(Argentina) Roberto Saporiti	1	1987	–
–	(Argentina) Juan Carlos Lorenzo	2	1987	–
45	(Argentina) José Omar Pastoriza	1	1988–89	–
46	(Argentina) Carlos Aimar	1	1989–90	2
–	(Argentina) Osvaldo Potente	1	1990	–
47	(Uruguay) Óscar Tabárez	1	1991–93	2
–	(Argentina) Osvaldo Potente	1	1993	–
48	(Argentina) Jorge Habegger	1	1993	1
–	(Argentina) Enrique Hrabina	1	1993	–
–	(Argentina) César Luis Menotti	2	1993–94	–
–	(Argentina) Enrique Hrabina	1	1994	–
–	(Argentina) Silvio Marzolini	2	1995	–
49	(Argentina) Carlos Bilardo	1	1996	–
–	(Argentina) Francisco Sá	1	1996	–
50	(Argentina) Héctor Veira	1	1996–98	–
–	(Argentina) Carlos García Cambón	1	1998	–
51	(Argentina) Carlos Bianchi	1	1998–01	6
–	(Uruguay) Oscar Tabárez	2	2001–02	–
–	(Argentina) Carlos Bianchi	2	2002–04	3
–	(Argentina) Abel Alves	1	2004	–
52	(Argentina) Miguel Ángel Brindisi	1	2004	–
53	(Argentina) Jorge Benítez	1	2004–05	1
–	(Argentina) Abel Alves	1	2005	–
54	(Argentina) Alfio Basile	1	2005–06	5
55	(Argentina) Ricardo Lavolpe	1	2006	–
56	(Argentina) Miguel Ángel Russo	1	2007	1
57	(Argentina) Carlos Ischia	1	2008–09	2
–	(Argentina) Abel Alves	1	2009	–
–	(Argentina) Alfio Basile	2	2009–10	–
58	(Argentina) Abel Alves (Note: After several previous tenures as interim, he was officially appointed for this period.)	1	2010	
–	(Argentina) Roberto Pompei	1	2010	–
59	(Argentina) Claudio Borghi	1	2010	–
–	(Argentina) Roberto Pompei	1	2010	–
60	(Argentina) Julio Falcioni	1	2010–12	2
–	(Argentina) Carlos Bianchi	3	2012–14	–
–	(Argentina) Hugo Ibarra (Note: Pairing with Sergio Saturno.)	1	2014	–
61	(Argentina) Rodolfo Arruabarrena	1	2014–16	2
62	(Argentina) Guillermo Barros Schelotto	1	2016–18	2
63	(Argentina) Gustavo Alfaro	1	2019–20	1
–	(Argentina) Miguel Ángel Russo	2	2020–21	2
64	(Argentina) Sebastian Battaglia	1	2021–22	2
65	(Argentina) Hugo Ibarra (Note: First as interim, then officially appointed in the same period.)	1	2022–23	2
–	(Argentina) Mariano Herrón	–	2023	–
66	(Argentina) Jorge Almirón	1	2023	–
67	(Argentina) Diego Martínez	1	2024	–
–	(Argentina) Mariano Herrón	–	2024	–
68	(Argentina) Fernando Gago	1	2024–25	–
–	(Argentina) Mariano Herrón	–	2025	–
–	(Argentina) Miguel Ángel Russo	3	2025	–
69	(Argentina) Claudio Úbeda	1	2025–26	–
–	(Argentina) Rodolfo Arruabarrena	2	2026–	–

== Winning managers ==
Name	Titles	Details
Carlos Bianchi	9	1998 Apertura, 1999 Clausura, 2000 Apertura, 2003 Apertura, 2000 Copa Libertadores, 2001 Copa Libertadores, 2003 Copa Libertadores, 2000 Intercontinental Cup, 2003 Intercontinental Cup
Mario Fortunato	6	1930, 1931, 1934, 1935, 1946 Copa Competencia Británica, 1946 Copa Escobar-Gerona
Juan Carlos Lorenzo	5	1976 Metropolitano, 1976 Nacional, 1977 Copa Libertadores, 1978 Copa Libertadores, 1977 Intercontinental Cup
Alfio Basile	5	2005 Apertura, 2006 Clausura, 2005 Copa Sudamericana, 2005 Recopa Sudamericana, 2006 Recopa Sudamericana
Alfredo Garasini	3	1943, 1944, 1945 Copa Escobar-Gerona
Miguel Angel Russo	3	2007 Copa Libertadores, 2019–20, 2020 Copa LPF
Enrique Sobral	2	1940, 1940 Copa Ibarguren
Alfredo Di Stéfano	2	1969 Nacional, 1969 Copa Argentina
Carlos Aimar	2	1989 Supercopa Sudamericana, 1990 Recopa Sudamericana
Óscar Tabárez	2	1992 Apertura, 1992 Supercopa Masters
Carlos Ischia	2	2008 Apertura, 2008 Recopa Sudamericana
Julio Falcioni	2	2011 Apertura, 2012 Copa Argentina
Rodolfo Arruabarrena	2	2015, 2015 Copa Argentina
Guillermo Barros Schelotto	2	2016–17, 2017–18
Sebastián Battaglia	2	2019–20 Copa Argentina, 2022 Copa LPF
Hugo Ibarra	2	2022, 2022 Supercopa Argentina
Eduardo González Pinto	1	1944 Copa Ibarguren
Ernesto Lazzatti	1	1954
José D'Amico	1	1962
Aristóbulo Deambrossi	1	1964
Néstor Rossi	1	1965
José María Silvero	1	1970 Nacional
Silvio Marzolini	1	1981 Metropolitano
Jorge Habegger	1	1993 Copa de Oro
Jorge Benítez	1	2004 Copa Sudamericana
Gustavo Alfaro	1	2018 Supercopa Argentina
