= 1944 Copa de Competencia Británica Final =

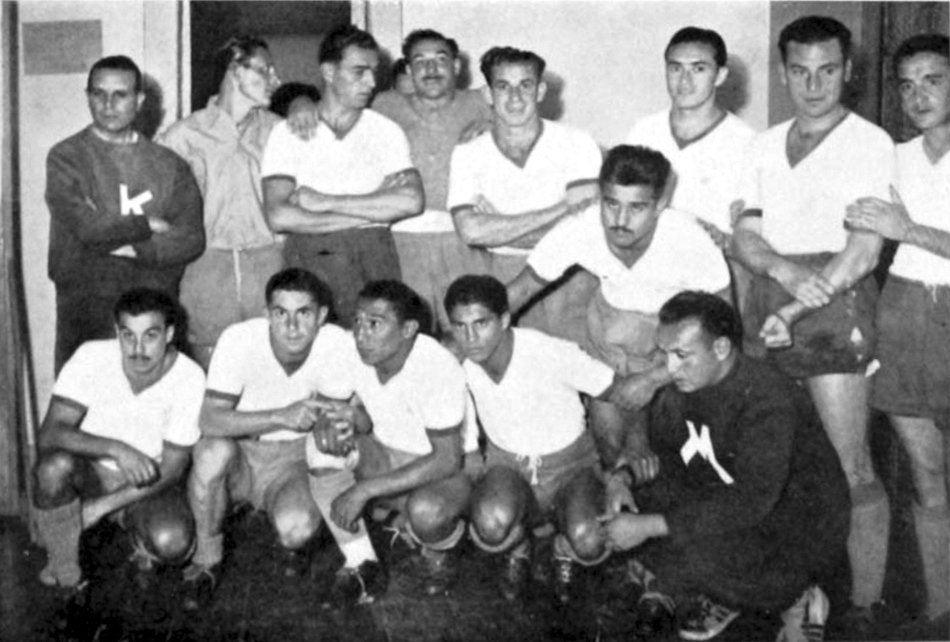
- Huracán, champions
- Event: Copa de Competencia Británica
Huracán	Boca Juniors
4	2
- Date: December 9, 1944
- Venue: Estadio de San Lorenzo, Buenos Aires
- Referee: Bartolomé Macías

The 1944 Copa de Competencia Británica Final was the final that decided the winner of the 1st. edition of this Argentine domestic cup. It was played on December 9, 1944. Huracán defeated Boca Juniors 4–2 at San Lorenzo Stadium, winning their first Copa Británica trophy.

== Qualified teams ==
Team	Previous finals app.
Huracán	(none)
Boca Juniors	(none)

== Overview ==
The cup was contested by the same 16 clubs participating in 1944 Argentine Primera División, playing a single-elimination format in a neutral venue. Huracán eliminated Vélez Sarsfield 2–1, arch-rival San Lorenzo 4–3, and Newell's Old Boys 4–1 in semifinal.

On the other hand, Boca Juniors defeated Racing 3–2 (in Boedo), Banfield 4–2 (also in Boedo), and Platense 1–0 in the semifinal held in Villa Crespo.

In the final, Huracán defeated Boca Juniors 4–2 to win their first Copa Británica trophy. Boca Juniors players Natalio Pescia and Mario Boyé were sent off.

== Road to the final ==
- all matches played in neutral venues

Some players of Boca Juniors in the locker room before entering the pitch

Huracán		Round	Boca Juniors	
Opponent	Result	Group stage	Opponent	Result
Vélez Sarsfield	2–1	First round	Racing	3–2
San Lorenzo	4–3	Quarterfinal	Banfield	4–2
Newell's Old Boys	4–1	Semifinal	Platense	1–0

== Match details ==
1944 Copa de Competencia Británica Final
December 9, 1944

Huracán	4–2	Boca Juniors
Méndez 5'; Pescia 34' (o.g.); Simes 50', 73'	Report	Boyé 61'; Sarlanga 68'

Estadio de San Lorenzo, Buenos Aires
Referee: Bartolomé Macías

Huracán	Boca Juniors

GK	(Argentina) Bruno Barrionuevo
DF	(Argentina) Adolfo Gilli
DF	(Argentina) Orlando Espeche
MF	(Argentina) Horacio Redondo
MF	(Argentina) Manuel Giúdice
MF	(Argentina) Roberto Sbarra
FW	(Argentina) Julio A. Rosales
FW	(Argentina) Norberto Méndez
FW	(Paraguay) Atilio Mellone
FW	(Argentina) Llamil Simes
FW	(Uruguay) Plácido Rodríguez
Manager:
(Argentina) José Laguna

GK
DF
DF
MF
MF
MF
FW
FW
FW
FW
FW
Manager:
(Argentina) Alfredo Garasini

(Argentina) Claudio Vacca
(Argentina) José M. Marante	(substituted off) 46'
(Argentina) Víctor Valussi
(Argentina) Carlos A. Sosa
(Argentina) Ernesto Lazzatti
(Argentina) Natalio Pescia	(red card) 51'
(Argentina) Mario Boyé	(red card) 89'
(Argentina) Pío Corcuera
(Argentina) Jaime Sarlanga
(Uruguay) Severino Varela
(Argentina) Alberto Lijé
