= Ernesto Lazzatti =

Argentine footballer and sports journalist

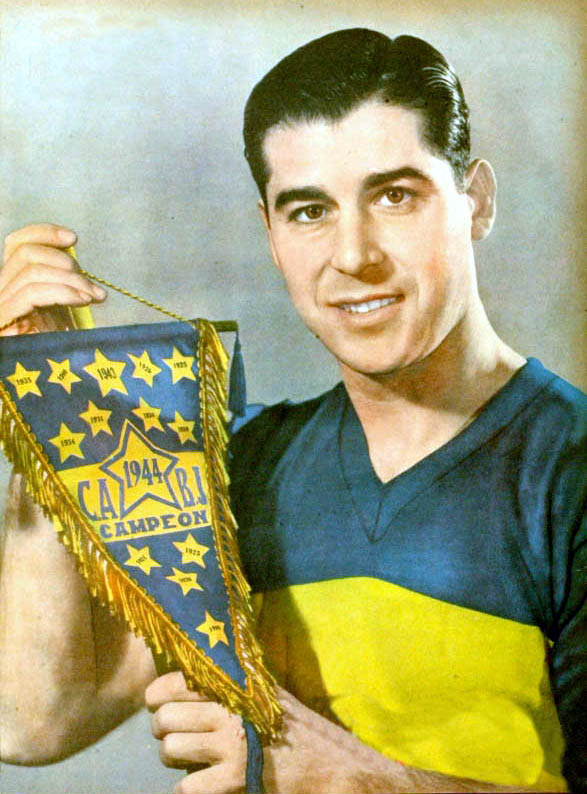
- Lazzatti in 1945

Personal information
- Date of birth: 25 September 1915
- Place of birth: Bahía Blanca, Argentina
- Date of death: 30 December 1988 (aged 73)
- Position: Midfielder

Youth career
- 1924–1933: Puerto Comercial

Senior career*
Years	Team	Apps	(Gls)
1934–1947	Boca Juniors	379	(16)
1947–1948	Danubio	50	(0)

International career
1936–1937	Argentina	4	(0)

Managerial career
- 1950: Boca Juniors
- 1954: Boca Juniors
Medal record
Men's football
Representing Argentina
Copa América
Winner	1937 Argentina
- * Club domestic league appearances and goals

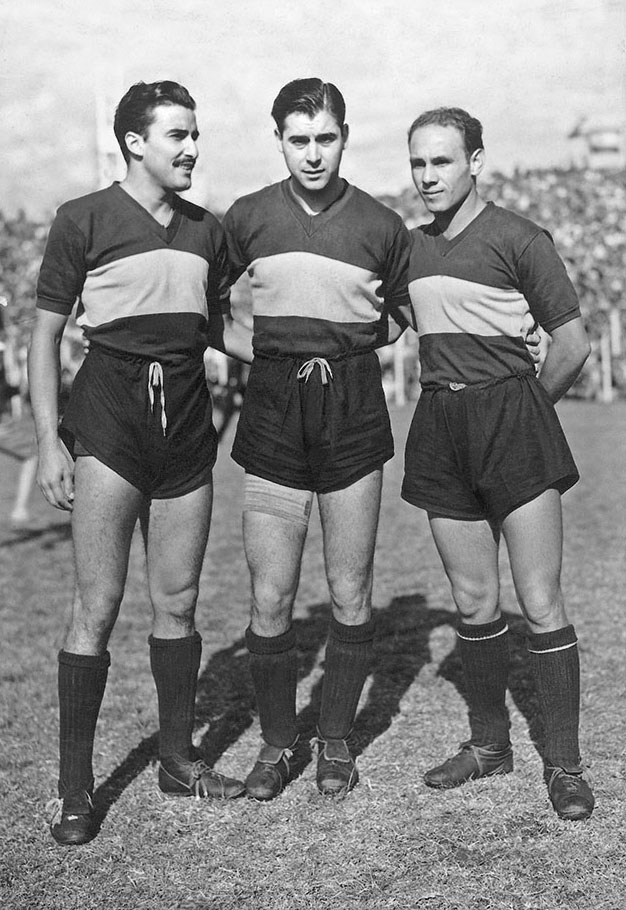
Carlos Sosa, Lazzatti and Natalio Pescia, the midfield line of Boca Juniors in the 1940s and one of the most remembered in the history of the club

Ernesto Lazzatti (25 September 1915 – 30 December 1988) was an Argentine football midfielder and sports journalist. As a player, he won 10 titles with Boca Juniors, the only Argentine team where he played. Lazzatti's position on the field was central midfielder, being notable for his skills with the ball and elegant style of playing. In 503 official matches played, Lazzatti was never sent off.

Nicknamed El Pibe de Oro (The Golden Kid), Lazzatti is considered one of Boca Juniors's greatest idols, having raised from the youth divisions with a long career in the club. Lazzatti also won a title as manager in 1954.

== Biography ==
Lazzatti was born in Bahía Blanca, but he grew up in the neighboring city of Ingeniero White, where he played in local club Puerto Comercial as right inside forward. Santos Ursino was the central midfielder and captain of that team and then became his adviser. After a representative of Boca Juniors (who was also Lazzatti's uncle) wrote a letter to the club recommending Ernesto, the club decided to pay the cost of travel to bring Lazzatti to Buenos Aires by train. At 18 years old, the young promise arrived to the club and played three matches (a friendly one and two in the reserve team) before debuting in the senior squad in 1934, when Boca beat Chacarita Juniors by 3–2 on April 8.

I had no expectations of being a professional footballer. I know I was fortunate because thousand of letters were sent to the club (Boca Juniors) each day, and they just picked my uncle's one and decided to pay attention to it.

— Ernesto Lazzatti in an interview

In the year of his debut, Boca Juniors (managed by Mario Fortunato) was champion, with 101 goals scored in 39 games. Lazzatti was the central midfielder alongside Enrique Vernieres and Pedro Arico Suárez. In 1935 Boca won another championship.

Lazzatti played only four matches for the Argentina national team between 1936 and 1937. He was part of the squad that won the 1937 Copa América when Argentina beat Brazil by 2–0 in the final at Estadio Gasómetro. Lazzatti was part of the midfield line along with Antonio Sastre and Celestino Martínez.

In Boca Juniors, Lazzatti formed a midfield line with Carlos Sosa and Natalio Pescia in the squad that won the 1943 and 1944 championships. River Plate's La Máquina was active during this period, and the Boca team is sometimes regarded as one of the club's best teams ever.

Lazzatti played a total of 14 seasons in Boca Juniors, totalizing 503 matches and 7 goals scored. He was never sent off in his whole career. When he became a free agent at the age of 32, Lazzatti refused to play for other team in Argentina, so Uruguayan player and former teammate Severino Varela offered him to play at Danubio. Lazzatti accepted and joined the club, playing there until his retirement in 1948 at 33 years old. His performances were praised by Uruguayan media, remarking that "his quality is as expected".

After his tenure on Uruguay, Lazzatti returned to Argentina becoming manager of Boca Juniors in 1950. The team was runner-up to Racing Club but he resigned after a conflict with an executive of the club. Far from football environment, Lazzatti opened a car dealership in Temperley, working there until Boca Juniors called him to take over the team in 1954. With Lazzatti as manager, Boca Juniors won a title after a decade without league championships. With players such as Julio Musimessi, Eliseo Mouriño, Pescia, José Borello, Boca set a record of attendance, with an average of 30,000 spectators per match, selling a total of 900,000 tickets during the tournament, which remains as the highest record in Primera División.

Despite that success, he never returned to management, pursuing a career in sport journalism, working in El Gráfico when the magazine was directed by Dante Panzeri. When Panzeri left in 1962, Lazzatti followed him. Nevertheless, Lazzatti continued his career as journalist writing for newspaper La Prensa and in the TV show Deporte con Opinión in Canal 7.

== Titles ==
=== Player ===
Boca Juniors

- Primera División (5): 1934, 1935, 1940, 1943, 1944
- Copa Ibarguren (2): 1940, 1944
- Copa de Competencia Británica (1): 1946
- Copa Escobar-Gerona (2): 1945, 1946

Argentina

- Copa América (1): 1937

=== Manager ===
Boca Juniors

- Primera División (1): 1954

== Quotes ==
I have fond memories of Lazzatti. He knew how to led the team because of his football abilities and ethics. He took over the midfield line, always playing with the head up. Not only his short and long passes were perfect, he was a great header as well.

— Claudio Vacca

He was one of the great centrojás (Note: Argentine idiom for "Centre-half", or central midfielder) of Argentine football. His distinctive style was fair play, intelligence and quality. A man with no great ball control but who knew how to pass the ball in the right moment. He didn't argue or play hard but he knew how to organise the team, being also an excellent person according to my personal experience and what my fellowmates told about him

— Rinaldo Martino
