= 1951 Argentine Primera División finals =

1951 Primera División finals
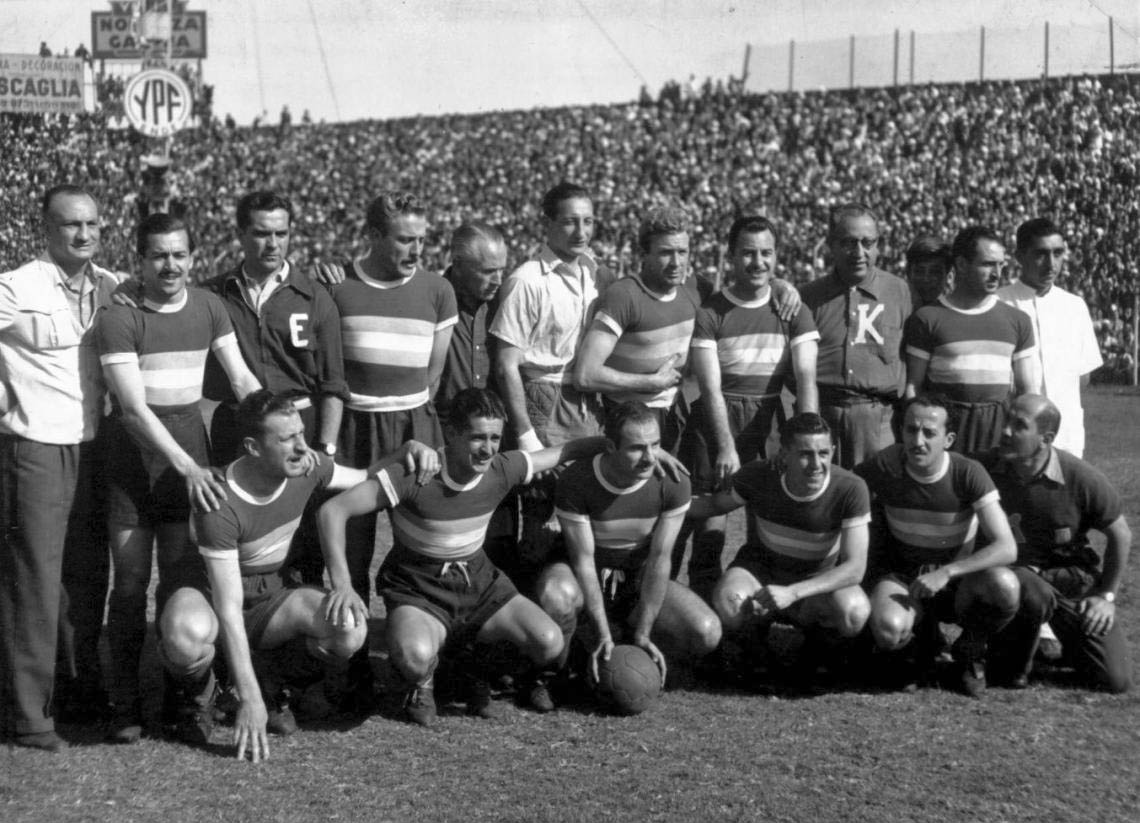
- Racing Club, champions
- Event: 1951 Primera División
Racing	Banfield
1	0
- on goal difference aggregate

First leg
Racing	Banfield
0	0
- Date: 1 Dec 1951
- Venue: San Lorenzo Stadium, Buenos Aires
- Referee: Ernest Wilbraham

Second leg
Banfield	Racing
0	1
- Date: 5 Dec 1951
- Venue: San Lorenzo Stadium, Buenos Aires
- Man of the Match: Mario Boyé
- Referee: Bentley Cross

The 1951 Argentine Primera División finals were the matches that determined the winner of 1951 season of Argentine Primera División. The series were contested by Racing and Banfield, in order to decide a champion after both teams had finished tied on points (44 points in 32 matches played) at the end of the tournament. Although Banfield finished the season with a better goal difference (+30) than Racing (+23) the Argentine Football Association committee decided that playoffs should be held in order to crown a champion.

It was the 3rd. league final contested by Racing (had won championships in 1913 and 1915, both vs San Isidro) and the 1st. played by Banfield.

The matches were played in neutral venue (San Lorenzo de Alamgro Stadium) under a two-legged tie format. Racing won 1–0 on aggregate becoming Primera División champions therefore earning their 12th. league title. Besides, it was first time Racing won three consecutive titles after football became professional in Argentina.

== Qualified teams ==
Team	Previous finals app.
Racing	**1913**, **1915**
Banfield	(none)

Bold indicates winning years

== Venue ==
Buenos Aires
San Lorenzo Stadium
Capacity: **47,000**
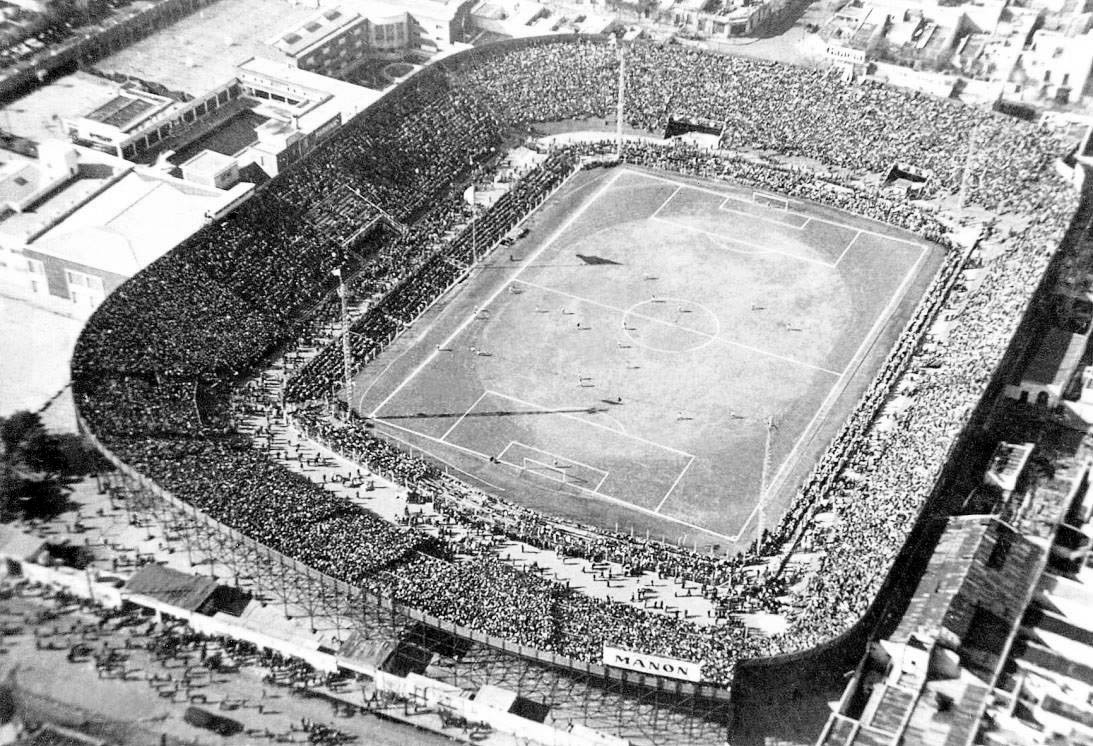

== Background ==
Racing, coached by Guillermo Stábile, had previously won the 1949 and 1950 titles and aimed at winning their third consecutive championship. Racing and Banfield finished the season tied on points (44). Racing had also scored 60 goals and only received 37 within 32 matches played.

For the 1951 tournament, the two-time champions Racing Club acquired goalkeeper Héctor Grisetti from Banfield, Luis Cesáreo from Boca Juniors, and Juan Carlos Giménez from Huracán. Racing started the tournament with poor results but improved taking advantage of, among other opportunities, a championship hiatus due to the Argentine national team's tour of Europe, where the side played against England for the first time. That match became memorable so Vélez Sarsfield's goalkeeper, Miguel Ángel Rugilo, earned the nickname "the lion of Wembley" after an outstanding performance.

On the other side, Banfield had made a great campaign, with highlighted wins over arch-rival Lanús (2–1 and 3–1), and beating all the big five teams, San Lorenzo (3–0), Boca Juniors (2–1), River Plate (5–1 at Estadio Monumental) and Independiente (5–0).

== Political influence ==
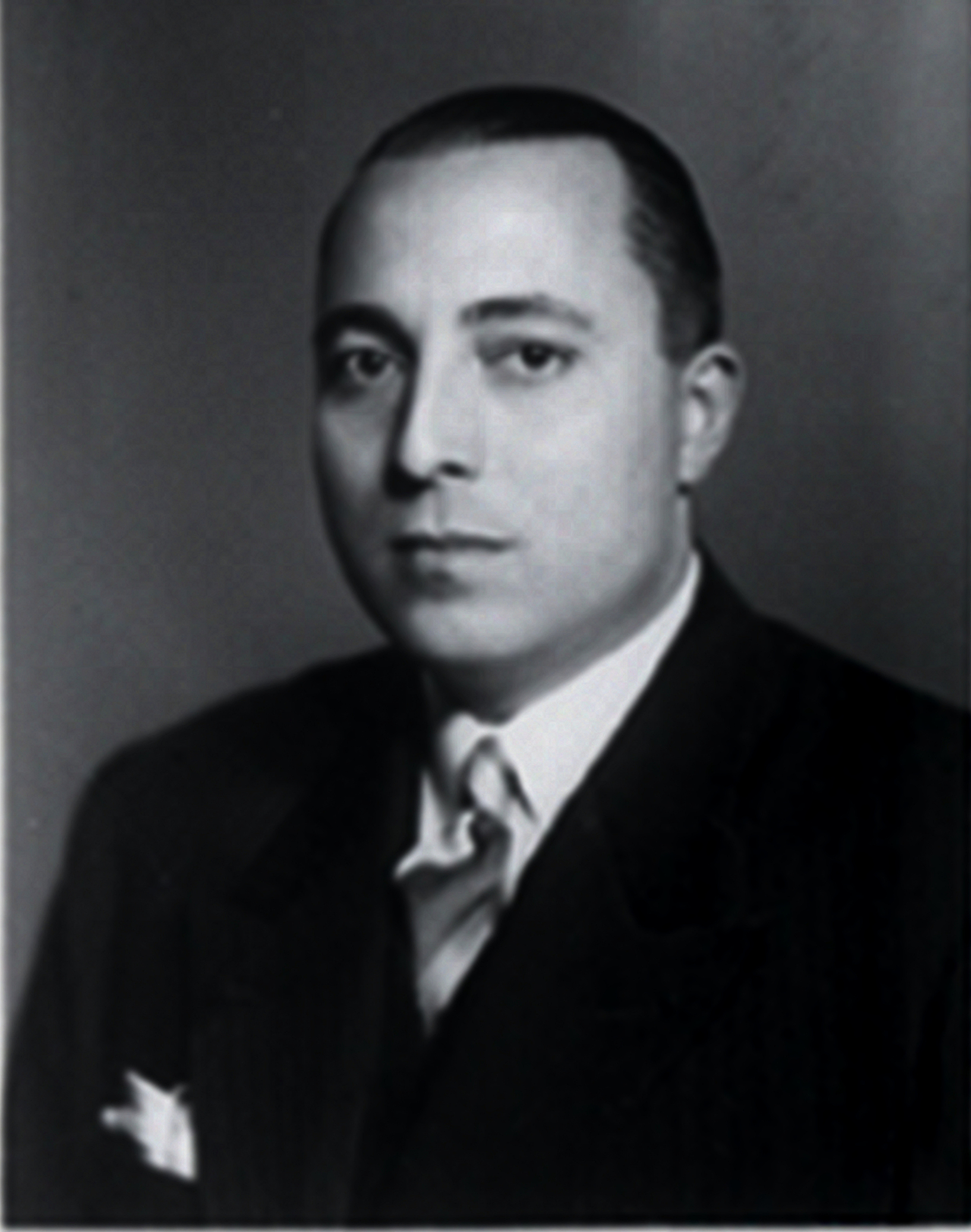
Minister of Treasury Ramón A. Cereijo had a strong influence on Racing Club and was often accused of favouring the institution

It was notable how the 1951 final was politised by peronism, referring to it as a struggle between "the poor (Banfield) against the rich (Racing)". That was because Racing Club was a powerful institution (in fact, part of the big five) in opposition to Banfield's more modest budget.

The pro-government press wanted to demonstrate that social justice had also reached sports. This journalistic campaign pitted Cereijo (Minister of Treasury and a Racing fan) against Perón's wife Eva Duarte, who was not much into football, but sought advice to determine which of the two clubs was the more modest because it was the team she wanted to win the championship... President of Argentina Juan Perón was associated with Racing because the Avellaneda club had indirectly been the most favored team during Peronism. "In reality, the one who favored him in reality wasn't Perón, but rather his Minister of Finance, Ramón Cereijo, a Racing fan. That government was the first to make sports a state policy,

— historian Víctor Raffo about the political influence on the final.

Moreover, Duarte had expressed her wish that Banfield was crowned champion after being questioned by sports journalist Enzo Ardigó, who let her know which of both teams was the most modest. Her wish carried a message about her political ideology that implied "in the 'peronist Argentina' the poor win". Moreover, Duarte sent Raúl Apold (president's secretariat of press) to meet the Banfield players, promising them a car would be gifted to each one in case of winning the final.

On the other hand, Racing was the reigning champion and was also seen as "the government's team" due to the great influence of Ministry of Treasury Ramón Cereijo, who was not only a Racing fan and honorary member of the club but one of the promoters of the construction of El Cilindro (inaugurated in September 1950 and named "Presidente Perón"). Cereijo had got a very low rates loan to build the stadium. Other moved from Cereijo to favour Racing included an investment to hire striker Mario Boyé (then playing in Europe), and the entry of Racing players to the Ministry of Treasury personnel.

His influence was so strong that rival supporters referred to Racing as Sportivo Cereijo. Cereijo had promised Racing Club players to give a brand new car to every one of them if they won the championship.

Other source affirms that Perón himself let Cereijo know about the desirability of a Banfield victory over Racing. Duarte was battling with a terminal cancer and Perón's requirement was in order to fulfil his wife's wish.

I'm going to tell you the truth, the order is for Banfield to win, but you do what you want.

— Ramón Cereijo at Racing dressing room before the second leg.

== Details ==
=== First leg ===
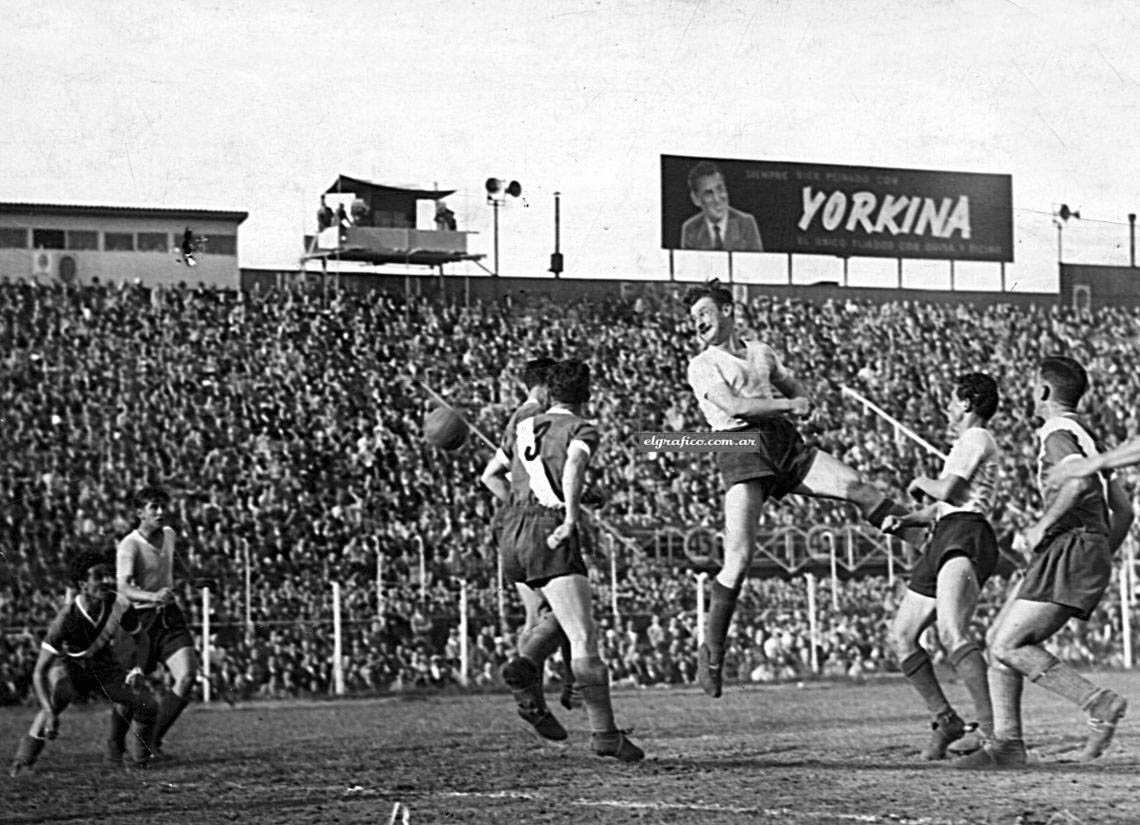
Boyé jumping for the ball

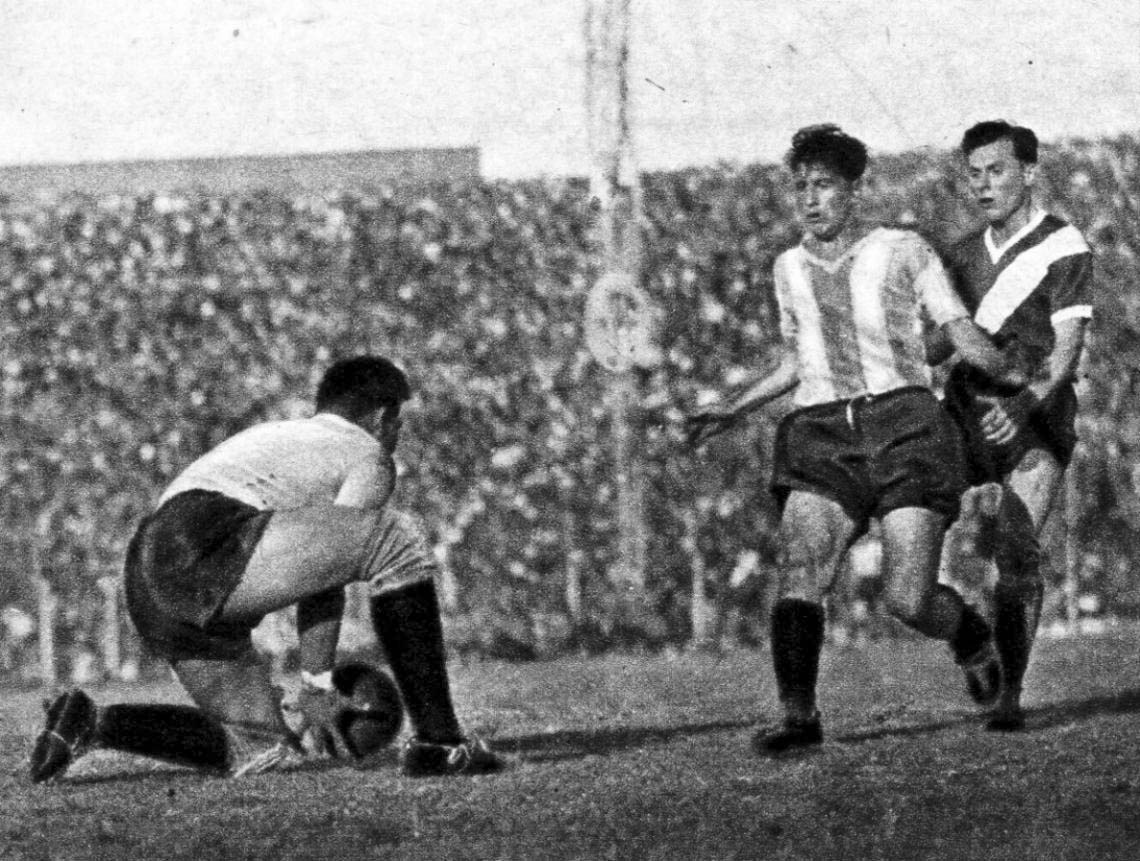
Goalkeeper Grisetti

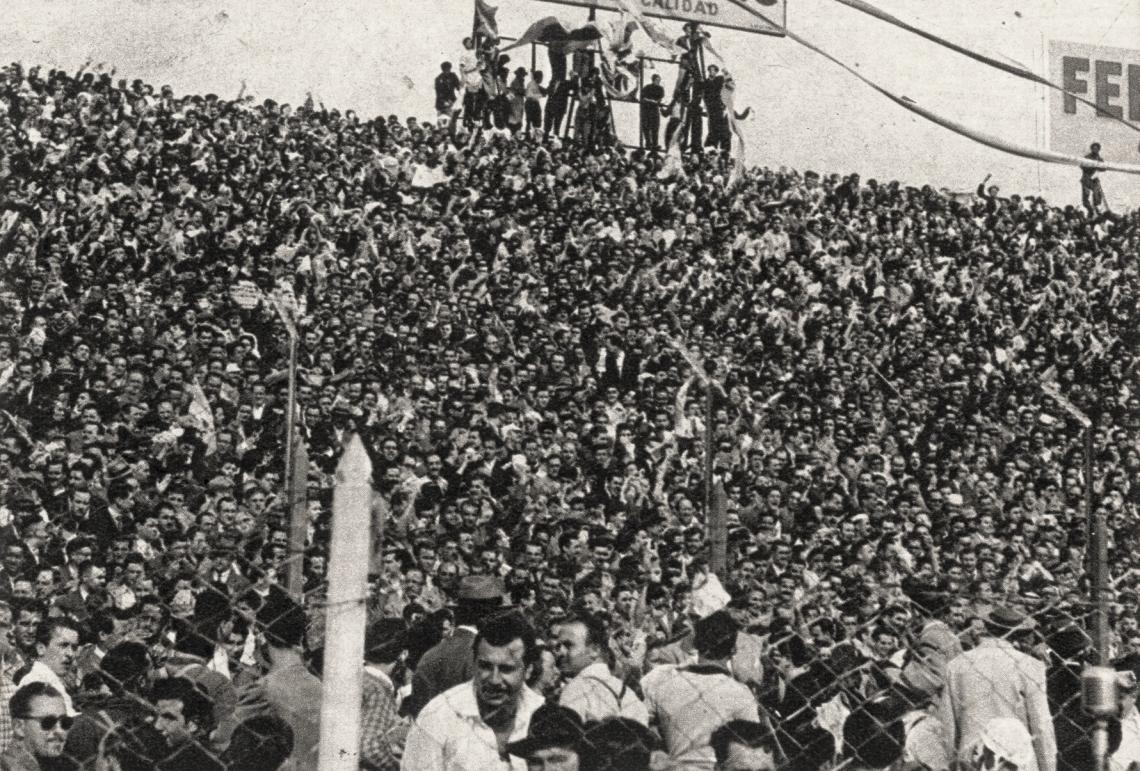
The crowd at San Lorenzo

1951 Primera División finals
1 Dec 1951
First leg

Racing	0–0	Banfield
	Report

San Lorenzo Stadium, Buenos Aires
Referee: Ernest Wilbraham (England)

**Racing**
**Banfield**

GK		(Argentina) Héctor Grisetti
DF		(Argentina) Higinio García
DF		(Argentina) José M. Pérez
MF		(Argentina) Juán Gimenez
MF		(Argentina) Alberto Rastelli
MF		(Argentina) Jorge Gutiérrez
FW		(Argentina) Mario Boyé
FW		(Argentina) Norberto Cupo
FW		(Argentina) Manuel Blanco
FW		(Argentina) Llamil Simes
FW	**11**	(Argentina) Ezra Sued
Manager:
(Argentina) Guillermo Stábile

GK	(Argentina) Manuel Graneros
DF	(Argentina) Osvaldo Ferretti
DF	(Argentina) Luis Angel Bagnato
MF	(Argentina) Domingo Capparelli
MF	(Argentina) Héctor D'Angelo
FW	(Argentina) Miguel Ángel Converti
FW	(Argentina) José M. Sánchez Lage
FW	(Argentina) Gustavo Albella
FW	(Argentina) Nicolás Moreno
FW	(Argentina) Juan C. Huarte
Managers:
(Argentina) José I. Martínez & Félix Zurdo

=== Second leg ===
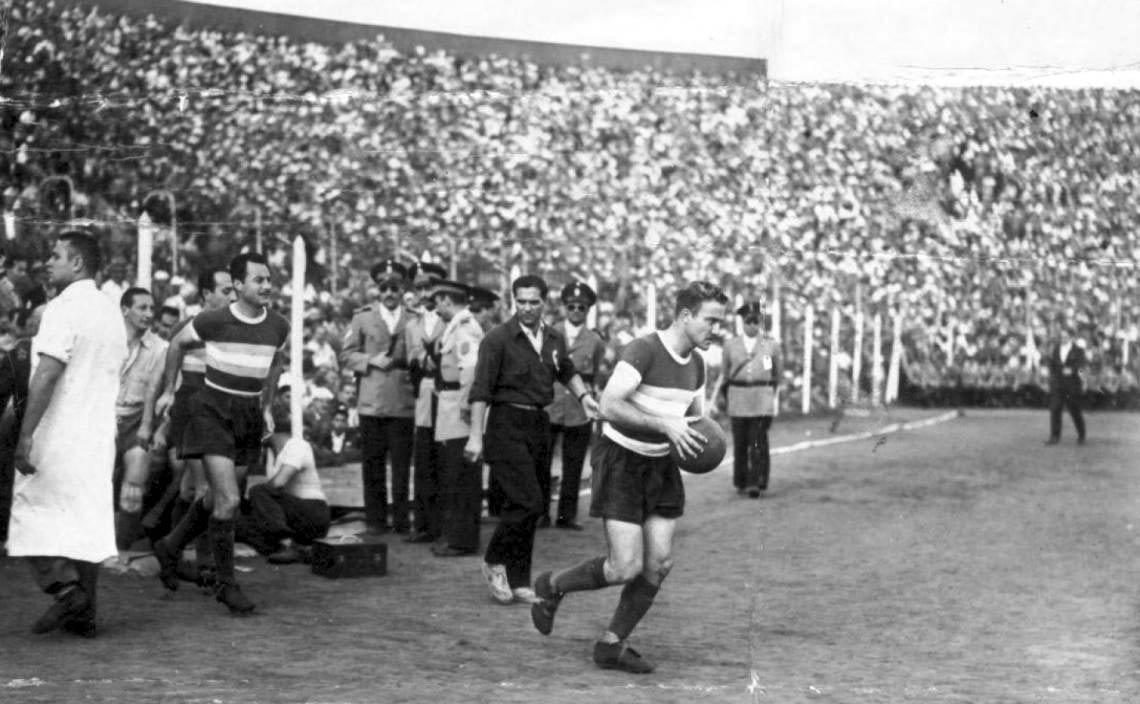
Racing entering the pitch

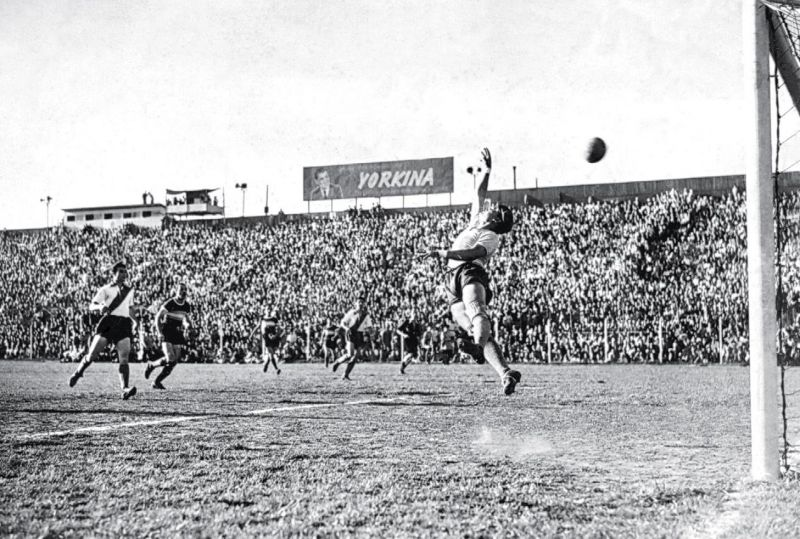
The Boyé's goal for victory

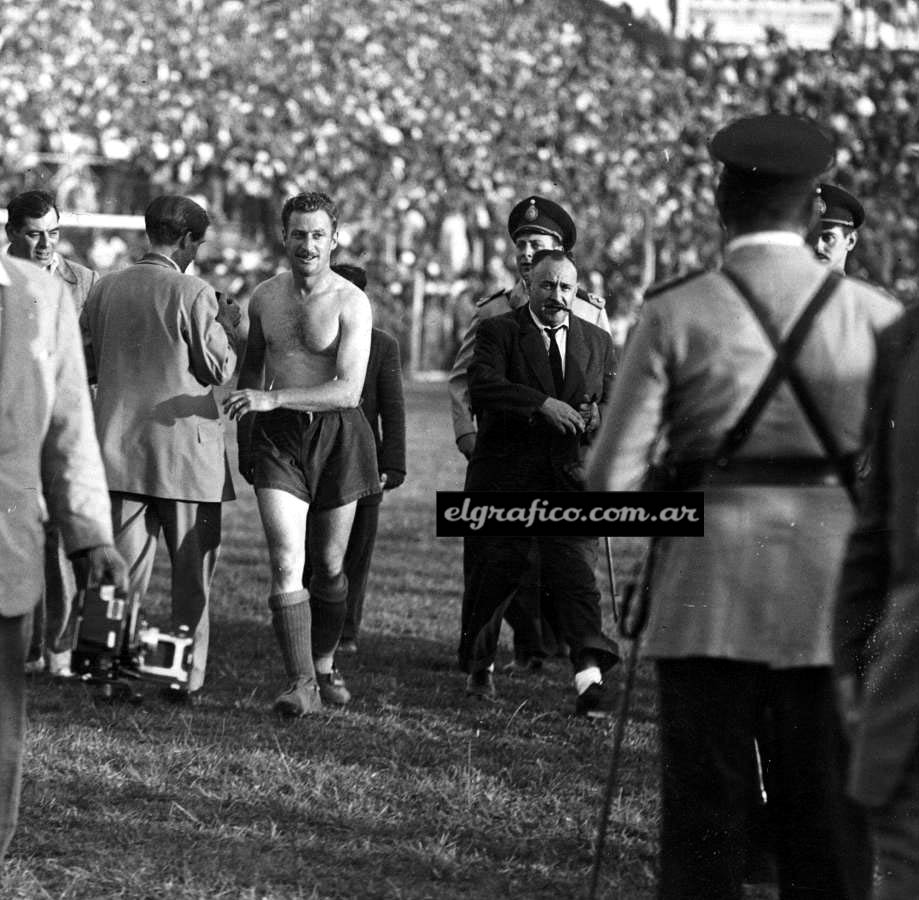
Boyé celebrating

5 Dec 1951
Second leg

Banfield	0–1	Racing
	Report	Boyé 46'

San Lorenzo Stadium, Buenos Aires
Attendance: 47,000
Referee: Bentley Cross (England)

**Banfield**
**Racing**

GK	(Argentina) Manuel Graneros
DF	(Argentina) Osvaldo Ferretti
DF	(Argentina) Luis Angel Bagnato
MF	(Argentina) Domingo Capparelli
MF	(Argentina) Eliseo Mouriño
MF	(Argentina) Héctor D'Angelo
FW	(Argentina) Miguel Ángel Converti
FW	(Argentina) José M. Sánchez Lage
FW	(Argentina) Gustavo Albella
FW	(Argentina) Nicolás Moreno
FW	(Argentina) Raúl Tolosa
Managers:
(Argentina) José I. Martínez & Félix Zurdo

GK	(Argentina) Héctor Grisetti
DF	(Argentina) Higinio García
DF	(Argentina) José M. Pérez
MF	(Argentina) Juán Gimenez
MF	(Argentina) Alberto Rastelli
MF	(Argentina) Jorge Gutiérrez
FW	(Argentina) Mario Boyé
FW	(Argentina) Manuel Ameal
FW	(Argentina) Rubén Bravo
FW	(Argentina) Llamil Simes
FW	(Argentina) Ezra Sued
Manager:
(Argentina) Guillermo Stábile
