= 1946 Copa de Competencia Británica Final =

- Team of Boca Juniors, champions
- Event: Copa de Competencia Británica
Boca Juniors	San Lorenzo
3	1
- Date: December 14, 1946; 79 years ago
- Venue: Estadio Monumental, Buenos Aires
- Referee: (Argentina) Ginzo

The 1946 Copa de Competencia Británica Final was the match that decided the winner of the 3rd edition of this Argentine domestic cup. The game was played on December 14, 1946. Boca Juniors defeated San Lorenzo de Almagro 3–1 at Estadio Monumental, a neutral venue for the match.

== Qualified teams ==
Team	Previous finals app.
Boca Juniors	1944, 1945
San Lorenzo	(none)

== Overview ==
The cup was contested by clubs participating in the 1946 Argentine Primera División season, playing a round of 16 in neutral venues. Boca Juniors beat Vélez at Independiente Stadium, qualifying to the quarterfinals. After eliminating Rosario Central (4–1 at San Lorenzo Stadium) and River Plate (2–0 also in the Gasómetro), Boca reached the final of the competition, held at River Plate Stadium.

On the other hand, San Lorenzo eliminated Ferro Carril Oeste 5–1 at Vélez Sarsfield Stadium, then defeated arch-rival Huracán 2–0 at Ferro Carril Oeste, and Estudiantes de La Plata 1–0 in extra time at La Bombonera.

With goals by Gregorio Pin (2) and José Antonio Vázquez, Boca defeating San Lorenzo in final, finally taking the title after losing in the finals two years consecutively to Huracán and Racing, respectively. Boca Juniors also managed to win the tournament without losing a game.

== Road to the final ==
- all matches played in neutral venues

Boca Juniors		Round	San Lorenzo	
Opponent	Result	Group stage	Opponent	Result
Vélez Sarsfield	3–2	First round	Ferro Carril Oeste	5–1
Rosario Central	4–1	Quarterfinal	Huracán	2–0
River Plate	2–0	Semifinal	Estudiantes (LP)	1–0 (a.e.t.)

== Match details ==
Some moments of the match held in Estadio Monumental
1946 Copa de Competencia Británica Final
14 December 1946

Boca Juniors	3–1	San Lorenzo
Pin 3', 89'; Vázquez 38'	Report	Aballay 85'

Estadio River Plate, Buenos Aires
Referee: Ginzo

Boca Juniors	San Lorenzo

GK	(Argentina) Claudio Vacca
DF	(Argentina) José M. Marante
DF	(Argentina) Rodolfo Dezorzi
MF	(Argentina) Carlos A. Sosa
MF	(Argentina) Ernesto Lazzatti
MF	(Argentina) Natalio Pescia
FW	(Argentina) Mario Boyé
FW	(Argentina) Pío Corcuera
FW	(Argentina) Jaime Sarlanga
FW	(Argentina) José A. Vázquez
FW	(Argentina) Gregorio Pin
Manager:
(Argentina) Mario Fortunato

GK	(Socialist Federal Republic of Yugoslavia) Mierko Blazina
DF	(Argentina) José A. Vanzini
DF	(Argentina) Oscar A. Basso
MF	(Spain) Ángel Zubieta
MF	(Argentina) Salvador Grecco
MF	(Argentina) Bartolomé Colombo
FW	(Argentina) Antonio Imbelloni
FW	(Argentina) Armando Farro
FW	(Argentina) Roberto Aballay
FW	(Argentina) Rinaldo Martino
FW	(Argentina) Oscar H. Silva
Manager:
(Argentina) Diego García and Pedro Omar
