= 1945 Copa de Competencia Británica Final =

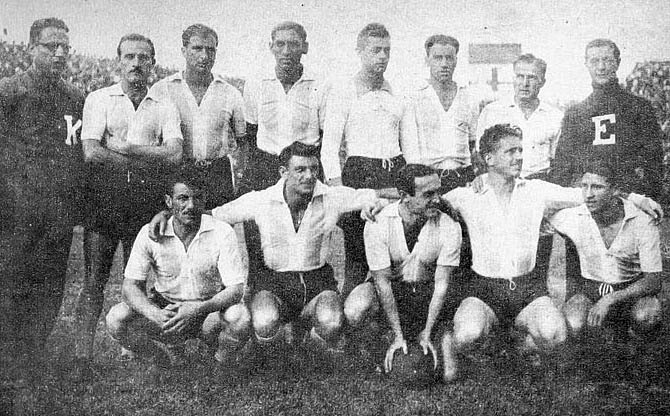
- A Racing Club team of 1945
- Event: 1945 Copa de Competencia Británica
Racing	Boca Juniors
4	1
- Date: October 12, 1945
- Venue: Estadio de San Lorenzo, Buenos Aires
- Referee: Humberto Dottori

The 1945 Copa de Competencia Británica Final was the match that decided the winner of the 2nd edition of this Argentine domestic cup. The game was played on October 12, 1945. Racing defeated Boca Juniors 4–1 at San Lorenzo Stadium, winning their first Copa Británica trophy.

== Qualified teams ==
Team	Previous finals app.
Racing	(none)
Boca Juniors	1944

== Overview ==
The cup was contested by the 16 clubs participating in 1945 Argentine Primera División, playing a single-elimination format in neutral venues. Racing beat Huracán (5–3 at San Lorenzo), River Plate (3–2 at La Bombonera), and Estudiantes de La Plata (4–0 at San Lorenzo) to advance to the final.

Boca Juniors beat Atlanta 6–2 at Ferro C. Oeste, qualifying to the quarter finals. After beating Independiente (1–0 at San Lorenzo) and thrashing Ferro Carril Oeste (7–0 at Estadio Racing Club), Boca earned a place in the final.

In the final, Racing went on to score 2 times in the first half, then 2 more times in the second half to beat Boca Juniors 4–1, with the only Boca Juniors goal coming from Mariano Sánchez in the 30th minute. Some Boca Juniors supporters went on to complain that referee Dottori did not award a penalty shot to Boca Juniors.

== Road to the final ==
- all matches played in neutral venues

Racing		Round	Boca Juniors	
Opponent	Result	Group stage	Opponent	Result
Huracán	5–3	First round	Atlanta	6–2
River Plate	3–2	Quarterfinal	Independiente	1–0
Estudiantes (LP)	4–0	Semifinal	Ferro Carril Oeste	7–0

== Match details ==
Some moments of the match held in Estadio Gasómetro of San Lorenzo
1945 Copa de Competencia Británica Final
October 12, 1945
Final

Racing	4–1	Boca Juniors
D'Alessandro 19'; Camer 24'; Monestés 53'; Fiore 77'	Report	Sánchez 30'

Estadio de San Lorenzo, Buenos Aires
Referee: Humberto Dottori

Racing	Boca Juniors

GK	(Argentina) Manuel Graneros
DF	(Argentina) José Salomón
DF	(Argentina) Juan M. Filgueiras
MF	(Argentina) José García
MF	(Argentina) León Strembel
MF	(Argentina) Manuel Quiroga
FW	(Argentina) Juan C. Camer
FW	(Argentina) Humberto Fiore
FW	(Argentina) Roberto D'Alessandro
FW	(Argentina) Oscar Monestes
FW	(Argentina) Ezra Sued
Manager:
(Italy) (Argentina) Renato Cesarini

GK	(Argentina) Claudio Vacca
DF	(Argentina) Roberto Romani
DF	(Argentina) Rodolfo Dezorzi
MF	(Argentina) Carlos A. Sosa
MF	(Argentina) Ernesto Lazzatti
MF	(Argentina) Natalio Pescia
FW	(Argentina) Juan Carlos Lorenzo
FW	(Argentina) Pío Corcuera
FW	(Argentina) Jaime Sarlanga
FW	(Uruguay) Severino Varela
FW	(Argentina) Mariano Sánchez
Manager:
(Argentina) Alfredo Garasini
