= 1945 Copa Escobar-Gerona =

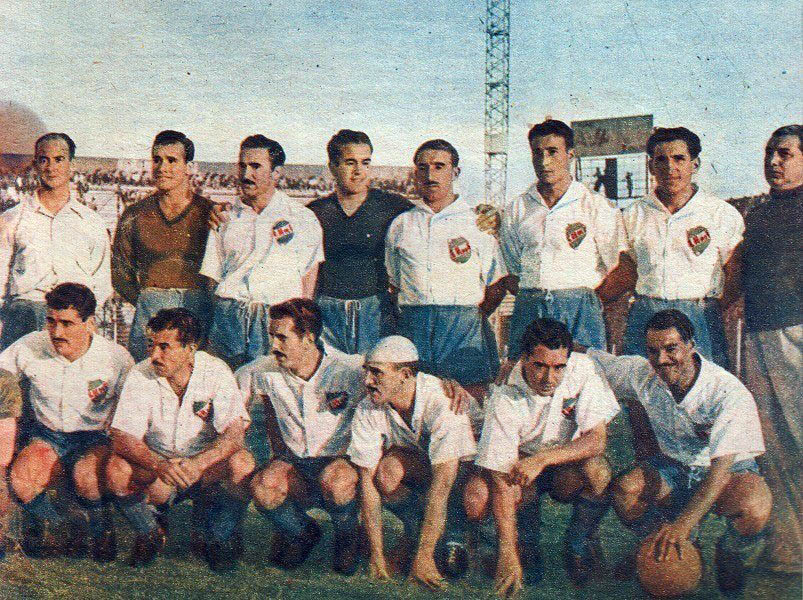
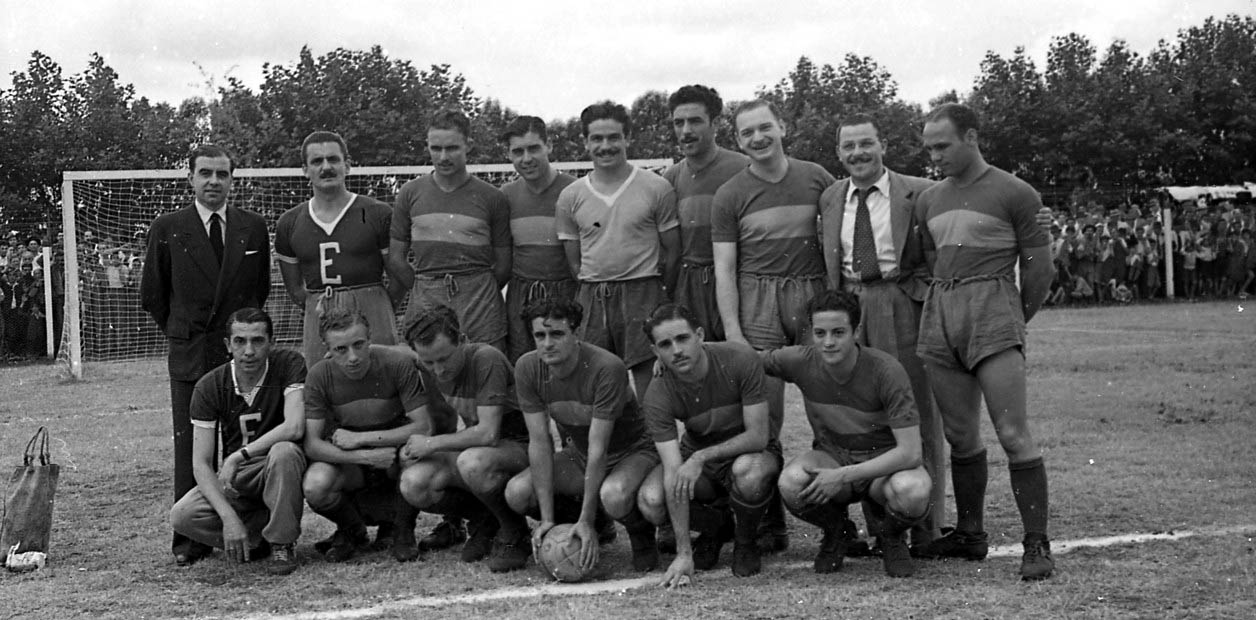
- Teams of Nacional and Boca Juniors of 1945; Both clubs were crowned champions
- Event: Copa Escobar-Gerona
Boca Juniors	Nacional
(Argentina)	(Uruguay)
2	2
- Tied on points 2–2, title awarded to both teams

First leg
Boca Juniors	Nacional
1	2
- Date: 5 December 1945
- Venue: San Lorenzo, Buenos Aires
- Referee: Eduardo Forte (Argentina)

Second leg
Nacional	Boca Juniors
2	3
- Date: 22 December 1945
- Venue: Estadio Centenario, Montevideo
- Man of the Match: Jaime Sarlanga
- Referee: Nobel Valentini (Uruguay)

The 1945 Copa Escobar-Gerona, also named Copa de Confraternidad Rioplatense, was the third edition of the competition organised jointly by the Argentine and Uruguayan associations. The 1945 edition marked the first time that the title was actually awarded.

Boca Juniors (Argentine Primera División runner-up) faced Club Nacional de Football (Uruguayan Primera División runner-up) in a two-legged series at San Lorenzo Stadium in Buenos Aires, Argentina and Estadio Centenario in Montevideo, Uruguay. In the first match, Nacional won 2–1, while Boca Juniors won the second match, winning 3–2. After both teams tied on points and no third match was scheduled to define the series, both teams were declared champions and the title was shared.

== Qualified teams ==
Team	Qualification	Previous app.
(Argentina) Boca Juniors	1945 Primera División runner-up	(none)
(Uruguay) Nacional	1945 Primera División runner-up	(none)

Note

- **Bold** indicates winning years

== Venues ==
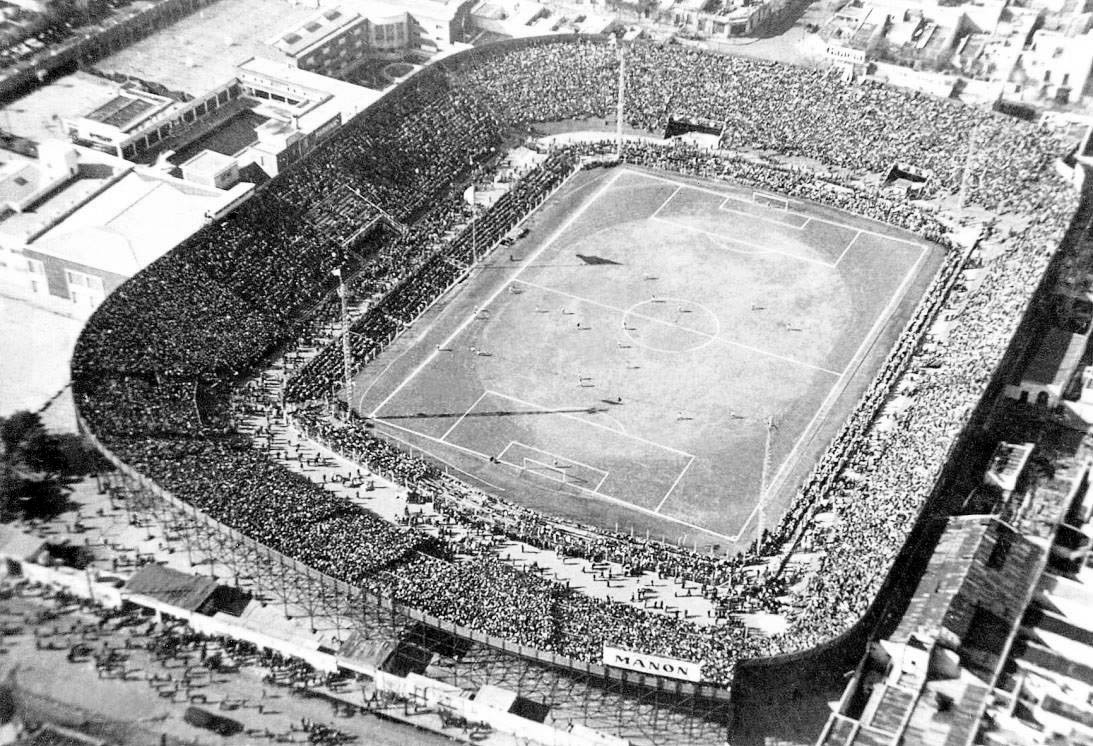
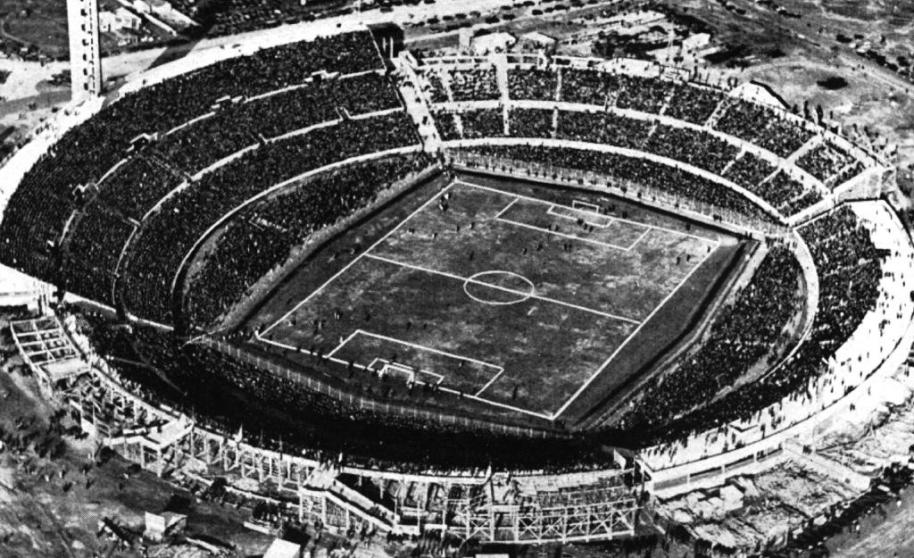
San Lorenzo Stadium (left) and Estadio Centenario, venues for the matches

== Match details ==
=== First leg ===
1945 Copa Escobar-Gerona
5 December 1945
First leg

Boca Juniors (Argentina)	1–2	(Uruguay) Nacional
Corcuera 18'	Report	Medina 16'; A. García 60'

San Lorenzo Stadium, Buenos Aires
Referee: Eduardo Forte (Argentina)

**Boca Juniors**	**Nacional**

GK	(Argentina) Obdulio Diano
DF	(Argentina) Víctor Valussi
DF	(Argentina) Rodolfo Dezorzi	(substituted off) 70'
MF	(Argentina) Carlos Sosa
MF	(Argentina) Ernesto Lazzatti
MF	(Argentina) Natalio Pescia
FW	(Argentina) Mario Boyé
FW	(Argentina) Pío Corcuera	(substituted off) 45'
FW	(Argentina) Jaime Sarlanga
FW	(Argentina) Enrique Martegani
FW	(Argentina) Mariano Sánchez
Substitutes:
DF	(Argentina) Luis Laidlaw	(substituted on) 70'
FW	(Argentina) Lucero Fedencrini	(substituted on) 45'
Manager:
(Argentina) Alfredo Garasini

GK	(Uruguay) Aníbal Paz
DF	(Uruguay) Raúl Pini
DF	(Uruguay) Eusebio Tejera
MF	(Uruguay) General Viana
MF	(Uruguay) Eugenio Galvalisi
MF	(Uruguay) Dándolo Rodríguez
FW	(Uruguay) Luis Ernesto Castro	(substituted off) 70'
FW	(Uruguay) José M. Medina	(substituted off) 65'
FW	(Argentina) (Uruguay) Atilio García
FW	(Uruguay) Roberto Porta
FW	(Uruguay) Bibiano Zapirain
Substitutes:
FW	(Uruguay) Juan A. Bugallo	(substituted on) 70'
FW	(Uruguay) Aníbal Ciocca	(substituted on) 65'
Manager:
(Uruguay) Héctor Castro

=== Second leg ===
22 December 1945
Second leg

Nacional (Uruguay)	2–3	(Argentina) Boca Juniors
Volpi 35'; Medina 55'	Report	Sarlanga 2', 12', 60'

Estadio Centenario, Montevideo
Referee: Nobel Valentini (Uruguay)

**Nacional**	**Boca Juniors**

GK	(Uruguay) Aníbal Paz
DF	(Uruguay) Raúl Pini
DF	(Uruguay) Eusebio Tejera
MF	(Uruguay) General Viana
MF	(Uruguay) Eugenio Galvalisi
MF	(Uruguay) Dándolo Rodríguez
FW	(Uruguay) Juan A. Bugallo
FW	(Uruguay) José M. Medina
FW	(Argentina) (Uruguay) Atilio García
FW	(Uruguay) Roberto Porta
FW	(Uruguay) Luis Volpi
Manager:
(Uruguay) Héctor Castro

GK	(Argentina) Obdulio Diano
DF	(Argentina) José Marante
DF	(Argentina) Rodolfo Dezorzi	(substituted off) 55'
MF	(Argentina) Alberto Pascal
MF	(Argentina) Ernesto Lazzatti
MF	(Argentina) Natalio Pescia
FW	(Argentina) Mario Boyé
FW	(Argentina) Pío Corcuera	(substituted off) 80'
FW	(Argentina) Jaime Sarlanga
FW	(Argentina) Severino Varela
FW	(Argentina) Juan C. Rodríguez	(substituted off) 80'
Substitutes:
DF	(Argentina) Víctor Valussi	(substituted on) 55'
FW	(Argentina) Juan Carlos Lorenzo	(substituted on) 80'
FW	(Argentina) Lucero Fedencrini	(substituted on) 80'
Manager:
(Argentina) Alfredo Garasini
