= Mario Boyé =

Argentine footballer (1922–1992)

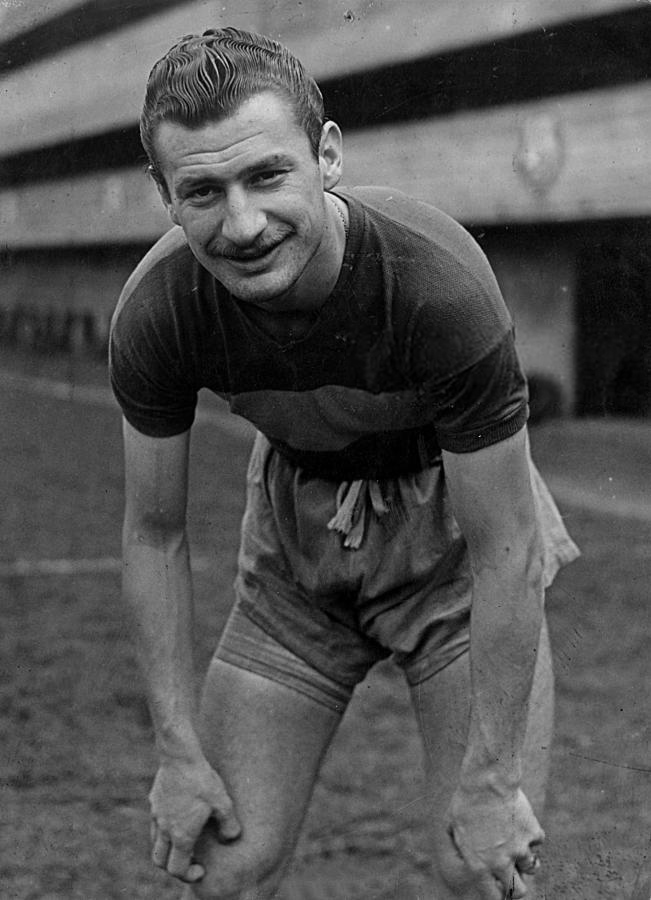
- Boyé while playing for Boca Juniors in the 1940s

Personal information
- Full name: Mario Emilio Heriberto Boyé Auterio
- Date of birth: July 30, 1922
- Place of birth: Buenos Aires, Argentina
- Date of death: July 21, 1992 (aged 69)
- Positions: Winger; striker

Youth career
- 1936–1941: Boca Juniors

Senior career*
| Years | Team | Apps | (Gls) |
| 1941–1949 | Boca Juniors | 190 | (108) |
| 1949 | Genoa | 18 | (12) |
| 1950 | Millonarios | | |
| 1950–1953 | Racing Club | 84 | (33) |
| 1954 | Huracán | 20 | (7) |
| 1955 | Boca Juniors | 18 | (5) |

International career
| 1945–1951 | Argentina | 17 | (7) |
- * Club domestic league appearances and goals as of August 2007

Mario Emilio Heriberto Boyé Auterio (30 July 1922 – 21 July 1992) was an Argentine footballer. A powerful winger or striker, he played for Boca Juniors, Racing Club de Avellaneda and Huracán in Argentina, Genoa in Italy and Millonarios in Colombia.

Nicknamed El Atómico (The Atomic One), he started playing in the youth division of Boca Juniors to debut in first division on 8 June 1941 in the victory against Independiente, and scoring his first goal a week later against Huracán. With Boca he won the 1943 and 1944 Argentine leagues, and was the league's top-scorer in 1946 with 24 goals. He moved to Italy where he became "Il Matadore" (The Killer), but returned to Argentina four seasons later. After winning the 1951 league with Racing and playing one season for Huracán, he returned to Boca to retire a year later. He played 228 matches for Boca in all competitions, scoring 124 goals.
He was the top scorer in the Copa del Atlántico 1947 with 5 goals, a non-CONMEBOL tournament which is considered one of the precursors of the Copa Libertadores.

== National team ==
Boyé played for the Argentina national team between 1945 and 1951. He was on the Argentine teams that won the Copa América three times, in 1945, 1946 and 1947.

== After retirement ==
Boyé had a brief spell in charge of Boca Juniors in 1961. In 1963 former Boca Juniors player Mario Boyé and former San Lorenzo de Almagro player René Pontoni, brothers-in-law who had both been members of Argentine national teams, set up a pizzeria in Belgrano, Buenos Aires, La Guitarrita, which expanded into a chain, still run by Pontoni's grandson as of 2024.

== Honours ==
Boca Juniors

- Argentine Primera División: 1943, 1944
- Copa Ibarguren: 1944
- Copa de Competencia: 1946
- Copa de Confraternidad: 1945, 1946

Racing

- Argentine Primera División: 1950, 1951

Argentina

- Copa América: 1945, 1946, 1947
