= 1946 Copa Escobar-Gerona =

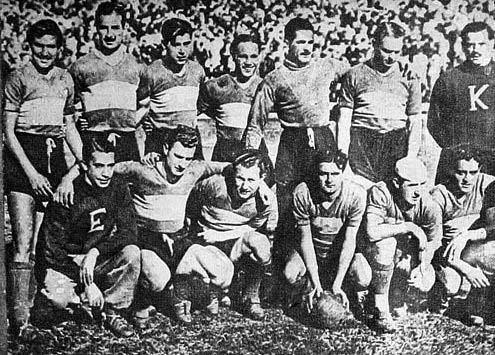
- A Boca Juniors team of 1946
Peñarol	Boca Juniors
(Uruguay)	(Argentina)
0	4
- (On points, goals scored did not count)

First leg
Peñarol	Boca Juniors
2	3
- Date: 22 December 1946
- Venue: Estadio Centenario, Montevideo
- Referee: Bianchi

Second leg
Boca Juniors	Peñarol
6	3
- Date: 28 December 1946
- Venue: San Lorenzo, Buenos Aires
- Referee: Valentini

The 1946 Copa Escobar-Gerona, also named Copa de Confraternidad Rioplatense, was the 4th (and last) edition of this cup competition organised jointly by the Argentine and Uruguayan football associations. The 1946 edition of the cup was the only edition out of the four editions in which the title was awarded to one club, rather than the two of the previous year or the none of 1941 and 1942.

== Overview ==
Boca Juniors (Primera División Argentina runner-up) faced Peñarol (Uruguayan Primera División runner-up) in a two-legged series at Estadio Centenario in Montevideo, Uruguay and San Lorenzo Stadium in Buenos Aires, Argentina. Boca Juniors won both matches, winning 3–2 in Montevideo and 6–3 in Buenos Aires.

Boca Juniors forward Pío Corcuera was the top scorer of the series, with 4 goals.

== Qualified teams ==
Team	Qualification	Previous app.
(Argentina) Boca Juniors	1946 Primera División runner-up	**1945**
(Uruguay) Peñarol	1946 Primera División runner-up	1941, 1942

Note

- **Bold** indicates winning years

== Venues ==
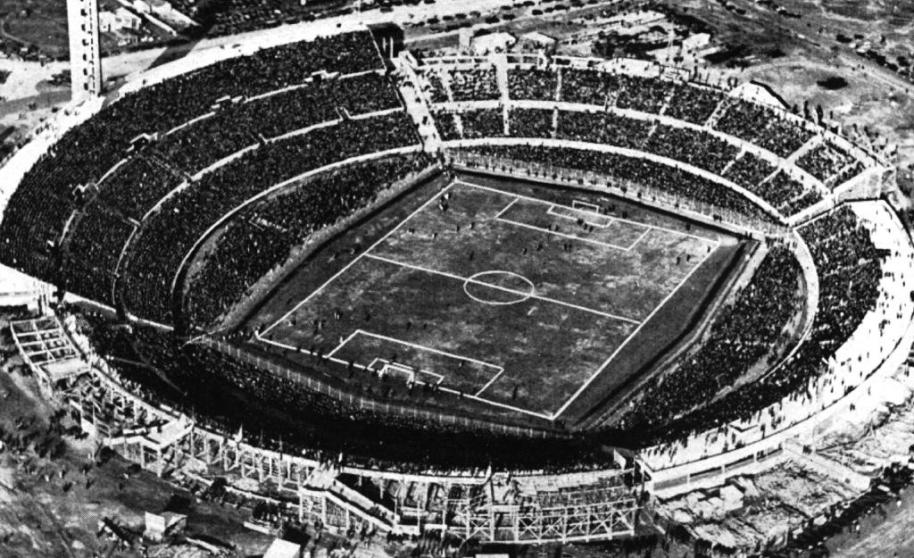
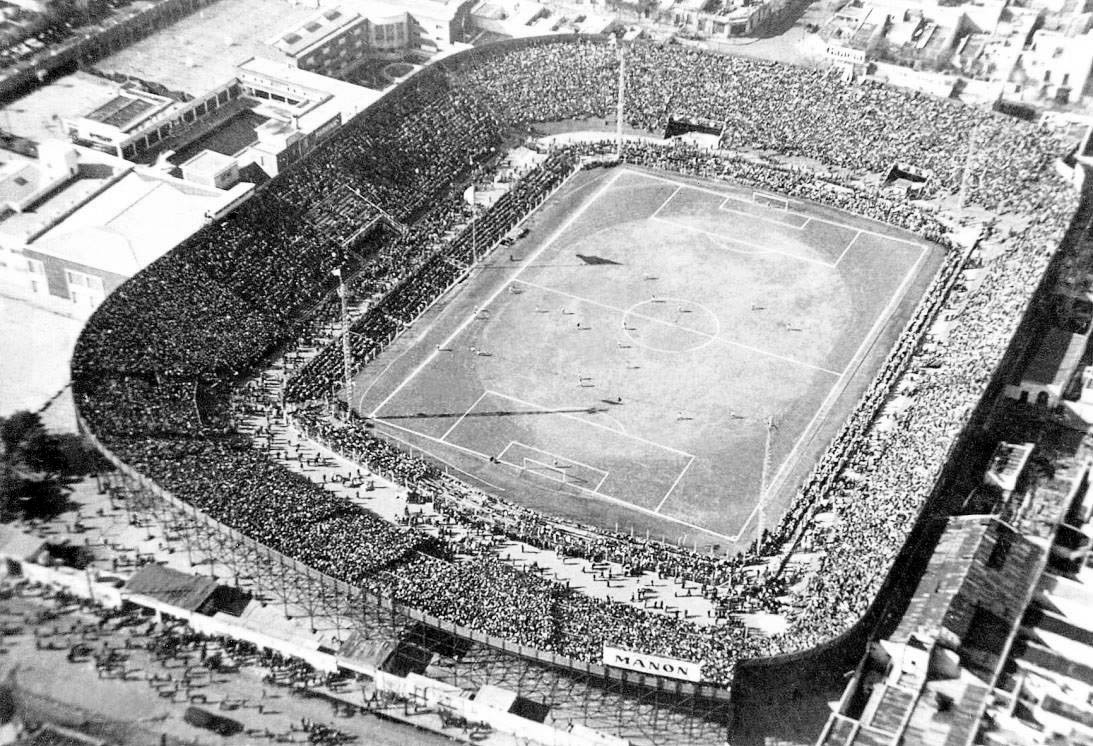
Estadio Centenario (left) and San Lorenzo de Almagro Stadium, venues for the matches

== Match details ==
=== First leg ===
1946 Copa Escobar-Gerona
22 December 1946
First leg

Peñarol (Uruguay)	2–3	(Argentina) Boca Juniors
Vidal 25', 66'	Report	Corcuera 51', 55'; Boyé 88'

Estadio Centenario, Montevideo
Referee: (Uruguay) Galileo Bianchi

**Peñarol**	**Boca Juniors**

GK	(Uruguay) Flavio Pereyra Nattero
DF	(Uruguay) Mario Lorenzo
DF	(Uruguay) Sixto Possamai
MF	(Uruguay) José Pedro Colturi	(substituted off) 70'
MF	(Uruguay) Obdulio Varela
MF	(Uruguay) Luis Prais
FW	(Uruguay) Julio César Britos
FW	(Uruguay) Raúl Antonio Schiaffino	(substituted off) 65'
FW	(Uruguay) Óscar Chirimini
FW	(Uruguay) Juan Alberto Schiaffino
FW	(Uruguay) Ernesto Vidal
Substitutes:
DF	(Uruguay) Juan Carlos González	(substituted on) 70'
	(Uruguay) Rodolfo Piñeyro	(substituted on) 65'
Manager:
(Uruguay) Aníbal Tejada

GK	(Argentina) Claudio Vacca
DF	(Argentina) José Marante
DF	(Argentina) Rodolfo Dezorzi
MF	(Argentina) Carlos Sosa
MF	(Argentina) Ernesto Lazzatti
MF	(Argentina) Natalio Pescia
FW	(Argentina) Mario Boyé
FW	(Argentina) Pío Corcuera
FW	(Argentina) Jaime Sarlanga
FW	(Uruguay) José Antonio Vázquez	(substituted off) 45'
FW	(Argentina) Gregorio Pin
Substitutes:
FW	(Argentina) Juan Carlos Lorenzo	(substituted on) 45'
Manager:
(Argentina) Mario Fortunato

=== Second leg ===
28 December 1946
Second leg

Boca Juniors (Argentina)	6–3	(Uruguay) Peñarol
Boyé 15'; Corcuera 18', 45'; Pin 52', 71'; Lorenzo 55'	Report	Vidal 48', 82'; J. Schiaffino 73'

San Lorenzo Stadium, Buenos Aires
Referee: J. Álvarez

**Boca Juniors**	**Peñarol**

GK	(Argentina) Claudio Vacca	(substituted off) 69'
DF	(Argentina) José Marante
DF	(Argentina) Rodolfo Dezorzi
MF	(Argentina) Carlos Sosa
MF	(Argentina) Ernesto Lazzatti
MF	(Argentina) Natalio Pescia
FW	(Argentina) Mario Boyé
FW	(Argentina) Pío Corcuera	(substituted off) 45'
FW	(Argentina) Jaime Sarlanga
FW	(Uruguay) José Antonio Vázquez
FW	(Argentina) Gregorio Pin
Substitutes:
FW	(Argentina) Juan Carlos Lorenzo	(substituted on) 45'
GK	(Argentina) Nobel Biglieri	(substituted on) 69'
Manager:
(Argentina) Mario Fortunato

GK	(Uruguay) Flavio Pereyra Nattero
DF	(Uruguay) Mario Lorenzo
DF	(Uruguay) Sixto Possamai
MF	(Uruguay) Juan Carlos González
MF	(Uruguay) Obdulio Varela
MF	(Uruguay) Luis Prais	(substituted off) 38'
FW	(Uruguay) Julio César Britos	(substituted off) 45'
FW	(Uruguay) Raúl Antonio Schiaffino
FW	(Uruguay) Óscar Chirimini	(substituted off) 65'
FW	(Uruguay) Juan Alberto Schiaffino
FW	(Uruguay) Ernesto Vidal
Substitutes:
FW	(Uruguay) José Etchegoyen	(substituted on) 38'
FW	(Uruguay) Domingo Gelpi	(substituted on) 45'
	(Uruguay) Rodolfo Piñeyro	(substituted on) 65'
Manager:
(Uruguay) Aníbal Tejada
