= José Salomón =

Argentine footballer

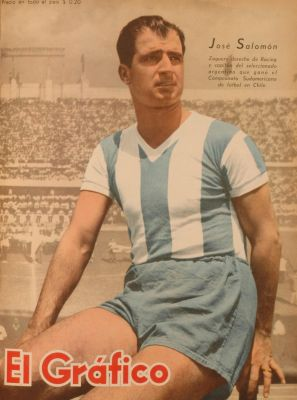

Personal information
- Full name: José Salomón
- Date of birth: 9 July 1916
- Place of birth: La Plata, Argentina
- Date of death: 20 January 1990 (aged 73)
- Position: Defender

Senior career*
Years	Team	Apps	(Gls)
1934	Talleres-Lanus	3	(0)
1934–1938	Talleres (RE)	93	(0)
1939–1946	Racing Club	215	(0)
1947	Liverpool de Montevideo		(0)
1950	Talleres (RE)	9	(0)

International career
1939–1946	Argentina	44	(0)
- * Club domestic league appearances and goals

José Salomón (9 July 1916 in La Plata – 22 January 1990) was an Argentine football defender who played club football for Talleres de Remedios de Escalada and Racing Club de Avellaneda and captained the Argentina national football team.

Salomón started his career in 1934 with Talleres before moving to Avellaneda to play for Racing Club between 1939 and 1945.

Salomón played a total of 44 games for Argentina including 21 in the Copa América a national record he shares with Oscar Ruggeri. Salomón was part of two Copa América winning teams but his career was ended in the 1946 edition of the competition by a Jair Rosa Pinto tackle which broke his tibia and fibula sparking a riot and pitch invasion and fueling the Argentina and Brazil football rivalry.

== Honours ==
Racing

- Copa de Competencia: 1945

Argentina

- Copa América: 1941, 1945
- Copa Lipton: 1942, 1945
