= Ezra Sued =

Argentinian footballer

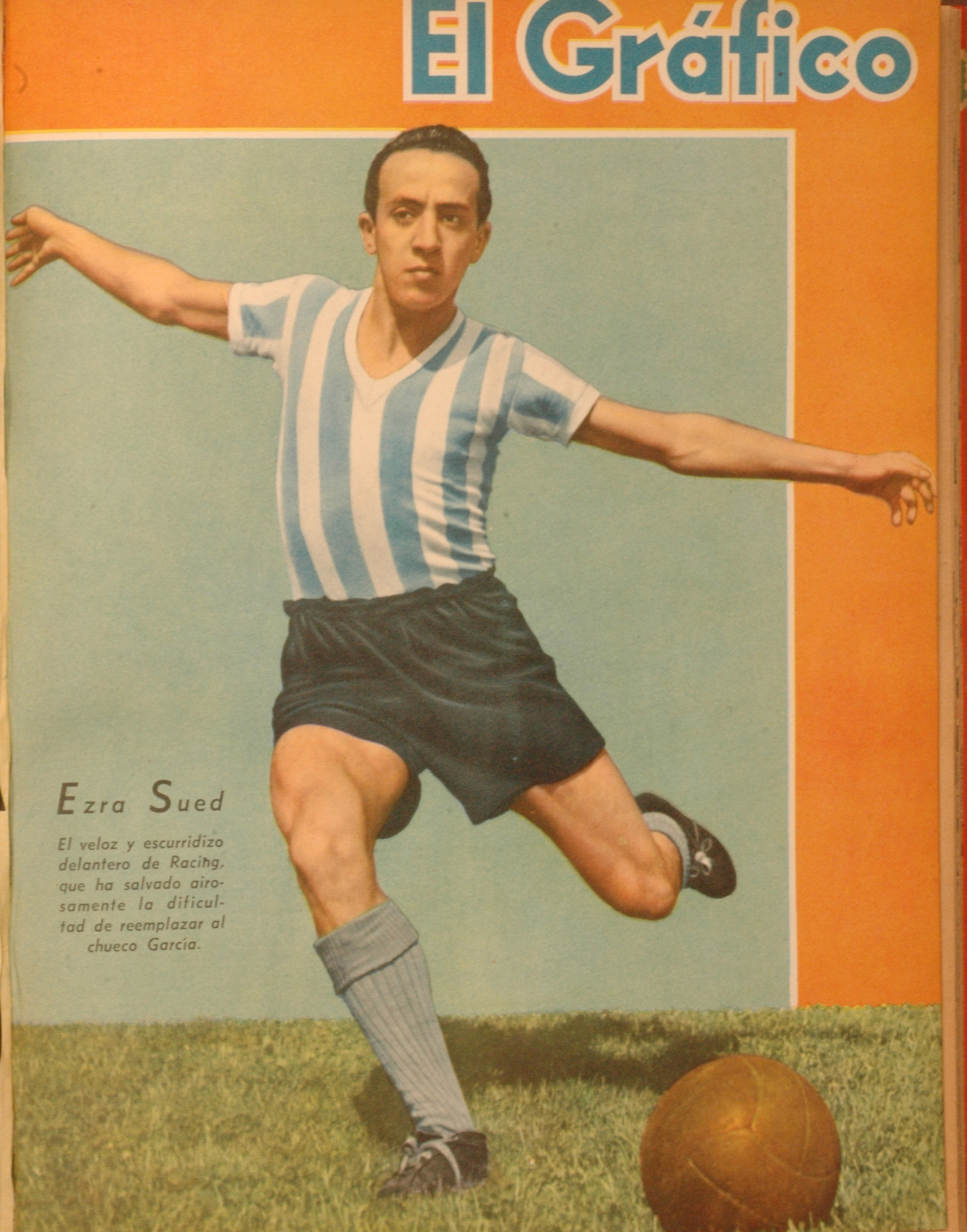
- Sued in the cover of a 1946 edition of El Gráfico

Personal information
- Date of birth: June 7, 1923
- Place of birth: Once, Buenos Aires, Argentina
- Date of death: August 21, 2011 (aged 88)
- Place of death: Argentina
- Position: Forward

Youth career
- 1940–1943: Racing

Senior career*
Years	Team	Apps	(Gls)
1943–1954	Racing	308	(47)
Total		308	(47)

International career
1945–1947	Argentina	6	(2)
- * Club domestic league appearances and goals

Ezra Sued (7 June 1923 – 21 August 2011) was an Argentine international football striker.

== Career ==
Born in Once, Buenos Aires, Sued began playing club football for local side Racing Club de Avellaneda. He spent his entire professional career with the club, playing from 1943 until 1954 and winning the Argentine championship three times. He played in 308 matches and scored 47 goals for the club.

Sued made six appearances and scored two goals for the Argentina national football team, appearing in the 1946 and 1947 South American Championships.

He died on 21 August 2011 from an infection at the age of 88.

== Honours ==
Racing

- Copa de Competencia: 1945
- Argentine Primera División: 1949, 1950, 1951

Argentina

- South American Championship: 1946, 1947
