= Carlos García Cambón =

Argentine footballer and manager (1949–2022)

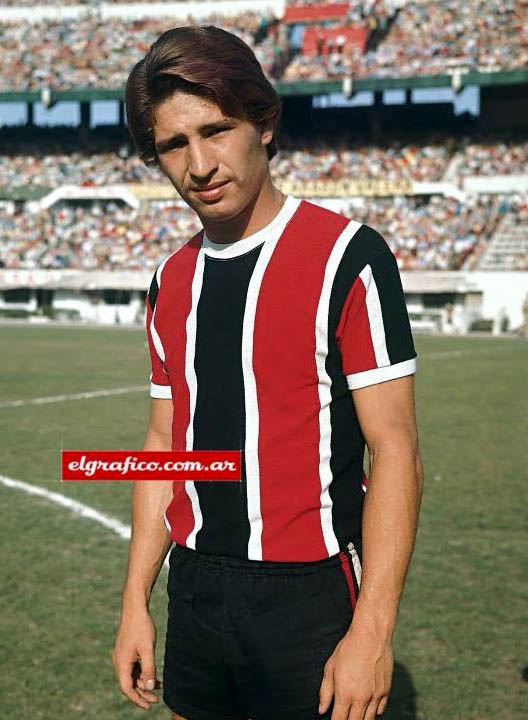
- García Cambón during his tenure on Chacarita Juniors

Personal information
- Full name: Carlos María García Cambón
- Date of birth: 27 March 1949
- Place of birth: Buenos Aires, Argentina
- Date of death: 27 April 2022 (aged 73)
- Position: Striker

Senior career*
| Years | Team | Apps | (Gls) |
| 1969–1973 | Chacarita Juniors | 213 (total) | (53) |
| 1974–1977 | Boca Juniors | 104 | (33) |
| 1977 | Unión de Santa Fe | 12 | (1) |
| 1978 | Chacarita Juniors | (see above) | |
- * Club domestic league appearances and goals

Carlos María García Cambón (27 March 1949 – 27 April 2022) was an Argentine football player and manager. In his debut for Boca Juniors, he scored four goals in the Superclásico derby against River Plate.

== Playing career ==
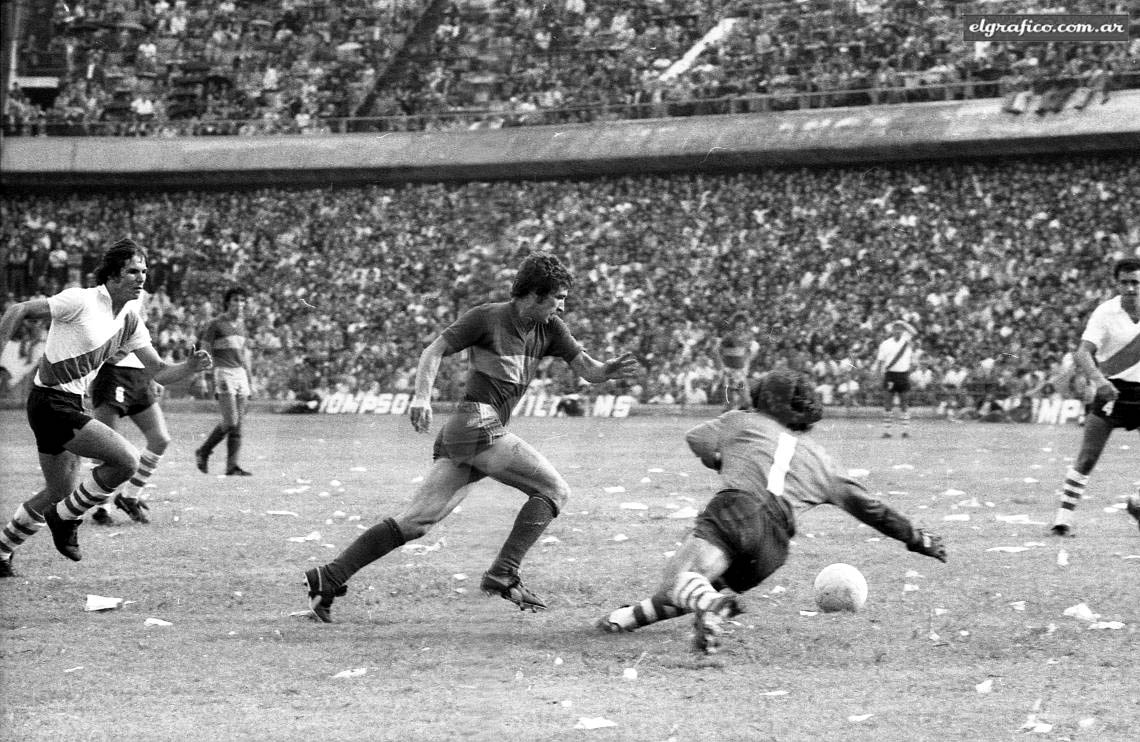
García Cambón scoring the 4th and last goal to River Plate in his debut for Boca Juniors in 1974

García Cambón started his career with Chacarita Juniors and was part of the team that won the Metropolitano 1969 championship. He is fondly remembered by the Chacarita fans because he is their top scorer in games against their local rivals, Atlanta, with eight goals.

In 1974, García Cambón moved to Boca Juniors. His debut game is remembered as one of the most astonishing debut performances in the history of Argentine football. On 3 February 1974, he played his first game for Boca in the Superclásico against fierce rivals River Plate. The game ended 5–2 to Boca with García Cambón scoring four times. He remains the only player to have scored four goals in the Superclásico. During his time at Boca, García Cambón won two league championships, the Metropolitano and Nacional titles.

In early 1977, García Cambón was sold to Unión de Santa Fe.

== Coaching career ==
After retirement, García Cambón moved into coaching; in 1998, he was appointed caretaker coach of Boca Juniors. He went on to manage in Bolivia with Blooming and in Indonesia with Persija Jakarta.

== Death ==
García Cambón died on 27 April 2022 after some complications related to an abdominal aortic aneurysm.

== Honours ==
Chacarita Juniors

- Primera División: 1969 Metropolitano

Boca Juniors

- Primera División: 1976 Metropolitano, 1976 Nacional

Argentina Youth

- U-20 South American Championship: 1967
