= Natalio Pescia =

Argentine footballer

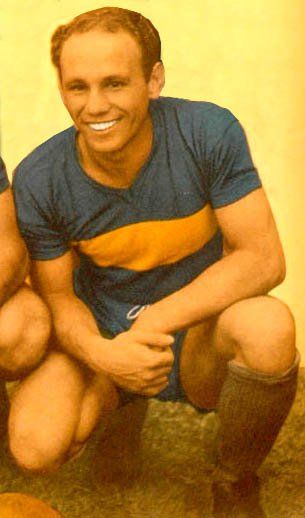
- Pescia in 1944.

Personal information
- Full name: Natalio Agustín Pescia
- Date of birth: January 1, 1922
- Place of birth: Dock Sud, Argentina
- Date of death: November 11, 1989 (aged 67)
- Position: Central midfielder

Senior career*
Years	Team	Apps	(Gls)
1942–1956	Boca Juniors	347	(7)

International career
1946–1954	Argentina	12	(0)
- * Club domestic league appearances and goals as of July 2007

Natalio Agustín Pescia (January 1, 1922 – November 11, 1989) was an Argentine football midfielder, born in Dock Sud district of Avellaneda Partido. He played his entire club career for Boca Juniors in Argentina.

Pescia played a total of 364 games for Boca in all competitions scoring 7 goals for the club. He also won 7 championships with the club, 3 domestic leagues, 2 national cups and 2 international cups.

He was part of a historic midfield line, along with Carlos Sosa and Ernesto Lazzatti.

== Biography ==
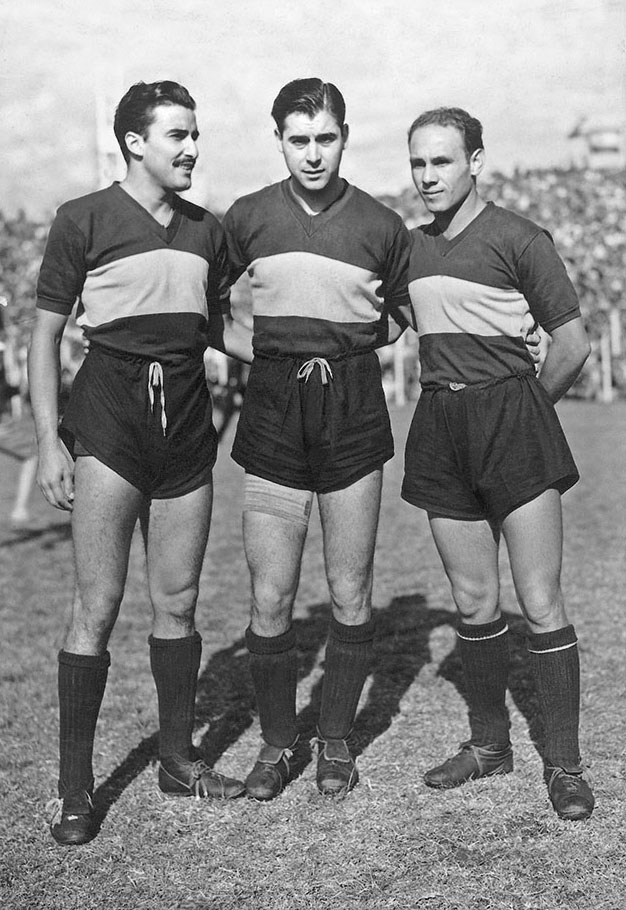
Carlos Sosa, Ernesto Lazzatti and Pescia, the midfield line of Boca Juniors in the 1940s.

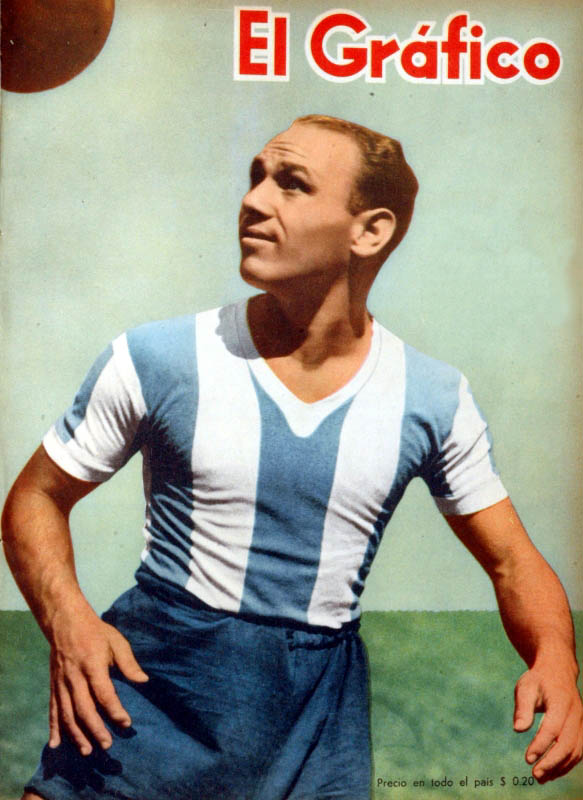
Pescia with the Argentina national team in 1946.

Pescia was selected by Boca Juniors at 12 years old, starting at the 7th. division. He debuted in the senior squad on August 30, 1942, when Boca was beat by Chacarita Juniors by 2–1. The next season, Pescia was part of one of the most remembered midfield lines in the history of the club, along with Carlos Sosa and Ernesto Lazzatti between 1943 and 1947 when Boca Juniors won the 1943 and 1944 domestic leagues, apart from one Copa Ibarguren, one Copa de Competencia Británica and two Copa Escobar-Gerona.

In 1954 Boca Juniors won a local tournament after 10 years without titles, with Pescia as captain and former teammate Ernesto Lazzatti as coach. Sosa played a total of 15 seasons for Boca Juniors, being its last official match the 4–1 victory over Huracán, on December 2, 1956.

Despite its professional retirement, Pescia played some friendly matches with the team. In 1957 he and other players representing Boca Juniors played a match v. Paraguayan team Olimpia in Asunción.

Pescia played 12 games for the Argentina national team, being called up for the first time in 1945 to play the Copa América, although he did not play any match. The next year Pescia was called up again for the 1946 tournament, debuting v. Bolivia in a smashing victory by 7–1.

In the 1947 edition Pescia played 6 games for the national side and Argentina won its third consecutive title. Pescia's last games with Argentina was in 1954 when the squad defeated Portugal by 3–1.

After retiring from football, Pescia was candidate to president of Boca Juniors, being defeated by Alberto J. Armando.

Pescia died in Avellaneda at 67 years old, on November 11, 1989. The club honored him naming "Tribuna Natalio Pescia" to one of La Bombonera grandstands.

== Titles ==
Boca Juniors

- Primera División (3): 1943, 1944, 1954
- Copa Ibarguren (1): 1944
- Copa de Competencia Británica (1): 1946
- Copa Escobar-Gerona (2): 1945, 1946

Argentina

- Copa América: 1945, 1946, 1947
