= Mario Fortunato =

Argentine footballer and manager

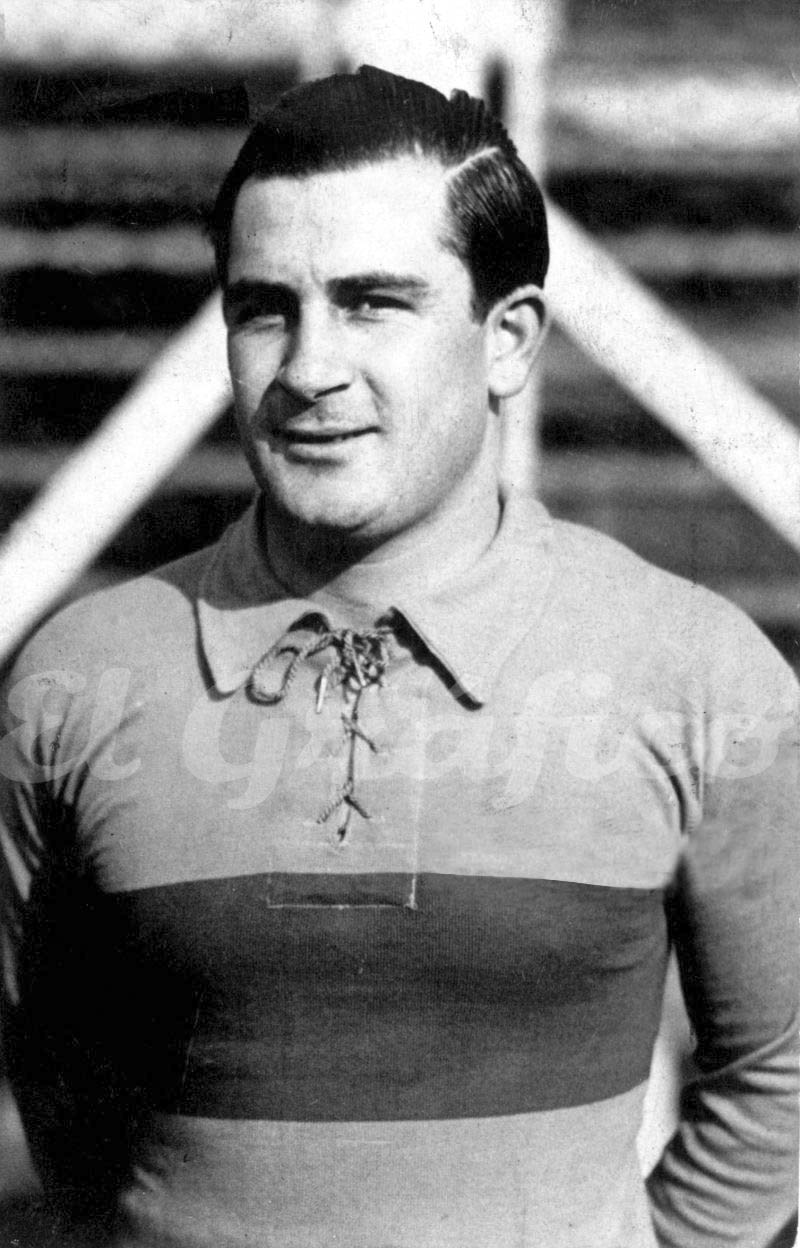
- Fortunato with Boca Juniors

Personal information
- Full name: Mario Francisco Fortunato
- Date of birth: 1905
- Place of birth: Argentina
- Date of death: 10 November 1970 (Aged 65)
- Position: Midfielder

Senior career*
Years	Team	Apps	(Gls)
1925–1926	Boca Juniors	34	(4)
1927–1929	Huracán		
1929	Boca Juniors	3	(0)
1932	Sportivo Barracas		

International career
1925–1926	Argentina	11	(0)

Managerial career
- 1930–1936: Boca Juniors
- 1937: Ferro Carril Oeste
- 1944: Botafogo
- 1946: Boca Juniors
- –1950–: Lanús
- 1953: Ferro Carril Oeste
- 1954–1955: Estudiantes
- 1956: Boca Juniors
- Racing Club
- Chacarita Juniors
- Rosario Central
- * Club domestic league appearances and goals

Mario Francisco Fortunato (1904 – 10 January 1970) was an Argentine football player and manager. Fortunato won three championships as a player with Boca Juniors and went on to lead the club to four Primera División and two domestic cups as manager.

== Playing career ==
=== Club ===
Fortunato began playing for Boca Juniors in 1925. He made his debut on 1 September in a 2–0 win against Palermo. He played for the club until 1926, winning three titles in those years: Copa de Competencia Jockey Club (1925), Primera División (1926) and Copa Estímulo (also in 1926).

In 1927, he joined Huracán, where he played until 1929. He returned to Boca and played 3 more games for the club in September and October 1929.

Fortunato retired early due to a knee injury, but continued to play in the Argentine amateur league with Sportivo Barracas in the 1932 season.

=== National team ===
Fortunato played 11 games for Argentina, making his debut in a 2–0 win against Paraguay on 29 November 1925. He was part of the squad for the 1926 South American Championship (current "Copa América"), where Argentina finished as runners-up.

== Managerial career ==
Fortunato became manager of Boca Juniors in 1930 at the age of 26. He led the team to four league titles in 1930, 1931, 1934 and 1935. He returned to the club in 1946 and 1956 and amassed 351 games in charge of the club. Of these games, he won 226, drew 57 and lost 68.

Fortunato also served as the manager of Ferro Carril Oeste, Racing, Chacarita Juniors, Botafogo of Brazil, Rosario Central and Estudiantes de La Plata. In 1950 he led Club Atlético Lanús to the second division championship.

== Honours ==
=== Player ===
Boca Juniors

- Primera División (1): 1926
- Copa de Competencia Jockey Club (1): 1925
- Copa Ibarguren (1): 1924 (Note: The cup final was played in 1926.)

=== Manager ===
Boca Juniors

- Argentine Primera División (4): 1930, 1931, 1934, 1935
- Copa de Competencia Británica (1): 1946
- Copa Escobar-Gerona (1): 1946

Lanús

- Segunda División (1): 1950
