= Eliseo Mouriño =

Argentine footballer

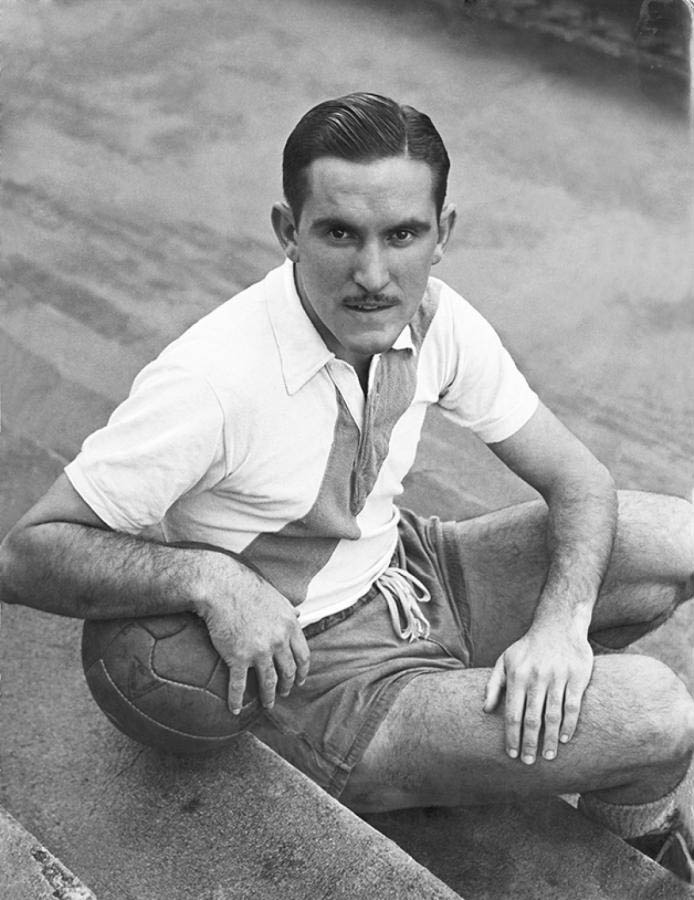
- Mouriño posing for El Gráfico in 1951

Personal information
- Full name: Eliseo Víctor Mouriño Oyarbide
- Date of birth: 3 June 1927
- Place of birth: Buenos Aires, Argentina
- Date of death: 3 April 1961 (aged 33)
- Place of death: Nevado de Longaví, Chile
- Height: 1.68 m (5 ft 6 in)
- Position: Midfielder

Youth career
- Banfield

Senior career*
Years	Team	Apps	(Gls)
1948–1952	Banfield	133	(2)
1953–1960	Boca Juniors	145	(4)
1961	Green Cross	0	(0)
Total		278	(6)

International career
1952–1959	Argentina	21	(0)
- * Club domestic league appearances and goals

Eliseo Víctor Mouriño Oyarbide (3 June 1927 – 3 April 1961) was an Argentine footballer. He began his career at Club Atlético Banfield before moving to join Boca Juniors with whom he won an Argentine league title in 1954. He played as a holding midfielder for the early part of his career before converting to centre-back and was part of the Argentina squad at the 1958 FIFA World Cup. He died in a plane crash in 1961.

== Achievements ==
=== Club ===
- Boca Juniors
  - Primera División: 1954

=== International ===
- Argentina
  - Copa América: 1955, 1959
