= Carlos Sosa (footballer) =

Argentine footballer and manager

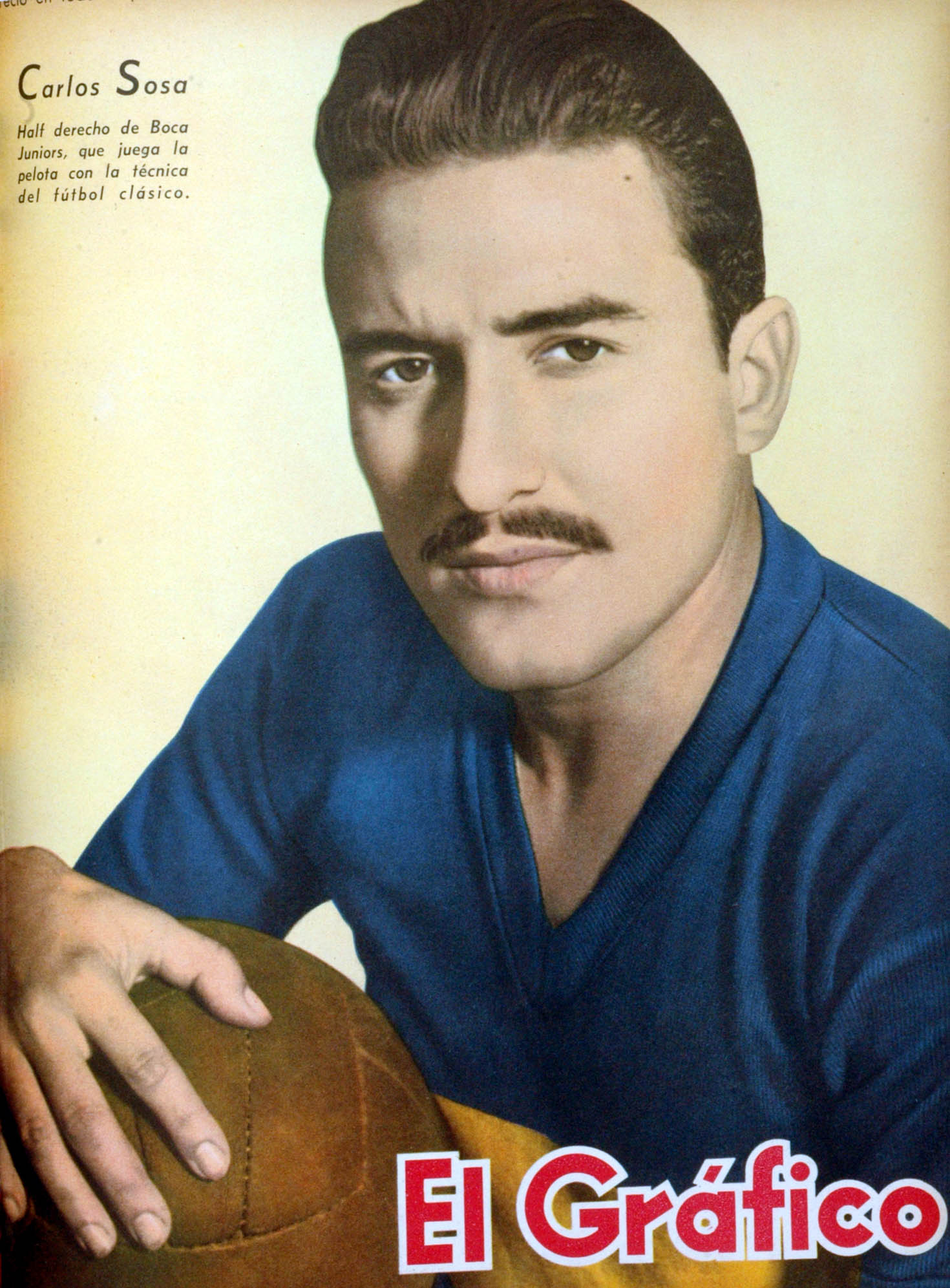
- Sosa while playing for Boca Juniors, 1944

Personal information
- Full name: Carlos Adolfo Sosa
- Date of birth: 21 July 1919
- Place of birth: Buenos Aires, Argentina
- Date of death: 2 March 2009 (aged 89)
- Place of death: Buenos Aires, Argentina
- Positions: Defender; right midfielder

Senior career*
Years	Team	Apps	(Gls)
1939–1941	Atlanta	17	(2)
1941–1951	Boca Juniors	294	(9)
1952–1958	Racing Paris	128	(4)
1958–1959	Red Star		

International career
1942–1946	Argentina	12	(0)

Managerial career
- 1960: Boca Juniors
- * Club domestic league appearances and goals

Carlos Adolfo "Lucho" Sosa (21 July 1919 – 2 March 2009) was an Argentine footballer who played as a midfielder. He spent most of his career in Boca Juniors, where he won six titles. With the Argentina national team he also won two Copa América.

Sosa is considered one of the best right halves in the history of Argentine football, apart from being an emblematic player of Boca Juniors during the 1940s.

== Playing career ==
Sosa started his career with Atlanta, debuting in Primera División on 30 July 1939 v Chacarita Juniors. His initial position was left back. Sosa's good performances on the field sparkled interest in Boca Juniors, which finally acquired Sosa for $25,000 plus the transfers of players Vilana, Tenorio and Angeletti. Boca also gave Atlanta the ...... of a friendly match played in Ferro Carril Oeste stadium. His last match with Atlanta was on 22 December 1940 v Independiente, playing a total of 40 games with the club.

At his arrival to Boca Juniors, Sosa played several matches in lower divisions until he was promoted to the first squad in 1941, being part of a memorable midfield line along with Ernesto Lazzatti and Natalio Pescia. At the end of the year 1951, he left for France to play with RC Paris and Red Star, where he ended his career in 1958. He played a total of 271 matches with Boca Juniors, also scoring 7 goals. With the Xeneize Sosa also won six titles, including two Primera División championships.

Sosa left Boca Juniors after 10 years in the club, being replaced by Francisco Lombardo. Sosa continued his career in France when he joined Racing Club Paris. Sosa stayed here for seven years, playing as inside forward and central midfielder.

== Managerial career ==
After retiring from football, he became manager, coaching Boca Juniors in 1960, but after matchday 10 of the championship in July – 4 wins, 5 draws, 1 defeat, 17–9 goals – he resigned because of the unsuccessful results. José D'Amico, who later coached the national team for several matches, followed him in the office. Sosa was also manager of San Telmo and Uruguayan club Racing Club de Montevideo.

== Playing style ==
Sosa was a skillful player with good ball control, which allowed him to advance to the rival goal in attacking positions. He also had a strong shot so he was in charge of the free kicks on the right side of the field. Despite his abilities, Argentina's coach, Guillermo Stábile, did not call him up for the national team. Some versions state that he considered Sosa "dribbled excessively", preferring more aggressive players for defensive positions, such as Norberto Yácono or Juan Carlos Fonda.

== In his own words ==
There (in France) they play with cold, rain and snow, and they train hard because they run a lot. Ninety minutes are played fiercely. You have to be well prepared for that. My routine consists of a training session in the morning, lunch, rest, and return to work. Nobody protests, everyone does it at ease, since they know that it is their obligation. The club calls you in an unforeseen way with a telephone call, or by means of a cable (that arrives and fast) for any hour of the day, and there you go "chito" (in silence) and punctual. And something else. Each player on arrival greets each of their classmates with a handshake at every opportunity. They enjoy the pleasure of feeling they are courteous.

— Sosa about his experience in Europe during an interview with former teammate and journalist Ernesto Lazzatti,

== Honours ==
Boca Juniors

- Primera División: 1943, 1944
- Copa Ibarguren: 1944
- Copa de Competencia Británica: 1946
- Copa Escobar-Gerona: 1945, 1946

Argentina

- Copa América: 1945, 1946

=== Individual ===
- IFFHS Argentina All Times Dream Team (Team B): 2021
