= Severino Varela =

Uruguayan footballer (1913-1995)

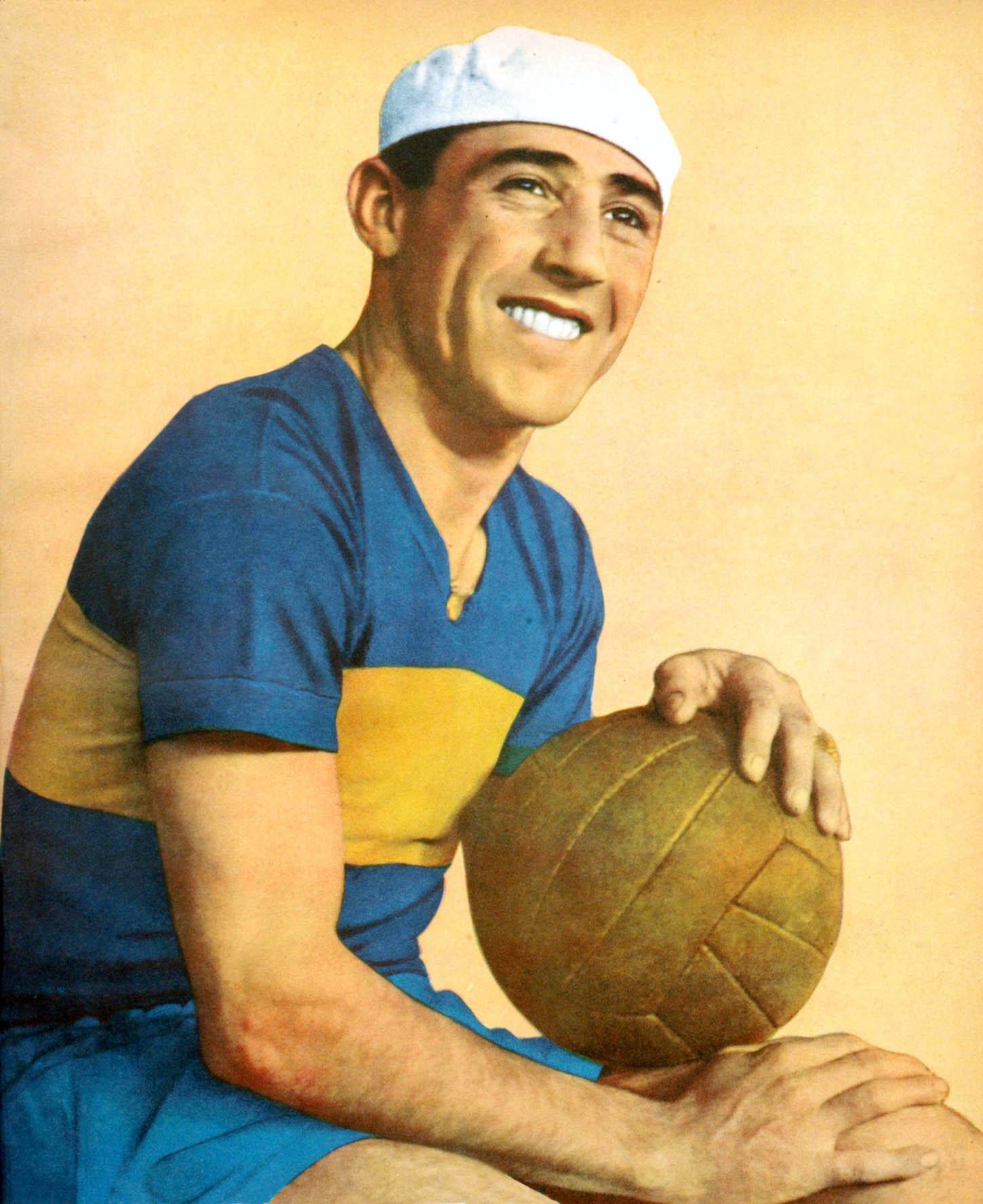
- Varela in 1943

Personal information
- Full name: Severino Varela Puente
- Date of birth: 14 September 1913
- Place of birth: Montevideo, Uruguay
- Date of death: 29 July 1995 (aged 81)
- Position: Striker

Senior career*
Years	Team	Apps	(Gls)
1932–1935	River Plate Montevideo		
1935–1942	Peñarol	74	(46)
1943–1945	Boca Juniors	67	(43)
1946–1947	Peñarol		

International career
1935–1942	Uruguay	24	(19)
Medal record
Men's football
Representing Uruguay
South American Championship
Winner	1942 Uruguay
Runner-up	1939 Peru
Third place	1937 Argentina
- * Club domestic league appearances and goals

Severino Varela Puente (14 September 1913 – 29 July 1995) was a Uruguayan footballer who played as a striker. With 15 goals, he is Uruguay's all-time top scorer at the Copa América.

== Career ==
Varela started his playing career in 1932 with River Plate Montevideo. In 1935, he signed for Peñarol where he was part of the team that won four successive league titles between 1935 and 1938.

Varela was part of Uruguay squad which won 1942 South American Championship, and remainis as third joint top scorer in the history of Copa América.

In 1942, Varela joined Argentine side Boca Juniors for $32.800. Boca also transferred Emeal and Laferrara to Peñarol as part of the transaction. During the first year of his career in the club of La Ribera, Varela continued living and working in Uruguay (where he shipped each Sunday after the match). Due to the many goals he had scored for Boca Juniors in that year, the club offered him to sign a new contract with a much better salary, but under the condition he had to move to Buenos Aires to live there and to train with the rest of the squad. Varela refused the offer explaining that he could not leave his current job, because, unlike football, it would be his job for the rest of his life.

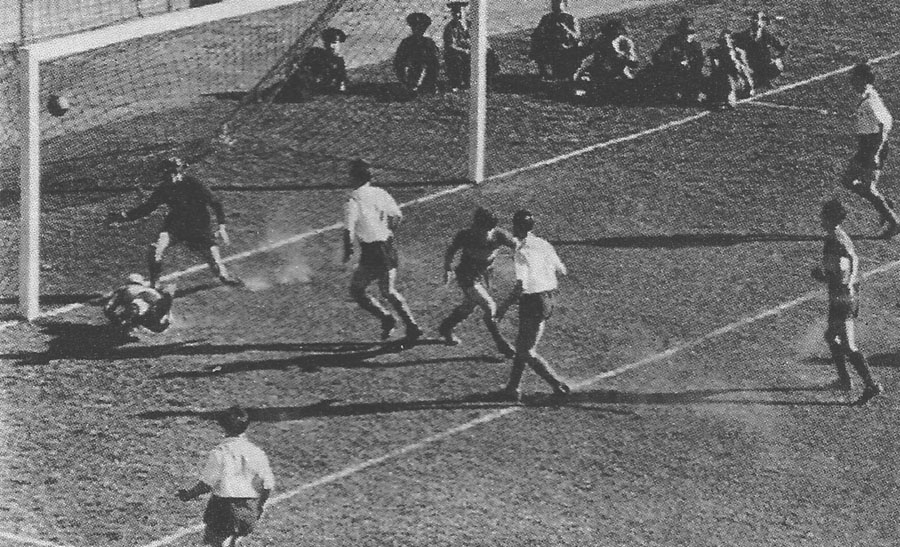
Varela scoring his most famous goal against River Plate in 1943.

As a footballer, Varela was a great header, skilled to control the ball, with a fierce attitude to play. He also never missed when shooting a penalty kick. His wearing of a white beret on the field gave him a distinctive range. During his tenure in Boca Juniors, he scored 43 goals within 3 years. 16 of them were headers, 14 from penalty kicks (he did not miss anyone) and 13 of free-kicking shots.

Varela gained recognition amongst Boca Juniors' fans because of his goals to River Plate (playing a total of 6 derbies and scoring in 5). The most remembered of his goals happened in September 26, 1943, when Varela headed the ball after a long pass by Carlos Sosa, diving into the goal and scoring before the ball went outside the field. This goal (defined by Crónica newspaper as El golazo del misterio - The great goal of mystery) allowed Boca to win that match 1-0 and therefore the Xeneizes became new Argentine champions, acclaiming Varela as its new great idol.

After winning the titles of 1943 and 1944 with Boca Juniors, the club asked him for the salary he wanted to earn: Varela replied that "he would not take the money he could not win by himself". He left Boca Juniors as a free agent.

Once his run in Boca Juniors was finished, Varela returned to Peñarol where he played out his career.

== Career statistics ==
=== International ===
Appearances and goals by national team and year
National team	Year	Apps	Goals
Uruguay	1935	1	0
Uruguay	1936	2	0
Uruguay	1937	6	5
Uruguay	1938	1	1
Uruguay	1939	4	5
Uruguay	1940	4	3
Uruguay	1941	0	0
Uruguay	1942	6	5
Total		24	19

== Honours ==
Peñarol

- Uruguayan Primera División: 1935, 1936, 1937, 1938

Boca Juniors

- Argentine Primera División: 1943, 1944

Uruguay

- South American Championship/Copa América: 1942
