= 1954 Argentine Primera División =

63rd season of top-tier football league in Argentina

Primera División
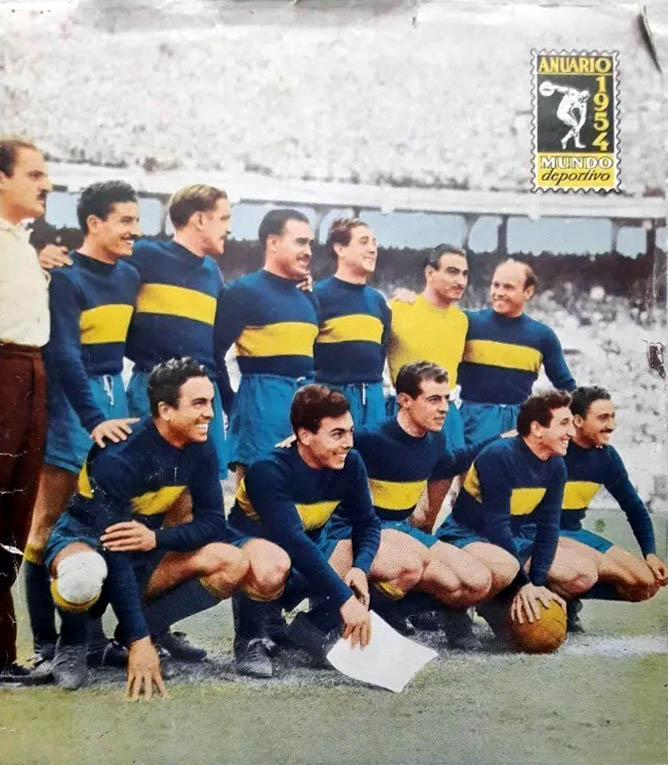
- Boca Juniors, champions
- Season: 1954
- Champions: Boca Juniors (13th title)
- Promoted: Tigre
- Relegated: Banfield
- Top goalscorer: (Paraguay) Ángel Berni (Argentina) José Borello (Argentina) Norberto Conde (19 goals each)

The 1954 Argentine Primera División was the 63rd season of top-flight football in Argentina. The season began on April 4 and ended on November 14.

Tigre returned to Primera while Banfield was relegated. Boca Juniors won its 13th league title

== League standings ==
Pos	Team	Pld	W	D	L	GF	GA	GD	Pts
1	Boca Juniors	30	21	3	6	60	26	+34	45
2	Independiente	30	15	11	4	61	29	+32	41
3	River Plate	30	16	6	8	56	37	+19	38
4	Platense	30	10	13	7	54	50	+4	33
4	Lanús	30	11	11	8	45	51	−6	33
6	Ferro Carril Oeste	30	8	16	6	42	41	+1	32
7	San Lorenzo	30	12	7	11	58	48	+10	31
8	Chacarita Juniors	30	10	9	11	37	40	−3	29
9	Vélez Sársfield	30	10	8	12	50	47	+3	28
10	Racing	30	10	7	13	42	54	−12	27
11	Newell's Old Boys	30	9	8	13	49	55	−6	26
11	Rosario Central	30	9	8	13	45	52	−7	26
11	Tigre	30	11	4	15	42	50	−8	26
14	Gimnasia y Esgrima (LP)	30	8	8	14	48	71	−23	24
15	Huracán	30	5	13	12	46	59	−13	23
16	Banfield	30	6	6	18	33	58	−25	18
