= 1943 Argentine Primera División =

52nd season of top-tier football league in Argentina

Primera División
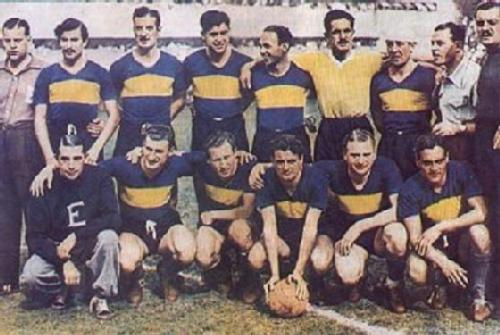
- Boca Juniors, champions
- Season: 1943
- Champions: Boca Juniors (11th title)
- Promoted: Rosario Central
- Relegated: Gimnasia y Esgrima (LP)
- Top goalscorer: (Argentina) Luis Arrieta (Argentina) Angel Labruna (Argentina) Raúl Frutos (23 goals each)

The 1943 Argentine Primera División was the 52nd season of top-flight football in Argentina. The season began on April 18 and ended on December 5.

Boca Juniors won its 11th league title while Gimnasia y Esgrima (LP) was relegated.

== League standings ==
Pos	Team	Pld	W	D	L	GF	GA	GD	Pts
1	Boca Juniors	30	18	9	3	79	42	+37	45
2	River Plate	30	19	6	5	74	38	+36	44
3	San Lorenzo	30	14	7	9	72	53	+19	35
4	Huracán	30	13	5	12	52	51	+1	31
4	Estudiantes (LP)	30	12	7	11	53	53	0	31
6	Independiente	30	12	6	12	61	50	+11	30
6	Platense	30	12	6	12	52	52	0	30
6	Racing	30	11	8	11	54	58	−4	30
9	Rosario Central	30	11	7	12	53	54	−1	29
10	Lanús	30	10	8	12	59	58	+1	28
11	Atlanta	30	10	7	13	57	70	−13	27
12	Newell's Old Boys	30	8	10	12	44	54	−10	26
12	Chacarita Juniors	30	8	10	12	42	59	−17	26
14	Banfield	30	9	7	14	50	68	−18	25
15	Ferro Carril Oeste	30	8	7	15	41	60	−19	23
16	Gimnasia y Esgrima (LP)	30	7	6	17	54	77	−23	20
