= 1944 Argentine Primera División =

53rd season of top-tier football league in Argentina

Primera División
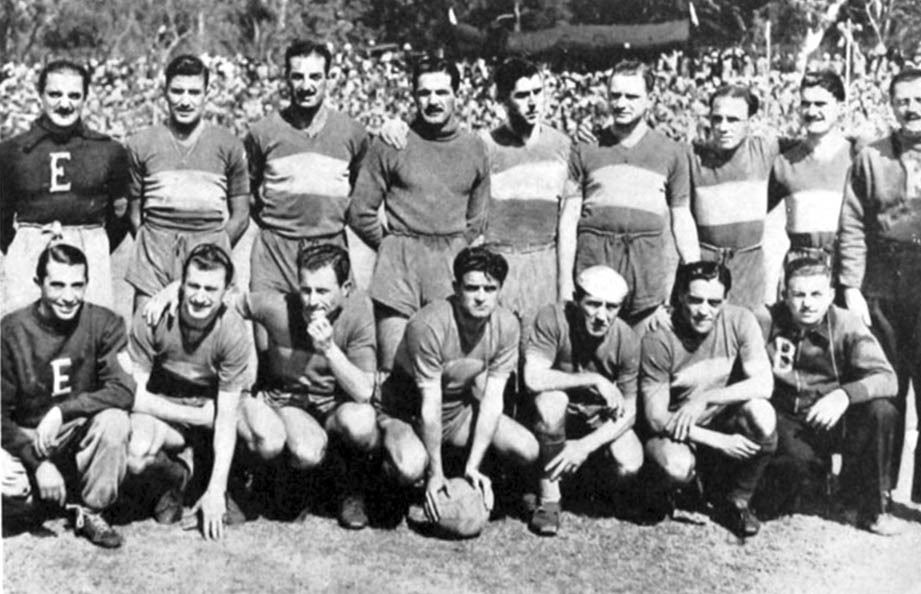
- Boca Juniors, champions
- Season: 1944
- Champions: Boca Juniors (12th title)
- Promoted: Vélez Sársfield
- Relegated: Banfield
- Top goalscorer: (Paraguay) Atilio Mellone (26 goals)

The 1944 Argentine Primera División was the 53rd season of top-flight football in Argentina. The season began on April 16 and ended on November 26.

Boca Juniors won the championship, achieving its 12th league title. Vélez Sársfield returned after promoting last year while Banfield was relegated.

== League standings ==
Pos	Team	Pld	W	D	L	GF	GA	GD	Pts
1	Boca Juniors	30	19	8	3	82	41	+41	46
2	River Plate	30	17	10	3	68	43	+25	44
3	Estudiantes (LP)	30	16	7	7	66	43	+23	39
4	San Lorenzo	30	12	10	8	61	49	+12	34
5	Independiente	30	11	11	8	55	45	+10	33
6	Racing	30	13	6	11	56	55	+1	32
7	Huracán	30	13	5	12	80	72	+8	31
7	Atlanta	30	11	9	10	63	58	+5	31
9	Newell's Old Boys	30	10	7	13	63	62	+1	27
9	Vélez Sársfield	30	10	7	13	45	49	−4	27
9	Rosario Central	30	9	9	12	50	56	−6	27
12	Platense	30	9	6	15	62	72	−10	24
13	Ferro Carril Oeste	30	7	9	14	44	67	−23	23
14	Lanús	30	7	8	15	38	65	−27	22
15	Chacarita Juniors	30	6	9	15	43	69	−26	21
16	Banfield	30	4	11	15	47	77	−30	19
