= Copa de Competencia Británica =

Copa de Competencia Británica George VI
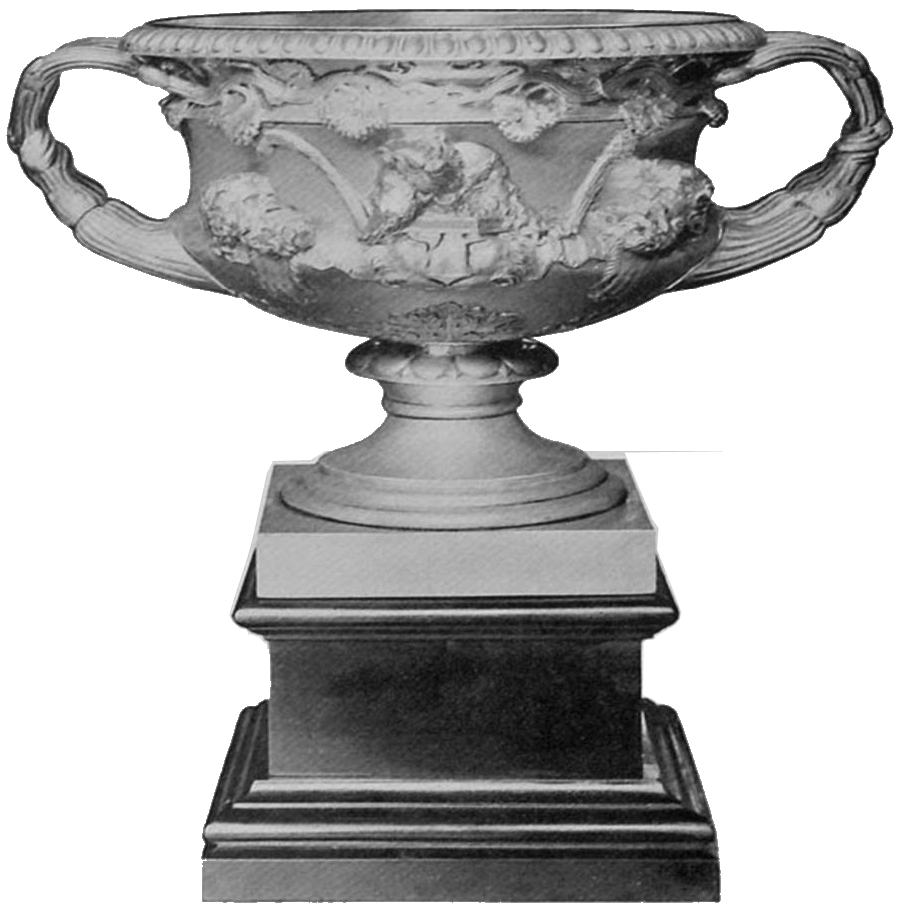
- The trophy awarded to champions
- Organiser(s): AFA
- Founded: 1944
- Abolished: 1948; 78 years ago
- Region: Argentina
- Teams: 16 (1948)
- Related competitions: Primera División
- Last champions: Boca Juniors (1946)

The Copa de Competencia Británica George VI was an official Argentine football cup competition, played from 1944 to 1948. It was contested by teams participating in Primera División.

The format was a single-elimination tournament and the first editions (1944 and 1945) allowed four semifinalist teams to play the "Copa de la República". The fourth edition was abandoned in the first stage and therefore the Argentine Football Association declared there was not a champion.

The trophy was named after King George VI and donated by the ambassador of the United Kingdom in Argentina.

== Champions ==
=== Finals ===
Ed.	Year	Champion	Score	Runner-up	Venue	City
1	1944	Huracán	4–2	Boca Juniors	San Lorenzo	Buenos Aires
2	1945	Racing	4–1	Boca Juniors	San Lorenzo	Buenos Aires
3	1946	Boca Juniors	3–1	San Lorenzo	River Plate	Buenos Aires
4	1948	(abandoned)				

=== Titles by team ===
Rank	Team	Titles	Years won
1	Huracán	1	1944
1	Racing	1	1945
1	Boca Juniors	1	1946

=== Topscorers ===
Year	Player	Goals	Club
1944	(Argentina) Norberto Méndez	6	Huracán
1945	(Argentina) Humberto Fiore	5	Racing
