= 1946 South American Championship squads =

List of footballers

The following is a list of squads for all 6 national teams that competed at the 1946 South American Championship.

== Argentina ==
Head Coach: (Argentina) Guillermo Stábile

No.	Pos.	Player	Date of birth (age)	Caps	Goals	Club
—	FW	Mario Boyé	30 July 1922 (aged 23)	6	2	(Argentine Football Association) Boca Juniors
—	FW	Vicente de la Mata	15 January 1918 (aged 27)	10	5	(Argentine Football Association) Independiente
—	DF	Juan Carlos Fonda	15 October 1919 (aged 26)	6	0	(Argentine Football Association) Platense
—	FW	Ángel Labruna	28 September 1918 (aged 27)	7	1	(Argentine Football Association) River Plate
—	FW	Félix Loustau	25 December 1922 (aged 23)	9	4	(Argentine Football Association) River Plate
—	DF	José Marante	27 February 1915 (aged 30)	3	0	(Argentine Football Association) Boca Juniors
—	FW	Rinaldo Martino	6 November 1921 (aged 24)	19	15	(Argentine Football Association) San Lorenzo
—	FW	Norberto Méndez	5 January 1923 (aged 23)	11	8	(Argentine Football Association) Huracán
—	GK	Gabriel Ogando	22 August 1921 (aged 24)	4	0	(Argentine Football Association) Estudiantes (LP)
—	DF	Saúl Ongaro	24 August 1916 (aged 29)	0	0	(Argentine Football Association) Estudiantes (LP)
—	FW	Adolfo Pedernera	15 November 1918 (aged 27)	17	5	(Argentine Football Association) River Plate
—	MF	Natalio Pescia	1 January 1922 (aged 24)	0	0	(Argentine Football Association) Boca Juniors
—	FW	René Pontoni	18 May 1920 (aged 25)	13	14	(Argentine Football Association) San Lorenzo
—	DF	José Ramos	23 February 1919 (aged 26)	10	0	(Argentine Football Association) River Plate
—	DF	Eduardo Rodríguez	20 March 1918 (aged 27)	3	0	(Argentine Football Association) River Plate
—	DF	José Salomón	9 July 1916 (aged 29)	39	0	(Argentine Football Association) Racing
—	FW	Juan Carlos Salvini		6	0	(Argentine Football Association) Huracán
—	DF	Juan Carlos Sobrero		5	0	(Argentine Football Association) Newell's Old Boys
—	DF	Carlos Sosa	21 July 1919 (aged 26)	11	0	(Argentine Football Association) Boca Juniors
—	MF	León Strembel	1 January 1918 (aged 28)	4	0	(Argentine Football Association) Racing
—	FW	Ezra Sued	7 June 1923 (aged 22)	5	2	(Argentine Football Association) Racing
—	GK	Claudio Vacca	24 October 1915 (aged 30)	2	0	(Argentine Football Association) Boca Juniors

== Bolivia ==
Head Coach: (Bolivia) Diógenes Lara

No.	Pos.	Player	Date of birth (age)	Caps	Goals	Club
—	DF	Alberto Achá	3 April 1920 (aged 25)	6	0	(Bolivian Football Federation) The Strongest
—	GK	Vicente Arraya	25 January 1922 (aged 23)	6	0	(Bolivian Football Federation) The Strongest
—	DF	José Bustamante	5 March 1921 (aged 24)	0	0	(Bolivian Football Federation) Club Litoral
—	MF	Exequiel Calderón		6	0	(Bolivian Football Federation) The Strongest
—	DF	Armando Delgadillo		0	0	(Bolivian Football Federation)
—	MF	Raúl Fernández		0	0	(Bolivian Football Federation) The Strongest
—	MF	Leonardo Ferrel	7 July 1923 (aged 22)	0	0	(Bolivian Football Federation) The Strongest
—	FW	Félix Garzón		0	0	(Bolivian Football Federation) Club Bolívar
—	FW	Zenón González	23 June 1919 (aged 26)	5	1	(Bolivian Football Federation) Club Ferroviario
—	MF	Ruperto Inchausti	27 March 1918 (aged 27)	4	0	(Bolivian Football Federation) Club Junín
—	MF	Rodolfo Maida		0	0	(Bolivian Football Federation) New Players Cochabamba
—	GK	Guillermo Navarro		0	0	(Bolivian Football Federation)
—	FW	Severo Orgaz		6	1	(Bolivian Football Federation) The Strongest
—	FW	Adrián Ortega		4	0	(Bolivian Football Federation) Club Ferroviario
—	FW	Juan Peñaloza		0	0	(Bolivian Football Federation) Deportivo Bata
—	FW	Miguel Peredo		2	0	(Bolivian Football Federation)
—	DF	Nicolás Prieto		6	0	(Bolivian Football Federation) Deportivo Bata
—	FW	Jaime Rosenbluth		0	0	(Bolivian Football Federation) The Strongest
—	FW	Armando Tapia	22 January 1922 (aged 23)	4	0	(Bolivian Football Federation) The Strongest
—	MF	Raúl Vargas		0	0	(Bolivian Football Federation) Club Ferroviario
—	FW	Serapio Vega	23 March 1919 (aged 26)	0	0	(Bolivian Football Federation) The Strongest

== Brazil ==
Head coach: (Brazil) Flávio Costa

No.	Pos.	Player	Date of birth (age)	Caps	Goals	Club
—	FW	Ademir	8 November 1922 (aged 23)	11	8	(Brazilian Football Confederation) Vasco da Gama
—	MF	Aleixo	9 April 1924 (aged 21)	0	0	(Brazilian Football Confederation) Corinthians
—	GK	Ary	13 April 1919 (aged 26)	4	0	(Brazilian Football Confederation) Botafogo
—	DF	Augusto	22 October 1920 (aged 25)	0	0	(Brazilian Football Confederation) Vasco da Gama
—	FW	Chico	7 January 1922 (aged 24)	5	1	(Brazilian Football Confederation) Vasco da Gama
—	DF	Domingos da Guia	19 December 1911 (aged 34)	22	0	(Brazilian Football Confederation) Corinthians
—	MF	Danilo	3 December 1920 (aged 25)	1	0	(Brazilian Football Confederation) Vasco da Gama
—	FW	Eduardo Lima	22 August 1920 (aged 25)	5	3	(Brazilian Football Confederation) Palmeiras
—	FW	Heleno	12 February 1920 (aged 25)	10	10	(Brazilian Football Confederation) Botafogo
—	MF	Ivan	8 April 1919 (aged 26)	1	0	(Brazilian Football Confederation) Botafogo
—	MF	Jaime de Almeida	28 August 1920 (aged 25)	12	1	(Brazilian Football Confederation) Flamengo
—	FW	Jair	21 March 1921 (aged 24)	15	8	(Brazilian Football Confederation) Vasco da Gama
—	FW	Leônidas da Silva	6 September 1913 (aged 32)	18	21	(Brazilian Football Confederation) São Paulo
—	FW	Lelé	23 March 1918 (aged 27)	4	1	(Brazilian Football Confederation) Vasco da Gama
—	GK	Luiz Borracha	1 November 1920 (aged 25)	0	0	(Brazilian Football Confederation) Flamengo
—	DF	Newton	4 June 1917 (aged 28)	4	0	(Brazilian Football Confederation) Flamengo
—	DF	Norival	5 June 1917 (aged 28)	15	0	(Brazilian Football Confederation) Flamengo
—	MF	Rui Campos	2 August 1922 (aged 23)	12	2	(Brazilian Football Confederation) São Paulo
—	FW	Teixeirinha	4 March 1922 (aged 23)	0	0	(Brazilian Football Confederation) São Paulo
—	FW	Tesourinha	3 December 1921 (aged 24)	9	2	(Brazilian Football Confederation) Internacional
—	MF	Zezé Procópio	12 August 1913 (aged 32)	16	0	(Brazilian Football Confederation) Palmeiras
—	MF	Zizinho	14 September 1921 (aged 24)	16	7	(Brazilian Football Confederation) Flamengo

== Chile ==
Head Coach: (Chile) Luis Tirado

No.	Pos.	Player	Date of birth (age)	Caps	Goals	Club
—	MF	Juan Alcántara	6 March 1920 (aged 25)	3	5	(Football Federation of Chile) Audax Italiano
—	FW	Jorge Araya	21 September 1924 (aged 21)	0	0	(Football Federation of Chile) Green Cross
—	MF	Hernán Carvallo	19 August 1922 (aged 23)	0	0	(Football Federation of Chile) Universidad Católica
—	MF	Mario Castro	23 September 1923 (aged 22)	1	0	(Football Federation of Chile) Santiago Morning
—	DF	Rodolfo Clavería	20 October 1922 (aged 23)	0	0	(Football Federation of Chile) Universidad Católica
—	FW	Atilio Cremaschi	8 March 1923 (aged 22)	1	0	(Football Federation of Chile) Unión Española
—	GK	Hernán Fernández	17 March 1921 (aged 24)	2	0	(Football Federation of Chile) Unión Española
—	DF	Guillermo Fuenzalida	24 March 1918 (aged 27)	0	0	(Football Federation of Chile) Colo-Colo
—	DF	Francisco Las Heras	4 July 1920 (aged 25)	8	0	(Football Federation of Chile) Magallanes
—	DF	José López	15 December 1922 (aged 23)	0	0	(Football Federation of Chile) Magallanes
—	MF	Víctor Mancilla	21 July 1921 (aged 24)	0	0	(Football Federation of Chile) Universidad Católica
—	FW	Desiderio Medina	10 October 1919 (aged 26)	7	3	(Football Federation of Chile) Santiago National
—	FW	Jorge Peñaloza	21 February 1922 (aged 23)	0	0	(Football Federation of Chile) Colo-Colo
—	DF	Domingo Pino	10 March 1922 (aged 23)	0	0	(Football Federation of Chile) Magallanes
—	FW	Domingo Romo	17 April 1917 (aged 28)	0	0	(Football Federation of Chile) Audax Italiano
—	FW	Francisco Ruiz		0	0	(Football Federation of Chile) Green Cross
—	MF	Osvaldo Sáez	13 August 1923 (aged 22)	0	0	(Football Federation of Chile) Santiago Wanderers
—	DF	Santiago Salfate	12 January 1916 (aged 30)	6	0	(Football Federation of Chile) Green Cross
—	MF	José Sepúlveda	30 November 1922 (aged 23)	0	0	(Football Federation of Chile) Universidad de Chile
—	FW	Erasmo Vera	13 March 1923 (aged 22)	5	1	(Football Federation of Chile) Santiago Morning

== Paraguay ==
Head Coach: (Paraguay) Aurelio González

No.	Pos.	Player	Date of birth (age)	Caps	Goals	Club
—	FW	Delfín Benítez Cáceres	24 October 1910 (aged 35)	4	0	(Paraguayan Football Association) Libertad
—	MF	Francisco Calonga		0	0	(Paraguayan Football Association) Olimpia
—	MF	Castor Cantero	12 January 1918 (aged 28)	3	0	(Paraguayan Football Association) Olimpia
—	DF	Martín Carballo		2	0	(Paraguayan Football Association) Olimpia
—	DF	Amado Casco		0	0	(Paraguayan Football Association) Libertad
—	MF	Doroteo Coronel		0	0	(Paraguayan Football Association) Club Nacional
—	FW	Nemesio Ferreira		0	0	
—	MF	Isidoro García		0	0	(Argentine Football Association) Chacarita Juniors
—	GK	Sinforiano García	22 August 1924 (aged 21)	0	0	(Paraguayan Football Association) Cerro Porteño
—	FW	Alejandrino Genés		0	0	(Paraguayan Football Association) Club Nacional
—	DF	Enrique Hugo		0	0	(Paraguayan Football Association) Guaraní
—	FW	Leocadio Marín		0	0	(Paraguayan Football Association) Olimpia
—	MF	Julio César Ramírez		0	0	(Argentine Football Association) Huracán
—	FW	Albino Rodríguez		0	0	(Paraguayan Football Association) River Plate
—	FW	Porfirio Rolón	4 May 1925 (aged 20)	0	0	(Paraguayan Football Association) Libertad
—	FW	Vicente Sánchez		5	1	(Paraguayan Football Association) Club Nacional
—	FW	Martín Viadiú		0	0	(Paraguayan Football Association) Sol de América
—	FW	Juan Bautista Villalba	29 August 1924 (aged 21)	0	0	(Paraguayan Football Association) Sportivo Luqueño

== Uruguay ==
Head Coach: (Uruguay) Aníbal Tejada / (Uruguay) Guzmán Vila Gomensoro

No.	Pos.	Player	Date of birth (age)	Caps	Goals	Club
—	MF	José Cajiga	24 September 1926 (aged 19)	2	0	(Uruguayan Football Association) Rampla Juniors
—	FW	Ramón Castro	20 February 1921 (aged 24)	0	0	(Uruguayan Football Association) Montevideo Wanderers
—	MF	Ubire Durán	21 June 1920 (aged 25)	1	0	(Uruguayan Football Association) Rampla Juniors
—	MF	José García	21 February 1926 (aged 19)	6	2	(Uruguayan Football Association) Defensor Sporting
—	FW	Walter Gómez	12 December 1927 (aged 18)	0	0	(Uruguayan Football Association) Central Español
—	DF	Mario Lorenzo		0	0	(Uruguayan Football Association) Peñarol
—	MF	Alcides Mañay	18 January 1927 (aged 18)	1	0	(Uruguayan Football Association) Defensor Sporting
—	GK	Roque Máspoli	12 October 1917 (aged 28)	6	0	(Uruguayan Football Association) Peñarol
—	FW	José María Medina	13 February 1921 (aged 24)	4	2	(Uruguayan Football Association) Nacional
—	FW	José María Ortiz		6	2	(Uruguayan Football Association) Peñarol
—	GK	Aníbal Paz	21 May 1917 (aged 28)	15	0	(Uruguayan Football Association) Nacional
—	DF	Raúl Pini	2 June 1923 (aged 22)	4	0	(Uruguayan Football Association) Nacional
—	DF	Sixto Possamai		0	0	(Uruguayan Football Association) Peñarol
—	DF	Luis Prais	24 February 1925 (aged 20)	0	0	(Uruguayan Football Association) Peñarol
—	FW	Juan Riephoff		9	2	(Uruguayan Football Association) Rampla Juniors
—	MF	Luis Sabatel		0	0	(Uruguayan Football Association) Rampla Juniors
—	FW	Raúl Schiaffino	7 December 1923 (aged 22)	1	0	(Uruguayan Football Association) Peñarol
—	DF	Eusebio Tejera	6 January 1922 (aged 24)	5	0	(Uruguayan Football Association) Nacional
—	DF	Obdulio Varela	20 September 1917 (aged 28)	21	5	(Uruguayan Football Association) Peñarol
—	FW	José Vásquez		4	1	(Uruguayan Football Association) Peñarol
—	FW	Luis Volpi	5 December 1920 (aged 25)	5	0	(Uruguayan Football Association) Nacional
—	FW	Bibiano Zapirain	2 December 1919 (aged 26)	16	4	(Uruguayan Football Association) Nacional
