= 1945 South American Championship squads =

List of footballers

These are the squads for the countries that played in the 1945 South American Championship. The participating countries were Argentina, Bolivia, Brazil, Chile, Colombia (for the first time), Ecuador, and Uruguay. Paraguay and Peru withdrew from the tournament. The teams plays in a single round-robin tournament, earning two points for a win, one point for a draw, and zero points for a loss. Colombia was represented by the club Junior.

== Argentina ==
Head Coach: (Argentina) Guillermo Stábile

No.	Pos.	Player	Date of birth (age)	Caps	Goals	Club
—	GK	Fernando Bello	29 November 1910 (aged 34)	8	0	(Argentine Football Association) Independiente
—	FW	Mario Boyé	30 July 1922 (aged 22)	0	0	(Argentine Football Association) Boca Juniors
—	MF	Bartolomé Colombo	24 August 1916 (aged 28)	10	0	(Argentine Football Association) San Lorenzo
—	FW	Vicente de la Mata	15 January 1918 (aged 26)	6	3	(Argentine Football Association) Independiente
—	DF	Rodolfo de Zorzi	27 July 1921 (aged 23)	2	0	(Argentine Football Association) Rosario Central
—	MF	Enrique Espinoza	24 December 1921 (aged 23)	3	0	(Argentine Football Association) Atlanta
—	FW	Armando Farro	20 December 1922 (aged 22)	0	0	(Argentine Football Association) San Lorenzo
—	FW	Juan José Ferraro	5 November 1923 (aged 21)	0	0	(Argentine Football Association) Vélez Sársfield
—	MF	Alfredo Fógel	11 February 1919 (aged 25)	0	0	(Argentine Football Association) Rosario Central
—	FW	Félix Loustau	25 December 1922 (aged 22)	2	1	(Argentine Football Association) River Plate
—	FW	Rinaldo Martino	6 November 1921 (aged 23)	7	5	(Argentine Football Association) San Lorenzo
—	FW	Norberto Méndez	5 January 1923 (aged 22)	1	0	(Argentine Football Association) Huracán
—	FW	Juan Carlos Muñoz	4 March 1919 (aged 25)	6	1	(Argentine Football Association) River Plate
—	DF	Nicolás Palma		0	0	(Argentine Football Association) Estudiantes (LP)
—	FW	Manuel Pellegrina	29 November 1919 (aged 25)	3	1	(Argentine Football Association) Estudiantes (LP)
—	MF	Ángel Perucca	19 August 1918 (aged 26)	12	2	(Argentine Football Association) Newell's Old Boys
—	MF	Natalio Pescia	1 January 1922 (aged 23)	0	0	(Argentine Football Association) Boca Juniors
—	FW	René Pontoni	18 May 1920 (aged 24)	5	9	(Argentine Football Association) Newell's Old Boys
—	GK	Héctor Ricardo	10 February 1925 (aged 19)	2	0	(Argentine Football Association) Rosario Central
—	DF	José Salomón	9 July 1916 (aged 28)	28	0	(Argentine Football Association) Racing Club
—	MF	Óscar Sastre	25 December 1920 (aged 24)	1	0	(Argentine Football Association) Independiente
—	MF	Carlos Sosa	21 July 1919 (aged 25)	3	0	(Argentine Football Association) Boca Juniors
—	DF	Roberto Yebra	18 June 1919 (aged 25)	0	0	(Argentine Football Association) Rosario Central

== Bolivia ==
Head Coach: (Bolivia) Julio Borelli

No.	Pos.	Player	Date of birth (age)	Caps	Goals	Club
—	DF	Alberto Achá	3 April 1920 (aged 24)	0	0	(Bolivian Football Federation) The Strongest
—	GK	Vicente Arraya	25 January 1922 (aged 22)	0	0	(Argentine Football Association) Atlanta
—	MF	Exequiel Calderón		0	0	(Bolivian Football Federation) The Strongest
—	MF	Raúl Fernández		0	0	(Bolivian Football Federation) The Strongest
—	FW	Zenón Gonzáles	23 June 1919 (aged 25)	0	0	(Bolivian Football Federation) Club Ferroviario
—	FW	Fortunato Gorostiaga		0	0	(Bolivian Football Federation)
—	MF	Manuel Gutiérrez		0	0	(Bolivian Football Federation) Club Bolívar
—	MF	Ruperto Inchausti	27 March 1918 (aged 26)	0	0	(Bolivian Football Federation) Club Junín
—	FW	Donato Medrano		0	0	(Bolivian Football Federation)
—	FW	Severo Orgaz		0	0	(Bolivian Football Federation) The Strongest
—	FW	Walter Orozco	8 January 1922 (aged 23)	0	0	(Bolivian Football Federation) Club Bolívar
—	FW	Adrián Ortega		0	0	(Bolivian Football Federation) Club Ferroviario
—	FW	Miguel Peredo		0	0	(Bolivian Football Federation)
—	GK	Cleto Prieto		0	0	(Bolivian Football Federation)
—	DF	Nicolás Prieto		0	0	(Bolivian Football Federation) Deportivo Bata
—	DF	Hernán Rojas		0	0	(Bolivian Football Federation) Club Bolívar
—	FW	Roque Romero		0	0	(Bolivian Football Federation) Club Bolívar
—	MF	Martín Saavedra		0	0	(Bolivian Football Federation) The Strongest
—	FW	Armando Tapia	22 January 1922 (aged 22)	0	0	(Bolivian Football Federation) Club Ferroviario

== Brazil ==
Head coach: (Brazil) Flávio Costa

No.	Pos.	Player	Date of birth (age)	Caps	Goals	Club
—	FW	Ademir	8 November 1922 (aged 22)	0	0	(Brazilian Football Confederation) Vasco da Gama
—	MF	Alfredo	1 January 1920 (aged 25)	1	0	(Brazilian Football Confederation) Vasco da Gama
—	DF	Begliomini	27 November 1914 (aged 30)	3	0	(Brazilian Football Confederation) Corinthians
—	MF	Biguá	22 March 1921 (aged 23)	0	0	(Brazilian Football Confederation) Flamengo
—	DF	Da Guia	19 December 1911 (aged 33)	12	0	(Brazilian Football Confederation) Corinthians
—	MF	Danilo	3 December 1920 (aged 24)	0	0	(Brazilian Football Confederation) America-RJ
—	FW	Djalma	19 December 1918 (aged 26)	0	0	(Brazilian Football Confederation) Vasco da Gama
—	FW	Heleno	12 February 1920 (aged 24)	1	1	(Brazilian Football Confederation) Botafogo
—	MF	Jaime de Almeida	28 August 1920 (aged 24)	2	0	(Brazilian Football Confederation) Flamengo
—	MF	Jair	21 March 1921 (aged 23)	7	4	(Brazilian Football Confederation) Vasco da Gama
—	FW	Jorginho	30 May 1924 (aged 20)	0	0	(Brazilian Football Confederation) America-RJ
—	GK	Jurandir	26 April 1913 (aged 31)	5	0	(Brazilian Football Confederation) Flamengo
—	DF	Newton	4 June 1917 (aged 27)	0	0	(Brazilian Football Confederation) Flamengo
—	DF	Norival	5 June 1917 (aged 27)	7	0	(Brazilian Football Confederation) Fluminense
—	GK	Oberdan	12 June 1919 (aged 25)	2	0	(Brazilian Football Confederation) Palmeiras
—	FW	Pedro Amorim	13 October 1919 (aged 25)	7	3	(Brazilian Football Confederation) Fluminense
—	MF	Rui Campos	2 August 1922 (aged 22)	2	1	(Brazilian Football Confederation) São Paulo
—	FW	Servilio	15 April 1914 (aged 30)	4	1	(Brazilian Football Confederation) Corinthians
—	FW	Tesourinha	3 December 1921 (aged 23)	1	1	(Brazilian Football Confederation) Internacional
—	FW	Vevé	14 March 1918 (aged 26)	0	0	(Brazilian Football Confederation) Flamengo
—	MF	Zezé Procopio	12 August 1913 (aged 31)	12	0	(Brazilian Football Confederation) São Paulo
—	MF	Zizinho	14 September 1921 (aged 23)	5	2	(Brazilian Football Confederation) Flamengo

== Chile ==
Head Coach: (Hungary) Franz Platko

No.	Pos.	Player	Date of birth (age)	Caps	Goals	Club
—	MF	Juan Alcántara	6 March 1920 (aged 24)	0	0	(Football Federation of Chile) Audax Italiano
—	FW	Benito Armingol	7 September 1919 (aged 25)	6	1	(Football Federation of Chile) Unión Española
—	MF	Carlos Ataglich	21 September 1915 (aged 29)	0	0	(Football Federation of Chile) Bádminton
—	MF	Florencio Barrera	6 June 1915 (aged 29)	4	0	(Football Federation of Chile) Magallanes
—	MF	Miguel Busquets	15 October 1920 (aged 24)	0	0	(Football Federation of Chile) Universidad de Chile
—	MF	Mario Castro	23 September 1923 (aged 21)	0	0	(Football Federation of Chile) Santiago Morning
—	MF	Guillermo Clavero	10 October 1921 (aged 23)	0	0	(Football Federation of Chile) Everton
—	MF	Armando Contreras	15 June 1919 (aged 25)	8	2	(Football Federation of Chile) Colo-Colo
—	FW	Atilio Cremaschi	8 March 1923 (aged 21)	0	0	(Football Federation of Chile) Unión Española
—	MF	Francisco Hormazábal	4 July 1920 (aged 24)	0	0	(Football Federation of Chile) Colo-Colo
—	DF	Víctor Klein	2 October 1917 (aged 27)	0	0	(Football Federation of Chile) Santiago Morning
—	DF	Francisco Las Heras	3 July 1914 (aged 30)	2	0	(Football Federation of Chile) Magallanes
—	GK	Sergio Livingstone	26 March 1920 (aged 24)	8	0	(Football Federation of Chile) Universidad Católica
—	FW	Desiderio Medina	10 October 1919 (aged 25)	1	0	(Football Federation of Chile) Santiago National
—	MF	José Pastenes	10 July 1915 (aged 29)	8	0	(Football Federation of Chile) Colo-Colo
—	MF	Manuel Piñero	20 August 1920 (aged 24)	0	0	(Football Federation of Chile) Audax Italiano
—	DF	Humberto Roa	21 February 1912 (aged 32)	11	0	(Football Federation of Chile) Audax Italiano
—	DF	Jorge Vásquez	9 May 1922 (aged 22)	0	0	(Football Federation of Chile) Colo-Colo
—	FW	Erasmo Vera	13 March 1923 (aged 21)	0	0	(Football Federation of Chile) Santiago Morning

== Colombia ==
Head Coach: (Colombia) Roberto Meléndez (also participated as footballer)

No.	Pos.	Player	Date of birth (age)	Caps	Goals	Club
—	GK	Andrés Acosta		0	0	(Colombian Football Federation) Deportivo Santa Marta
—	GK	Humberto Arbeláez		0	0	(Colombian Football Federation) Juventud de Barranquilla
—	FW	Fulgencio Berdugo	14 June 1918 (aged 26)	0	0	(Colombian Football Federation) Junior
—	MF	Antonio de la Hoz	1920 (aged 25)	0	0	(Colombian Football Federation) Sporting de Barranquilla
—	FW	Lancáster de León		0	0	(Colombian Football Federation) Junior
—	FW	Roberto Gámez		0	0	(Colombian Football Federation) Junior
—	FW	Luis González Rubio		0	0	(Colombian Football Federation) Junior
—	FW	Rafael Granados		0	0	(Colombian Football Federation) Junior
—	MF	Isidro Joliani		1	0	(Colombian Football Federation) Junior
—	DF	Pedro Ricardo López	1912 (aged 33)	3	0	(Colombian Football Federation) Boca Juniors de Cali
—	DF	Lucas Martínez		0	0	(Colombian Football Federation) Sporting de Barranquilla
—	DF	Gabriel Mejía		0	0	(Colombian Football Federation) Junior
—	FW	Marcos Mejía		2	2	(Colombian Football Federation) Junior
—	FW	Roberto Meléndez	31 March 1912 (aged 32)	1	0	(Colombian Football Federation) Junior
—	FW	Arturo Mendoza		0	0	(Colombian Football Federation) Junior
—	DF	Juan Navarro		0	0	(Colombian Football Federation) Real Madrid Santa Marta
—	DF	Humberto Picalúa		1	0	(Colombian Football Federation) Junior
—	MF	Juan Quintero		0	0	(Colombian Football Federation) Junior
—	FW	Carlos Recio		0	0	(Colombian Football Federation) Junior
—	FW	Juan de Jesús Zapata	3 September 1916 (aged 28)	2	0	(Colombian Football Federation) Junior

== Ecuador ==
Head Coach: (Argentina) Rodolfo Orlandini

No.	Pos.	Player	Date of birth (age)	Caps	Goals	Club
—	FW	Pedro Acevedo	25 June 1915 (aged 29)	6	0	(Ecuadorian Football Federation) Aucas
—	FW	Víctor Aguayo		0	0	(Ecuadorian Football Federation) Aucas
—	FW	Luis Albán		0	0	(Ecuadorian Football Federation) Tungurahua
—	FW	Guillermo Albornoz	30 August 1923 (aged 21)	0	0	(Ecuadorian Football Federation) Sociedad Deportiva Argentina
—	FW	Enrique Álvarez	18 January 1920 (aged 24)	6	1	(Ecuadorian Football Federation) Emelec
—	MF	Carlos Garnica	23 September 1917 (aged 27)	1	0	(Ecuadorian Football Federation) Aucas
—	DF	Jorge Henríques	2 September 1921 (aged 23)	0	0	(Football Federation of Chile) Green Cross
—	FW	José María Jiménez	22 July 1921 (aged 23)	6	2	(Ecuadorian Football Federation) Patria
—	GK	Napoleón Medina	26 November 1919 (aged 25)	6	0	(Ecuadorian Football Federation) Patria
—	MF	Eloy Mejía		0	0	(Ecuadorian Football Federation) Aucas
—	FW	José Luis Mendoza		1	0	(Ecuadorian Football Federation) Emelec
—	MF	Luis Antonio Mendoza	25 August 1914 (aged 30)	10	2	(Ecuadorian Football Federation) Emelec
—	FW	Luis Montenegro		0	0	(Ecuadorian Football Federation) Aucas
—	FW	Enrique Raymondi		4	0	(Ecuadorian Football Federation) Patria
—	GK	Víctor Suárez	27 July 1921 (aged 23)	0	0	(Ecuadorian Football Federation)
—		Luis Valverde		0	0	(Ecuadorian Football Federation)
—		José Vascónez		0	0	(Ecuadorian Football Federation)
—	DF	Francisco Villagómez		0	0	(Ecuadorian Football Federation)
—	DF	Félix Leyton Zurita	22 November 1921 (aged 23)	0	0	(Ecuadorian Football Federation) Barcelona S.C.

== Uruguay ==
Head Coach: (Uruguay) José Nasazzi

No.	Pos.	Player	Date of birth (age)	Caps	Goals	Club
—	GK	Juan José Carvidón	18 August 1917 (aged 27)	3	0	(Uruguayan Football Association) Montevideo Wanderers
—	FW	Luis Ernesto Castro	31 July 1921 (aged 23)	9	4	(Uruguayan Football Association) Nacional
—	MF	José Pedro Colturi		1	0	(Uruguayan Football Association) Peñarol
—	FW	Nicolás Falero	11 January 1921 (aged 24)	0	0	(Uruguayan Football Association) Central Español
—	MF	Schubert Gambetta	14 April 1920 (aged 24)	8	1	(Uruguayan Football Association) Nacional
—	FW	Atilio García	26 August 1914 (aged 30)	0	0	(Uruguayan Football Association) Nacional
—	MF	José García	21 February 1926 (aged 18)	0	0	(Uruguayan Football Association) Defensor Sporting
—	GK	Roque Máspoli	12 October 1917 (aged 27)	0	0	(Uruguayan Football Association) Peñarol
—	FW	José María Ortíz		0	0	(Uruguayan Football Association) Peñarol
—	DF	Raúl Pini	2 June 1923 (aged 21)	0	0	(Uruguayan Football Association) Nacional
—	FW	Roberto Porta	7 June 1913 (aged 31)	21	7	(Uruguayan Football Association) Nacional
—	DF	Agustín Prado		1	0	(Uruguayan Football Association) Peñarol
—	FW	Juan Riephoff	27 February 1922 (aged 22)	4	1	(Uruguayan Football Association) Rampla Juniors
—	FW	Juan Santiago		0	0	(Uruguayan Football Association) Liverpool
—	MF	Raúl Sarro		0	0	(Uruguayan Football Association) Defensor Sporting
—	DF	Eusebio Tejera	6 January 1922 (aged 23)	0	0	(Uruguayan Football Association) River Plate
—	MF	Obdulio Varela	20 September 1917 (aged 27)	14	2	(Uruguayan Football Association) Peñarol
—	MF	General Viana	3 December 1913 (aged 31)	0	0	(Uruguayan Football Association) Nacional
—	FW	Bibiano Zapirain	2 December 1919 (aged 25)	10	4	(Uruguayan Football Association) Nacional
