= 1945 Copa Ramírez Final =

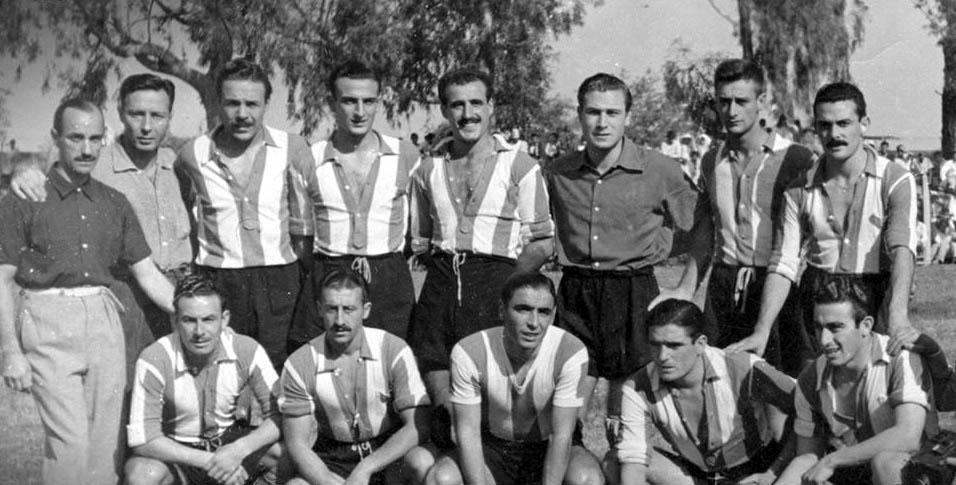
- Estudiantes de La Plata, champions
- Event: 1945 Copa P. Ramírez
Boca Juniors	Estudiantes LP
4	4
- Date: 24 March 1946
- Venue: San Lorenzo, Buenos Aires
- Referee: Eduardo Forte

1945 Copa Ramírez Final (Playoff)
- Event: 1945 Copa P. Ramírez
Boca Juniors	Estudiantes LP
0	1
- Date: 18 December 1946
- Venue: San Lorenzo, Buenos Aires
- Referee: Leopoldo Amoroso

The 1945 Copa Ramírez Final (also named Campeonato de la República) was the final match to decide the winner of the Copa General Pedro Ramírez, the 3rd (and last) edition of this Argentine national cup organised by the AFA. The final was contested by Estudiantes de La Plata and Boca Juniors.

== Qualified teams ==
Team	Previous final app.
Boca Juniors	(none)
Estudiantes de La Plata	(none)

- **Bold** indicates winning years

== Overview ==
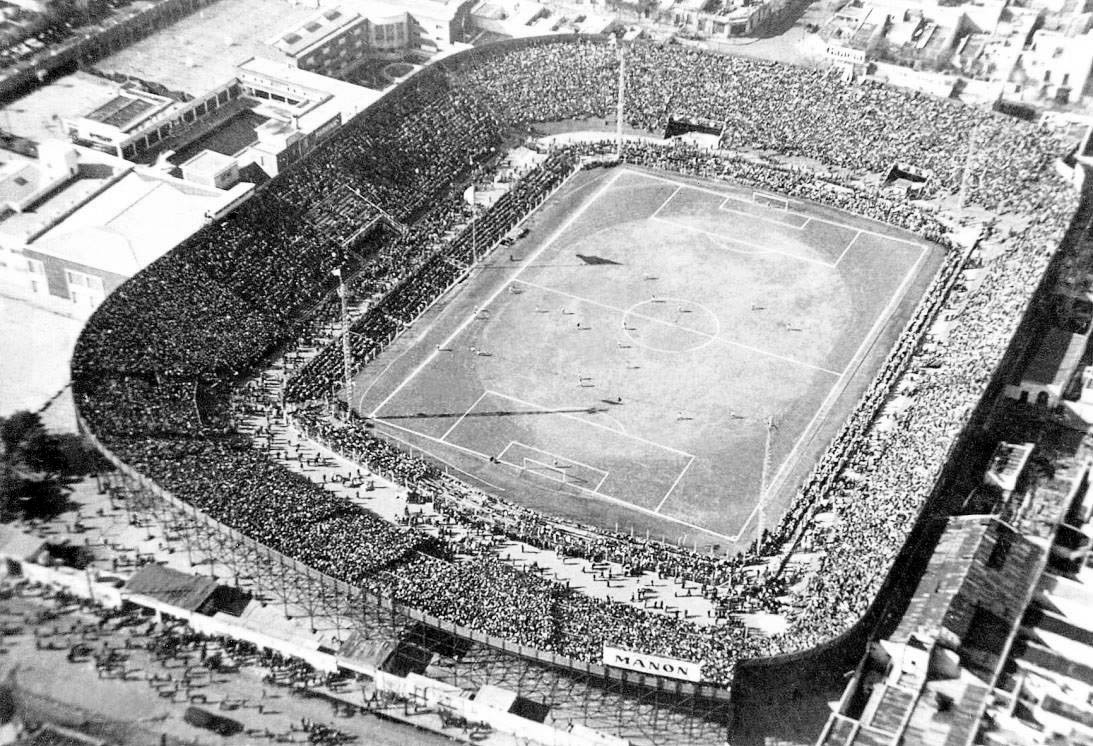
San Lorenzo Stadium, venue

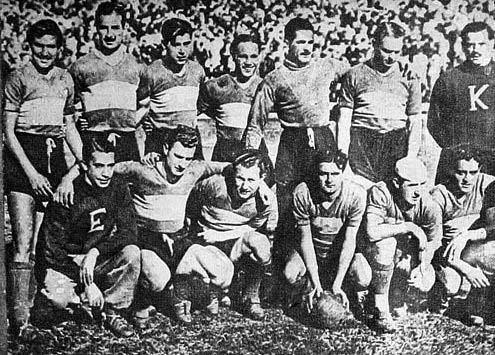
A Boca Juniors team of 1946

The cup was contested by 42 teams. The four Primera División teams that had been semifinalists in the previous editions were automatically entered into the quarter-finals, with other clubs from regional leagues having to qualify to play. Teams were divided into four groups (by province), playing each other in a single round-robin tournament.

Four Primera División teams entered directly to quarter finals, of which 2 made it to the finals, Boca Juniors and Estudiantes. Boca Juniors beat Sarmiento de Junín 3–2 and Racing 2-1 at Ferro C. Oeste. Estudiantes defeated Sarmiento de Resistencia 1–0 and Estudiantes de Santiago del Estero 3–1.

The final was played at San Lorenzo de Almagro's venue in Boedo on March 24, 1945. With 15 minutes left, Boca Juniors lead 3–1, but Estudiantes fought back and scored 3 goals within 5 minutes. With only one minute left to play, Jaime Sarlanga scored one last goal, and the game finished in a 4–4 draw. With no winner after extra time, a tiebreaker was scheduled. The match was played on December 18, 1945 in the same venue. Estudiantes won 1–0 after the match was suspended in the 83rd minute. Manuel Pelegrina was also the top goalscorer for Estudiantes, having scored 4 goals in the series, including the winning goal in the tiebreaker match.

== Road to the final ==
Note: as Primera División teams, both clubs entered directly to quarter finals.

- H: home
- A: away

Estudiantes LP		Round	Boca Juniors	
Opponent	Result	Stage	Opponent	Result
Sarmiento (R)	1–0 (A)	Quarter finals	Sarmiento (J)	3–2 (A)
Estudiantes (SdE)	3–1 (A)	Semifinals	Racing	2–1 (H) (Note: Played at Ferro Carril Oeste Stadium.)

== Match details ==
=== Final ===
1945 Copa P. Ramírez Final
24 March 1946
Final

Boca Juniors	4–4	Estudiantes LP
Pin 47', 59', 75'; Sarlanga 89'	Report	Pelegrina 67', 79', 84'; Corcuera 82' (o.g.)

San Lorenzo, Buenos Aires
Referee: Eduardo Forte

**Boca Juniors**	**Estudiantes LP**

GK	(Argentina) Claudio Vacca
DF	(Argentina) Francisco Perroncino
DF	(Argentina) Rodolfo de Zorzi
MF	(Argentina) Alberto Pascal
MF	(Argentina) Ernesto Lazzatti
MF	(Argentina) Enrique Vilanoba
FW	(Argentina) Juan Allison
FW	(Argentina) Pío Corcuera
FW	(Argentina) Jaime Sarlanga
FW	(Argentina) José A. Vázquez
FW	(Argentina) Gregorio Pin
Manager:
(Argentina) Mario Fortunato

GK	(Argentina) Gabriel Ogando
DF	(Argentina) Carlos Eguiguren
DF	(Argentina) Juan A. Ferreti
MF	(Argentina) Walter Garcerón
MF	(Argentina) Saúl Ongaro
MF	(Argentina) Santiago Ardanaz
FW	(Argentina) Julio Gagliardo
FW	(Argentina) Juan José Negri
FW	(Argentina) Juan S. Oroz
FW	(Argentina) Francisco Arbios
FW	(Argentina) Manuel Pelegrina
Manager:
(Argentina) Eduardo Sande

=== Tiebreaker ===
18 December 1946
Tiebreaker

Boca Juniors	0–1	Estudiantes LP
	Report	Pelegrina 29'

San Lorenzo, Buenos Aires
Referee: Leopoldo Amoroso

(Suspended on 83 for incidents)

**Boca Juniors**	**Estudiantes LP**

GK	(Argentina) Claudio Vacca
DF	(Argentina) José Marante
DF	(Argentina) Rodolfo de Zorzi
MF	(Argentina) Carlos Sosa
MF	(Argentina) Ernesto Lazzatti
MF	(Argentina) Natalio Pescia
FW	(Argentina) Mario Boyé
FW	(Argentina) Juan Carlos Lorenzo
FW	(Argentina) Jaime Sarlanga
FW	(Argentina) José A. Vázquez
FW	(Argentina) Gregorio Pin
Manager:
(Argentina) Mario Fortunato

GK	(Argentina) Gabriel Ogando
DF	(Argentina) Juan C. Violini
DF	(Argentina) Juan A. Ferreti
MF	(Argentina) Walter Garcerón
MF	(Argentina) Luis Villa
MF	(Argentina) Alberto Bouche
FW	(Argentina) Julio Gagliardo
FW	(Argentina) Héctor Cerioni
FW	(Argentina) Ricardo Infante
FW	(Argentina) Francisco Arbios
FW	(Argentina) Manuel Pelegrina
Manager:
(Argentina) Eduardo Sande
