= Inchausti =

Inchausti is a Basque language surname from the Basque region of Spain. Notable people with it include:

- Mario Inchausti (1915−2006), Cuban footballer
- José Ignacio Inchausti (1973−), Spanish footballer
- Ruperto Inchausti (1918−2013), Bolivian footballer
