= Victor Klein =

Victor Klein may refer to:

- Victor Klein (Danish footballer)
- Víctor Klein (Chilean footballer)
