= 1944 Copa Ramírez Final =

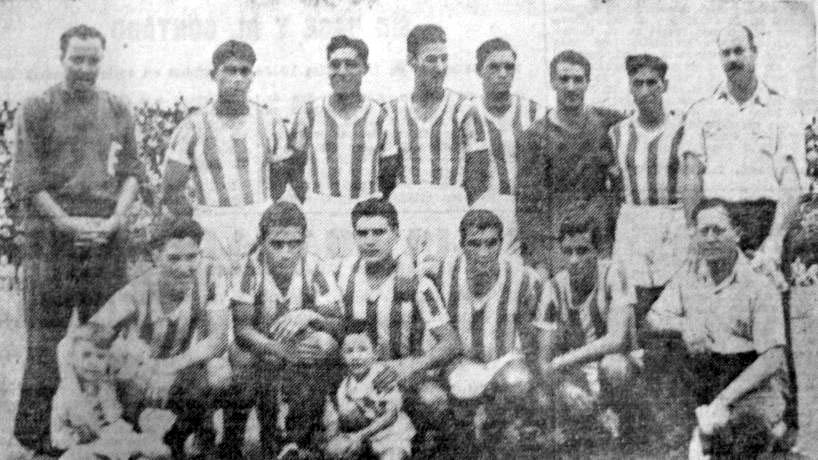
- San Martín de Tucumán, champions
- Event: 1944 Copa P. Ramírez
San Martín (T)	Newell's
3	1
- Date: 4 March 1945
- Venue: Estadio Atlético Tucumán, S.M. de Tucumán
- Referee: J. Cángaro

The 1944 Copa Ramírez Final (also named Campeonato de la República) was the final match to decide the winner of the Copa General Pedro Ramírez, the 2nd. edition of this Argentine national cup organised by the AFA. The final was contested by San Martín de Tucumán and Newell's Old Boys at Estadio Monumental José Fierro, home of local team Atlético Tucumán.

San Martín de Tucumán won 3–1, becoming the first club not directly affiliated to the Argentine Football Association to win a national competition. It is still regarded as the most important title in San Martín's history.

== Qualified teams ==
Team	Previous final app.
San Martín de Tucumán	(none)
Newell's Old Boys	(none)

- **Bold** indicates winning years

== Overview ==
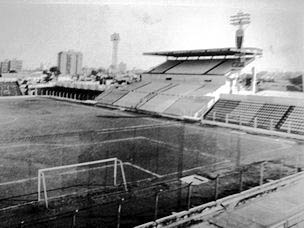
Atlético Tucumán, venue

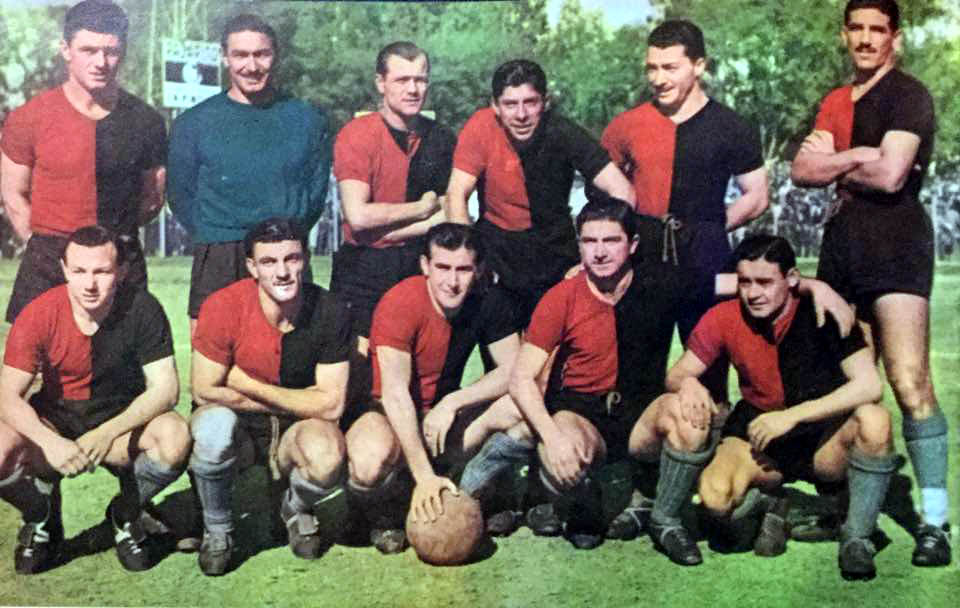
A Newell's team of 1944

The cup was contested by 50 teams. The four Primera División teams that had been semifinalists of Copa de Competencia Británica were automatically entered into the quarter-finals, with other clubs from regional leagues having to qualify to play. Teams were divided into four groups (by province), playing each other in a single round-robin tournament.

In quarter finals, San Martín eliminated Boca Juniors (11–9 on the corner kick rule, decision taken after the score remained 2–2 at the end of extra time), then eliminating Sarmiento de Resistencia also on corner kicks (12–7) after a 1–1 tie. On the other hand, Newell's eliminated Bahía Blanca's Villa Mitre after a thrashing 5–0. In semifinals, the Leprossy defeat Talleres de Córdoba 3–1. The final was scheduled to play at Estadio Monumental José Fierro, home venue of San Martín's rival Atlético Tucumán, on March 4, 1945. The decision was taken by the Tucumán Football Federation alleging comfort and security reasons.

== Road to the final ==
- H: home
- A: away
- c: won on corner kicks

San Martín		Round	Newell's O.B.	
Opponent	Result	Stage	Opponent	Result
Ñuñorco	5–0 (A)	Matchday 1	– (Note: As semifinalist of the 1944 Copa de Competencia Británica, Newell's entered directly to quarter finals.)	
C.A. Concepción	4–0 (H)	Matchday 2	–	
Boca Juniors	2–2 (11–9, c) (H)	Quarter finals	Villa Mitre	5–0 (A)
Sarmiento (R)	1–1 (12–7, c) (A)	Semifinals	Talleres (C)	3–1 (A)

== Match details ==
1944 Copa P. Ramírez Final
4 March 1945

San Martín de Tucumán	3–1	Newell's Old Boys
Juárez 5'; Díaz 36'; Brandán 48'	Report	Micci

Estadio Atlético Tucumán, S.M. Tucumán
Attendance: 15,000
Referee: J. Cángaro

**San Martín (T)**	**Newell's**

GK	(Argentina) Eduardo Larrosa
DF	(Argentina) Martin Blasco
DF	(Argentina) Carlos Lacroix
MF	(Argentina) Ernesto Figueroa
MF	(Argentina) Mario Acosta
MF	(Argentina) Mariano Comán (c)
FW	(Argentina) Angel Aguilar
FW	(Argentina) Ricardo Juárez
FW	(Argentina) Víctor Brandán
FW	(Argentina) Lirio Díaz
FW	(Argentina) Emilio Gramajo	(red card) 80'
Manager:
(Argentina) Roberto Santillán.

GK	(Argentina) Julio Musimessi
DF	(Argentina) Juan C. Sobrero
DF	(Argentina) Herrera
MF	(Argentina) Antonio Carlucci
MF	(Argentina) Nieres
MF	(Argentina) Bustos
FW	(Argentina) Bulán
FW	(Argentina) A. López
FW	(Argentina) Raúl Micci
FW	(Argentina) R. López
FW	(Argentina) Juan S. Ferreyra
Manager:
(Paraguay) Manuel Fleitas Solich
