= Juan José Negri =

Argentine footballer

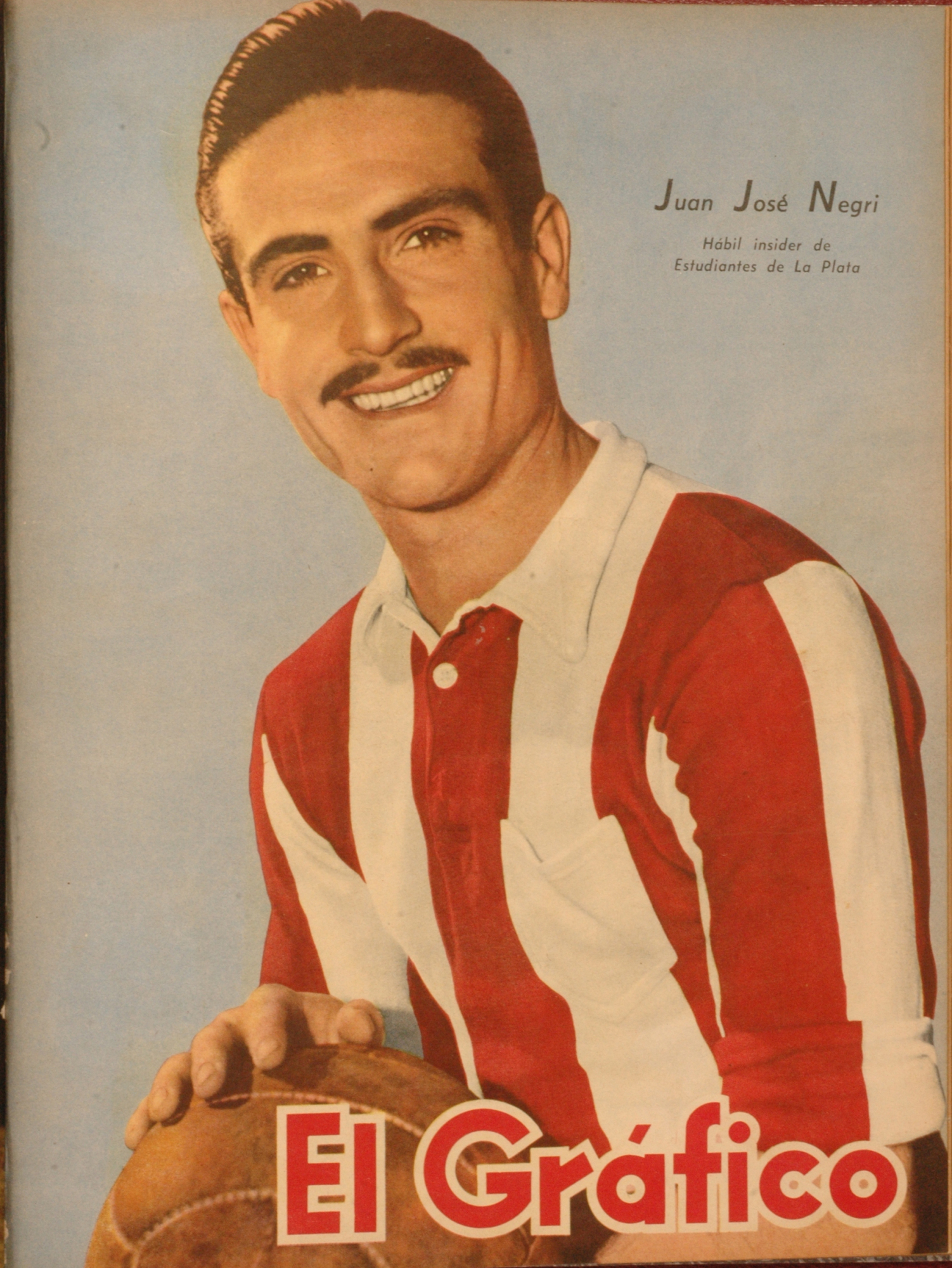

Personal information
- Full name: Juan José Eufemio Negri
- Date of birth: 8 March 1920
- Place of birth: Wilde, Argentina
- Date of death: 20 February 2003 (aged 82)
- Place of death: La Plata, Argentina
- Position: Forward

Youth career
- –1938: Estudiantes

Senior career*
| Years | Team | Apps | (Gls) |
| 1938–1947 | Estudiantes | | (83) |
| 1948–1949 | Boca Juniors | 14 | (1) |
| 1949–1950 | River Plate | 30 | (6) |
| 1951 | Platense | 26 | (4) |
| 1952 | Juventus-SP | 14 | (5) |
| 1953–1955 | São Paulo | 74 | (18) |
| 1955–1956 | Santos | 20 | (4) |
| 1956–1957 | San Luis de Quillota | | |
| 1958 | Estudiantes | | |
| 1959 | Defensores de Cambaceres | | |

International career
| 1943 | Argentina | 1 | (0) |
- * Club domestic league appearances and goals

Juan José Eufemio Negri (8 March 1920 – 20 February 2003), was an Argentine professional footballer who played as a forward.

== Career ==
Juan José Negri, alias "El Pichón" (English: The Pidgeon), started his career at Estudiantes La Plata, a club for which he played most of his career and scored 83 goals in total, winning the Copa Escobar and Copa República in the 1940s. Negri was transferred to Boca Juniors in 1947, and directly to rival River Plate in 1948, but without winning titles in the duo of giants. In Argentina, still played for Platense in 1951.

At the request of Argentine manager Jim López, based in Brazil, he was brought to Juventus da Mooca. With Jím Lopez's move to São Paulo FC, he also joined them, becoming champion of the 1953 Campeonato Paulista. He lost space at São Paulo FC in 1955, being transferred to Santos FC, where he was part of the squad that won the 1955 title.

Afterward, Negri moved to Chilean football, at San Luis de Quillota, at the time third placed in the table. However, due to an irregularity in the transfer, the dream turned into a nightmare and the club ended up relegated in the sporting court. He returned to Estudiantes for one last time and ended his career at Defensores de Cambaceres in 1959.

== International career ==
Negri played a single match for Argentina, on 28 March 1943, against Uruguay.

== Honours ==
Estudiantes

- Copa Adrián C. Escobar: 1944
- Copa Gral. P. Ramírez: 1945

São Paulo

- Campeonato Paulista: 1953

Santos

- Campeonato Paulista: 1955

== Death ==
Negri passed away in the city of La Plata, on 20 February 2003, aged 82.
