= Jorge Vásquez =

Jorge Vásquez can refer to:

- Jorge Vásquez (Chilean footballer) (1922–2017), Chilean footballer
- Jorge Vásquez (Peruvian footballer) (1937–2025), Peruvian footballer
- Jorge Vásquez (Salvadoran footballer) (born 1945), Salvadoran footballer
- Jorge Vásquez (baseball) (born 1978), Dominican baseball player

== See also ==
- Jorge Vázquez (disambiguation)
