= 1943 Copa Ramírez Final =

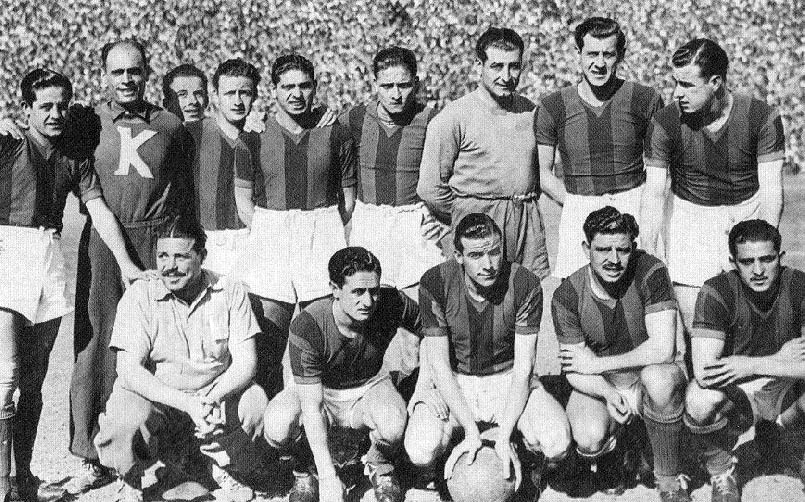
- A San Lorenzo team of 1943
- Event: 1943 Copa P. Ramírez
San Lorenzo	General Paz Juniors
8	3
- Date: 21 December 1943
- Venue: Estadio Chacarita Juniors, Buenos Aires
- Referee: Eduardo Forte

The 1943 Copa Ramírez Final (also named Campeonato de la República) was the final match to decide the winner of the Copa General Pedro Ramírez, the 2nd. edition of this Argentine national cup organised by the AFA. The final was contested by San Lorenzo and General Paz Juniors at the old Chacarita Juniors stadium on Humboldt and Padilla in Villa Crespo, Buenos Aires.

San Lorenzo won the first edition of this cup, beating General Paz Juniors 8–3.

== Qualified teams ==
Team	Previous final app.
San Lorenzo	(none)
General Paz Juniors	(none)

- **Bold** indicates winning years

== Overview ==
The cup was contested by 35 teams, contested by Primera División clubs and the best qualified teams from regional leagues. Teams were divided into four groups (by province), playing each other in a single round-robin tournament.

San Lorenzo's campaign included victories over River Plate (4–2), Estudiantes de La Plata (3–2), Puerto Comercial of Ingeniero White (4–1), and arch-rival Huracán (2–2 (a.e.t.) so a playoff had to be scheduled; San Lorenzo won 2–1).

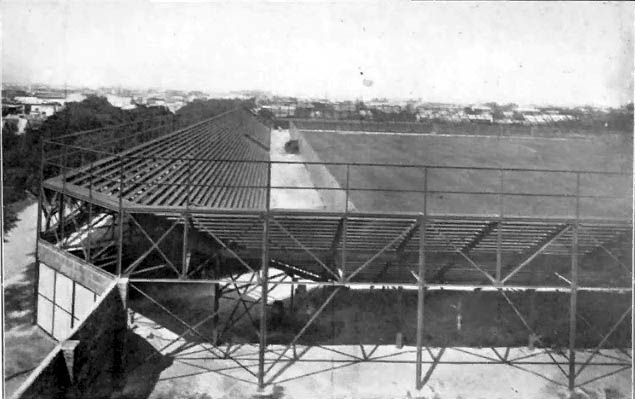
Chacarita Juniors, venue

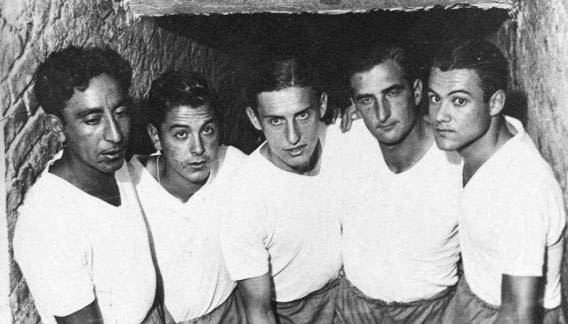
Forwards of Gral. Paz Juniors

On the other hand, General Paz Juniors defeated Sarmiento de Catamarca 6–0 (a.e.t.), Nacional Vélez Sársfield Pacífico of Mendoza (9–6, also a.e.t.: the match had ended 5–5 on 90' and 6–6 on 120' so a new extra time of 30' were played, where General Paz scored 3 goals else), Newell's Old Boys (3–2), and San Martín de Tucumán (5–4 a.e.t.). The team scored a total of 23 goals (5,75 p.g.) in only four matches played.

The final was scheduled to play at the former Chacarita Juniors venue in Villa Crespo, Buenos Aires (where San Lorenzo had already played their home games during all the competition), on 21 December.

== Road to the final ==
San Lorenzo		Round	General Paz Juniors	
Opponent	Result	Group stage	Opponent	Result
River Plate	4–2 (N) (Note: Played at Chacarita Juniors Stadium in Villa Crespo.)	Matchday 1	Sarmiento (Catamarca)	6–0 (a.e.t.) (H) (Note: Played at Belgrano Stadium in Córdoba.)
Estudiantes (LP)	3–2 (A) (Note: Played at Independiente Stadium.)	Matchday 2	Nacional VSP (Mza) (Note: Complete name: "Nacional Vélez Sársfield Pacífico", from Mendoza Province.)	9–6 (a.e.t.) (H)
Puerto Comercial	4–1 (H)	Quarter finals	Newell's Old Boys	3–2 (N) (Note: Played at La Bombonera.)
Huracán	2–2 (a.e.t.) (N); 2–1 (N)	Semifinals	San Martín (T)	5–4 (N) (Note: Played at Estadio Gasómetro.)

== Match details ==
1943 Copa P. Ramírez Final
21 December 1943

San Lorenzo	8–3	General Paz Juniors
Capozzuca 4' (o.g.); Borgnia 23'; Mariani 28', 67', 69'; Martino 30', 39'; Etchepare 90+2'	Report	Guerini 47', 89'; Lacasia 72'

Estadio de Chacarita Juniors, Buenos Aires
Attendance: ?
Referee: Eduardo Forte

**San Lorenzo**	**General Paz Juniors**

GK	(Argentina) Luis Heredia
DF	(Spain) Ángel Zubieta
DF	(Argentina) Eduardo Crespi
MF	(Argentina) Isidro D'Adario
MF	(Argentina) Juan Gosende
MF	(Argentina) Bartolomé Colombo
FW	(Argentina) Héctor Tablada
FW	(Argentina) Alfredo Borgnia
FW	(Argentina) Tomás Etchepare
FW	(Argentina) Rinaldo Martino
FW	(Argentina) Luis Mariani
Manager:
(Argentina) Diego García

GK	(Argentina) José Molinolo
DF	(Argentina) Rodolfo Rosales
DF	(Argentina) Ricardo Capozzuca
MF	(Argentina) Antonio Gil
MF	(Argentina) Pedro Moyano
MF	(Argentina) Rafael Belusci
FW	(Argentina) Carlos Lacasia
FW	(Argentina) Ricardo Zullani
FW	(Argentina) Alfredo Guerini
FW	(Argentina) Humberto Martínez
FW	(Argentina) Francisco García
Manager:
(Argentina) ?
