= Jorge Vázquez =

Jorge Vazquez may refer to:

- Jorge Vázquez (baseball), Mexican baseball player
- Jorge Vázquez (bishop), Argentine Roman Catholic prelate
- Jorge Vázquez (diplomat) (1943–2007), Argentine diplomat and politician
- Jorge Vázquez (footballer) (born 1969), Argentine footballer
- Jorge Javier Vázquez, Spanish TV presenter and writer
- Jorge Vázquez Viaña, Bolivian revolutionary, member of Che Guevara's guerrilla fighters

== See also ==
- Jorge Vásquez (disambiguation)
