= Luiz Borracha =

Brazilian footballer

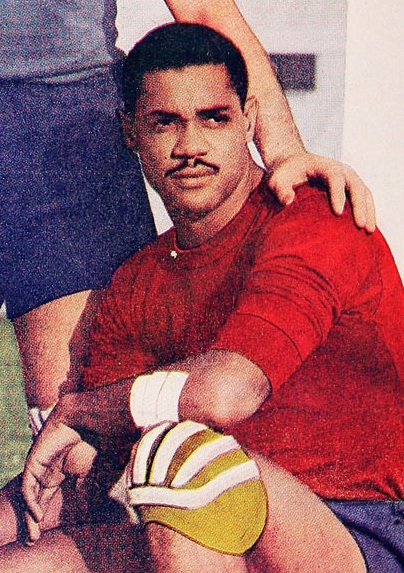

Personal information
- Full name: Luiz Gonzaga de Moura
- Date of birth: 1 November 1920
- Date of death: 20 April 1993 (aged 72)
- Position: Goalkeeper

International career
Years	Team	Apps	(Gls)
1946–1948	Brazil	4	(0)

Luiz Gonzaga de Moura , best known as Luiz Borracha (1 November 1920 – 20 April 1993) was a Brazilian footballer. He played in four matches for the Brazil national football team from 1946 to 1948. He was also part of Brazil's squad for the 1946 South American Championship.
