= Manuel Piñero (footballer) =

Chilean footballer (1920–1969)

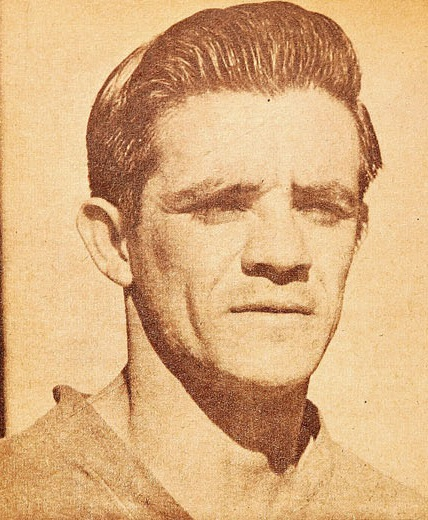

Personal information
- Full name: Manuel Alberto Piñero González
- Date of birth: 20 August 1920
- Date of death: 20 February 1969 (aged 48)
- Position: Defender

International career
Years	Team	Apps	(Gls)
1945	Chile	6	(1)

Manuel Piñero (20 August 1920 – 20 February 1969) was a Chilean footballer. He played in six matches for the Chile national football team in 1945. He was also part of Chile's squad for the 1945 South American Championship.
