= Héctor Ricardo =

Argentine footballer

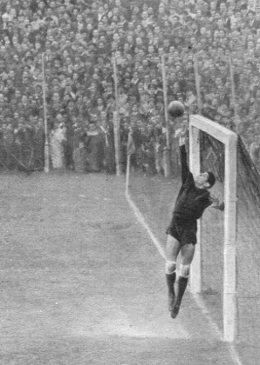

Personal information
- Date of birth: 10 February 1925
- Date of death: 6 September 1989 (aged 64)
- Position: Goalkeeper

International career
Years	Team	Apps	(Gls)
1945	Argentina	7	(0)

Héctor Ricardo (10 February 1925 – 6 September 1989) was an Argentine footballer. He played in seven matches for the Argentina national football team in 1945. He was also part of Argentina's squad for the 1945 South American Championship.
