= Domingo Pino =

Chilean footballer (1922-1986)

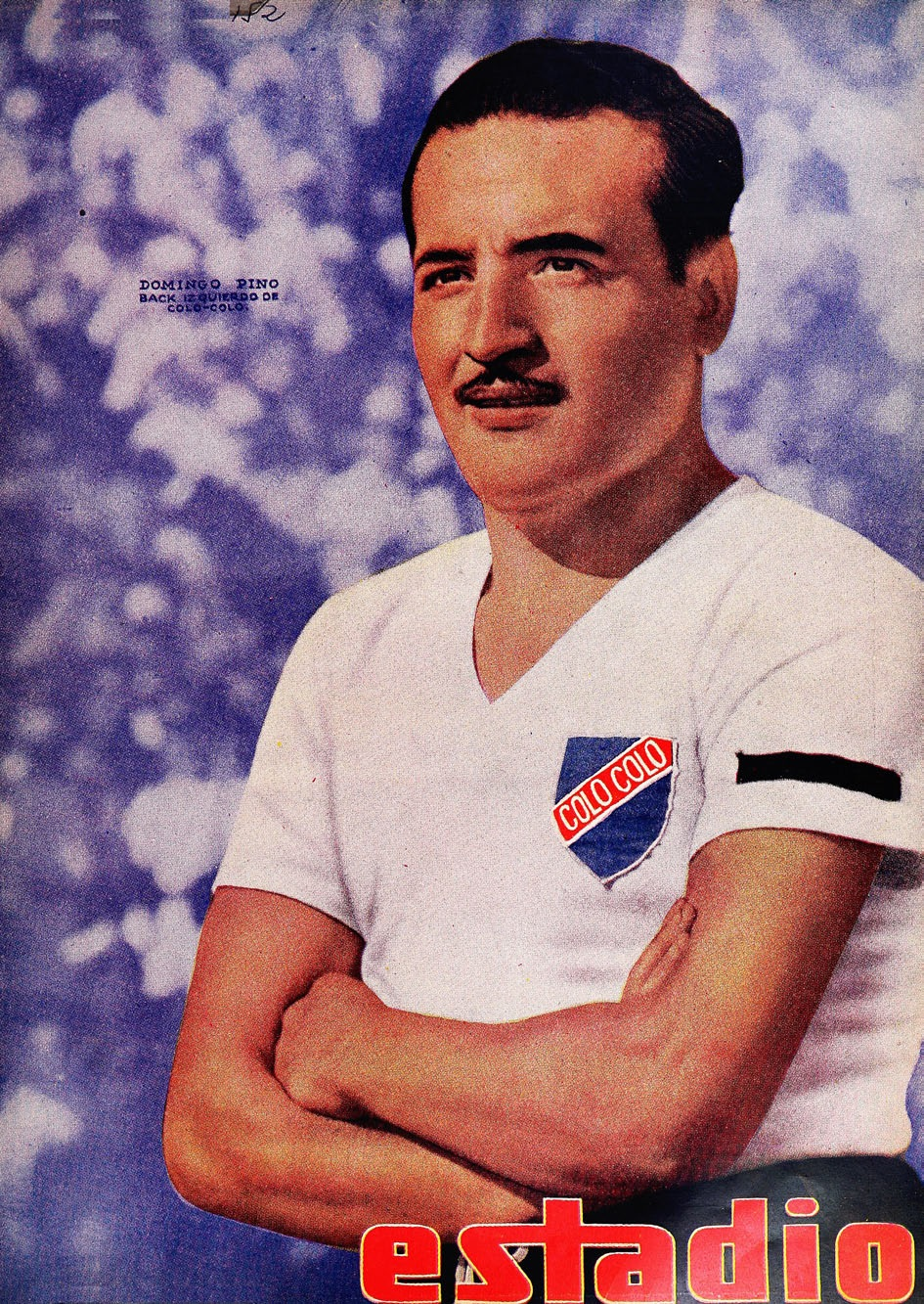

Personal information
- Full name: Domingo Segundo Pino Aravena
- Date of birth: 10 March 1922
- Place of birth: Cauquenes, Chile
- Date of death: 2 December 1986 (aged 64)
- Position: Defender

International career
| Years | Team | Apps | (Gls) |
| 1946 | Chile | 1 | (0) |

Domingo Segundo Pino Aravena (10 March 1922 – 2 December 1986) was a Chilean footballer. He played in one match for the Chile national football team in 1946. He was also part of Chile's squad for the 1946 South American Championship.
