= Oscar Sastre =

Argentine footballer

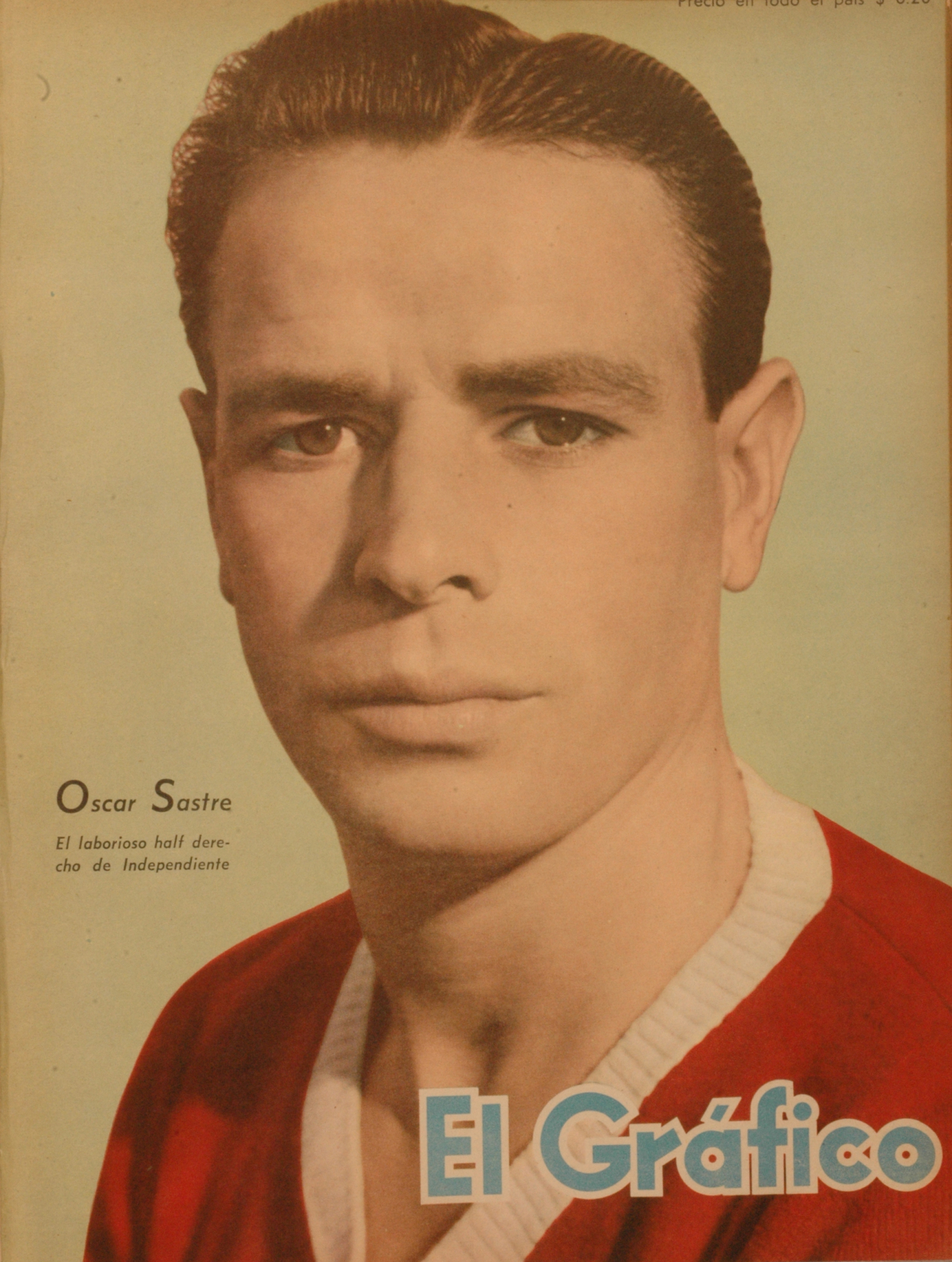

Personal information
- Date of birth: 25 December 1920
- Place of birth: Argentina
- Date of death: 2 August 2012 (aged 91)
- Position: Right half

Senior career*
Years	Team	Apps	(Gls)
1942–1949	Independiente	187	(5)
1950	Deportivo Cali		

International career
1947	Argentina		
- * Club domestic league appearances and goals

Oscar Sastre (25 December 1920 – 2 August 2012) was an Argentine international footballer.

== Career ==
Sastre was a key player for Club Atlético Independiente as the club won the 1948 Primera División Argentina. He joined Colombian side Deportivo Cali with former Independiente teammate Camilo Cerviño in 1950.

Sastre played for Argentina, winning the Copa América in 1947.

== Personal ==
Sastre's brother, Antonio, was also an Argentine international footballer.

== Honours ==
=== Club ===
Independiente

- Primera División Argentina: 1948

=== International ===
Argentina

- Copa América: 1945, 1946, 1947
