= Tomaso Luis Volpi =

Uruguayan footballer (born 1920)

Personal information
- Date of birth: 5 December 1920
- Place of birth: Artigas, Uruguay
- Position: Midfielder

Senior career*
Years	Team	Apps	(Gls)
1939–1941	Nacional		
1942	Montevideo Wanderers		
1944–1945	Montevideo Wanderers		
1946	Nacional		
1946–1947	Internazionale	4	(0)
1947–1954	Nacional		

International career
1940–1946	Uruguay	11	(2)
- * Club domestic league appearances and goals

Tomaso Luis Volpi (born 5 December 1920), also known as Tommaso Volpi, Tomás Volpi or Luis Volpi, is a Uruguayan retired professional footballer. He was born in Artigas. He made 11 appearances for the Uruguay national team.

== Honours ==
- Primera División (Uruguay) champion: 1939, 1940, 1941, 1946.
