= Guillermo Fuenzalida =

Chilean footballer (1918-1977)

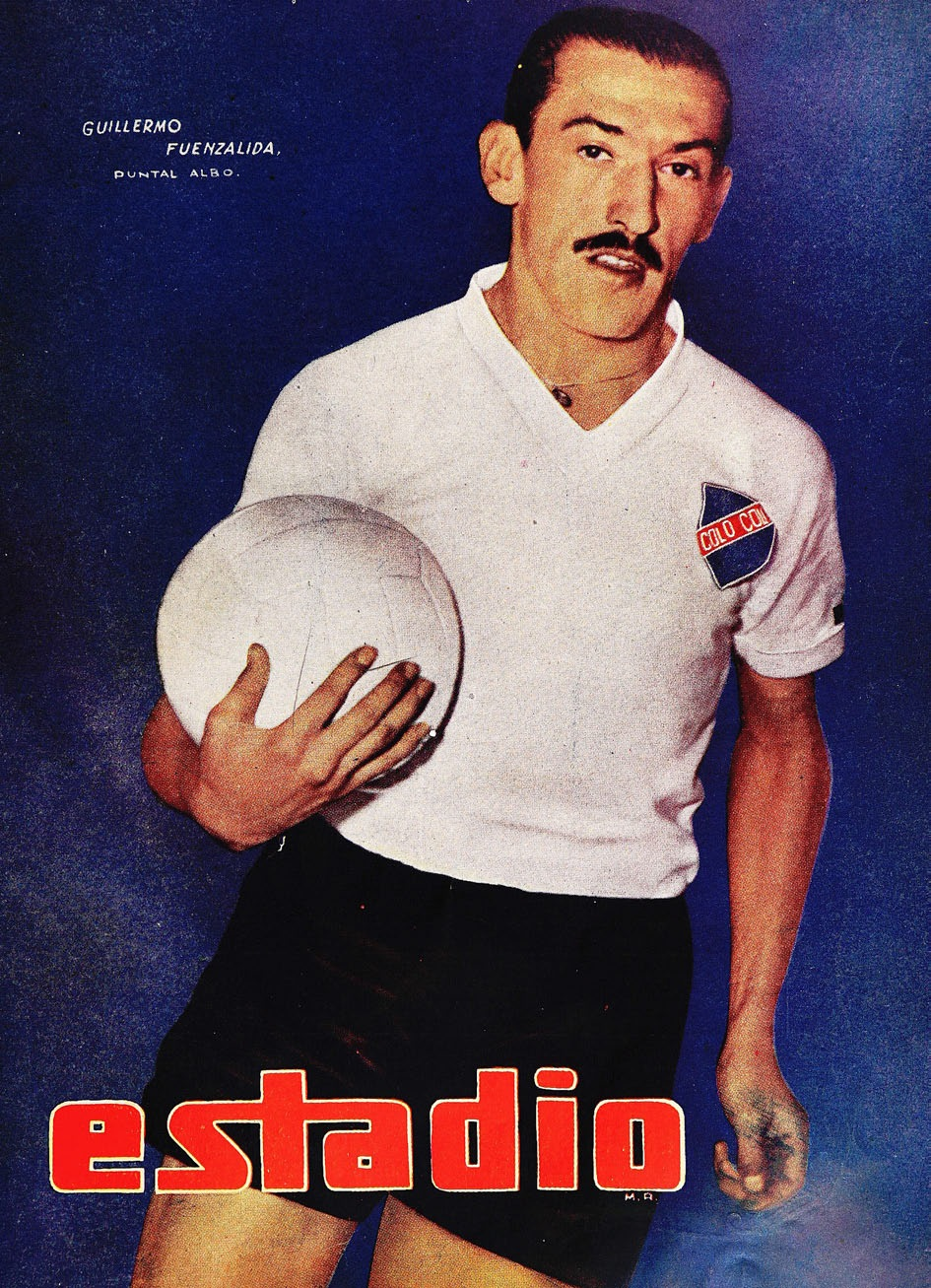

Personal information
- Full name: Guillermo Fuenzalida Fuenzalida
- Date of birth: 24 March 1918
- Date of death: 4 August 1977 (aged 59)
- Position: Defender

International career
Years	Team	Apps	(Gls)
1946	Chile	2	(0)

Guillermo Fuenzalida Fuenzalida (24 March 1918 – 4 August 1977) was a Chilean footballer. He played in two matches for the Chile national football team in 1946. He was also part of Chile's squad for the 1946 South American Championship.
