= Biguá =

Brazilian footballer (1921-1989)

Moacyr Cordeiro, simply known as Biguá (22 March 1921 – 9 January 1989), was a Brazilian footballer. He made six appearances for the Brazil national team in 1945.

Born in Irati, Paraná, the defensive midfielder started his career in 1939 at FC Água Verde. In 1941 he signed with Flamengo, in which he stayed until the end of his career in 1953. Bigua died on January 9, 1989, in Rio de Janeiro.
