= José Marante =

Argentine footballer

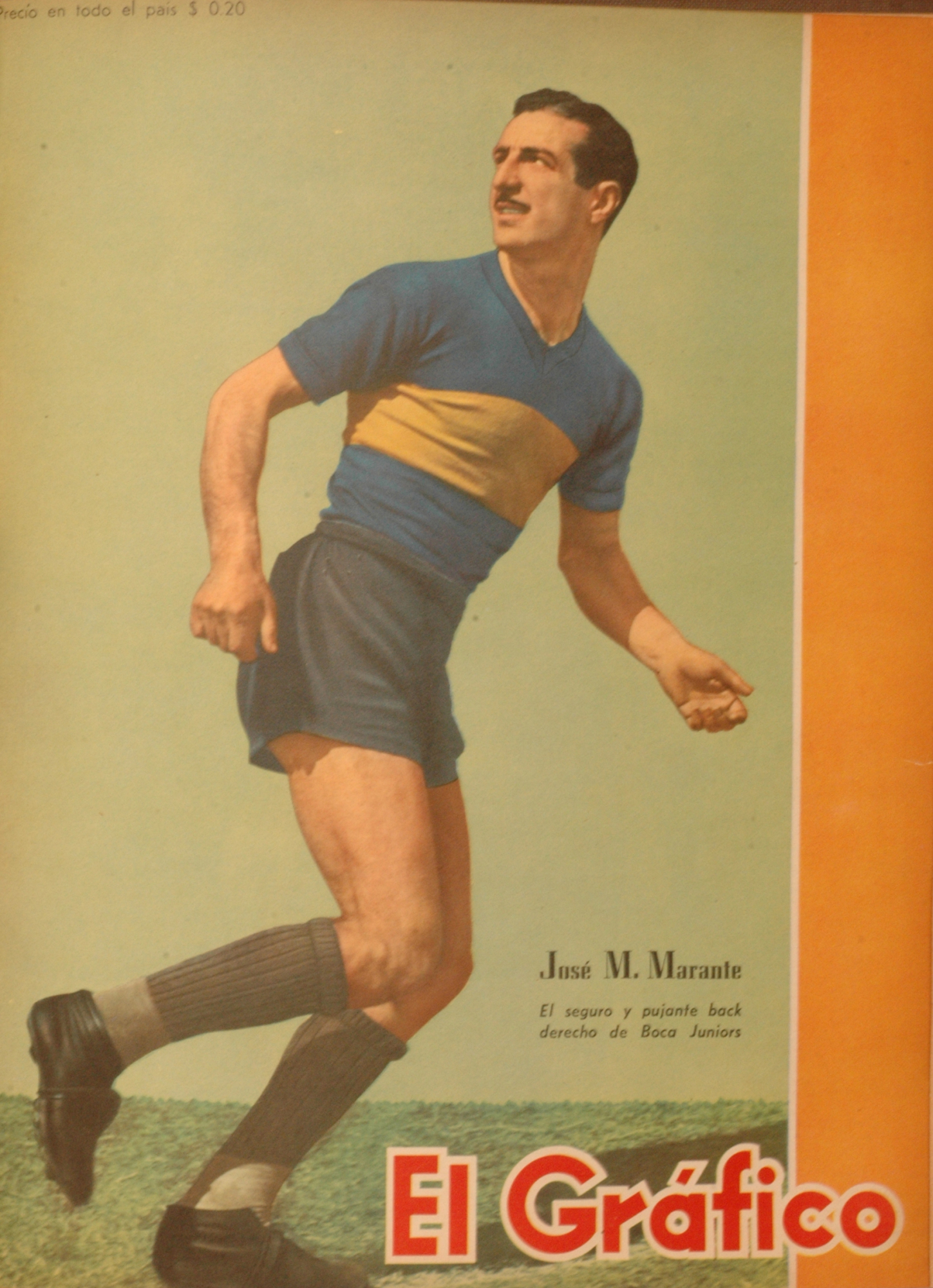

Personal information
- Date of birth: 27 February 1915
- Place of birth: Buenos Aires, Argentina
- Date of death: 27 August 1993 (aged 78)
- Position: Defender

International career
| Years | Team | Apps | (Gls) |
| 1945–1947 | Argentina | 9 | (0) |

José Marante (27 February 1915 – 27 August 1993) was an Argentine footballer. He played in nine matches for the Argentina national football team from 1945 to 1947. He was also part of Argentina's squad for the 1946 South American Championship.

== Honours ==
Boca Juniors

- Argentine Primera División: 1934, 1940, 1943, 1944
- Copa Ibarguren: 1944
- Copa de Competencia: 1946
- Copa de Confraternidad: 1945, 1946

Argentina

- Copa América: 1946, 1947
