= Manuel Pelegrina =

Argentine footballer

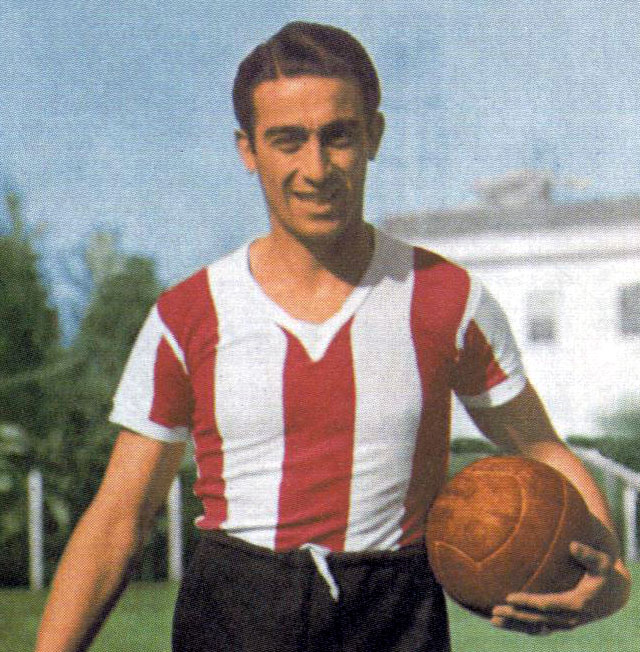

Personal information
- Full name: Manuel Gregorio Pelegrina
- Date of birth: November 29, 1919
- Place of birth: Córdoba, Argentina
- Date of death: November 23, 1992 (aged 72)
- Place of death: La Plata, Argentina
- Position: Left winger

Senior career*
Years	Team	Apps	(Gls)
1938–1952	Estudiantes LP	489	(234)
1953	Huracán	29	(10)
1954–1956	Estudiantes LP	(See above)	
1957–1961	Def. de Cambaceres	29	(18)

International career
1942–1947	Argentina	4	(2)
- * Club domestic league appearances and goals as of 15 October 2007

Manuel Gregorio Pelegrina (November 29, 1919 – November 23, 1992) was an Argentine football forward that played most of his career for Estudiantes de La Plata. He is not only the highest scoring player in the history of the club with 227 goals but also the most capped player, having attended 489 matches for Estudiantes. Pelegrina is regarded as one of the best left-wingers ever in the history of Argentine football.

Besides, Pelegrina is ranked 7th. among the all-time Argentine Primera División top scorers with 231 goals in 490 matches, including his goals for Huracán. He won two titles with Estudiantes, Copa A. Escobar and Copa Gral. P. Ramírez.

Pelegrina was also capped for the Argentina national team, with which he won a Copa América in 1945.

== Biography ==
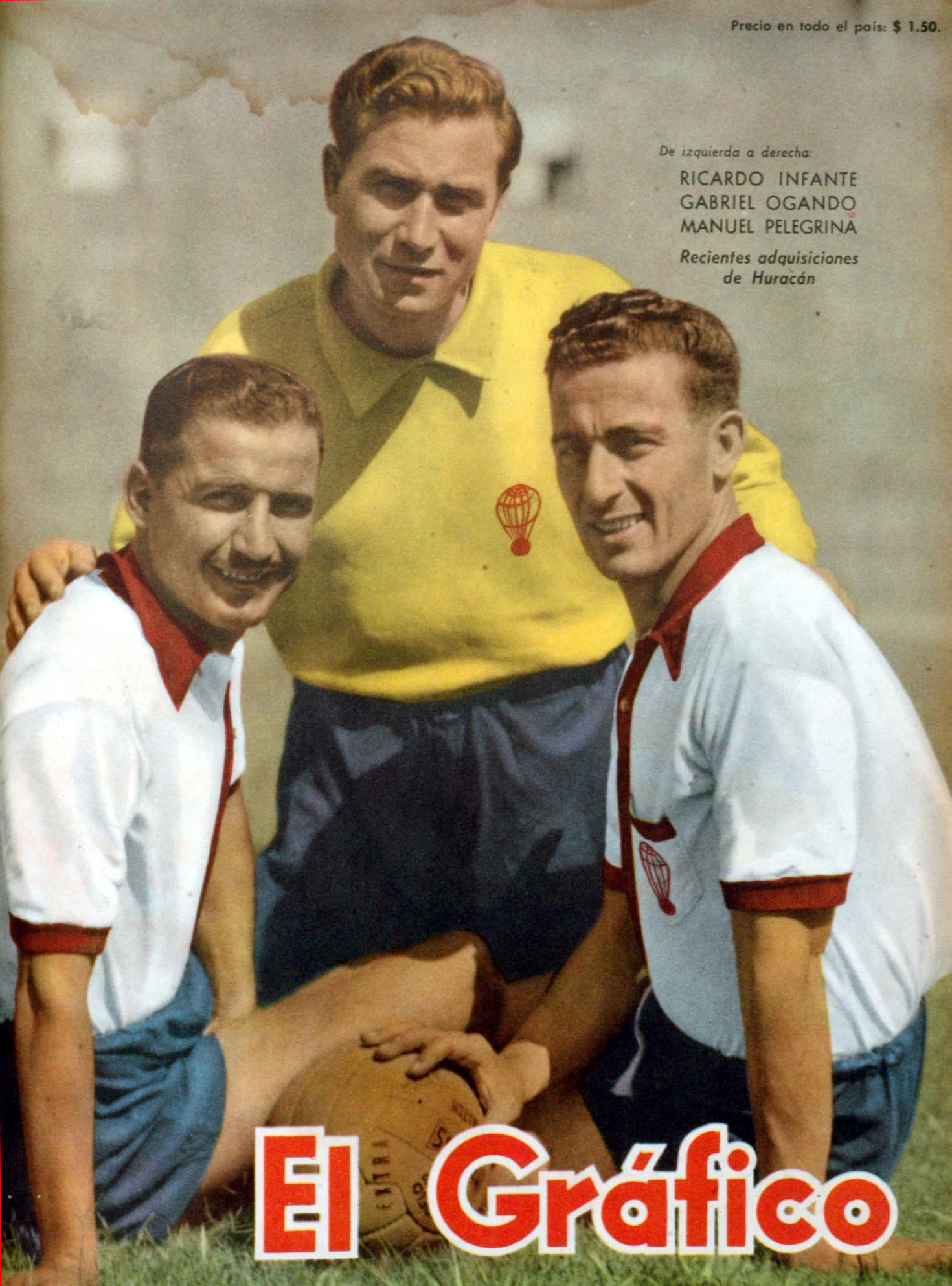
Pellegrina (right) with Ricardo Infante and goalkeeper Gabriel Ogando during his brief tenure on Huracán in 1953

Pelegrina was born in San Vicente, Córdoba. He made his youth career at local Club Lavalle, where he showed his skills as scorer. His good performances drew attention of Estudiantes de La Plata and Rosario Central, but he finally signed for Estudiantes.

Nicknamed Payo, Pelegrina played a total of 18 seasons with Estudiantes, forming a great tandem with Carlos Cirico, his greatest assistant. He played for the club until their relegation in 1953 when he left with Ricardo Infante to join Huracán. Pellegrina only played one season with Huracán before returning to Estudiantes.

During his time at Estudiantes Pelegrina made a number of appearances for Argentina, including games at the South American Championship 1945

Pelegrina eventually left Estudiantes in 1956 after scoring 234 goals in 489 games for the club. He scored 221 goals in 261 games for Estudiantes in the Primera División. He then played for Defensores de Cambaceres in the lower leagues of Argentine football between 1957 and 1961.

Apart from being the Estudiantes' all-time topscorer, Pelegrina also holds the record of most goals scored in the "La Plata derby" with 11 goals.

Pelegrina died of pneumonia in La Plata on November 23, 1992.

== Titles ==
Estudiantes L.P

- Copa Adrián C. Escobar (1): 1944
- Copa Gral. P. Ramírez (1): 1945

Argentina

- Copa América (1): 1945
