= Julio Musimessi =

Argentine footballer (1924–1996)

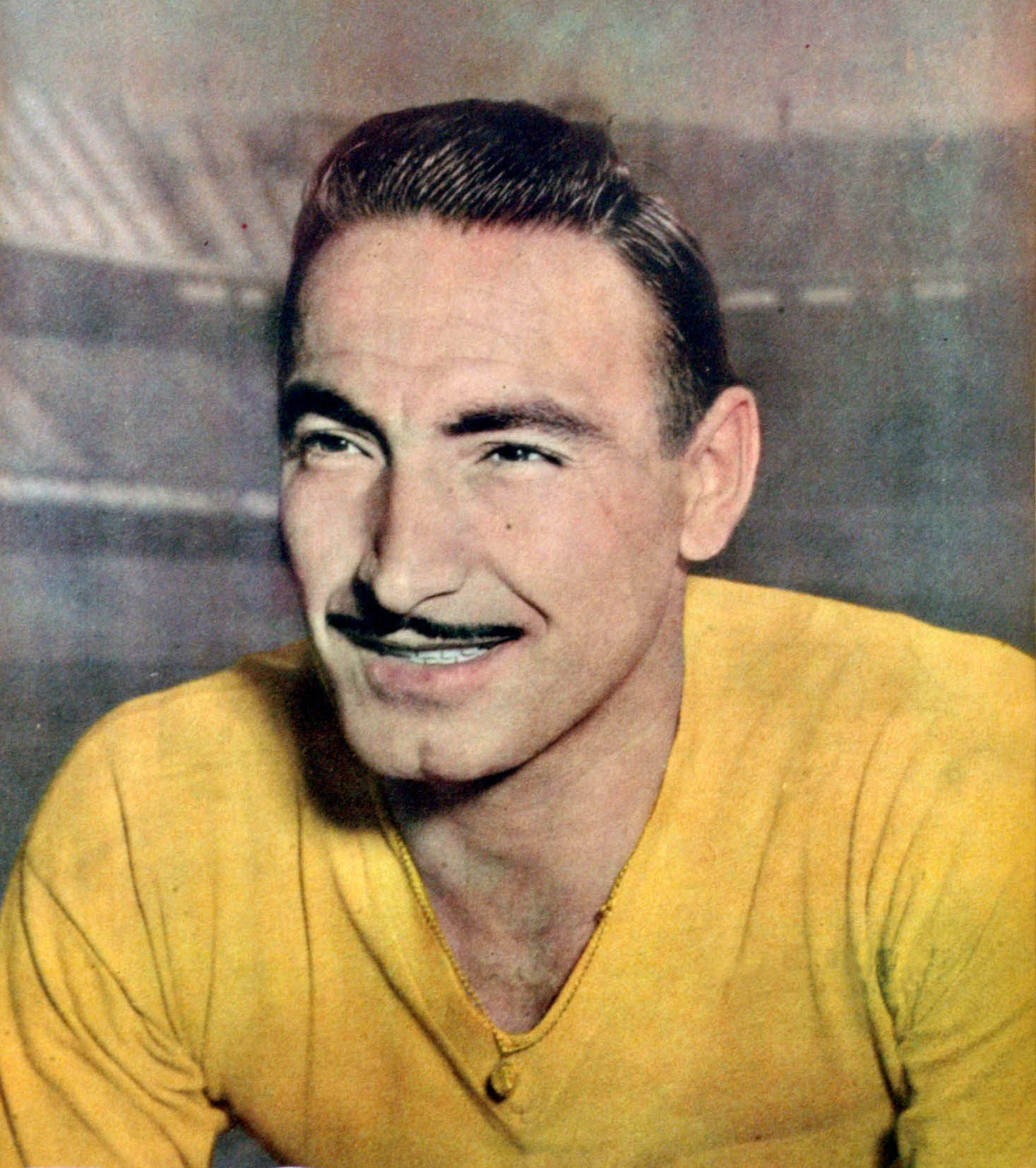
- Musimessi with Boca Juniors in 1953

Personal information
- Full name: Julio Elías Musimessi
- Date of birth: 9 July 1924
- Place of birth: Resistencia, Chaco, Argentina
- Date of death: 4 September 1996 (aged 72)
- Place of death: Morón, Argentina
- Position: Goalkeeper

Senior career*
Years	Team	Apps	(Gls)
1944–1953	Newell's Old Boys	183	(0)
1953–1959	Boca Juniors	155	(0)
1960–1961	Deportivo Morón		
1961–1962	Green Cross	57	(0)

International career
1953–1958	Argentina	14	(0)
- * Club domestic league appearances and goals

Julio Elías Musimessi (9 July 1924 in Resistencia, Chaco – 4 September 1996 in Morón) was an Argentine football goalkeeper who played for Newell's Old Boys, Boca Juniors and the Argentina national team.

== Career ==
Musimessi started his playing career in 1944 with Newell's Old Boys of Rosario, he played 183 times for the club before his transfer to Boca Juniors in 1953. In 1954 Boca won the league championship. He played 155 times for the club.

Following Boca Juniors, Musimessi played for Deportivo Morón in the Argentine second level.

At the end of his playing career he played for Green Cross of Chile.

At international level Musimessi played 14 times for Argentina. He was part of the squad that won the 1955 Copa América. He was also included in the 1956 Copa América and the 1958 FIFA World Cup squads.

Musimessi was known as "El Arquero cantor" (the singing goalkeeper) because of his performances on radio. After retiring from the game he established a bar in Morón.

== Titles ==
Season	Team	Title
1954	Boca Juniors	Primera División Argentina
1955	Argentina	Copa América
