= José Sepúlveda (footballer) =

Chilean footballer (1922-2009)

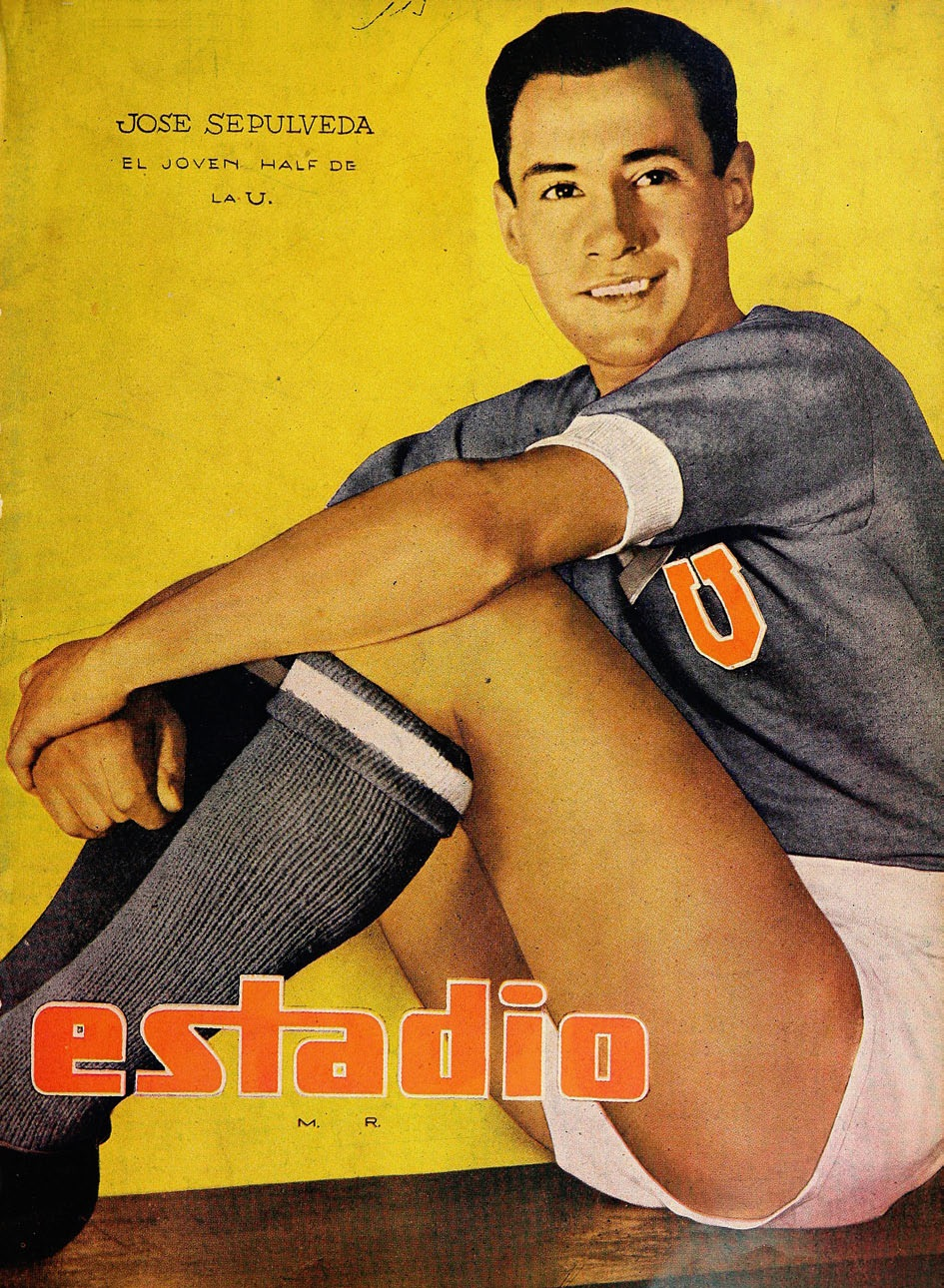
- Sepúlveda in 1946

Personal information
- Full name: José Ángel Sepúlveda Badilla
- Date of birth: 30 November 1922
- Date of death: 25 March 2009 (aged 86)
- Position: Midfielder

International career
Years	Team	Apps	(Gls)
1946–1947	Chile	10	(0)

José Ángel Sepúlveda Badilla (30 November 1922 – 25 March 2009) was a Chilean footballer. He played in ten matches for the Chile national football team in 1946 and 1947. He was also part of Chile's squad for the 1946 South American Championship.
