= Luis Prais =

Uruguayan footballer (1925-2005)

Personal information
- Full name: Luis Prais Bernardo
- Date of birth: 24 February 1925
- Date of death: 2 January 2005 (aged 79)
- Position: Defender

International career
Years	Team	Apps	(Gls)
1946	Uruguay	4	(0)

Luis Prais Bernardo (24 February 1925 – 2 January 2005) was a Uruguayan footballer. He played in four matches for the Uruguay national football team in 1946. He was also part of Uruguay's squad for the 1946 South American Championship.
