= José López (Chilean footballer) =

Chilean footballer (1922-2011)

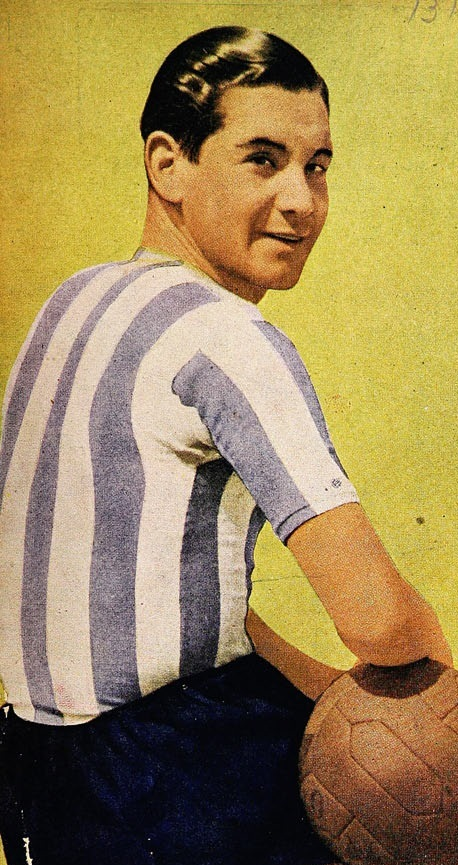

Personal information
- Full name: José Víctor López Latorre
- Date of birth: 15 December 1922
- Date of death: 24 April 2011 (aged 88)
- Position: Defender

International career
Years	Team	Apps	(Gls)
1946–1950	Chile	6	(0)

José Víctor López Latorre (15 December 1922 – 24 April 2011) was a Chilean footballer. He played in six matches for the Chile national football team from 1946 to 1950. He was also part of Chile's squad for the 1946 South American Championship.
