= Leonardo Ferrel =

Bolivian footballer (1923–2013)

Personal information
- Full name: Leonardo Ferrel Lobo
- Date of birth: 7 July 1923
- Place of birth: Punata, Cochabamba, Bolivia
- Date of death: 11 July 2013 (aged 90)
- Place of death: Cochabamba, Bolivia
- Height: 1.78 m (5 ft 10 in)
- Position: Midfielder

Senior career*
| Years | Team | Apps | (Gls) |
- The Strongest

International career
- Bolivia
- * Club domestic league appearances and goals

Leonardo Ferrel Lobo (7 July 1923 – 11 July 2013) was a Bolivian football midfielder who played for Bolivia in the 1950 FIFA World Cup. He also played for The Strongest.
