= Domingo Romo =

Chilean footballer (1917-1993)

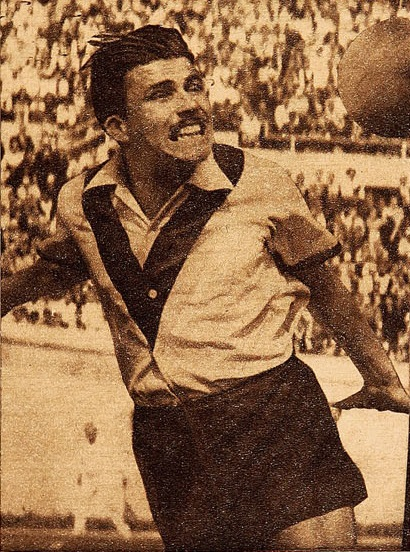

Personal information
- Full name: José Domingo Romo Miranda
- Date of birth: 17 April 1917
- Date of death: 18 May 1993 (aged 76)
- Position: Forward

International career
Years	Team	Apps	(Gls)
1946	Chile	2	(0)

José Domingo Romo Miranda (17 April 1917 – 18 May 1993) was a Chilean footballer. He played in two matches for the Chile national football team in 1946. He was also part of Chile's squad for the 1946 South American Championship.
