= Ivan (footballer, born 1919) =

Brazilian footballer

Personal information
- Full name: Ivan José Macachyba Dias
- Date of birth: 8 April 1919

International career
Years	Team	Apps	(Gls)
1946	Brazil	4	(0)

Ivan José Macachyba Dias (born 8 April 1919, date of death unknown), known as just Ivan, was a Brazilian footballer. He played in four matches for the Brazil national football team in 1946. He was also part of Brazil's squad for the 1946 South American Championship.
