= Aleixo Pereira =

Brazilian footballer (1924-1962)

Personal information
- Date of birth: 9 April 1924
- Date of death: 14 April 1962 (aged 38)
- Position: Midfielder

International career
Years	Team	Apps	(Gls)
1946	Brazil	3	(0)

Aleixo Pereira (9 April 1924 – 14 April 1962) was a Brazilian footballer. He played in three matches for the Brazil national football team in 1946. He was also part of Brazil's squad for the 1946 South American Championship.
