= Gabriel Ogando =

Argentine footballer

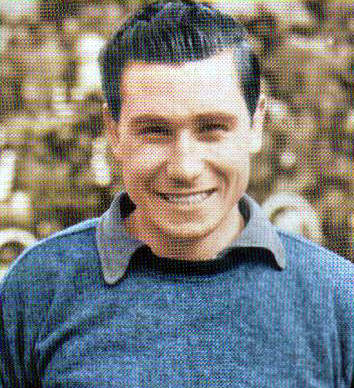

Personal information
- Date of birth: 22 August 1921
- Date of death: 16 July 2006 (aged 84)
- Position: Goalkeeper

International career
Years	Team	Apps	(Gls)
1945–1952	Argentina	5	(0)

Gabriel Ogando (22 August 1921 – 16 July 2006) was an Argentine footballer. He played in five matches for the Argentina national football team from 1945 to 1952. He was also part of Argentina's squad for the 1946 South American Championship.

== Honours ==
Estudiantes

- Copa Adrián C. Escobar: 1944
- Copa de la República: 1945

Argentina

- Copa América: 1946
