= Rodolfo Clavería =

Chilean footballer (1922-1999)

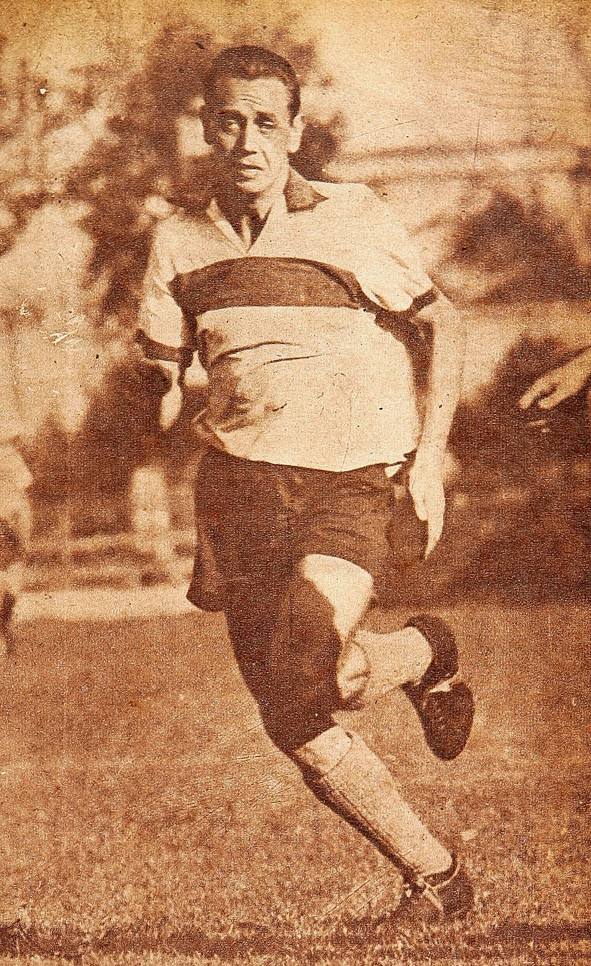

Personal information
- Full name: Rodolfo Clavería Junoy
- Date of birth: 20 October 1922
- Date of death: 24 March 1999 (aged 76)
- Position: Defender

International career
Years	Team	Apps	(Gls)
1946	Chile	2	(0)

Rodolfo Clavería Junoy (20 October 1922 – 24 March 1999) was a Chilean footballer. He played in two matches for the Chile national football team in 1946. He was also part of Chile's squad for the 1946 South American Championship.
