= Juan Carlos Fonda =

Argentine footballer

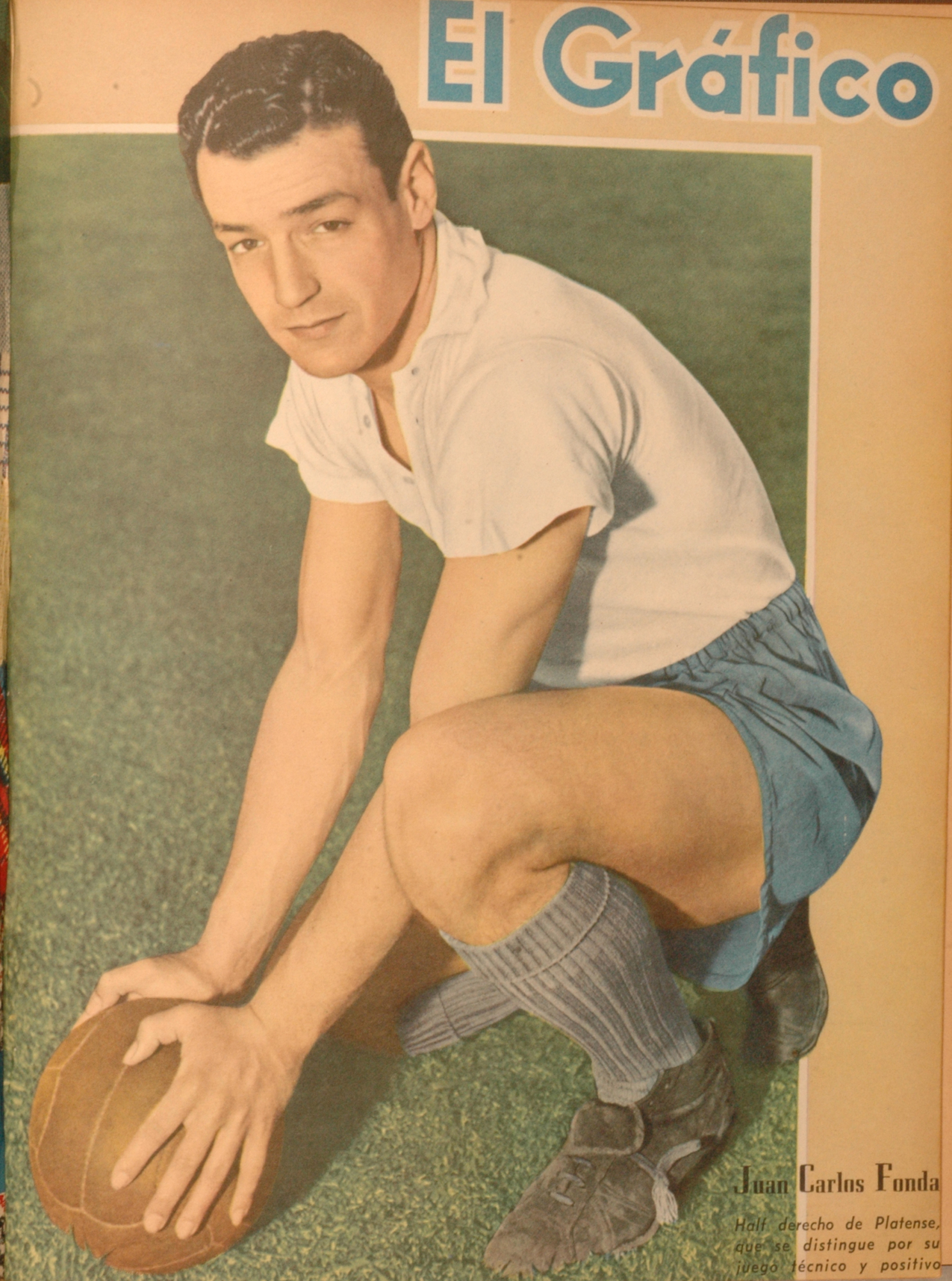

Personal information
- Full name: Juan Carlos Fonda
- Date of birth: 15 October 1919
- Date of death: 5 April 2004
- Position: Defender

International career
Years	Team	Apps	(Gls)
1945–1946	Argentina	10	(0)

Juan Carlos Fonda (15 October 1919 – 5 April 2004) was an Argentine footballer. He played in ten matches for the Argentina national football team in 1945 and 1946. He was also part of Argentina's squad for the 1946 South American Championship.
