= Carlos Atlagic =

Chilean footballer (1915–1987)

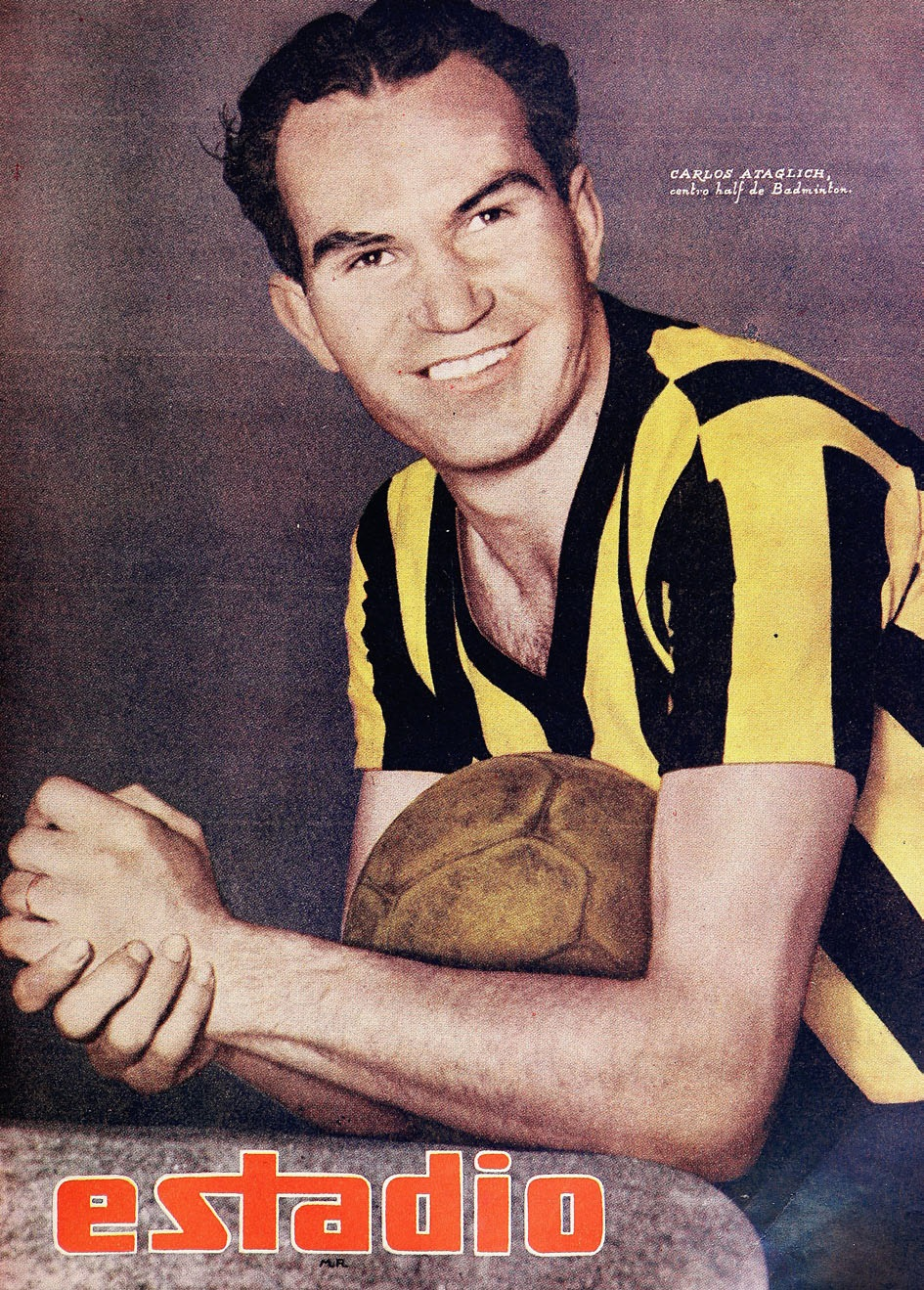

Personal information
- Full name: Carlos Vladimiro Atlagic Pinto
- Date of birth: 21 September 1915
- Place of birth: Iquique, Chile
- Date of death: 22 August 1987 (aged 71)
- Place of death: Los Ángeles, Chile
- Position: Midfielder

Youth career
- 1928: Los Canarios
- José Miguel Carrera
- Sportiva Italiana

Senior career*
Years	Team	Apps	(Gls)
- Santiago Badminton
- Colo-Colo
- Santiago Wanderers
1945–1946	Badminton		
1947–1950	Audax Italiano		

International career
1945	Chile	4	(0)
- * Club domestic league appearances and goals

Carlos Vladimiro Atlagic Pinto (21 September 1915 – 22 August 1987), frequently referred as Ataglich or Atlagich, was a Chilean footballer who played as a midfielder.

== Club career ==
As a child, Atlagic played for Los Canarios, the team of Colegio Don Bosco. In his early career, he played for José Miguel Carrera and Sportiva Italiana in his birthplace, Iquique. After doing military service, he began his professional career playing for Santiago Badminton, where he was well known by his strong shots. He used to win the competition to become the team captain, since it lay in shooting "with no bounce" and going as far as possible.

He also played for Colo-Colo, Santiago Wanderers and Audax Italiano, winning the 1948 Primera División de Chile. He frequently returned to Iquique to reinforce the city team, playing also versus Alianza Lima and Universitario from Peru.

== International career ==
Atlagic played in four matches for the Chile national team in the 1945 South American Championship. It was said that he was considered to be part of the Chile squad for the 1950 World Cup.

== Personal life ==
He was nicknamed Obelisco (Obelisk) by Argentine spectators in Buenos Aires.

== Honours ==
Audax Italiano

- Chilean Primera División: 1948
