= Jorge Peñaloza =

Chilean footballer (1922-1987)

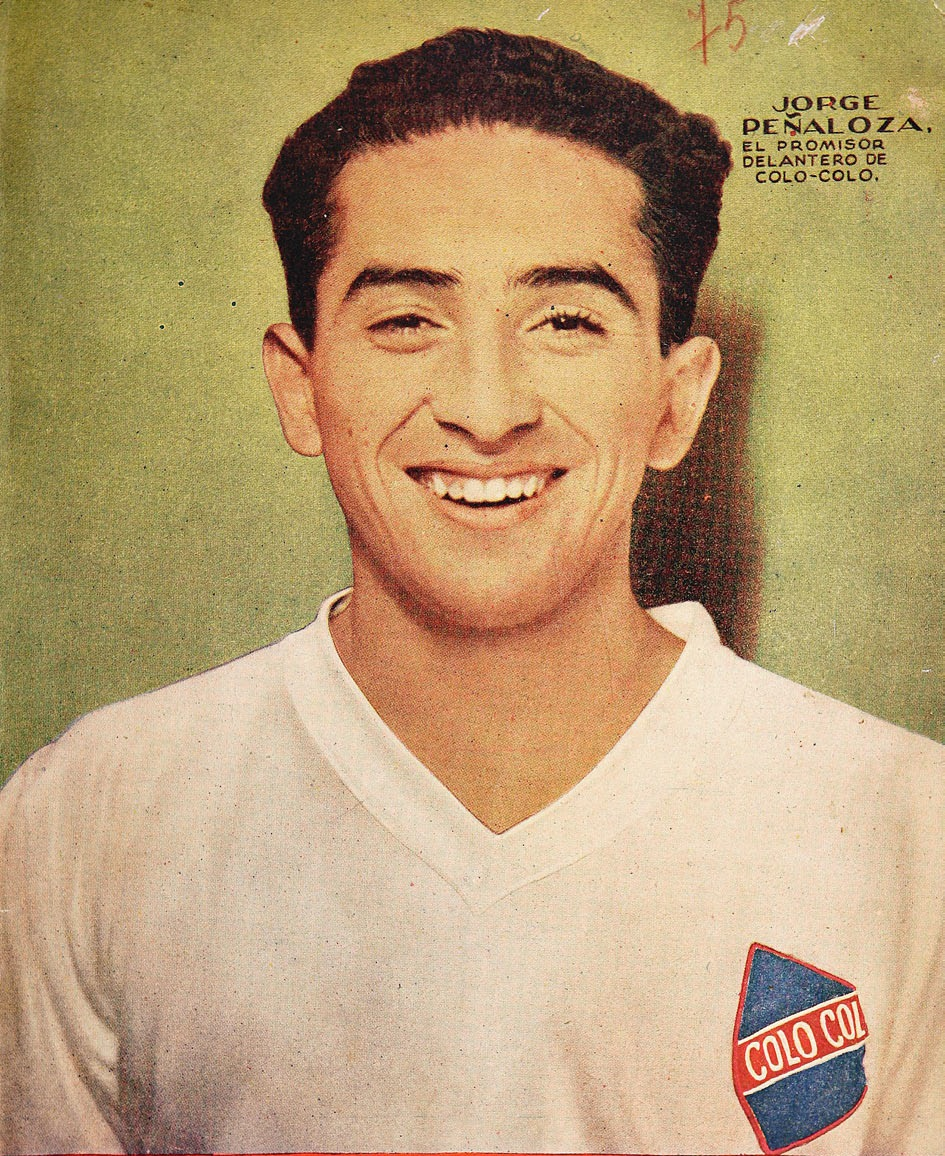

Personal information
- Full name: Jorge Peñaloza Huerta
- Date of birth: 21 February 1922
- Date of death: 31 January 1987 (aged 64)
- Position: Forward

International career
Years	Team	Apps	(Gls)
1946–1947	Chile	8	(1)

Jorge Peñaloza Huerta (21 February 1922 – 31 January 1987) was a Chilean footballer. He played in eight matches for the Chile national football team from 1946 to 1947. He was also part of Chile's squad for the 1946 South American Championship.
