= San Martín de Tucumán =

Argentine sports club

San Martín (Tucumán)
- Full name: Club Atlético San Martín
- Nicknames: El Santo (The Saint); Los Cirujas (The Homeless)
- Founded: November 2, 1909; 117 years ago
- Ground: Estadio La Ciudadela, San Miguel de Tucumán, Argentina
- Capacity: 27,250
- Chairman: Rubén Moisello
- Manager: Andrés Yllana
- League: Primera Nacional
- 2025: Primera Nacional Zone A, 6th of 18
- Website: clubatleticosanmartin.com.ar
Home colours	Away colours	Third colours

Club Atlético San Martín (mostly known as San Martín de Tucumán) is an Argentine sports club founded in 1909 and based in the city of San Miguel de Tucumán, Tucumán Province. The club is notable for its football team, which currently plays in the Argentine Primera B Nacional, the second division of the Argentine football league system.

Other sports practised at the club are field hockey, handball, martial arts, rugby union, swimming, tennis and volleyball.

== History ==
San Martin played every season in the Nacional championship between 1968 and 1985. El Santo has also played 3 seasons in the Argentine Primera División, in 1988–89, 1991–92 and in 2008–09.

The club's most notable victory was a 6–1 win over Boca Juniors in La Bombonera on November 20, 1988. After playing the 2008–09 season in Argentina's First Division, San Martín was relegated to Primera B Nacional. In 2011, after losing the Promoción, San Martín was relegated again to a lower division, the Torneo Argentino A.

== Current squad ==
As of 26 February 2025

Note: Flags indicate national team as defined under FIFA eligibility rules; some limited exceptions apply. Players may hold more than one non-FIFA nationality.

No.	Pos.	Nation	Player
—	GK	ARG	Darío Sand
—	GK	ARG	Nicolás Carrizo
—	GK	ARG	Juan Jaime
—	DF	ARG	Juan Orellana
—	DF	ARG	Mauro Osores
—	DF	ARG	Hernán Zuliani
—	DF	ARG	Tiago Peñalba
—	DF	ARG	Mateo Pérez
—	DF	PAR	Claudio Araujo
—	DF	ARG	Franco Quiroz
—	DF	ARG	Federico Murillo
—	DF	ARG	Axel Bordón
—	DF	ARG	Guillermo Rodríguez
—	MF	ARG	Gustavo Abregú
—	MF	ARG	Matías García

No.	Pos.	Nation	Player
—	MF	ARG	Agustín Prokop
—	MF	ARG	Jesús Soraire
—	MF	ARG	Ulises Vera
—	MF	ARG	Pablo Hernández
—	MF	ARG	Leonardo Monje
—	MF	ARG	Gabriel Hachen
—	MF	ARG	Juan Cuevas
—	FW	ARG	Juan Cruz Esquivel
—	FW	ARG	Nahuel Cainelli
—	FW	ARG	Gonzalo Rodríguez
—	FW	ARG	Martín Pino
—	FW	ARG	Nicolás Moreno
—	FW	ARG	Mauro Verón
—	FW	ARG	Lautaro Taboada

== Honours ==
=== National ===
==== League ====
- Primera B Nacional (1): 2007–08
- Torneo Federal A (1): 2016
- Torneo del Interior (2): 1986-87, 1987-88
- Torneo Argentino B (1): 2004-05

==== National cups ====
- Copa Gral. P. Ramírez (1): 1944

=== Regional ===
- Federación Tucumana de Fútbol (20): 1919, 1923, 1940, 1941, 1943, 1944, 1945, 1947, 1949, 1953, 1954, 1955, 1956, 1966, 1967, 1969, 1970, 1971, 1974, 1976
- Liga Tucumana de Fútbol (7): 1980, 1981, 1982, 1984, 1985, 1987, 2004
- Copa Competencia (7): 1921, 1922, 1936, 1940, 1947, 1948, 1964
- Copa de Honor (12): 1922, 1943, 1945, 1946, 1947, 1949, 1950, 1951, 1955, 1965, 1973, 1974
- Copa de Preparación (1): 1975
