= Ary (footballer) =

Brazilian footballer

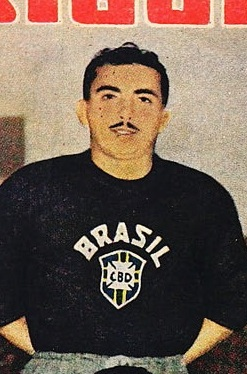
- Ary in 1946

Personal information
- Full name: Ary Nogueira Cezar
- Date of birth: 13 April 1919
- Position: Goalkeeper

Senior career*
Years	Team	Apps	(Gls)
1931–1941	Coritiba		
1942–1950	Botafogo-SP		
1950–1952	Millonarios		

International career
1945–1946	Brazil	8	(0)
- * Club domestic league appearances and goals

Ary Nogueira Cezar (born 13 April 1919, date of death unknown), known as just Ary, was a Brazilian footballer played as a goalkeeper. He made eight appearances for the Brazil national team from 1945 to 1946. He was also part of Brazil's squad for the 1946 South American Championship.
