= Jorge Vásquez (Chilean footballer) =

Chilean footballer (1922-2017)

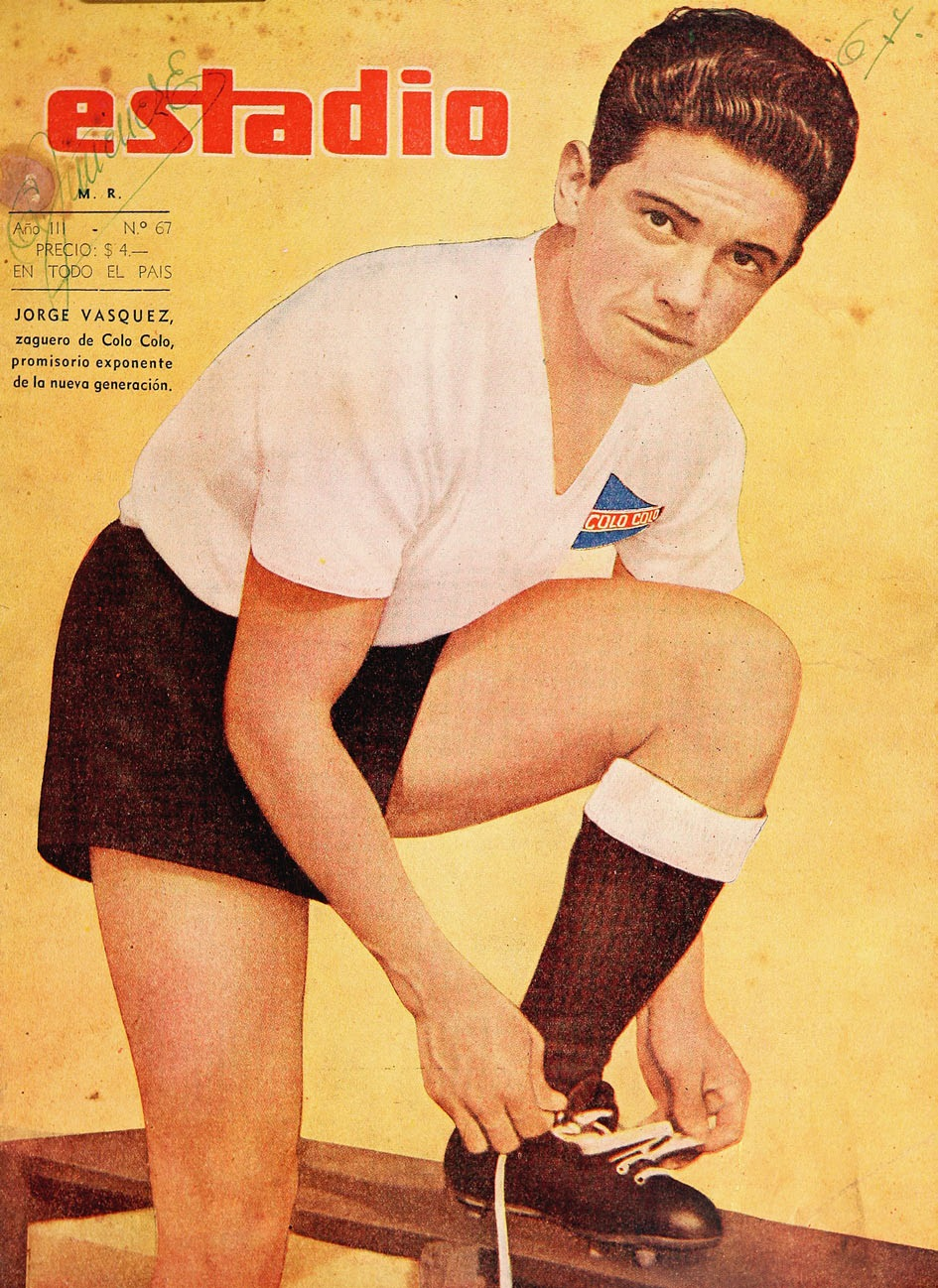

Personal information
- Full name: Jorge William Vásquez Muñoz
- Date of birth: 9 May 1922
- Place of birth: Valparaíso, Chile
- Date of death: 26 September 2017 (aged 95)
- Position: Defender

International career
Years	Team	Apps	(Gls)
1945	Chile	5	(0)

Jorge Vásquez (9 May 1922 – 26 September 2017) was a Chilean footballer. He played in five matches for the Chile national football team in 1945. He was also part of Chile's squad for the 1945 South American Championship.
