= Rodolfo de Zorzi =

Argentine footballer

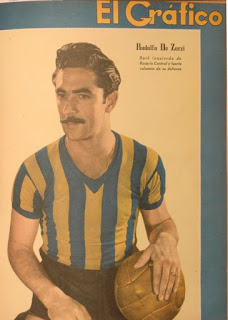

Personal information
- Full name: Rodolfo Justo De Zorzi
- Date of birth: 27 July 1921
- Place of birth: Rosario, Argentina
- Date of death: 12 January 1995 (aged 73)
- Position: Defender

International career
Years	Team	Apps	(Gls)
1945	Argentina	7	(0)

Rodolfo de Zorzi (27 July 1921 – 12 January 1995) was an Argentine footballer. He played in seven matches for the Argentina national football team in 1945. He was also part of Argentina's squad for the 1945 South American Championship.

== Honours ==
Rosario Central

- Primera B Metropolitana: 1942

Boca Juniors

- Copa Ibarguren: 1944
- Copa de Competencia: 1946
- Copa de Confraternidad: 1946

Argentina

- Copa América: 1945
