= Alberto Achá =

Bolivian footballer (1917-1965)

Personal information
- Full name: Alberto de Achá Figueroa
- Date of birth: 18 February 1917
- Place of birth: Cochabamba, Bolivia
- Date of death: 18 February 1965 (aged 48)
- Height: 1.73 m (5 ft 8 in)
- Position: Defender

Senior career*
Years	Team	Apps	(Gls)
1944–1951	The Strongest		

International career
1945-1950	Bolivia	24	(0)
- * Club domestic league appearances and goals

Alberto de Achá Figueroa (18 February 1917 – 18 February 1965) was a Bolivian football defender who played for Bolivia in the 1950 FIFA World Cup. He also played for The Strongest.
