= Mario Castro (footballer) =

Chilean footballer (1923-1983)

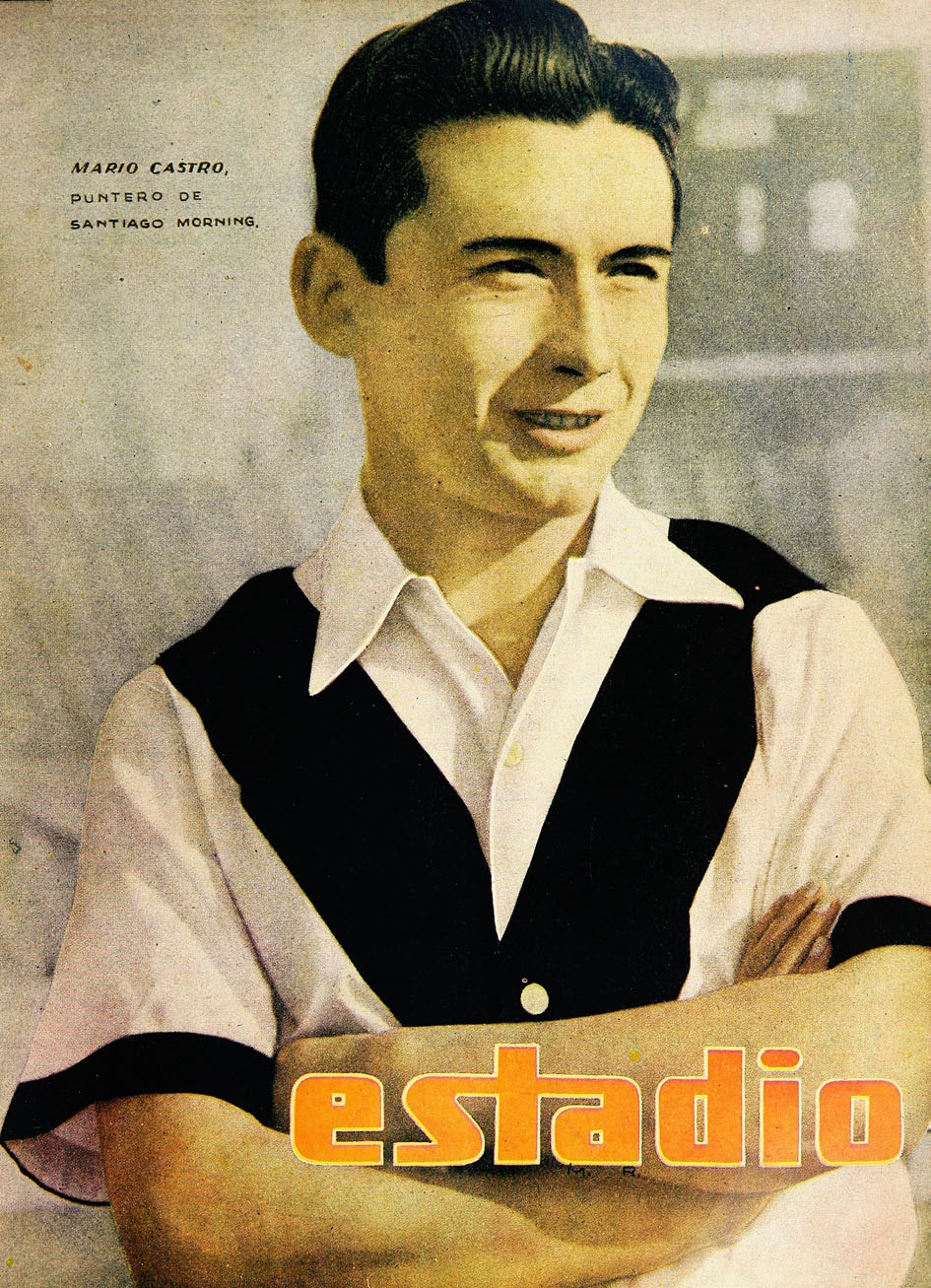
- Castro in 1945

Personal information
- Full name: Mario Eduardo Castro Pizarro
- Date of birth: 23 September 1923
- Date of death: 18 September 1983 (aged 59)
- Position: Midfielder

International career
Years	Team	Apps	(Gls)
1945–1953	Chile	12	(0)

Mario Eduardo Castro Pizarro (23 September 1923 – 18 September 1983) was a Chilean footballer. He played in twelve matches for the Chile national football team from 1945 to 1953. He was also part of Chile's squad for the 1945 South American Championship.
