= Víctor Klein (Chilean footballer) =

Chilean footballer (1917-1995)

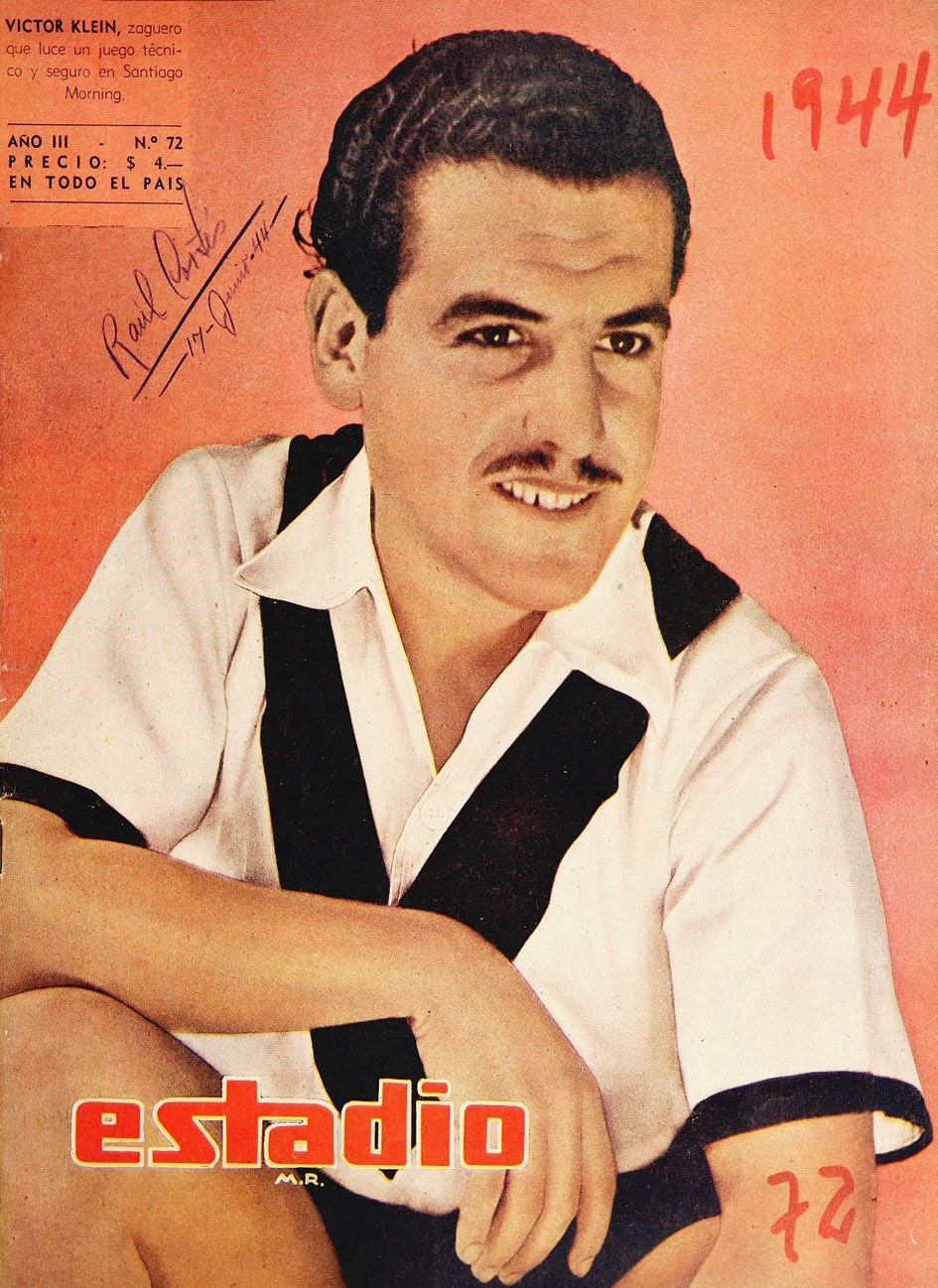

Personal information
- Date of birth: 2 October 1917
- Date of death: 13 August 1995 (aged 77)
- Position: Defender

International career
Years	Team	Apps	(Gls)
1945	Chile	1	(0)

Víctor Klein (2 October 1917 – 13 August 1995) was a Chilean footballer. He played in one match for the Chile national football team in 1945. He was also part of Chile's squad for the 1945 South American Championship.
