= Copa General Pedro Ramírez =

Argentine football cup competition

Campeonato de la República "Copa General Pedro Ramírez"
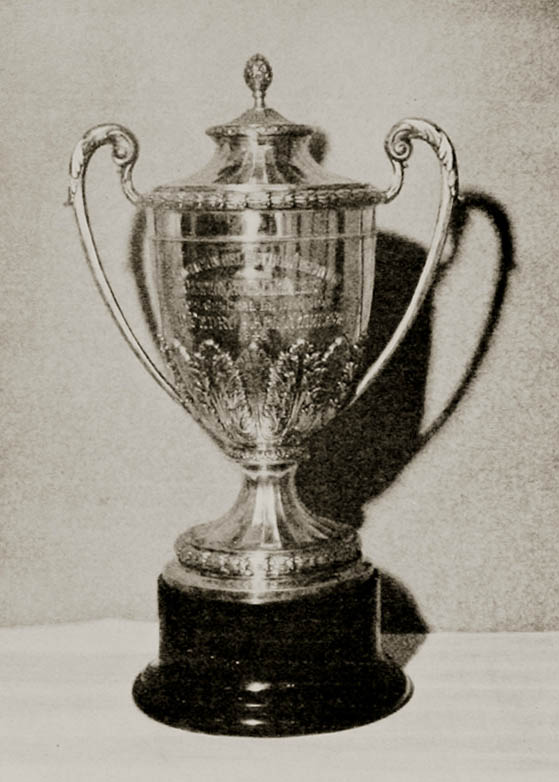
- The trophy given to champions, named to honor President Pedro P. Ramírez.
- Organiser(s): AFA
- Founded: 1943
- Abolished: 1945; 80 years ago
- Region: Argentina
- Teams: 42 (1945)
- Related competitions: Copa Argentina
- Last champions: Estudiantes (LP) (1945)

The Copa General Pedro Ramírez (officially named Campeonato de la República) was an Argentine official football cup competition organized by the Argentine Football Association. The trophy was named after being donated by then de facto President of Argentina, General Pedro Ramírez.

The first edition was contested by 35 teams from Primera División teams and others from regional leagues.

The format was a group stage where teams directly affiliated to the Association competed each other, while the best placed teams of regional leagues competed in other groups. All games were played at neutral venues.

From the quarterfinals, a total of eight teams from both groups (four directly affiliated and four from the regional leagues) faced in a knock-out tournament until a champion was crowned.

For the third and last edition of 1945, a record of 42 teams contested the tournament.

== Champions ==
=== Finals ===
Keys

- Final defined in a playoff match after both teams finished the group stage equaled on points.

Ed.	Year	Champion	Score	Runner-up	Venue	City
1	1943	San Lorenzo	8–3	General Paz Juniors	Chacarita Juniors	Buenos Aires
2	1944	San Martín (T)	3–1	Newell's Old Boys	Atlético Tucumán	Tucumán
3	1945	Estudiantes (LP)	4–4	Boca Juniors	San Lorenzo	Buenos Aires
3	1945	Estudiantes (LP)	1–0	Boca Juniors	San Lorenzo	Buenos Aires

=== Titles by team ===
Rank	Team	Titles	Years won
1	San Lorenzo	1	1943
1	San Martín (T)	1	1944
1	Estudiantes (LP)	1	1945

=== Topscorers ===
Year	Player	Goals	Club
1943	(Argentina) Humberto Martínez	10	General Paz Juniors (Cba)
1944	(Argentina) Raúl Micci	4	Newell's Old Boys
1945	(Argentina) Manuel Pelegrina	3	Estudiantes (LP)
1945	(Argentina) Gregorio Pin	3	Boca Juniors
