= Raúl Pini =

Uruguayan footballer (1923-1998)

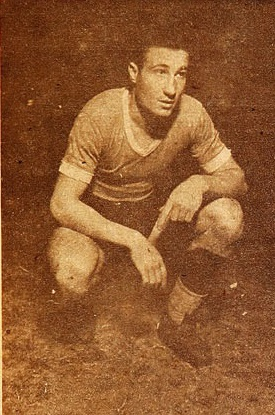

Personal information
- Full name: Raúl Hermenegildo Pini Giovio
- Date of birth: 2 June 1923
- Date of death: 2 October 1998 (aged 75)
- Position: Defender

International career
Years	Team	Apps	(Gls)
1944–1947	Uruguay	14	(0)

Raúl Hermenegildo Pini Giovio (2 June 1923 – 2 October 1998) was a Uruguayan footballer. He played in 14 matches for the Uruguay national football team from 1944 to 1947. He was also part of Uruguay's squad for the 1945 South American Championship.
