= Vicente Arraya =

Bolivian footballer (1922–1992)

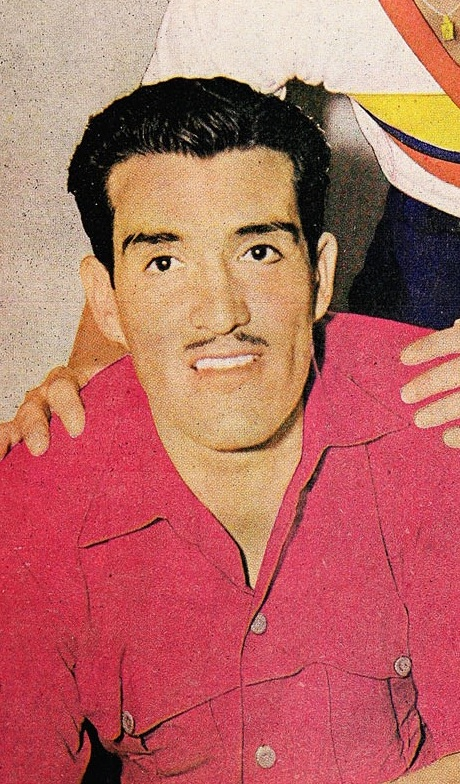

Personal information
- Full name: Vicente Arraya Castro
- Date of birth: 25 January 1922
- Place of birth: Oruro, Bolivia
- Date of death: 21 November 1992 (aged 70)
- Position: Goalkeeper

Senior career*
Years	Team	Apps	(Gls)
- Ferroviario La Paz
1944–1945	Atlanta	8	(0)

International career
1938-1950	Bolivia	26	(0)

Managerial career
- 1959: Bolivia
- * Club domestic league appearances and goals

Vicente Arraya Castro (25 January 1922 – 21 November 1992) was a Bolivian football goalkeeper who played for Bolivia in the 1950 FIFA World Cup. He also played for Ferroviario La Paz, and 8 matches for Club Atlético Atlanta of Argentina, in 1944–45. He was the first Bolivian player in the Argentina First Division. He managed the national team in 1959.
