= Ruperto Inchausti =

Bolivian footballer (1918-2013)

Personal information
- Full name: Ruperto Inchausti
- Date of birth: 27 March 1918
- Place of birth: Sucre, Bolivia
- Date of death: 5 December 2013 (aged 95)
- Place of death: Sucre, Bolivia
- Positions: Defender; midfielder

Senior career*
Years	Team	Apps	(Gls)
1945–1952	The Strongest		

International career
1945–1946	Bolivia		
- * Club domestic league appearances and goals

Ruperto Inchausti (27 March 1918 – 5 December 2013) was a Bolivian footballer who primarily played as a defender and midfielder. He died on 5 December 2013, aged 95, in his hometown of Sucre.

Season	Team
1951/52	The Strongest (Bolivia)
1950/51	The Strongest (Bolivia)
1949/50	The Strongest (Bolivia)
1948/49	The Strongest (Bolivia)
1947/48	The Strongest (Bolivia)
1946/47	The Strongest (Bolivia)
1945/46	The Strongest (Bolivia)
