= 1947 South American Championship squads =

List of footballers

These are the squads for the countries that played in the 1947 South American Championship. The participating countries were Argentina, Bolivia, Chile, Colombia, Ecuador, Paraguay, Peru and Uruguay. Brazil withdrew from the tournament. The teams plays in a single round-robin tournament, earning two points for a win, one point for a draw, and zero points for a loss.

== Argentina ==
Head Coach: (Argentina) Guillermo Stábile

No.	Pos.	Player	Date of birth (age)	Caps	Goals	Club
—	FW	Mario Boyé	30 July 1922 (aged 25)	7	2	(Argentine Football Association) Boca Juniors
—	FW	Francisco Campana	9 May 1925 (aged 22)	0	0	(Argentine Football Association) Chacarita Juniors
—	FW	Camilo Cerviño	21 March 1928 (aged 19)	0	0	(Argentine Football Association) Independiente
—	DF	Juan Carlos Colmán	15 December 1922 (aged 24)	0	0	(Argentine Football Association) Newell's Old Boys
—	GK	Julio Cozzi	14 July 1922 (aged 25)	0	0	(Argentine Football Association) Platense
—	GK	Obdulio Diano	27 October 1919 (aged 28)	0	0	(Argentine Football Association) Boca Juniors
—	FW	Alfredo Di Stéfano	4 July 1926 (aged 21)	0	0	(Argentine Football Association) River Plate
—	FW	Mario Fernández	26 January 1922 (aged 25)	0	0	(Argentine Football Association) Independiente
—	MF	Ernesto Gutiérrez	9 November 1927 (aged 20)	0	0	(Argentine Football Association) Racing Club
—	FW	Félix Loustau	25 December 1922 (aged 24)	14	5	(Argentine Football Association) River Plate
—	DF	José Marante	27 February 1915 (aged 32)	5	0	(Argentine Football Association) Boca Juniors
—	FW	Norberto Méndez	5 January 1923 (aged 24)	16	13	(Argentine Football Association) Huracán
—	FW	José Manuel Moreno	3 August 1916 (aged 31)	26	16	(Argentine Football Association) River Plate
—	DF	Nicolás Palma		4	0	(Argentine Football Association) Racing
—	MF	Ángel Perucca	19 August 1918 (aged 29)	21	2	(Argentine Football Association) Newell's Old Boys
—	MF	Natalio Pescia	1 January 1922 (aged 25)	0	0	(Argentine Football Association) Boca Juniors
—	FW	René Pontoni	18 May 1920 (aged 27)	15	14	(Argentine Football Association) San Lorenzo
—	MF	Néstor Rossi	10 May 1925 (aged 22)	0	0	(Argentine Football Association) River Plate
—	MF	Oscar Sastre	25 December 1920 (aged 26)	2	0	(Argentine Football Association) Independiente
—	DF	Juan Carlos Sobrero		10	0	(Argentine Football Association) Newell's Old Boys
—	FW	Ezra Sued	7 June 1923 (aged 24)	5	2	(Argentine Football Association) Racing Club
—	MF	Norberto Yácono	8 January 1919 (aged 28)	5	0	(Argentine Football Association) River Plate

== Bolivia ==
Head Coach: (Bolivia) Diógenes Lara

No.	Pos.	Player	Date of birth (age)	Caps	Goals	Club
—	DF	Alberto Achá	3 April 1920 (aged 27)	11	0	(Bolivian Football Federation) The Strongest
—	MF	Duberty Aráoz	21 December 1920 (aged 26)	0	0	(Bolivian Football Federation) Club Litoral
—	GK	Vicente Arraya	25 January 1922 (aged 25)	11	0	(Bolivian Football Federation) Club Ferroviario
—	DF	José Bustamante	5 March 1921 (aged 26)	4	0	(Bolivian Football Federation) Club Litoral
—	MF	Exequiel Calderón		11	0	(Bolivian Football Federation) Club Litoral
—	MF	Leonardo Ferrel	7 July 1923 (aged 24)	2	0	(Bolivian Football Federation) The Strongest
—	FW	Zenón González	23 June 1919 (aged 28)	9	2	(Bolivian Football Federation) Club Ferroviario
—	MF	Juan Guerra	13 April 1927 (aged 20)	0	0	(Bolivian Football Federation) Club Ferroviario
—	FW	Benigno Gutiérrez	1 September 1925 (aged 22)	0	0	(Bolivian Football Federation) Club Litoral
—	GK	Eduardo Gutiérrez	17 January 1925 (aged 22)	0	0	(Bolivian Football Federation) CD Ingaví
—	MF	Rodolfo Maida		1	0	(Bolivian Football Federation) New Players Cochabamba
—	MF	Benjamin Maldonado	4 January 1928 (aged 19)	0	0	(Bolivian Football Federation) Club San José
—	FW	Severo Orgaz		11	1	(Bolivian Football Federation) Club Litoral
—	FW	Armando Tapia	22 January 1922 (aged 25)	6	0	(Bolivian Football Federation) Club Ferroviario
—	FW	Arturo Tardío		0	0	(Bolivian Football Federation) Club Aurora
—	FW	Víctor Ugarte	5 May 1926 (aged 21)	0	0	(Bolivian Football Federation) Club Bolívar
—	MF	Raúl Vargas		4	0	(Bolivian Football Federation) Club Ferroviario
—	FW	Serapio Vega	23 March 1919 (aged 28)	3	0	(Bolivian Football Federation) The Strongest

== Chile ==
Head Coach: (Chile) Luis Tirado

No.	Pos.	Player	Date of birth (age)	Caps	Goals	Club
—	MF	Juan Manuel Acuña	16 October 1921 (aged 26)	0	0	(Football Federation of Chile) Audax Italiano
—	DF	Manuel Álvarez	23 May 1928 (aged 19)	0	0	(Football Federation of Chile) Universidad Católica
—	FW	Jorge Araya	21 September 1924 (aged 23)	4	3	(Football Federation of Chile) Green Cross
—	DF	Mario Baeza	28 April 1916 (aged 31)	2	0	(Football Federation of Chile) Universidad de Chile
—	MF	Miguel Busquets	15 October 1920 (aged 27)	5	0	(Football Federation of Chile) Universidad de Chile
—	MF	Fernando Campos	15 October 1923 (aged 24)	0	0	(Football Federation of Chile) Santiago Wanderers
—	FW	Raimundo Infante	2 February 1928 (aged 19)	0	0	(Football Federation of Chile) Universidad Católica
—	GK	Sergio Livingstone	26 March 1920 (aged 27)	14	0	(Football Federation of Chile) Universidad Católica
—	FW	Pedro Hugo López	25 October 1927 (aged 20)	0	0	(Football Federation of Chile) Colo Colo
—	DF	Manuel Machuca	6 June 1924 (aged 23)	0	0	(Football Federation of Chile) Colo Colo
—	DF	Juan Negri	5 January 1925 (aged 22)	0	0	(Football Federation of Chile) Universidad de Chile
—	FW	Jorge Peñaloza	21 February 1922 (aged 25)	2	0	(Football Federation of Chile) Colo Colo
—	FW	Andrés Prieto	19 December 1928 (aged 18)	0	0	(Football Federation of Chile) Universidad Católica
—	FW	Fernando Riera	27 June 1920 (aged 27)	4	0	(Football Federation of Chile) Universidad Católica
—	MF	Osvaldo Sáez	29 December 1920 (aged 26)	2	0	(Football Federation of Chile) Santiago Wanderers
—	MF	José Sepúlveda	30 November 1922 (aged 25)	4	0	(Football Federation of Chile) Universidad de Chile
—	DF	Francisco Urroz	14 December 1920 (aged 26)	0	0	(Football Federation of Chile) Colo Colo
—	FW	Carlos Varela	2 January 1918 (aged 29)	0	0	(Football Federation of Chile) Audax Italiano
—	MF	Fred Thomas Wood	21 December 1917 (aged 29)	0	0	(Football Federation of Chile) Santiago Morning

== Colombia ==
Head Coach: (Argentina) (Venezuela) Lino Taioli

No.	Pos.	Player	Date of birth (age)	Caps	Goals	Club
—	GK	Andrés Acosta		6	0	(Colombian Football Federation) Junior
—	FW	Carlos Arango	31 January 1928 (aged 19)	0	0	(Colombian Football Federation) Deportes Caldas
—	FW	Octavio Carrillo		0	0	(Colombian Football Federation) Junior
—	MF	Antonio de la Hoz	1920 (aged 27)	6	0	(Colombian Football Federation) Sporting de Barranquilla
—	MF	Luis Estupiñán		0	0	(Colombian Football Federation) América de Cali
—	FW	Saulo Flores		0	0	(Colombian Football Federation) América de Cali
—	DF	Jaime Gamboa		0	0	(Colombian Football Federation) América de Cali
—	FW	Rigoberto García		0	0	(Colombian Football Federation) Junior
—	FW	Luis González Rubio		6	2	(Colombian Football Federation) Junior
—	FW	Rafael Granados		4	0	(Colombian Football Federation) Junior
—	MF	Ricardo Granados		0	0	(Colombian Football Federation) Millonarios
—	DF	Salvador Londoño		0	0	(Colombian Football Federation) América de Cali
—	MF	Edgar Mallarino	25 January 1924 (aged 23)	2	0	(Colombian Football Federation) América de Cali
—	DF	Gabriel Mejía		6	0	(Colombian Football Federation) Junior
—	FW	Roberto Meléndez	31 March 1912 (aged 35)	2	0	(Colombian Football Federation) Junior
—	FW	Apolinar Pérez		0	0	(Colombian Football Federation) Junior
—	DF	Humberto Picalúa		6	0	(Colombian Football Federation) Junior
—	MF	Juan Quintero		6	0	(Colombian Football Federation) Junior
—	FW	Octavio Ruiz		0	0	(Colombian Football Federation) Junior
—	GK	Efraín Sánchez	26 February 1926 (aged 21)	0	0	(Argentine Football Association) San Lorenzo
—	MF	Rafael Serna		0	0	(Colombian Football Federation) Atlético Nacional
—	FW	Roberto Soto		0	0	(Colombian Football Federation) Atlético Nacional
—	FW	Efraín Vásquez		0	0	(Colombian Football Federation) América de Cali
—	MF	Carlos Vivares		0	0	(Colombian Football Federation) Atlético Nacional

== Ecuador ==
Head Coach: (Ecuador) Ramón Unamuno

No.	Pos.	Player	Date of birth (age)	Caps	Goals	Club
—	FW	Víctor Aguayo		6	4	(Ecuadorian Football Federation) Aucas
—	FW	Enrique Álvarez	18 October 1920 (aged 27)	12	1	(Colombian Football Federation) Santa Fe
—	FW	Enrique Cantos	18 January 1925 (aged 22)	0	0	(Ecuadorian Football Federation) Barcelona SC
—	GK	Luis Alfredo Carrillo	3 November 1920 (aged 27)	0	0	(Ecuadorian Football Federation) Macará
—	DF	Víctor Cevallos		0	0	(Ecuadorian Football Federation) Aucas
—	FW	César Garnica	22 November 1919 (aged 28)	0	0	(Ecuadorian Football Federation) Aucas
—	FW	Guillermo Gavilánez		3	0	(Ecuadorian Football Federation) Aucas
—	DF	Jorge Henríquez	2 September 1921 (aged 26)	6	0	(Football Federation of Chile) Audax Italiano
—	FW	José María Jiménez	22 July 1921 (aged 26)	12	3	(Ecuadorian Football Federation) Emelec
—	MF	Heráclides Marín		0	0	(Ecuadorian Football Federation) Barcelona SC
—	GK	Napoleón Medina	26 November 1919 (aged 28)	12	0	(Ecuadorian Football Federation) Patria
—	FW	José Luis Mendoza		7	1	(Ecuadorian Football Federation) Emelec
—	MF	Luis Antonio Mendoza	25 August 1914 (aged 33)	15	3	(Ecuadorian Football Federation) Emelec
—	MF	Alfredo Molina	13 October 1920 (aged 27)	0	0	(Ecuadorian Football Federation)
—	MF	Eduardo Ortiz	9 April 1929 (aged 18)	0	0	(Ecuadorian Football Federation) Emelec
—	FW	Gonzalo Pozo	27 May 1925 (aged 22)	0	0	(Ecuadorian Football Federation) Aucas
—	MF	Ricardo Riveros		0	0	(Ecuadorian Football Federation) Emelec
—	DF	Carlos Sánchez	15 July 1922 (aged 25)	0	0	(Ecuadorian Football Federation) Barcelona SC
—	MF	Celso Torres		5	0	(Ecuadorian Football Federation) LDU Quito
—	FW	José Vargas	19 December 1924 (aged 22)	0	0	(Ecuadorian Football Federation) Barcelona SC
—	FW	Federico Zenck		0	0	(Ecuadorian Football Federation) Panamá
—	DF	Félix Leyton Zurita	22 November 1921 (aged 26)	6	0	(Ecuadorian Football Federation) Barcelona SC

== Paraguay ==
Head Coach: (Paraguay) Manuel Fleitas Solich

No.	Pos.	Player	Date of birth (age)	Caps	Goals	Club
—	FW	Enrique Avalos	1922 (aged 25)	0	0	(Paraguayan Football Association) Cerro Porteño
—	FW	Arturo Bobadilla		0	0	(Paraguayan Football Association) Cerro Porteño
—	MF	Castor Cantero	12 January 1918 (aged 29)	3	0	(Paraguayan Football Association) Olimpia
—	DF	Casiano Céspedes	30 November 1923 (aged 24)	0	0	(Paraguayan Football Association) Olimpia
—	FW	Pedro Fernández		0	0	(Paraguayan Football Association) Cerro Porteño
—	GK	Sinforiano García	22 August 1924 (aged 23)	0	0	(Paraguayan Football Association) Cerro Porteño
—	MF	Manuel Gavilán	30 November 1920 (aged 27)	0	0	(Paraguayan Football Association) Libertad
—	FW	Alejandrino Genés		0	0	(Paraguayan Football Association) Club Nacional
—	DF	Enrique Hugo		0	0	(Paraguayan Football Association) Guaraní
—	FW	César López Fretes	21 March 1923 (aged 24)	0	0	(Paraguayan Football Association) Olimpia
—	FW	Leocadio Marín		0	0	(Paraguayan Football Association) Olimpia
—	FW	Vicente Miño		0	0	(Paraguayan Football Association) Club Nacional
—	FW	Ranulfo Miranda	27 May 1927 (aged 20)	0	0	(Paraguayan Football Association) Club Nacional
—	MF	José Ocampos		0	0	(Paraguayan Football Association) Club Nacional
—	FW	Santiago Rivas		0	0	(Paraguayan Football Association) Cerro Porteño
—	FW	Vicente Sánchez		5	1	(Paraguayan Football Association) Club Nacional
—	FW	Juan Bautista Villalba	29 August 1924 (aged 23)	0	0	(Paraguayan Football Association) Sportivo Luqueño
—	MF	Roque Zarza		0	0	

== Peru ==
Head Coach: (Peru) José Arana Cruz

No.	Pos.	Player	Date of birth (age)	Caps	Goals	Club
—	GK	Rafael Asca	24 October 1924 (aged 23)	0	0	(Peruvian Football Federation) Sport Boys
—	FW	Guillermo Barbadillo	9 January 1925 (aged 22)	0	0	(Peruvian Football Federation) Sport Boys
—	FW	Félix Castillo	21 February 1928 (aged 19)	0	0	(Peruvian Football Federation) Alianza Lima
—	MF	Juan Castillo	22 August 1924 (aged 23)	0	0	(Peruvian Football Federation) Atlético Chalaco
—	DF	Andrés da Silva	21 March 1921 (aged 26)	0	0	(Peruvian Football Federation) Universitario de Deportes
—	FW	Teodoro Fernández	20 May 1913 (aged 34)	27	24	(Peruvian Football Federation) Universitario de Deportes
—	FW	Carlos Gómez Sánchez	4 October 1923 (aged 24)	0	0	(Peruvian Football Federation) Alianza Lima
—	FW	Alejandro González	17 March 1915 (aged 32)	1	0	(Peruvian Football Federation) Alianza Lima
—	MF	Luis Guzmán	2 September 1918 (aged 29)	6	1	(Peruvian Football Federation) Deportivo Municipal
—	MF	Cornelio Heredia	16 October 1920 (aged 27)	0	0	(Peruvian Football Federation) Alianza Lima
—	FW	Valeriano López	4 May 1926 (aged 21)	0	0	(Peruvian Football Federation) Sport Boys
—	DF	Eliseo Morales		0	0	(Peruvian Football Federation) Atlético Chalaco
—	FW	Ernesto Morales	17 May 1925 (aged 22)	0	0	(Peruvian Football Federation) Atlético Chalaco
—	FW	Máximo Mosquera	8 January 1928 (aged 19)	0	0	(Peruvian Football Federation) Deportivo Municipal
—	MF	Lorenzo Pacheco	10 August 1919 (aged 28)	0	0	(Peruvian Football Federation) Sport Boys
—	DF	Enrique Perales	18 January 1914 (aged 33)	9	0	(Peruvian Football Federation) Deportivo Municipal
—	MF	Domingo Raffo	31 March 1920 (aged 27)	0	0	(Peruvian Football Federation) Atlético Chalaco
—	FW	Marín Reyna		0	0	(Peruvian Football Federation) Mariscal Sucre
—	MF	René Rosasco	29 October 1924 (aged 23)	0	0	(Peruvian Football Federation) Atlético Chalaco
—	GK	Luis Suárez	17 May 1926 (aged 21)	0	0	(Peruvian Football Federation) Deportivo Municipal
—	DF	Carlos Torres	6 October 1923 (aged 24)	0	0	(Peruvian Football Federation) Atlético Chalaco
—	FW	Guillermo Valdivieso	26 May 1921 (aged 26)	0	0	(Peruvian Football Federation) Sport Boys

== Uruguay ==
Head Coach: (Uruguay) Juan López Fontana

No.	Pos.	Player	Date of birth (age)	Caps	Goals	Club
—	MF	Lorenzo Barreto		0	0	(Uruguayan Football Association) Central Español
—	FW	Julio César Britos	18 May 1926 (aged 21)	0	0	(Uruguayan Football Association) Peñarol
—	MF	José Cajiga	24 September 1926 (aged 21)	6	0	(Uruguayan Football Association) Rampla Juniors
—	MF	Oscar Chelle	19 February 1922 (aged 25)	0	0	(Uruguayan Football Association) Montevideo Wanderers
—	FW	Nicolás Falero	11 January 1921 (aged 26)	5	2	(Uruguayan Football Association) Peñarol
—	FW	Ramón Ferrés	6 June 1921 (aged 26)	0	0	(Uruguayan Football Association) Defensor Sporting
—	DF	Roberto Gadea		0	0	(Uruguayan Football Association) Miramar Misiones
—	DF	Schubert Gambetta	14 April 1920 (aged 27)	18	2	(Uruguayan Football Association) Club Nacional de Football
—	FW	José García	21 February 1926 (aged 21)	10	3	(Uruguayan Football Association) Defensor Sporting
—	FW	Miguel Angel Lariccia		0	0	(Uruguayan Football Association) Central Español
—	DF	Mario Lorenzo		0	0	(Uruguayan Football Association) Peñarol
—	FW	Héctor Magliano	30 November 1919 (aged 28)	5	0	(Uruguayan Football Association) Montevideo Wanderers
—	DF	Luis Pérez Luz		0	0	(Uruguayan Football Association) River Plate Montevideo
—	FW	Washington Puente		0	0	(Uruguayan Football Association) Rampla Juniors
—	FW	Juan Riephoff		13	3	(Uruguayan Football Association) Rampla Juniors
—	DF	José Riobó		0	0	(Uruguayan Football Association) Defensor Sporting
—	DF	Víctor Rodríguez Andrade		0	0	(Uruguayan Football Association) Central Español
—	MF	Hosiriz Romero		0	0	(Uruguayan Football Association) Liverpool
—	GK	Francisco Sabini		0	0	(Uruguayan Football Association) Central Español
—	MF	Raúl Sarro		5	0	(Uruguayan Football Association) Defensor Sporting
—	FW	Washington Stula		0	0	(Uruguayan Football Association) Cerro
—	DF	Eusebio Tejera	6 January 1922 (aged 25)	8	0	(Uruguayan Football Association) Nacional
—	DF	Julio Terra	1 January 1920 (aged 27)	0	0	(Uruguayan Football Association) River Plate
—	GK	Juan Tulic		0	0	(Uruguayan Football Association) River Plate
—	DF	Alfredo Young		0	0	(Uruguayan Football Association) Defensor Sporting
