= Luis Suárez =

Luis Suárez may refer to:

- Luis Suárez (bishop), Spanish Roman Catholic bishop, bishop of Dragonara, 1554–c. 1580
- Luis Suárez (baseball) (1916–1991), Cuban baseball player
- Luis Suárez (actor) (1945–1992), Spanish actor, appeared in La barraca (TV series) et al.
- Luis Mauricio Suárez (born 1979), Mexican baseball manager and player
- Luis Suárez Fernández (1924–2024), Spanish historian
- Luis Suárez (Argentine footballer) (1938–2005), Argentine footballer
- Luis Suárez (Colombian footballer) (born 1997), Colombian footballer
- Luis Suárez (Peruvian footballer) (1926–2014), Peruvian footballer
- Luis Suárez (Spanish footballer) (1935–2023), Spanish footballer and manager
- Luis Suárez (Uruguayan footballer) (born 1987), Uruguayan footballer
- Luis Fernando Suárez (born 1959), Colombian footballer and manager

== See also ==
- Luis Ruiz Suárez (1913–2011), Spanish-born Macanese Jesuit priest and missionary
