= Montevideo Wanderers F.C. =

Uruguayan association football club

Montevideo Wanderers
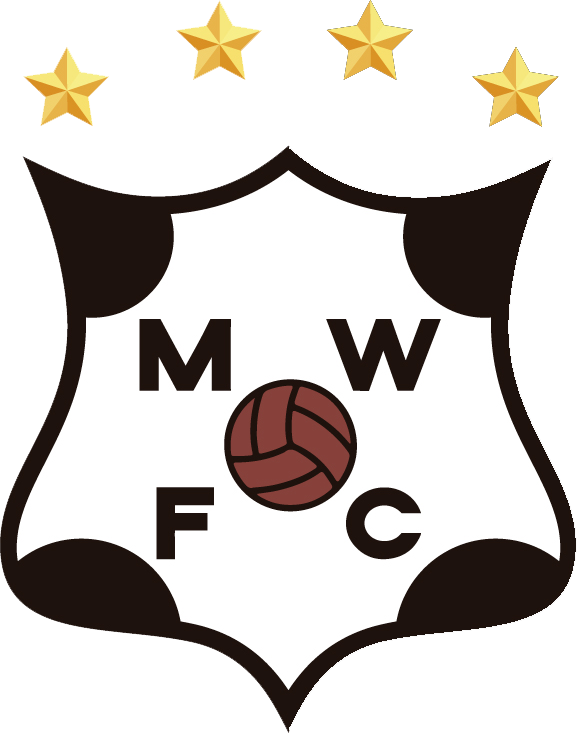
- Full name: Montevideo Wanderers Fútbol Club
- Nicknames: Bohemios; Vagabundos
- Founded: 15 August 1902; 124 years ago
- Ground: Estadio Alfredo Victor Viera, Montevideo
- Capacity: 10,000
- Chairman: Gabriel Blanco
- Manager: Vacant
- League: Liga AUF Uruguaya
- 2025: Liga AUF Uruguaya, 14th of 16
- Website: www.mwfc.com.uy
| Home colours | Away colours | Third colours |

Montevideo Wanderers Fútbol Club, usually known simply as Wanderers, is a Uruguayan professional football club based in Montevideo. The club are currently members of the Primera División and play at the Estadio Viera. Beside football, the club also has teams playing basketball, volleyball, athletics, futsal, pool and pelota.

== History ==
=== Origins (1898–1931) ===
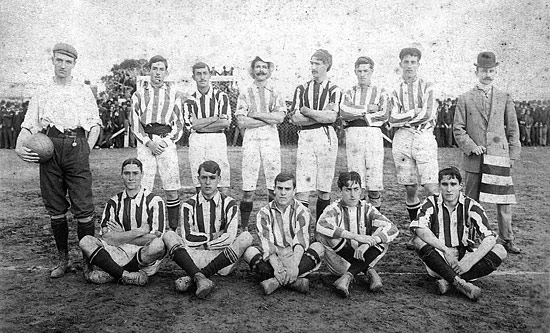
The team of 1906 that won the Primera División and Copa Competencia championships

The Montevideo Wanderers was founded in the end of the 19th century, made up of a group of idealistic young people who wanted to express their sporting principles in a club where they were truly the protagonists of their own decisions.

Led by the Sardeson brothers, the community quickly became a well-known group in their neighborhood of origin, El Prado. Its name was born as a result of a trip by Enrique Sardeson and Juan Sardeson to England.

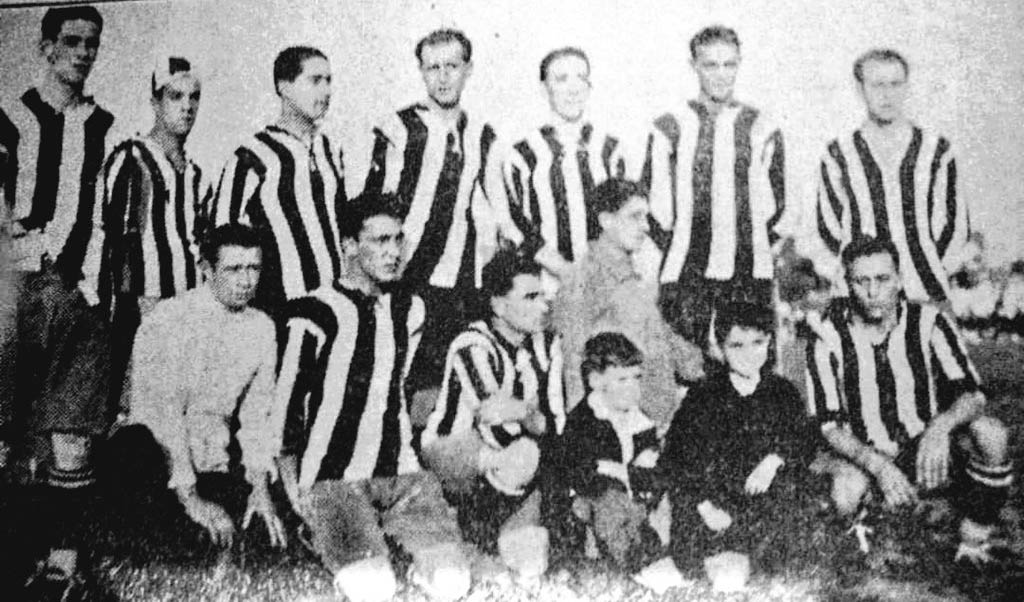
Team of Wanderers of 1923, when the team won the FUF championship

In England at that time The Wanderers were a prominent team, although it was not the only Club with that name playing in the English tournament, since it coexisted with Wolverhampton Wanderers, an institution that currently plays in The Championship, and Bolton Wanderers F.C. as well.

The local League did not yet exist, so the team's competition was summed up to simple friendly matches. Most of the members of Wanderers played at the same time for the Albión Football Club, an entity that was the founder of the current Uruguayan Football Association, participating since the first Uruguayan tournament organized by it.

Differences fundamentally in the sports field led this group of young people led by the Sardeson brothers to found the Montevideo Wanderers Football Club with all the legal and administrative requirements on the afternoon of August 15, 1902 in the Almacén y Bar de la calle 19 de Abril. at the current intersection of the same street and Adolfo Berro.

The representative emblems of the wanderista team were a blue and white shirt with thin vertical stripes, white pants, and black socks.

Its first president was Mr Juan Sardeson.

=== Birth of the professional era (1932–1951) ===
With the advent of professionalism, a new stage was born in Uruguayan football. In 1932 the Uruguayan Championship was disputed by ten institutions, one of which was Montevideo Wanderers. In that year Wanderers obtained the fifth position losing vanguard positions in the last dates. A year later, they inaugurated the Wanderers Park, on October 15, with a victory over Bella Vista by 2–0, a match corresponding to the Uruguayan Championship, a scenario where the bohemians are currently tenants. In 1934 Wanderers is the first non-traditional club to play a final for an official tournament. They play against Nacional the final of the tournament falling defeated by 3–0. In those years the Uruguayan tournaments were played in three stages.

Wanderers almost always topped the table with Nacional and Peñarol in the official tournaments. They were third in the Uruguayan championships of 1934, 1935, 1937, 1939, 1940 and 1942.

In 1937 Montevideo Wanderers is notable Champion of the Uruguayan Honor Tournament by defeating Nacional by 3–0, the bohemians were the third team behind albos(National) and mirasoles(Peñarol) to obtain an official First Division tournament.

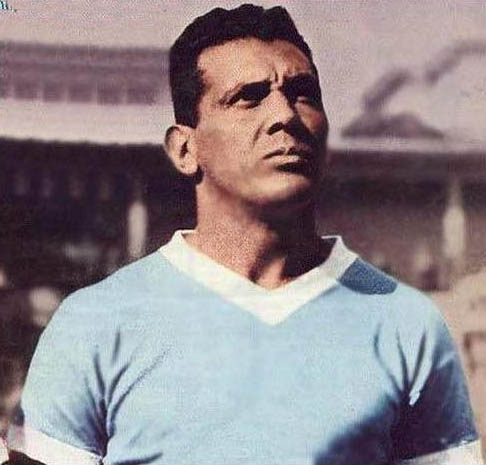
Obdulio Varela (here pictured with the Uruguay national team) was a key player of the 1930s

The Obdulio Varela in Wanderers debuted in 1938 and played for five seasons with the albinegro where he demonstrated his category for the events. He exhibited his vigor in the midfield and was a specialist in the execution of penalty shots.

In 1939 the Bohemians are vice champions of the Uruguayan Honor Championship. In 1942, three dates from the end of the Uruguayan Championship, disputing the title inch by inch with the two classic banners. The wanderista team finished third in the tournament. By 1943, already distant, the great captain obtained fourth place in the local tournament, an event that would be repeated a year later.

In the middle of that decade, for the first time, the bohemians are located at the bottom of the table of the Uruguayan tournament. As much as the Albinegros leaders hire experienced figures from Argentina, they cannot bring the team back to the top positions of other years.

In 1950 the Bohemians finished in the last positions in the table with Club Atlético Bella Vista.

The Association set tiebreakers to see which team remained in the top division and who was relegated. The first final marked the papal(Bella Vista) victory by 2–1, the second resulted in a victory for Wanderers by 1-0 and the third tied at two. For the time being, and since the institutions did not agree on the setting of a fourth game, it was decided that who should determine the relegation of that season was a draw. So it was. Luck accompanied the bohemian team and Bella Vista had to descend to Second Division.

The bohemians must play for the first time in the promotion division

After the meager results of the Competition and the first round of the Uruguayan championship, the wanderista board decided to hire a large number of Argentine players, including their top scorer of those years, Eduardo Ricagni.

Although the performance clearly improved, it could not avoid relegation by one point to the Second Division.

=== Promotions and Relegations (1952–1972) ===
In 1952, when the Montevideo Wanderers had their 50th anniversary, it had to be a member of the Second Division for the first time due to the state of the economy.

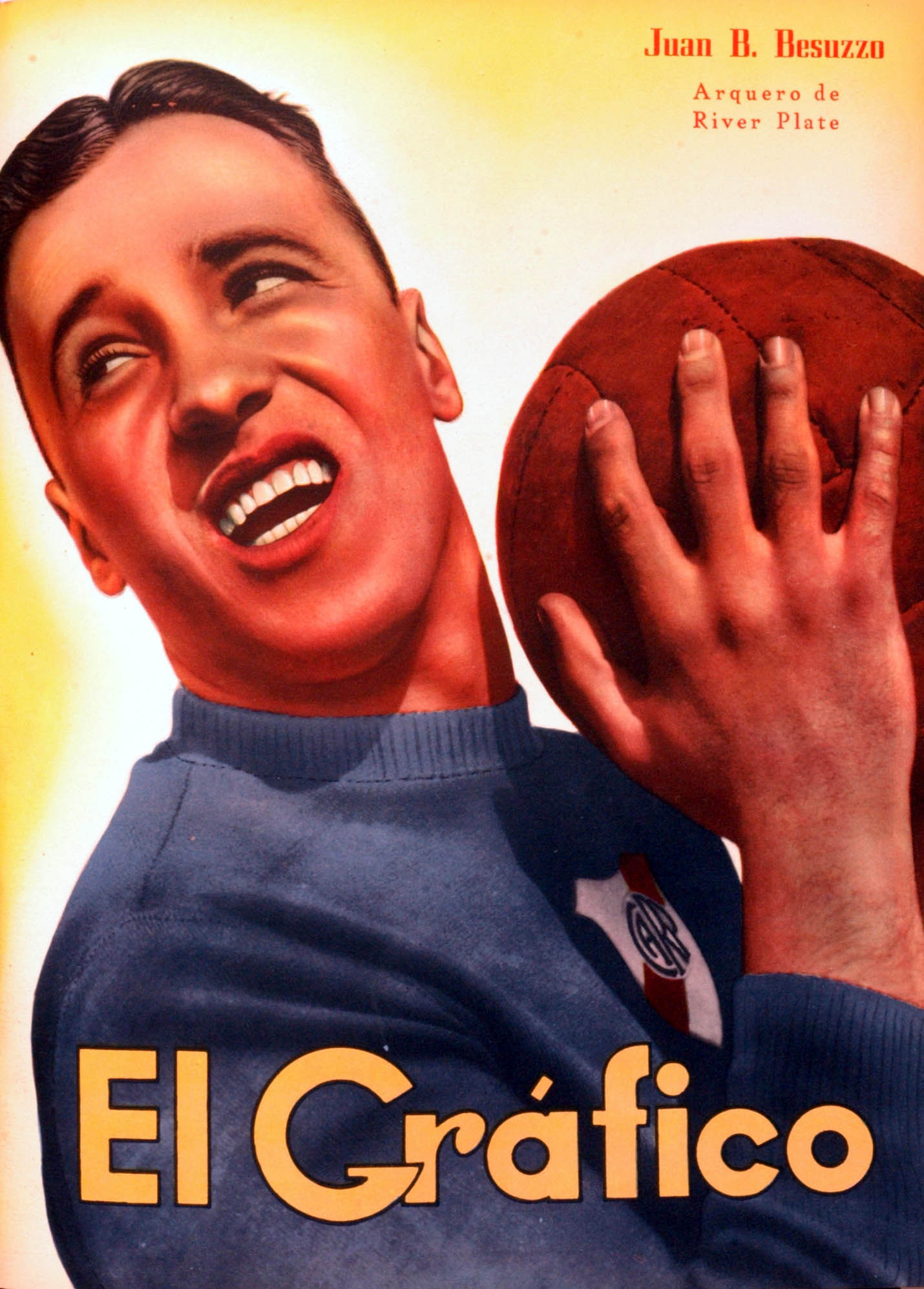
Juan Besuzzo on the cover of Argentine magazine El Gráfico, 1939

Some players from the previous season's squad remained, others joined and certain players who had announced their retirement reconsidered their decision. The most important example was that of José María Medina, a great scorer who stayed for another year so that the team he loved would return to the top division. In addition, the return of the great goalkeeper Juan Bautista Besuzzo who had also made the decision to retire was highlighted. After a great campaign, the Bohemians obtained the title of Uruguayan Champion, immediately returning to the First Division.

In 1953 the Bohemians fulfilled a commendable performance in the Uruguayan Tournament fulfilling the objective of remaining in the category, a fact that was repeated in the following campaign. In both seasons, center forward Oscar Chelle stood out, who with his goals made it possible to win points for the Albinegro team. When the middle of the decade was reached, the albinegros returned to the top positions in national football.

In 1956 the club obtained the fourth place in the competition tournament and fifth in the Uruguayan tournament. The 1957 Championship Competition marked the Wanderers' return to the definition of an official tournament. In the absence of a date, the Bohemians were even with Peñarol. On the last date the wanderers faced Racing in Parque Viera. The Bohemians displayed their best football but could not break the great albiverde defense ending the match tied 0-0. Meanwhile, Peñarol easily defeated his rival obtaining the title. Months later, the Bohemians took their revenge by beating Racing by 4–0 away from home, condemning them to relegation to the second category.

In 1958, one of the most colorful players in all of Bohemian history, Julio Toja, began to form part of the team. In those years he was part of a great wandering front line made up of Rumbo, Nario, Guaglianone (scorer in the 1959 Uruguayan Championship), him and De León. That year Wanderers finished in fifth place in the Uruguayan table, the same position it held in the 1959 and 1960 seasons.

In 1961 there were several changes in the albinegra institution. He even completely modifies his uniform. Leaving the classic dress for years of thick black and white vertical stripes, black pants and gray socks for a uniform with thin black and white vertical stripes, white pants and white socks. It was an irregular year for the bohemian. They finished at the bottom of the table, defining relegation with Centro Atlético Fénix who won the finals by 4-0 and 3–2.

In 1962, Wanderers returned to the First Division after winning the Second Division championship. The team included players such as Walter Taibo (goalkeeper), Beico and Nelson Diaz (defenders), Hermin and Poy Moreira (midfielders), and Castelnoble, Ledesma, Guaglianone, Ferreri, and De Leon (forwards).

Returning to division A, the performance of the first team was brilliant. Third in the 1963 and 1964 seasons, having memorable afternoons at the Centenario Stadium against the greats. The team in those two campaigns does not suffer major changes. He lined up Taibo, Beico, Diaz, Hermin, Poy, Cámera, Castelnoble, Ledesma or Bertochi, Guaglianone or Flores, Toja and Ferreri. In addition, Wandererses was the club that brought the most public to the fields after Nacional and Peñarol in those years.

In 1965 the campaign in the local tournament was very poor. He finished penultimate. For 1966 a new descent system was created. For the first time the score was accumulated of the Uruguayan Tournament of the previous year. Good campaigns but without promotion 1967–1968. He fights for promotion in both Tournaments. In 1968, they remained first until the last date, but lost 1–0 with Bella Vista in a very controversial match, relegating the Bohemian team to third place.

In 1969 the Albinegro team experienced its worst crisis. With great economic and therefore sports limitations, he faced the season culminating in sixth place. In 1970 he improves the position finishing fourth. In that season, one of the best goalkeepers in the history of Wanderers made his debut, Miguel Ortiz, who joined from Argentina.

During those years, Mateo Giri became president of the club. With him, Wanderers recovered, local prominence and international prestige. In 1971 and 1972 Wanderers formed a strong team that made it return to the first division.

The Bohemians settled in Las Piedras and in that city after beating Racing by 1–0 with a goal by Aníbal Alves, they returned to the First Division at the end of the last named season.

=== Entertainer again in the Primera (1973–1991) ===
In 1973, with the aim of remaining in the first division, a team was formed with a stronger defense. The Albinegros once again obtained points at the Centenario Stadium against Nacional, Peñarol. Finally, he finished in a position, saving himself from any relegation commitment.

In 1974-1975 Wanderers again got into the big story. Qualified for the first time to the Copa Libertadores. After an acceptable Uruguayan Championship and a great Olympic Champions Tournament, the bohemians earned the right to participate in the first edition of the Pre-Libertadores de América league. The Albinegros began their campaign with a defeat against Danubio by 2–1. Later on the second date he fell again this time against Peñarol by 2–0. He recovered on the third date beating Cerro in Belvedere by 5–3. They later beat Liverpool 3–2. That made it possible for the bohemian who, with a victory against Nacional on the last date, would enter the Copa Libertadores for the first time. On January 28, 1975, Wanderers wrote another page of glory by defeating Nacional 2–1 with a goal by Washington Olivera in the last minute of stoppage time. On March 14, 1975, Wanderers won their first victory in the Copa Libertadores by beating Unión Huaral 4–0 with two goals from Manuel Sierra and two from Héctor de los Santos. Although the Bohemians did not pass the series (a time when only the Group winners qualified), they left high the prestige of the rich history of the Prado institution.

In 1976 he returned to the top places in local tournaments.He qualified third in the Major League, fifth in the Uruguayan and fourth in the Liguilla Pre Libertadores when with two dates to go he was first and undefeated. The pointers Richard Forlán and Washington Olivera stood out, considered by the press and the fans as the best of the local season in their positions.Undefeated Champion of the Capital-Interior integration. Protagonist in Uruguayan soccer.

In 1977 he won the title, defeating Peñarol twice, among others, both by 2–1. He placed sixth in the Uruguayan Championship and third in the Liguilla. On the penultimate date, they drew 0–0 with Danubio where a goal against Wanderers converted by Olivera was annulled and it was never known why. He fell in the last match against Peñarol when the tie assured the bohemian the first position.

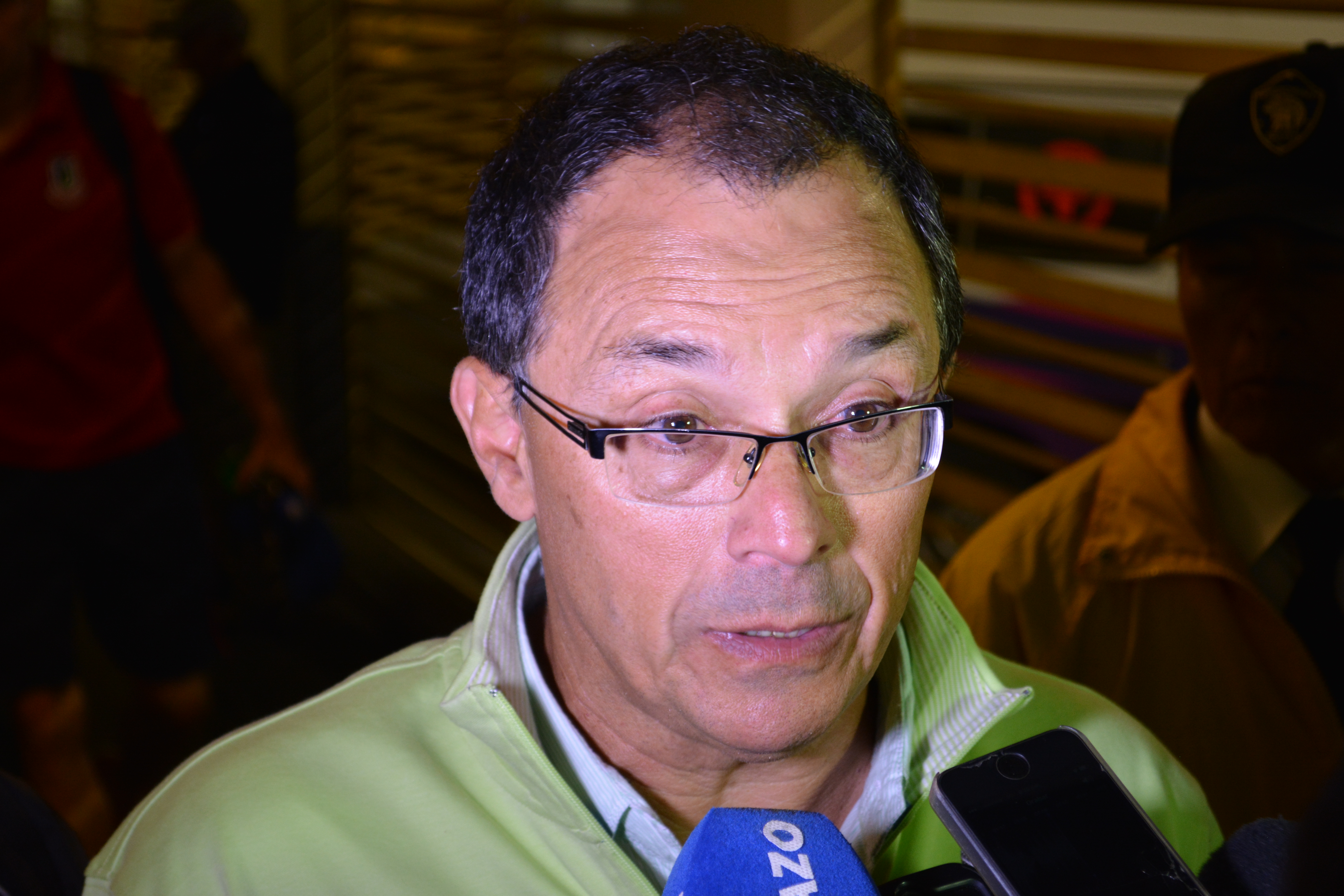
Alfredo Arias Former player and manager of Wanderers

In 1978 he recovered the fifth position in the Uruguayan Tournament, the center forward Alfredo Arias was a great figure. For the Major League Wanderers thrashed Peñarol at the Franzini with all their figures by 4–0 on a freezing afternoon where there was even hail. He entered fifth in the Liguilla.

When 1979 arrived, there was an important replacement of players in the first team. Jorge Walter Barrios, from Pedreña, made his debut and established himself as the starter. On October 17, 1979, in an inspired night, Wanderers overwhelmed Nacional by Uruguayan 5–1 with two goals from Yanes, one from Pizzani from a penalty, another from Krasouski and the last from Estavillo in a fierce counterattack.

Uruguayan Vice Champion in 1980.With the team that was the base of the third division champion plus the players that remained from previous years, Wanderers had a brilliant season where they became Uruguayan vice-champion, being only surpassed by the National Football Club, in that season champion of America and the World. In the Liguilla he lost the classification to the Copa Libertadores in an incredible match with Bella Vista.

In 1981 he finished third in the Uruguayan placement behind Peñarol and Nacional. He was fifth in the Liguilla.

The following season, the bohemians managed to put together a highly balanced team and as a fair reward they won the vice championship in the Pre-Liguilla Libertadores de América after beating Defensor on penalties 5–2.

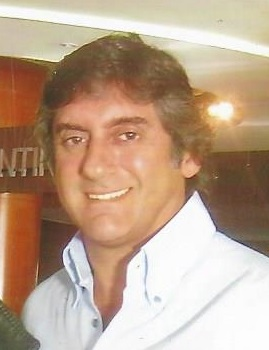
Enzo Francescoli

In 1983, Enzo Francescoli said goodbye to the Albinegro team, emigrating to Argentina. In the Copa Libertadores Wanderers carried out a brilliant performance finishing seventh in the table, being their best participation in the history of said tournament.

In 1984 the Bohemians finished sixth in the Uruguayan in an acceptable season.

1985 Uruguayan vice-champion again. For the third time in La Libertadores. Under the technical direction of Óscar Tabárez Wanderers won second place in the Uruguayan Championship behind Peñarol. The bohemians usually lined up Otero, Rebollo, Madrid, Diaz, Peña, Delgado Peletti, Sergio González, Noé, Báez, Bengoechea. It qualified for the Copa Libertadores de América for the third time. It also won the Uruguayan Third Division Championship.

In a disputed final in 1986 against Central Español Wanderers, he is again Champion of an official First Division Tournament, a championship that was named after the National Commission of Physical Education. In the Copa Libertadores, they failed to get through the first phase, culminating in second place in the group behind River Plate from Argentina, who would ultimately be Champion of America that year.

In the year 1987, Wanderers reached the title of Champion in the Competition Championship and the Pre-Liberator League of America, being about to obtain all the contests since in the Uruguayan with only three dates remaining, it still had the possibility of obtaining the title. In the final of the Liguilla he lined up Otero, F.González, Madrid, Sanguinetti, Peña, Delgado, Peletti, Berger, Báez, Noé and Di Pascua. In the decisive match, they defeated Nacional 1–0 with a goal by Di Pascua. He was also crowned Champion of the Uruguayan Third Division Championship. It was directed throughout the season by Gregorio Pérez.

In 1988 his participation was irregular, he defeated Millonarios de Colombia and played equal matches with Nacional de Montevideo Champion of America that year. He repeated the title of Uruguayan Champion of the Third Division.

In the following year the albinegros are vice-champions of the Competition Championship beating Peñarol by 2–1 in the Viera Park with notable work by Walter Pelletti.

In the final round the Albinegros in 1990 one week defeated Nacional and Peñarol 3-2 and 1-0 respectively. He repeatedly formed with Sosa, F.González, Barón, Díaz, Juan Carlos Paz, Romero, Adomaitis, Daniel Fernández, Barboza, Leivas, Di Pascua.

In 1991 he finished third in the Uruguayan Championship in the second round with the return of Walter Peletti and Jorge Barrios.

=== Libertadores and Sudamericana (1992–2015) ===
After the eighties and the nineties, Wanderers marked a performance in official competitions in the following seasons. In the last vestige of the generation of the eighties, in 1992 Wanderers lost in the last match of the Uruguayan Championship when they tied with Racing in Parque Viera for the classification to the Pre-Liguilla Libertadores de América. Both in that season and in 1993 with the return of Jorge Barrios to the institution, the Bohemians had great performances at the Centenario Stadium, preferably against Peñarol, where they won resounding victories.

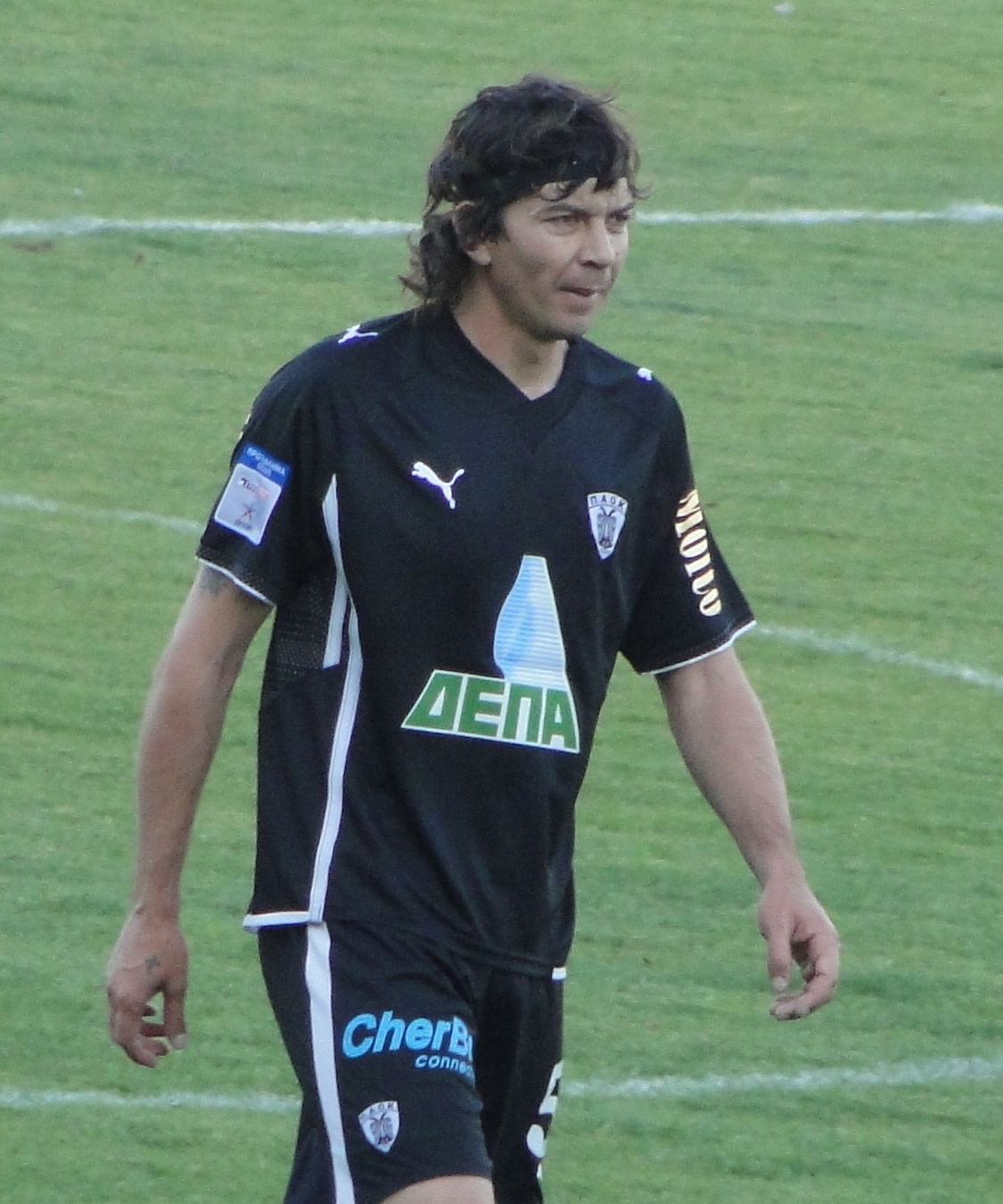
Pablo García product of Montevideo Wanderers Academies

Wanderers about to win the 1994 Torneo Clausura title. For the first time the activity of the Uruguayan was divided into Opening-Closing Tournaments and Annual Table. With the scoring appearance of the Argentine Juan Carlos Juarez, plus the contributions of the good strikers Javier Barragán and Juan Ravera, with the value of the indefatigable Jorge Barrios and the solvency of Alejandro Barón in the rear, the albinegros with three dates left were in a hand in hand with Peñarol to define the Clausura. But a very bad ending determined that he was relegated to third place in said Championship and fifth place in the Annual table. For this reason, he had to participate in the Integration Tournament to qualify for the Pre-Liberator Liguilla, a fact that did not occur due to a bad auction of the Championship.

In 1995 Wanderers returned to the Liguilla Pre Libertadores. Due to a great performance in the Opening Tournament and an acceptable Closing Tournament, the bohemians qualified after several years for the Pre Libertadores Playoffs. In the first part of the year, Pablo Correa and Juan Ravera stood out on the offensive side, Juan Amondarain and Jorge Barrios in the middle, and Carlos Martínez, a defender with a great career, at defense. In the second part of the year, Darío Delgado stood out as a polyfunctional defender and scorer.

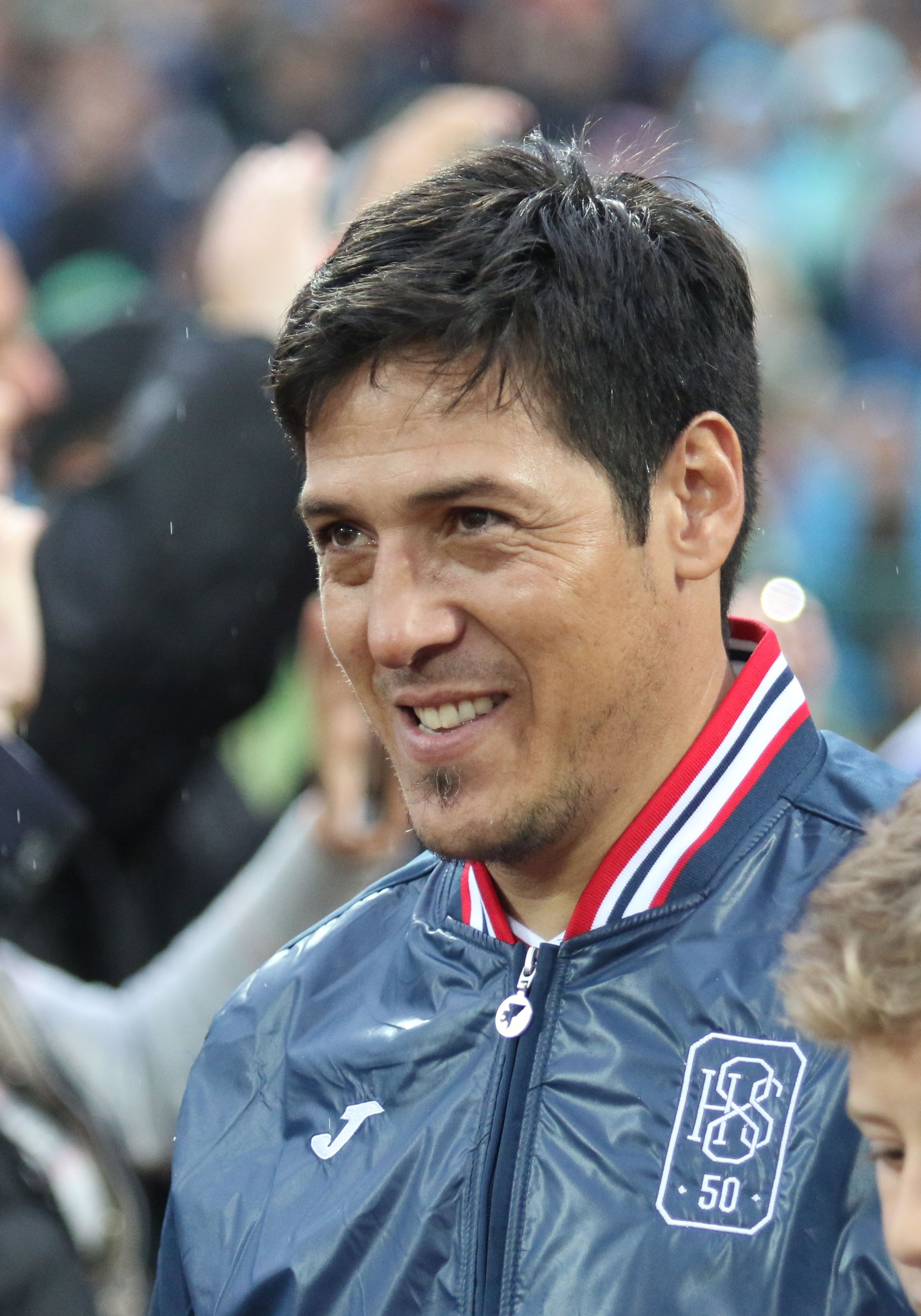
Camoranesi former player of Wanderers

The gradual decline, 1996-1997. The appearance in Wanderers of Mauro Camoranesi. In the 1996 season the Wanderers fought to avoid relegation. They tied with nine players against Cerro, defeated Peñarol and Nacional, remaining in the division. Paraguayan Duarte stood out with his important goals. In 1997, Mauro Camoranesi joined the team, and he would later gain world fame, being several times the Champion in Italian soccer and was even World Champion with Italy. With the Wanderers he is credited with a great goal to Rampla in the Olympic defining from area to area. The bohemians at the end of the Uruguayan Championship finished in seventh position.

Descent and drama 1998. After a great Apertura where he finished fifth with River Plate, he was followed by a lousy Clausura where he finished last without any wins, three draws and eight losses. He was relegated after almost thirty years of his return to the First Division.

Disappointment in Second Division 1999. The Albinegros hired a large number of experienced players in order to obtain a quick return to the highest division of our football. But these figures failed culminating the team wanderista seventh, its worst position in its history.

Second Grand Champion, 2000. The retirement of Jorge Barrios.

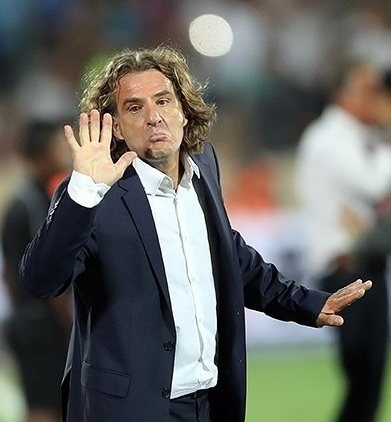
Carreño long serving manager of Wanderers

Under the direction of former bohemian player José Daniel Carreño, the Albinegros returned to the circle of privilege after a great campaign. The team preferably lined up Nanni, Claudio Dadómo, Julio Ramirez, Santiago Ostolaza, Bonilla, Ronald Ramirez, Machado, Sebastián Eguren, Larrea, Bengua, De Souza. He secured the title with a victory at Parque Viera against Salus by 2–0 with goals from Alejandro Larrea. For the second time Undefeated Champion of the Liguilla, 2001.

After a great Qualifying Tournament and beating Central in a draw, Wanderers qualified for the Liguilla where they deservedly won the title after beating Fénix 4–1, drawing with Defensor one to one and overwhelming Danubio in the final. for 3–0. In the decisive match he lined up Nanni, Scotti – Julio Ramirez – Curbelo – Dadomo, Ronald Ramirez – Eguren – Machado – Sergio Blanco – Guglielmone – Julio de Souza.

Again in the Copa Libertadores, 2002. For the first time in its history, the Prado club qualified for the second phase of the tournament. He was eliminated on penalties in a vibrant definition against Club Atlético Peñarol.

Great performance Opening Tournament 2003. Under the technical direction of Jorge Barrios, the Prado team finished in the top positions of the 2003 Opening Tournament. It did not repeat in the Closing. In any case, he qualified for the Liguilla where he had an irregular performance.

Again in the league 2004. He participated in the Liguilla without major significance.

The year 2005 passes without major relevant events. In 2005, the dispute system of the Uruguayan Championships was modified, resembling the European system, that is, from June to June of each year. In the 2005/2006 Uruguayan Tournament, more precisely on June 14, 2006, Wanderers thrashed Peñarol by five to one after being at a disadvantage with three goals from Aliberti, one from Chaves and another from Dadomo.

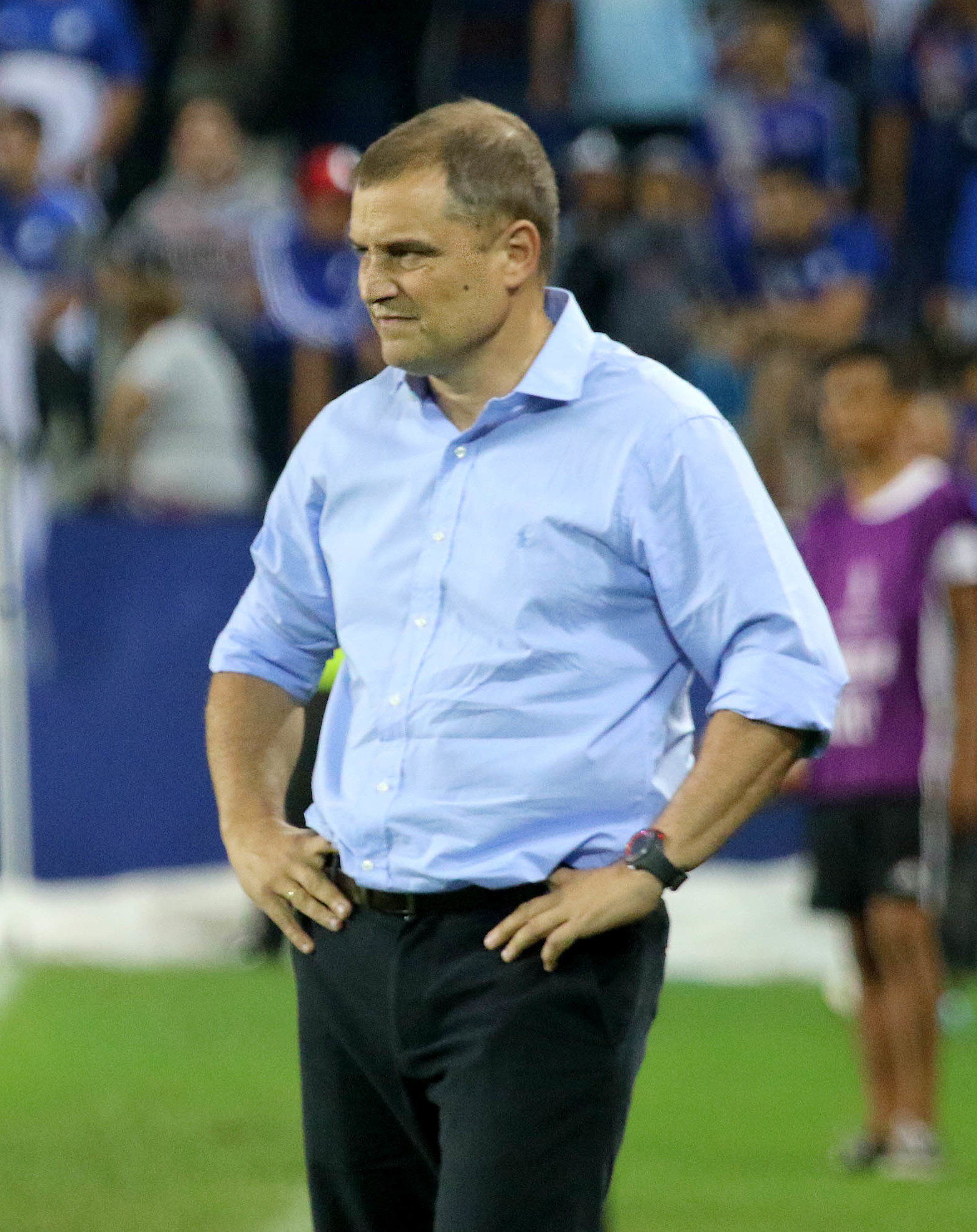
Diego Aguirre club manager in season 2007

Great Uruguayan Championship 2006/2007. Once again they qualified for the Copa Libertadores. First under the technical direction of Daniel Carreño where the team was the leader of the Opening Tournament for several dates and then with the technical direction of Diego Aguirre the Albinegro team was a true protagonist of it.

In 2009–2012. Performances in official tournaments. In recent seasons, the Bohemians have achieved a sporting regularity that places them in the advanced positions in the Uruguayan Tournaments. The victory over Nacional on October 17, 2009, for the Uruguayan Championship by 4–0. Today, a future awaits him, waiting for the Bohemians to live days of glory as marked by its history.

With Alfredo Arias as Technical Director and a great performance by Maxi Rodríguez, Wanderers finished the championship 6th and qualified for the Copa Sudamericana for the first time in its history. In the first phase of the Copa Sudamericana, Bohemio faced Libertad from Paraguay. Being eliminated, after losing in the first leg in Montevideo by 1 to 2 and the second leg in Paraguay by 0-0.

In 2014, Wanderers is crowned Champion of the Closing Tournament. Under the leadership of Alfredo Arias, El Bohemio achieved this historic championship on the last date, after beating El Tanque Sisley 1–0. Montevideo Wanderers win the Clausura and the Annual Table, with the goal converted in Florida by Maximiliano Olivera. After a series of matches with Danubio, the Bohemian loses the Uruguayan Championship on penalties, in the Central Park.

Libertadores Cup in 2015. The role of Montevideo Wanderers in the international arena was very prominent. Qualifying for the Eighth finals of the Libertadores, after finishing second in the group stage with: Boca Juniors, Palestino and Zamora F.C. In the Round of 16, Bohemio was eliminated against Racing de Avellaneda, drawing 1–1 in the first leg in Montevideo with a goal from Matías Santos. Defining the series in Argentina, falling 2 to 1 with the local. In Wanderers, Maxi Olivera converted from a free kick. In the local tournament, the Bohemian did not have a great performance, without qualifying for international cups.

=== Continuing international course (2016–present) ===
In the 2015-2016 season with Gastón Machado as technical director, the team is establishing itself in the championship. Wanderers finished 5th in the Annual Table, qualifying for the Copa Sudamericana for the second time. Gastón Rodríguez finished as Top Scorer in the Clausura Tournament with 16 goals and in the Uruguayan Tournament with 19 goals.

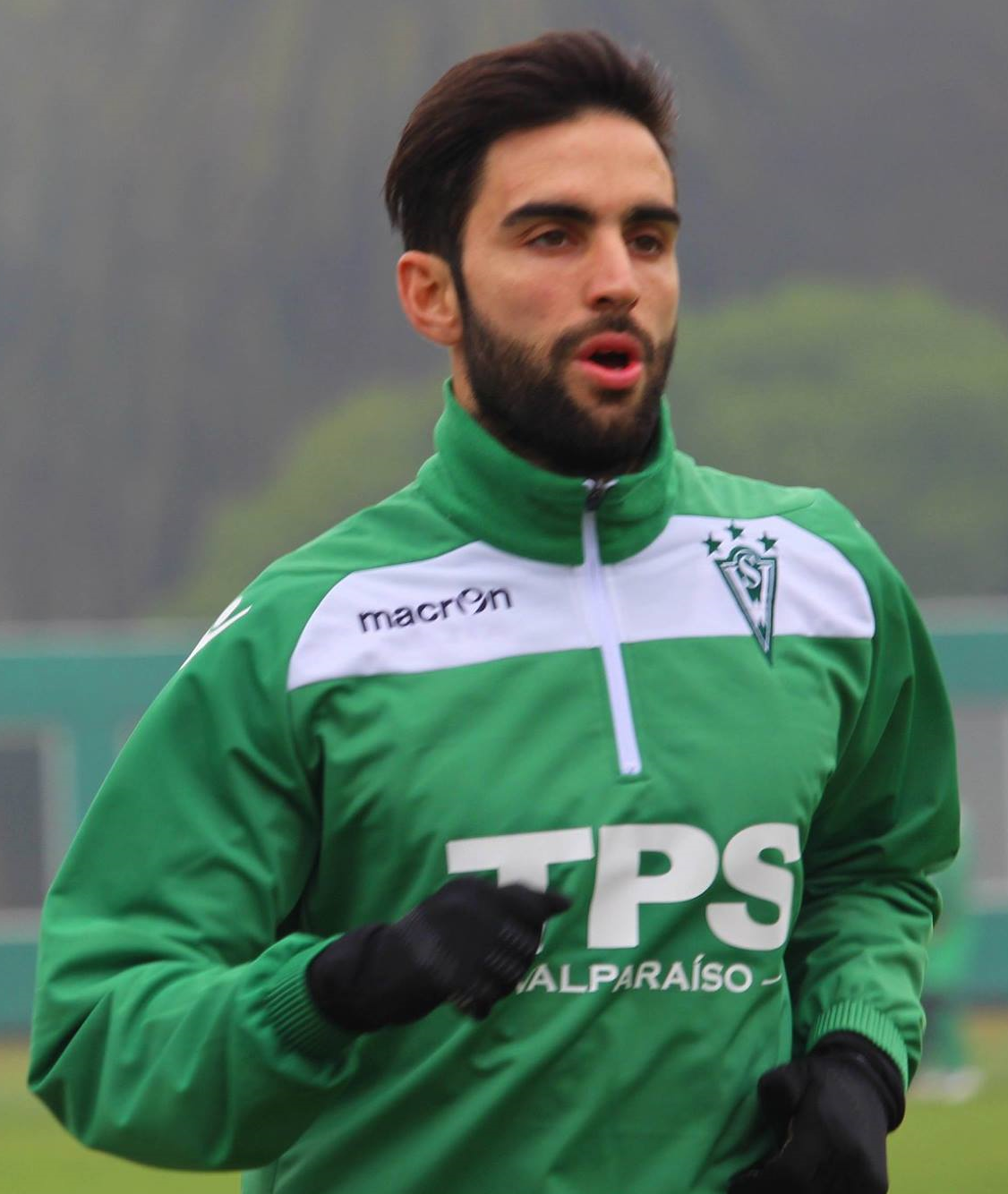
Rodrigo Pastorini

In the 2017 El Bohemio finishes the Uruguayan Championship 4th, qualifying for the first phase of the Copa Conmebol Libertadores. Wanderers again have the top scorer of the Championship. Cristian Palacios with 29 goals (19 converted with the Bohemio shirt). Sergio Blanco becomes the club's all-time top scorer with 105 goals.

Year 2018. Wanderers again participating in International Cups, faces Olimpia from Paraguay for the first Phase of the Cup. Losing 0–2 on aggregate and being eliminated. After an irregular year in the local championship, Wanderers achieved a good Closing Tournament, finishing in third place. El Bohemio made sure to qualify for an International Cup for the fifth time in a row.

Copa Sudamericana 2019 – Round of 16. Wanderers is participating in the Copa Sudamericana for the third time, achieving its best classification in this international competition. For the first time the Bohemian participates in an international cup in the Parque Viera. In the first phase, Bohemio eliminated Sport Huancayo from Peru, 3–1 on aggregate. And in the second phase of the Cup, they had to face a Uruguayan rival: Cerro. In the first leg it was a 0–0 tie, winning the return leg 1–0 with a goal from Rodrigo Pastorini. The Bohemian was eliminated in the Round of 16, by the powerful Brazilian Corinthians. It was not a good year for Bohemio in the local tournament, undergoing changes in the technical direction. Part of the championship was directed by Román Cuello (training coach of the club) and then Alfredo Arias returned for the Closing Championship. After 5 consecutive years participating in International Cups, Wanderers fails to enter the cup zone.

In 2020, a very unusual year due to COVID-19, the Opening Tournament was resumed in mid-August. After a promising start, Mauricio Larriera's team had a string of losing games. This caused him to return to the Club of his loves, Daniel Carreño.

== Stadium ==
The club had more than four home grounds during its first 30 years, including Liverpool's current stadium, Estadio Belvedere. Its current home stadium is Estadio Viera located in the Prado neighbourhood of Montevideo.

The Alfredo Víctor Viera Stadium is the stadium of the Wanderers, a Uruguayan football club that plays in the First Division. It was inaugurated on October 15, 1933, as Wanderers Park, at first it had a capacity for 9,500 spectators but after several reforms its capacity remained at 10,000 spectators. However, it does not have adequate capacity to receive international championship matches, such as the Copa Libertadores or Copa Sudamericana, so Wanderers use the Centenario Stadium, since it is municipal property.

In the Prado de Montevideo, there are two other stadiums near Estadio Viera: Parque Saroldi (by River Plate) and the Estadio José Nasazzi Park (of Bella Vista).

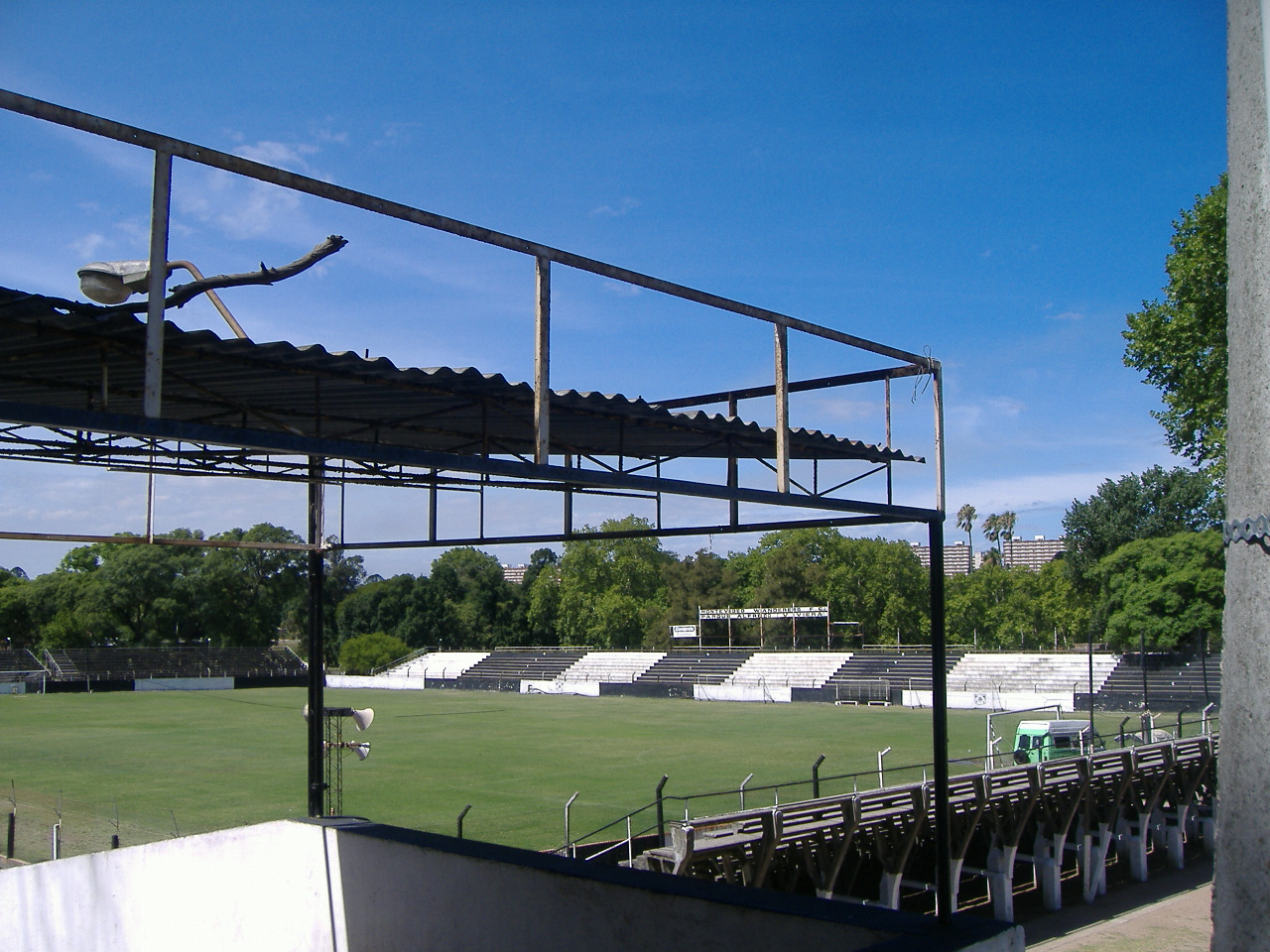
Estadio Alfredo Victor Viera

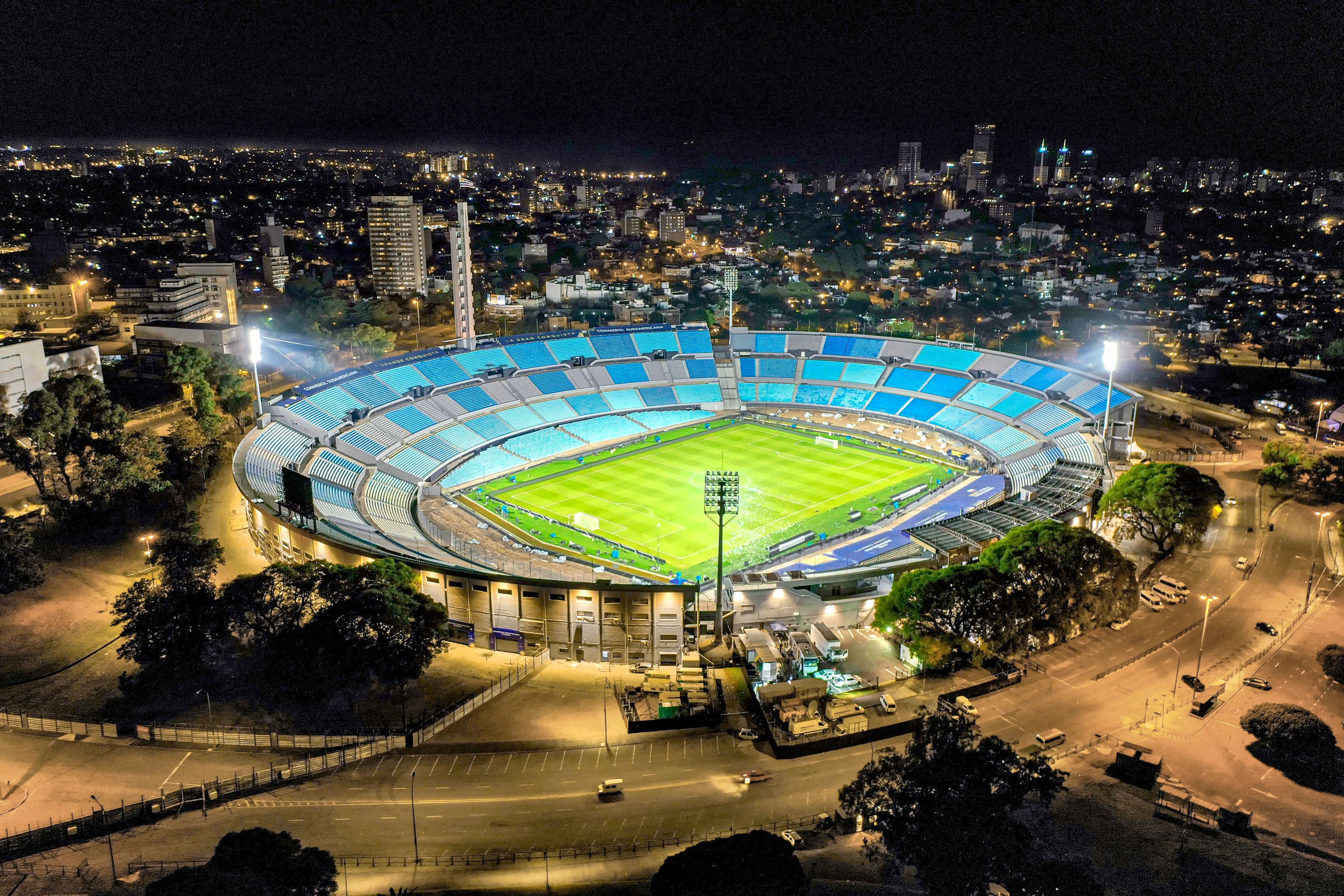
Estadio Centenario

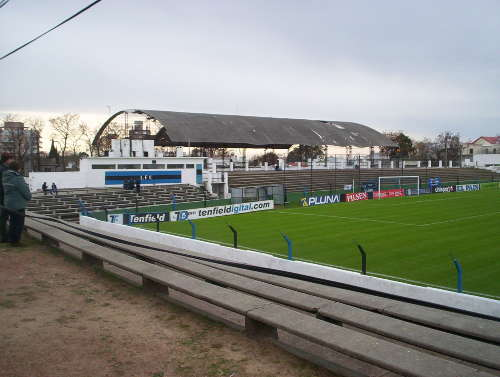
Estadio Belvedere

== Honours ==
=== Senior titles ===
Keys

- Record
- ^{(s)} Shared record

| Type | Competition | Titles | Winning years |
|---|---|---|---|
| National (League) | Primera División | 3 | 1906, 1909, 1931 |
| National (League) | Segunda División | 4 | 1952, 1962, 1972, 2000 |
| Half-year / Short tournament (League) | Torneo Apertura | 1 | 2014 |
| National (Cups) | Liguilla Pre-Libertadores | 2 | 1987, 2001 |
| National (Cups) | Campeonato 75 aniversario C.N.E.F | 1 | 1986 |
| National (Cups) | Torneo Competencia | 2 | 1987, 1990 |
| National (Cups) | Torneo de Honor | 1 | 1937 |
| National (Cups) | Copa de Competencia | 5 | 1906, 1908, 1911, 1917, 1918 |
| National (Cups) | Copa de Honor | 2 | 1908, 1910 |
| International (Cups) | Copa de Honor Cousenier | 1 | 1908 |
| International (Cups) | Tie Cup | 3^{s} | 1911, 1917, 1918 |

== Current squad ==
As of 22 March, 2026

Note: Flags indicate national team as defined under FIFA eligibility rules; some limited exceptions apply. Players may hold more than one non-FIFA nationality.

| No. | Pos. | Nation | Player |
|---|---|---|---|
| 1 | GK | BOL | Gerónimo Govea |
| 2 | DF | URU | Paulo Lima |
| 3 | DF | URU | Guillermo Borthagaray |
| 5 | MF | URU | Nicolás Queiróz |
| 6 | DF | URU | Leandro Zazpe |
| 7 | FW | URU | Rodrigo Rivero |
| 8 | MF | ESP | Sergi Oriol (on loan from Peñarol) |
| 9 | FW | PER | Santiago Ormeño |
| 10 | FW | URU | Luciano Cosentino (long-term injury) |
| 11 | MF | ARG | Jonás Luna |
| 12 | GK | URU | José Río |
| 13 | DF | URU | Fabricio Formiliano |
| 14 | DF | URU | Mateo Acosta |
| 15 | DF | HON | Darlin Mencia (on loan from Real España) |
| 16 | MF | URU | José Alberti |
| 17 | DF | URU | Alan García |

| No. | Pos. | Nation | Player |
|---|---|---|---|
| 18 | DF | ARG | Lisandro Bajú |
| 19 | FW | URU | Roque Ricca |
| 20 | FW | URU | Santiago Guzmán |
| 21 | DF | URU | Santiago Benítez |
| 23 | DF | URU | Nicolás Olivera |
| 25 | MF | URU | Gonzalo Freitas |
| 24 | FW | URU | Joaquín Zeballos |
| 26 | MF | URU | Renzo Sánchez (on loan from Nacional) |
| 29 | FW | URU | Esteban Crucci |
| 30 | FW | URU | Facundo Labandeira |
| 31 | DF | URU | Nahuel Furtado |
| 33 | GK | URU | Agustín Buffa |
| 80 | MF | URU | Jonathan Urretaviscaya |
| — | FW | URU | Mateo Martínez |
| — | FW | URU | Pablo Suárez |

=== Other players under contract ===
Note: Flags indicate national team as defined under FIFA eligibility rules; some limited exceptions apply. Players may hold more than one non-FIFA nationality.

| No. | Pos. | Nation | Player |

== Coaching staff ==
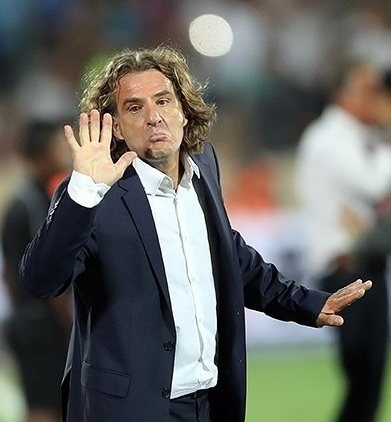
Head coach José Daniel Carreño

Coaching staff
| (Uruguay) José Daniel Carreño | Head coach |
| (Uruguay) Rodrigo Bengua | Assistant coach |
| (Uruguay) Víctor Guala | Goalkeeping coach |
Fitness coaches
| (Uruguay) Guillermo González | Head Fitness Coach |
| (Uruguay) Santiago Mendaña | Fitness coach |
Sport management
| (Uruguay) Mauricio Nanni | Technical director |
Medical department
| (Uruguay) Dr. Nicolás Arrieta | Club doctor |
| (Uruguay) Juan Zaragoza | Physiotherapist |
| (Uruguay) Sebastián Guzman | Kinesiologist |
| (Uruguay) Mathias Álvarez | Nutritionist |

Source: Montevideo Wanderers

=== Managers since 1985 ===
Updated on 22 May 2022

- (Uruguay) Óscar Tabárez (Jan 1, 1985 – Dec 31, 1985)
- (Uruguay) Gregorio Pérez (Jan 1, 1987 – Dec 31, 1987)
- (Uruguay) Daniel Carreño (July 1, 1999 – June 30, 2001)
- (Uruguay) Santiago Ostolaza (Jan 1, 2002 – May 20, 2002)
- (Uruguay) Daniel Carreño (Jan 1, 2005 – Dec 31, 2006)
- (Uruguay) Diego Aguirre (Jan 1, 2007 – June 11, 2007)
- (Uruguay) Jorge Miguel Goncalves (July 1, 2007 – April 15, 2008)
- (Argentina) Salvador Capitano (Jan 1, 2009 – Dec 31, 2009)
- (Argentina) José Alberto Rossi (Dec 16, 2009 – March 15, 2010)
- (Uruguay) Daniel Carreño (March 3, 2010 – Dec 31, 2011)
- (Uruguay) Alfredo Arias (Jan 1, 2012 – Jun 13, 2015)
- (Uruguay) Gastón Machado (Jul 1, 2015 – Dec 31, 2016)
- (Uruguay) Jorge Giordano (Jan 1, 2017 – Dec 31, 2017)
- (Uruguay) Eduardo Espinel (Jan 1, 2018 – Dec 31, 2018)
- (Uruguay) Román Cuello (Jan 1, 2019 – Sep 1, 2019)
- (Uruguay) Alfredo Arias (Sep 2, 2019 – Dec 31, 2019)
- (Uruguay) Mauricio Larriera (Jan 1, 2020 – Oct 12, 2020)
- (Uruguay) José Daniel Carreño (Oct 12, 2020 – )

== Records and statistics ==
Updated on 22 May 2022

=== Player records ===
Most league appearances:

| Rank | Name | Apps |
|---|---|---|
| 1 | (Uruguay) Santiago Martínez | 220 |
| 2 | (Uruguay) Adrián Colombino | 211 |
| 3 | (Uruguay) Diego Riolfo | 181 |
| 4 | (Uruguay) Sergio Blanco | 177 |
| 5 | (Uruguay) Gastón Bueno | 169 |

League top goalscorers:

| Rank | Name | Goals |
|---|---|---|
| 1 | (Uruguay) Sergio Blanco | 85 |
| 2 | (Uruguay) Gastón Rodríguez | 44 |
| 3 | (Uruguay) Rodrigo Pastorini | 33 |
| 4 | (Uruguay) Maxi Rodríguez | 29 |
| 5 | (Uruguay) Diego Riolfo | 23 |

== Club personnel ==
Updated on 22 May 2022

Board of Directors

President: Gabriel Blanco
Vice President: Jorge Perazzo
Secretary: Jorge Cruces
Pro Secretary: Santiago Cassarino, Francisco Nopitsch
Treasurer: Diego Perazzo
Board Member: Daniel Supervielle, Jorge Nin, Marcelo Liard, Jorge Barrios, José Nuñez

Tax commission

Physical: Luis Abud, Juan Pablo Paradiso, Jorge Carve

Work commission

Contract commission: Diego Perazzo, Sebastián García, Gabriel Blanco
Formative Divisions Commission: Jorge Cruces, Francisco Terra, Rodrigo Alonso, Jorge Barrios
Marketing Commission: Carlos Ham, Germán Barcala, Enzo Bossano, Francisco Nopitsch
Works commission: Carlos Ham, Humberto Ceretta, Agustín Nopitsch, Jorge Barrios
Social commission: Fernando González, Daniel Supervielle
AUF delegates: Carlos Ham, Gastón Inda, Fernando Nopitsch
Press secretary: Gonzalo Duarte
Internal relationship commission: Gabriel Tapia, Alejandro Chans, Sebastián Rubino
AUFI support commission: Natalia Plavan, Rodrigo Alonso, Jorge Barrios
Women's Football commission: Natalia Plavan
Fan liaison officer: Daniel Cabrera
Security officer: Marcelo Liard, Juan Pablo Paradiso

Staff

General manager: Sebastián Garcia
Sports Manager: Mauricio Nanni
Training Divisions Coordinator: Santiago Ostolaza
Accounting assistant: Diego Boggio
Management: Leandro Mariño, Martina González
Photography: Fernando Romero
Graphic design: Ramón Davila

Source: Montevideo Wanderers F.C.
