= Chelle =

Chelle is a surname. Notable people with the surname include:

- Éric Chelle (born 1977), Malian footballer
- Ludovic Chelle (born 1983), Malian-French basketball player
- Nelson Chelle (1931–2001), Uruguayan basketball player
- Oscar Chelle (born 1922), Uruguayan footballer
