= Juan Guerra =

Juan Guerra may refer to:

- Juan Guerra Guerra (1897–1973), Chilean miner and politician
- Juan Nepomuceno Guerra (1915–2001), Mexican organized crime figure
- Juan Guerra (footballer, born 1927), Bolivian footballer
- Juan Carlos Guerra Zunzunegui (1935–2020), Spanish politician
- Juan Nicasio Guerra (born 1954), Mexican politician
- Juan Luis Guerra (born 1957), Dominican popular singer
- Juan Guerra (footballer, born 1987), Venezuelan footballer
- Juan Guerra (footballer, born 1991), Spanish footballer

== Places ==
- Juan Guerra District, in the Peruvian province of San Martín
