= Ernesto Gutiérrez =

Argentine footballer (1927–2006)

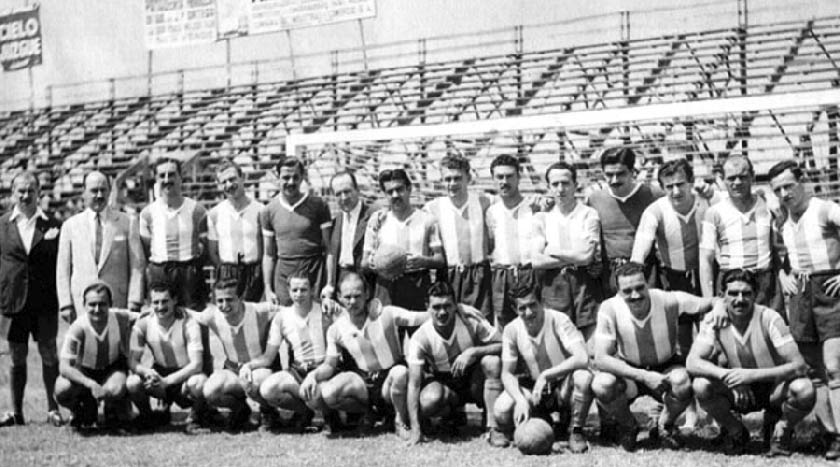

Personal information
- Date of birth: 9 November 1927
- Date of death: 9 December 2006 (aged 79)
- Position: Midfielder

International career
Years	Team	Apps	(Gls)
1947–1956	Argentina	22	(0)

Ernesto Gutiérrez (9 November 1927 – 9 December 2006) was an Argentine footballer. He played in 22 matches for the Argentina national football team from 1947 to 1956. He was also part of Argentina's squad for the 1947 South American Championship.
