= Camilo Cerviño =

Argentine footballer (1928–2017)

Camilo Rodolfo Cervino Esposito
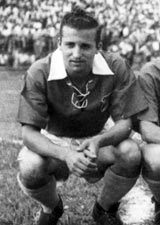

Personal information
- Date of birth: 20 March 1927
- Date of death: 15 November 2017 (aged 90)
- Place of death: Cali, Colombia
- Position: Forward

International career
Years	Team	Apps	(Gls)
1947	Argentina	1	(0)

Camilo Cervino (20 March 1927 – 15 November 2017) was an Argentine footballer. He played in one match for the Argentina national football team in 1947. He was also part of Argentina's squad for the 1947 South American Championship.

== Honours ==
Independiente

- Argentine Primera División: 1948

Argentina

- Copa América: 1947
