= Juan Carlos Colmán =

Argentine footballer

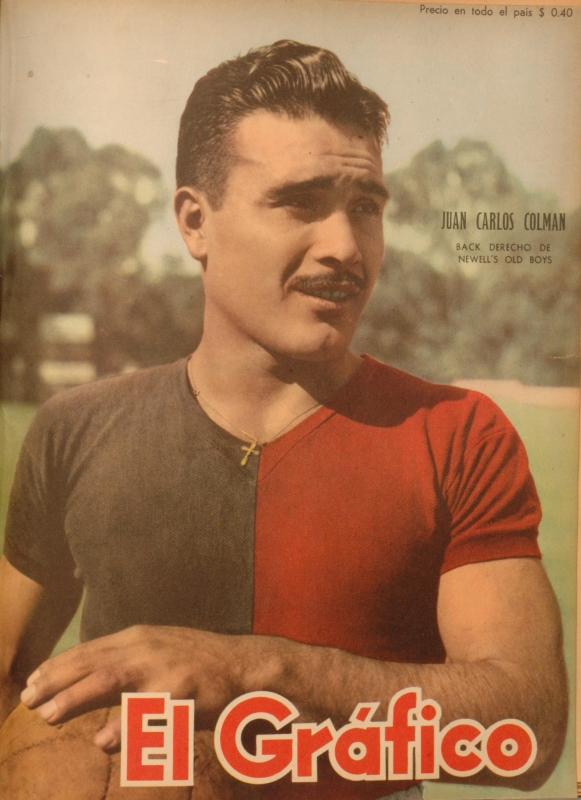

Personal information
- Date of birth: 15 December 1922
- Place of birth: Concordia, Entre Ríos, Argentina
- Date of death: 21 September 1999 (aged 76)

International career
Years	Team	Apps	(Gls)
1947–1956	Argentina	13	(0)

Juan Carlos Colmán (15 December 1922 – 21 September 1999) was an Argentine footballer. He played in 13 matches for the Argentina national football team from 1947 to 1956. He was also part of Argentina's squad for the 1947 South American Championship.

== Honours ==
Boca Juniors

- Argentine Primera División: 1954

Argentina

- South American Championship: 1947, 1955
