= Luis Suárez (Peruvian footballer) =

Peruvian footballer (1926–2014)

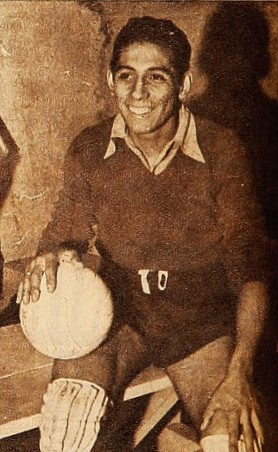
- Suárez in 1948

Personal information
- Full name: Luis Oswaldo Suárez Cáceres
- Date of birth: 17 May 1926
- Place of birth: Lima, Peru
- Date of death: 7 August 2014 (aged 88)
- Position: Goalkeeper

Youth career
- 1941–1945: Yoque Yupanqui

Senior career*
Years	Team	Apps	(Gls)
1945–1952	Deportivo Municipal		
1953–1957	Mariscal Sucre		
1958–1959	Ciclista Lima		
1960	Centro Iqueño		
1961–1962	Ciclista Lima		
1963	Centro Iqueño		

International career
1947–1955	Peru	13	(0)
- * Club domestic league appearances and goals

Luis Oswaldo Suárez Cáceres (17 May 1926 – 7 August 2014) was a Peruvian professional footballer who played as goalkeeper.

== Club career ==
Nicknamed El Flaco (the skinny), Luis Suárez Cáceres joined Lloque Yupanqui, a neighborhood team in the Jesús María district of Lima, at a very young age in 1941. Spotted by Luis Guzmán, an iconic player for Deportivo Municipal in 1945, he signed with the latter club. Initially Juan Chao Busanich's backup, he took advantage of the latter's departure for Argentina to become the starting goalkeeper. He finished as runner-up in the Peruvian league three times consecutively from 1945 to 1947. He maintained his starting position to such an extent that Busanich, upon returning from Argentina, was forced to leave for Universitario de Deportes.

With Deportivo Municipal, he made a name for himself and faced some of the most famous Peruvian strikers of the 1940s and 1950s, including Teodoro Fernández and Valeriano López. In 1950, he won his first Peruvian championship under Juan Valdivieso, and the following year he finished as runner-up.

In 1952, he signed with Mariscal Sucre, the club with which he won his second championship in 1953 under Carlos Iturrizaga. He remained with the club until 1957, a season in which he served as both player-manager and coach.

In 1958, he moved to Ciclista Lima, then continued his career at Centro Iqueño in 1960, the last club where he ended his career in 1963, after a brief return to Ciclista Lima between 1961 and 1962.

== International career ==
Luis Suárez Cáceres participated in the 1947 South American Championship in Ecuador, a competition where he made his debut for the national team, alternating with Rafael Asca.

He returned to the national team for the 1955 South American Championship in Chile. This would be his last appearance for the Peruvian national team, where he earned 13 caps between 1947 and 1955 (conceding 21 goals).

== Post-football and death ==
Doctor by profession, Luis Suárez Cáceres dedicated himself to his profession before entering politics. He became mayor of the San Juan de Lurigancho district in Lima in 1970, and then again between 1996 and 1998. He died on 7 August 2014.

== Honours ==
Deportivo Municipal

- Peruvian Primera División: 1950

Mariscal Sucre

- Peruvian Primera División: 1953
