= Andrés da Silva =

Peruvian footballer (1921–1994)

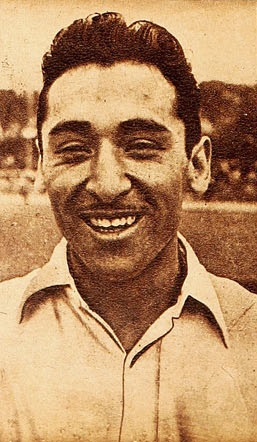

Personal information
- Full name: Andrés da Silva Vega
- Date of birth: 21 March 1921
- Place of birth: Callao, Peru
- Date of death: 21 March 1994 (aged 73)
- Height: 1.75 m (5 ft 9 in)
- Position: Defender

Senior career*
Years	Team	Apps	(Gls)
1942–1943	Sport Boys	18	(0)
1944–1955	Universitario	155	(?)

International career
1947–1949	Peru	9	(0)
- * Club domestic league appearances and goals

Andrés da Silva Vega (21 March 1921 – 21 March 1994) was a Peruvian professional footballer who played as defender.

== Playing career ==
=== Club career ===
Nicknamed El Mariscal (the Marshal), Andrés da Silva is one of the emblematic figures of Universitario de Deportes, where he played 155 matches between 1944 and 1955 and won three Peruvian championships in 1945, 1946, and 1949. He had, however, begun his career with Sport Boys in 1942, the year he won his first Peruvian championship before transferring to Universitario in 1944 for 1,200 soles.

He ended his career with Universitario in 1955 following an injury caused by a collision with Sport Boys striker Jorge Lama, from which he never recovered.

=== International career ===
A Peruvian international from 1947 to 1949, Andrés da Silva played nine matches (without scoring a goal) for the national team, including three in the 1947 South American Championship in Ecuador and six in the 1949 tournament in Brazil. He and his team finished third in the latter tournament.

== Honours ==
Sport Boys

- Peruvian Primera División: 1942

Universitario de Deportes

- Peruvian Primera División (3): 1945, 1946, 1949
