= Juan Manuel Acuña =

Chilean footballer (1921–1989)

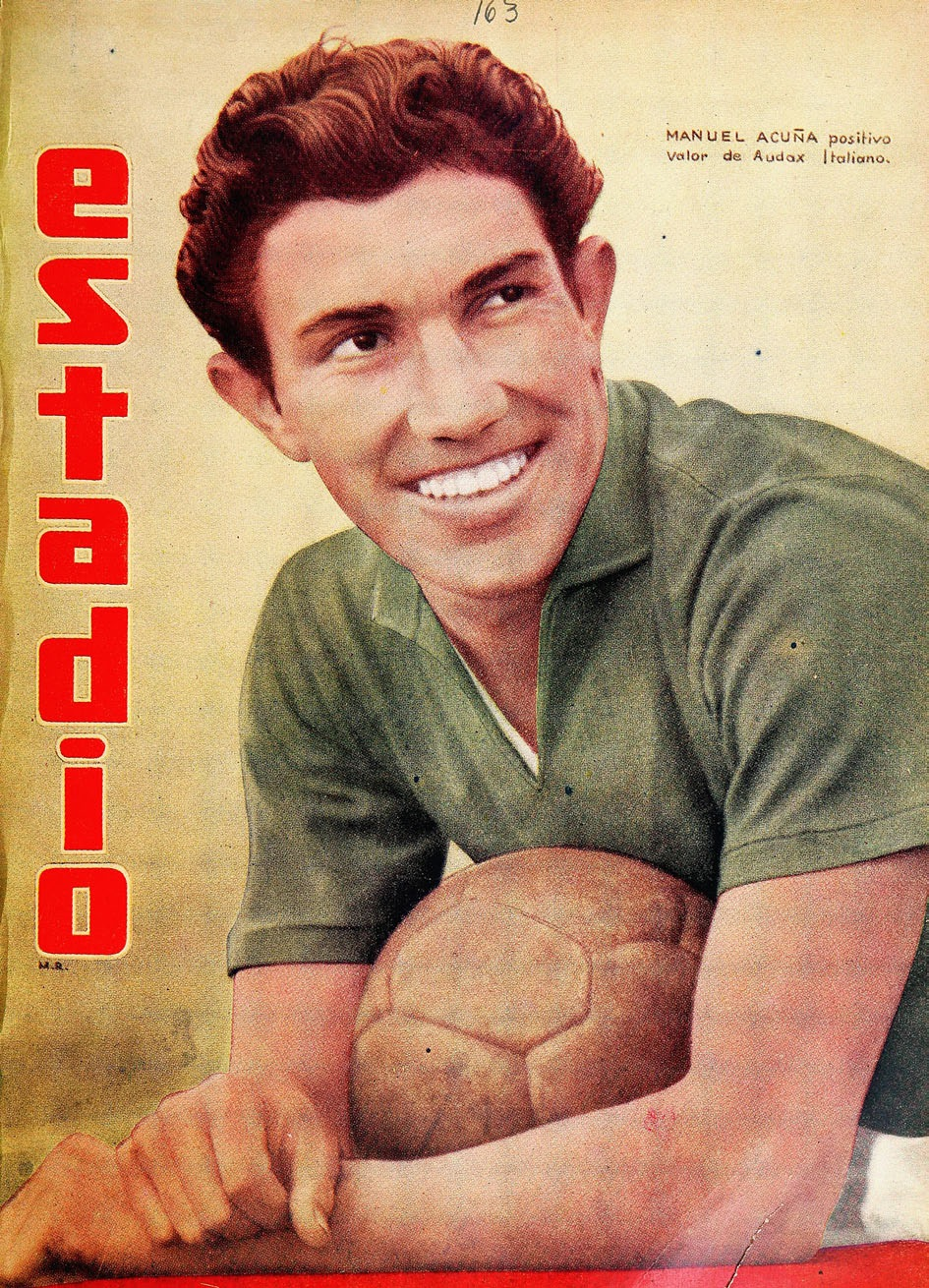

Personal information
- Full name: Juan Manuel Acuña Romero
- Date of birth: 16 October 1921
- Date of death: 5 December 1989 (aged 68)
- Position: Midfielder

International career
Years	Team	Apps	(Gls)
1947	Chile	6	(0)

Juan Manuel Acuña Romero (16 October 1921 – 5 December 1989) was a Chilean footballer. He played in six matches for the Chile national football team in 1947. He was also part of Chile's squad for the 1947 South American Championship.
