= Manuel Machuca =

Chilean footballer (1924-1985)

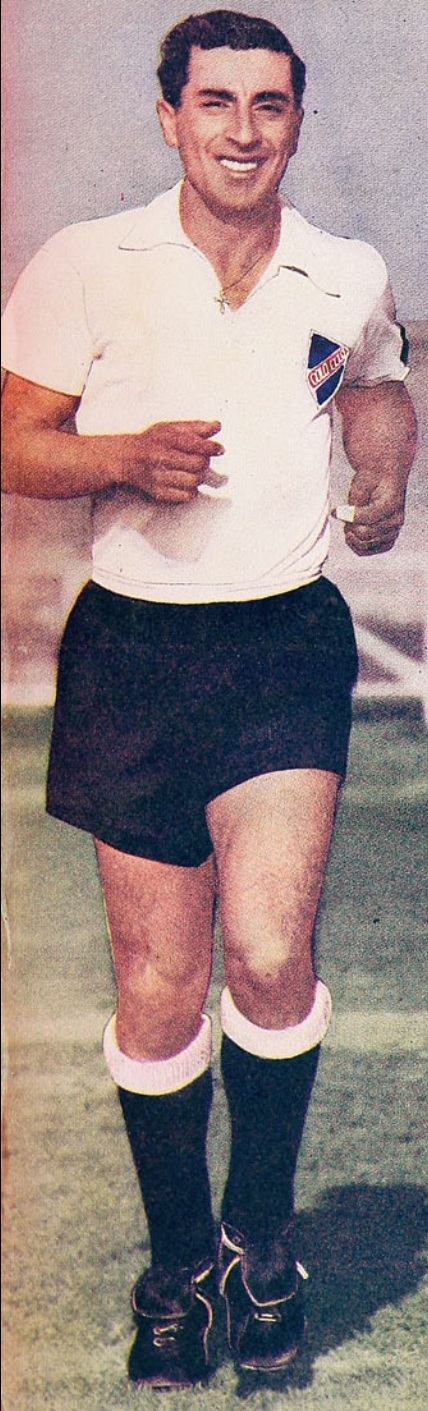

Personal information
- Full name: Manuel Hernán Machuca Berríos
- Date of birth: 6 June 1924
- Place of birth: Santiago, Chile
- Date of death: c. 27 February 1985 (aged 60)
- Place of death: Santiago, Chile
- Position: Defender

Youth career
- Colo-Colo

Senior career*
Years	Team	Apps	(Gls)
1946–1951	Colo-Colo		
1952	Green Cross		

International career
1947-1950	Chile	19	
- * Club domestic league appearances and goals

Manuel Hernán Machuca Berríos (6 June 1924 – c. 27 February 1985) was a Chilean football defender who played for Chile in the 1950 FIFA World Cup.

== Career ==
Born in Santiago, he spent almost all his career playing for Colo-Colo. In 1952, he also played for Green Cross.
