= Benjamin Maldonado =

Bolivian footballer (born 1928)

Benjamín Maldonado
Personal information
- Date of birth: 13 May 1928
- Place of birth: Cochabamba, Bolivia
- Position: Forward

Senior career*
Years	Team	Apps	(Gls)
- San José

International career
- Bolivia
- * Club domestic league appearances and goals

Benjamín Maldonado (born 13 May 1928, date of death unknown) was a Bolivian football forward who played for Bolivia in the 1950 FIFA World Cup. He also played for Club Deportivo San José. Maldonado is deceased.
