= Eduardo Gutiérrez (footballer) =

Bolivian footballer (born 1925)

Personal information
- Full name: Eduardo Gutiérrez Valdivia
- Date of birth: 17 January 1925
- Place of birth: Cochabamba, Bolivia
- Height: 1.76 m (5 ft 9 in)
- Position: Goalkeeper

Senior career*
Years	Team	Apps	(Gls)
1947–1948	Ingavi		
1949	Always Ready		
1950–1953	Ingavi		

International career
1947–1953	Bolivia	20	(0)
- * Club domestic league appearances and goals

Eduardo Gutiérrez Valdivia (born 17 January 1925, date of death unknown) was a Bolivian football goalkeeper who played for Bolivia in the 1950 FIFA World Cup. Gutiérrez is deceased.

== Career ==
Gutiérrez played at the 1949 South American Championship and earned 20 caps between 1947 and 1953. He also played for CD Ingavi and Always Ready La Paz.
