= Nicolás Falero =

Uruguayan footballer (1921–1986)

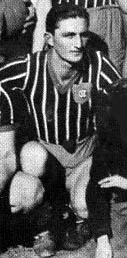
- Falero with Central Español in 1944

Personal information
- Date of birth: 11 January 1921
- Place of birth: Montevideo, Uruguay
- Date of death: 1986 (aged 64–65)
- Position: Forward

International career
Years	Team	Apps	(Gls)
1945–1948	Uruguay	12	(12)

Nicolás Falero (11 January 1921 – 1986) was a Uruguayan footballer. He played in twelve matches for the Uruguay national football team from 1945 to 1948. He was part of Uruguay's squad for the 1945 South American Championship. With 8 goals, he was the top scorer at the 1947 South American Championship though Uruguay finished third behind both Paraguay and Argentina
