= Carlos Varela (Chilean footballer) =

Chilean footballer (1918–1964)

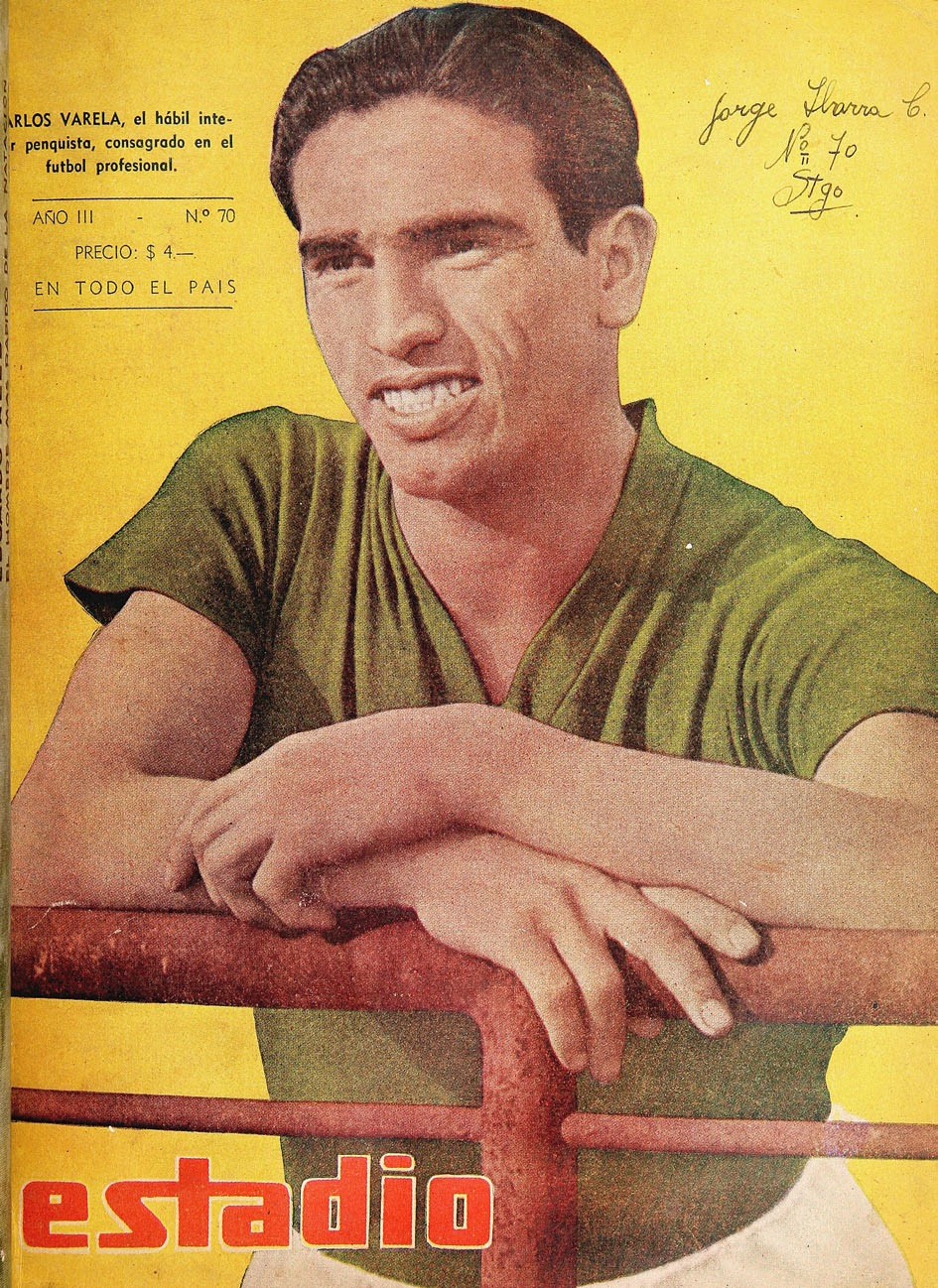
- Varela in 1944

Personal information
- Full name: Carlos Varela Aguirre
- Date of birth: 2 January 1918
- Date of death: 8 September 1964 (aged 46)
- Position: Forward

International career
Years	Team	Apps	(Gls)
1945–1949	Chile	12	(1)

Carlos Varela Aguirre (2 January 1918 – 8 September 1964) was a Chilean footballer. He played in twelve matches for the Chile national football team from 1945 to 1949. He was also part of Chile's squad for the 1947 South American Championship.
