= Leocadio Marín =

Spanish politician (1942–2024)

Mayor of Baeza
- In office 16 June 2007 – 13 June 2015
- Preceded by: Javier Calvente Gallego
- Succeeded by: María Dolores Marín Torres

Minister of Agriculture and Fisheries of Andalusia
- In office 27 July 1990 – 22 December 1993
- Preceded by: Miguel Manaute Humanes
- Succeeded by: Luis Planas

Personal details
- Born: Leocadio Marín Rodríguez; 10 November 1942 Baeza, Spain
- Died: 21 May 2024 (aged 81) Baeza, Spain
- Party: PSOE
- Education: University of Granada
- Occupation: Schoolteacher

Leocadio Marín Rodríguez (10 November 1942 – 21 May 2024) was a Spanish schoolteacher and politician. A member of the Spanish Socialist Workers' Party, he served as Minister of Agriculture and Fisheries of Andalusia from 1990 to 1993 and was mayor of Baeza from 2007 to 2015.

Marín died in Baeza on 21 May 2024, at the age of 81.
