= Fernando Campos =

Chilean footballer (1923-2004)

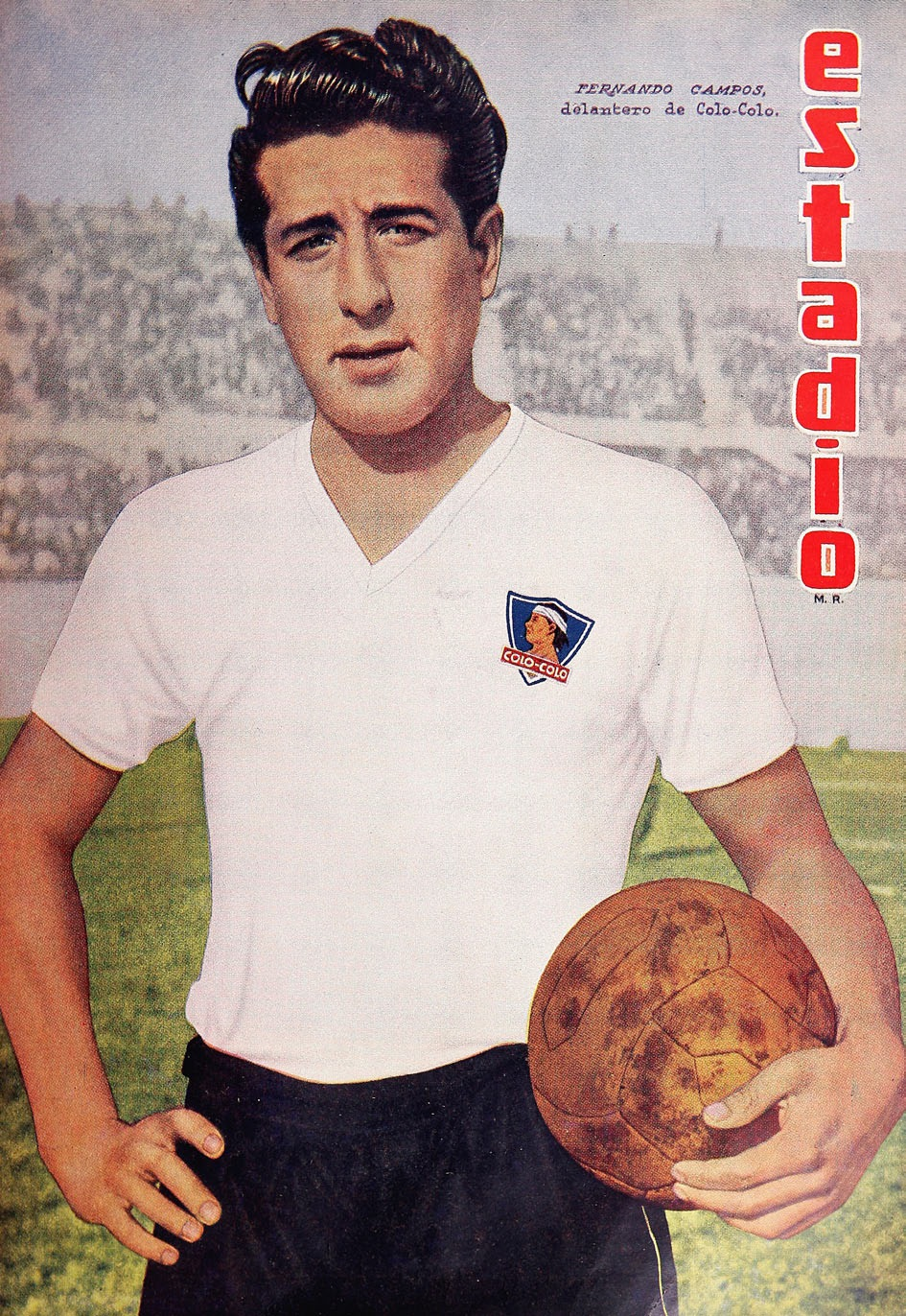

Personal information
- Full name: Fernando Campos Quiroz
- Date of birth: 15 October 1923
- Date of death: 14 September 2004 (aged 80)
- Position: Midfielder

Senior career*
Years	Team	Apps	(Gls)
- Colo-Colo

International career
1947-1950	Chile	5	(3)
- * Club domestic league appearances and goals

Fernando Campos Quiroz (15 October 1923 – 14 September 2004) was a Chilean football midfielder who played for Chile in the 1950 FIFA World Cup. He also played for Colo-Colo, a Chilean football club.
