= Juan Negri =

Chilean footballer (1925-2015)

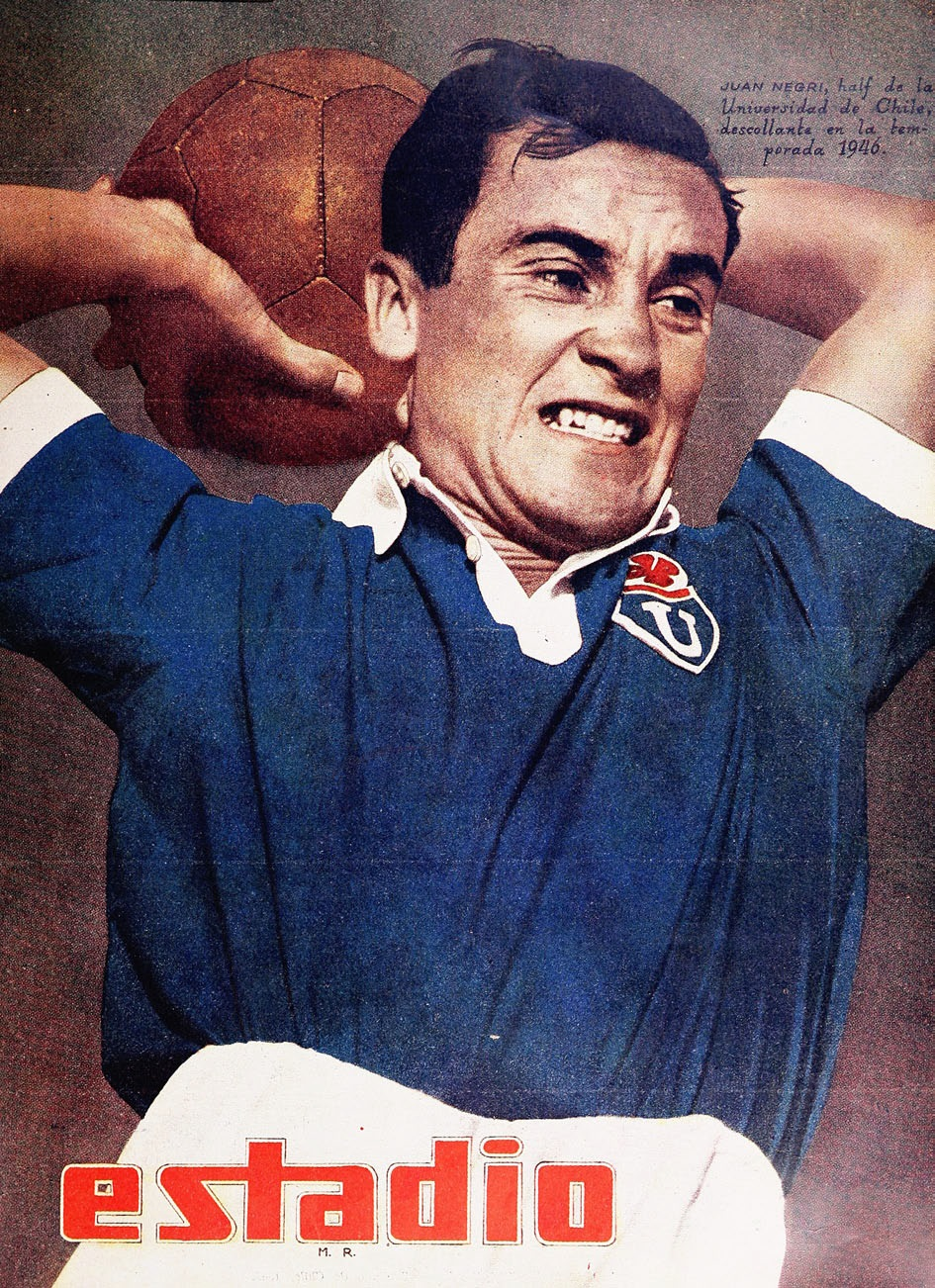

Personal information
- Date of birth: 5 January 1925
- Date of death: 20 October 2015 (aged 90)
- Position: Defender

International career
Years	Team	Apps	(Gls)
1950	Chile	3	(0)

Juan Negri (5 January 1925 – 20 October 2015) was a Chilean footballer. He played in three matches for the Chile national football team in 1950. He was also part of Chile's squad for the 1949 South American Championship.
