= Nicolás Olivera (footballer, born 1993) =

Uruguayan footballer

Personal information
- Full name: Luis Nicolás Olivera Moreira
- Date of birth: 17 February 1993 (age 33)
- Place of birth: Melo, Uruguay
- Height: 1.93 m (6 ft 4 in)
- Position: Centre-back

Team information
- Current team: River Plate Montevideo
- Number: 23

Youth career
- 2006–2007: Boca Juniors Melo
- 2007–2014: Nacional

Senior career*
Years	Team	Apps	(Gls)
2012–2015	Nacional	1	(0)
2014	→ Rampla Juniors (loan)	0	(0)
2015–2016	Villa Teresa	10	(1)
2016–2017	Estudiantes SL	16	(1)
2018–2019	Fénix	44	(3)
2019	→ Deportivo Santaní (loan)	20	(0)
2020	Deportivo Maldonado	14	(0)
2021	Plaza Colonia	25	(0)
2022	Cusco FC	0	(0)
2022	Carlos A. Mannucci	32	(0)
2023	Plaza Colonia	29	(2)
2024	Deportes Temuco	4	(0)
2024–	River Plate Montevideo	1	(0)
- * Club domestic league appearances and goals as of 19 July 2024

Luis Nicolás Olivera Moreira (born 17 February 1993), known as Nicolás Olivera, is a Uruguayan footballer who plays as a centre-back for River Plate Montevideo.

== Club career ==
Born in Melo, Cerro Largo, Uruguay, Olivera is a product of Nacional. In the second half of 2014, he was on loan with Rampla Juniors.

After ending his contract with Nacional, he switched to Villa Teresa in July 2015. The next year, he had his first experience abroad by signing with Estudiantes de San Luis in the Argentine Primera B Nacional.

Back in Uruguay, he joined Fénix in 2018. In January 2019, he was loaned out to Paraguayan club Deportivo Santaní.

In 2020 and 2021, Olivera played for Deportivo Maldonado and Plaza Colonia, respectively.

In December 2021, he moved abroad again and signed with Peruvian club Cusco FC for the 2022 season. After Cusco FC were relegated to the second level, he became a free agent and switched to Carlos A. Mannucci.

After playing for Plaza Colonia in 2023, he moved abroad by fourth time and joined Deportes Temuco in January 2024. He left them in July of the same year.
