= Mario Fernández (footballer, born 1922) =

Argentine footballer

Personal information
- Date of birth: 26 January 1922
- Place of birth: Buenos Aires, Argentina
- Position: Forward

International career
Years	Team	Apps	(Gls)
1947	Argentina	3	(1)

Mario Fernández (born 26 January 1922) was an Argentine footballer. He played in three matches for the Argentina national football team in 1947. He was also part of Argentina's squad for the 1947 South American Championship.
