= Oscar Chelle =

Uruguayan footballer (born 1922)

Personal information
- Date of birth: 19 February 1922
- Position: Midfielder

International career
Years	Team	Apps	(Gls)
1947	Uruguay	1	(0)

Oscar Chelle (born 19 February 1922) was a Uruguayan footballer. He played in one match for the Uruguay national football team in 1947. He was also part of Uruguay's squad for the 1947 South American Championship.
