= Duberty Aráoz =

Bolivian footballer

Personal information
- Full name: Duberto Aráoz
- Date of birth: 21 December 1920
- Place of birth: Bolivia
- Position: Midfielder

Senior career*
| Years | Team | Apps | (Gls) |
- Club Litoral

International career
- Bolivia
- * Club domestic league appearances and goals

Duberty Aráoz, also spelled Duberto Aráoz (born 21 December 1920, date of death unknown) was a Bolivian football midfielder who played for Bolivia in the 1950 FIFA World Cup. He also played for Club Litoral. Aráoz is deceased.
