= Rafael Asca =

Peruvian footballer (1924–2017)

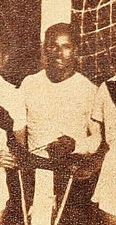
- Asca in 1947

Personal information
- Full name: Santiago Rafael Asca Palomino
- Date of birth: 24 October 1924
- Place of birth: Lima, Peru
- Date of death: 8 October 2017 (aged 92)
- Position: Goalkeeper

Youth career
- San Lorenzo (Callao)

Senior career*
Years	Team	Apps	(Gls)
1945–1951	Sport Boys		
1952–1955	Sporting Tabaco		
1956–1963	Sporting Cristal		

International career
1947–1959	Peru	21	(0)
- * Club domestic league appearances and goals

Santiago Rafael Asca Palomino (24 October 1924 – 8 October 2017), commonly known as Rafael Asca, was a Peruvian professional footballer who played as goalkeeper.

He is considered one of the most iconic goalkeepers of Peru in the 1950s.

== Playing career ==
=== Club career ===
Rafael Asca joined Sport Boys in 1945. He remained there for seven seasons and won the Peruvian championship in 1951, the first championship of the professional era.

The following year, he played for Sporting Tabaco, a club that became Sporting Cristal in 1956, retaining most of the Sporting Tabaco players, including Rafael Asca. That same year, he won his second championship, followed by a third title in 1961. He retired from playing two years later.

Asca was briefly interim coach of Sporting Cristal in 1974.

=== International career ===
Rafael Asca participated in four South American football championships in 1947, 1953, 1957 and 1959. He earned 21 caps for the Peruvian national team between 1947 and 1959 (conceding 27 goals). He was part of the team for the 1959 South American Championship tournament.

== Death ==
Rafael Asca died on October 17, 2017 at the age of 92.

== Honours ==
Sport Boys

- Peruvian Primera División: 1951

Sporting Cristal

- Peruvian Primera División (2): 1956, 1961
