= Héctor Magliano =

Uruguayan footballer

Personal information
- Date of birth: 30 November 1919
- Position: Forward

International career
Years	Team	Apps	(Gls)
1940–1947	Uruguay	13	(5)

Héctor Magliano (born 30 November 1919, date of death unknown) was a Uruguayan footballer. He played in three matches for the Uruguay national football team from 1940 to 1947. He was also part of Uruguay's squad for the 1941 South American Championship.
