= Osvaldo Sáez =

Chilean footballer (1920-1959)

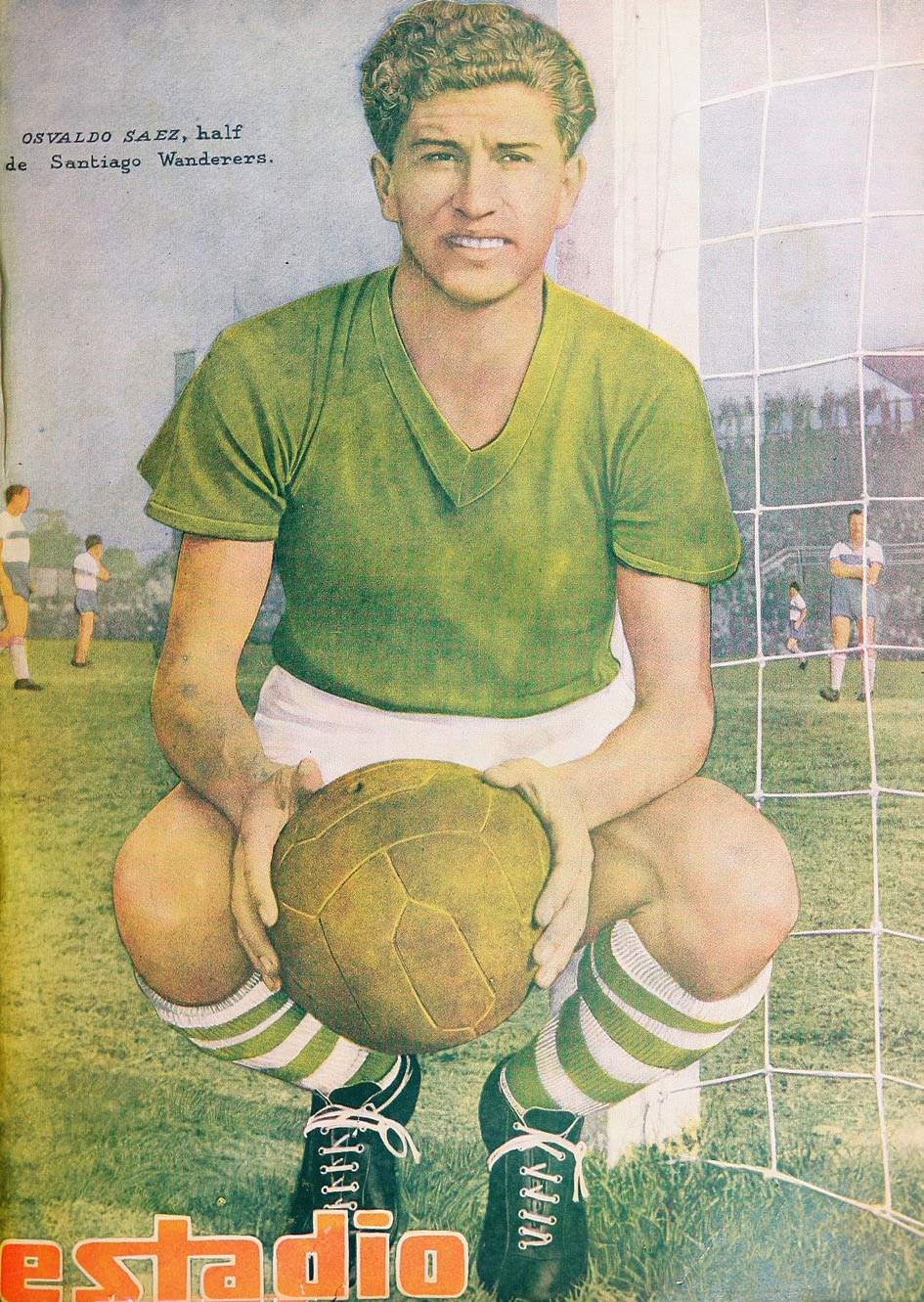
- Osvaldo Sáez in 1949

Personal information
- Full name: Osvaldo Sáez Álvarez
- Date of birth: 29 December 1920
- Place of birth: Chile
- Date of death: 9 July 1959 (aged 38)
- Position: Midfielder

Senior career*
Years	Team	Apps	(Gls)
- Colo-Colo

International career
1946-1954	Chile	22	(4)
- * Club domestic league appearances and goals

Osvaldo Tomás Sáez Álvarez (29 December 1920 – 9 July 1959) was a Chilean football midfielder who played for Chile in the 1950 FIFA World Cup. He also played for Colo-Colo.
