= Juan Guerra (footballer, born 1927) =

Bolivian footballer (born 1927)

Personal information
- Date of birth: 13 April 1927
- Place of birth: La Paz, Bolivia
- Position: Defender

Senior career*
Years	Team	Apps	(Gls)
- Ferroviario La Paz

International career
- Bolivia
- * Club domestic league appearances and goals

Juan Guerra (born 13 April 1927, date of death unknown) was a Bolivian footballer who played as a defender for Bolivia in the 1950 FIFA World Cup. Guerra is deceased.

== Club career ==
Guerra also played for Ferroviario La Paz.
