= 1947 South American Championship =

Football tournament

Tournament details
- Host country: Ecuador
- Dates: 30 November – 31 December
- Teams: 8 (from 1 confederation)
- Venue: 1 (in 1 host city)

Final positions
- Champions: Argentina (9th title)
- Runners-up: Paraguay
- Third place: Uruguay
- Fourth place: Chile

Tournament statistics
- Matches played: 28
- Goals scored: 102 (3.64 per match)
- Top scorer(s): (Uruguay) Nicolás Falero (8 goals)

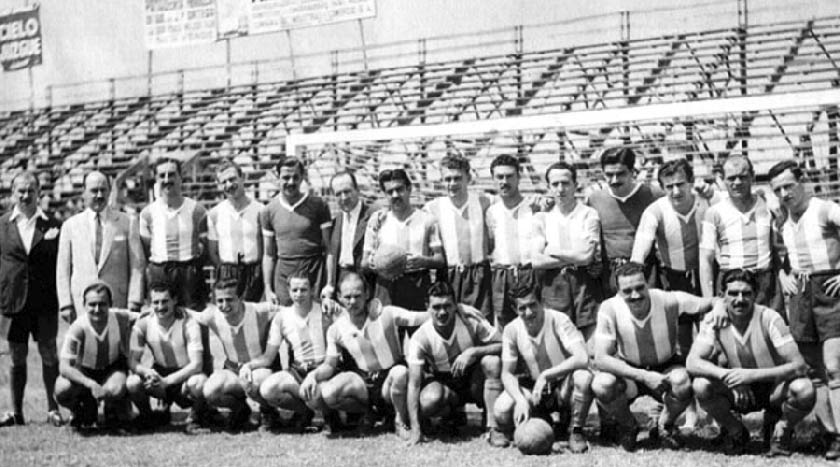
Argentina won its ninth title

The 1947 South American Championship was the 20th South American Championship for national teams, and was organized by CONMEBOL. It marked the first time Ecuador hosted the tournament, which hosted all the matches in Estadio George Capwell in Guayaquil. Argentina won the tournament to obtain their ninth South American title.

Brazil withdrew from the tournament.

== Format ==
Each team played the teams in a single round-robin tournament, earning two points for a win, one point for a draw, and zero points for a loss. The team with the most points at the end of the tournament will be crowned the champions.

== Squads ==
For a complete list of participating squads see: 1947 South American Championship squads

== Venues ==
Guayaquil
Estadio George Capwell
Capacity: 10,000
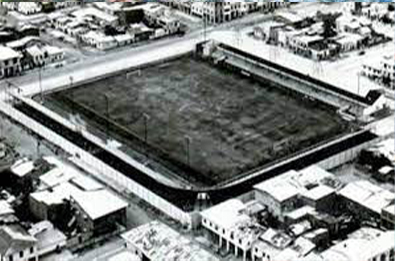

== Final round ==
| Team | Pld | W | D | L | GF | GA | GD | Pts |
|---|---|---|---|---|---|---|---|---|
| Argentina | 7 | 6 | 1 | 0 | 28 | 4 | +24 | 13 |
| Paraguay | 7 | 5 | 1 | 1 | 16 | 11 | +5 | 11 |
| Uruguay | 7 | 5 | 0 | 2 | 21 | 8 | +13 | 10 |
| Chile | 7 | 4 | 1 | 2 | 14 | 13 | +1 | 9 |
| Peru | 7 | 2 | 2 | 3 | 12 | 9 | +3 | 6 |
| Ecuador | 7 | 0 | 3 | 4 | 3 | 17 | −14 | 3 |
| Bolivia | 7 | 0 | 2 | 5 | 6 | 21 | −15 | 2 |
| Colombia | 7 | 0 | 2 | 5 | 2 | 19 | −17 | 2 |

30 November 1947

| Ecuador | 2–2 | Bolivia |
|---|---|---|
| Jiménez 1', 24' | | Gutiérrez 26', 44' |

Estadio George Capwell, Guayaquil
Attendance: 30,000
Referee: Luis Alberto Fernández (Uruguay)

2 December 1947

| Uruguay | 2–0 | Colombia |
|---|---|---|
| Falero 26'; Britos 61' |

Estadio George Capwell, Guayaquil
Attendance: 20,000
Referee: Juan José Álvarez (Argentina)

2 December 1947

| Argentina | 6–0 | Paraguay |
|---|---|---|
| Moreno 10'; Loustau 22'; Pontoni 40', 50', 82'; Méndez 87' |

Estadio George Capwell, Guayaquil
Attendance: 20,000
Referee: Víctor Francisco Rivas (Chile)

4 December 1947

| Argentina | 7–0 | Bolivia |
|---|---|---|
| Méndez 3', 44'; Pontoni 22'; Loustau 56'; Boyé 58', 76'; Di Stéfano 62' |

Estadio George Capwell, Guayaquil
Attendance: 20,000
Referee: Federico Muñoz Medina (Ecuador)

4 December 1947

| Colombia | 0–0 | Ecuador |

Estadio George Capwell, Guayaquil
Attendance: 30,000
Referee: Mario Rubén Hayn (Paraguay)

6 December 1947

| Peru | 2–2 | Paraguay |
|---|---|---|
| Castillo 17'; Mosquera 63' | | Villalba 38'; Marín 74' |

Estadio George Capwell, Guayaquil
Attendance: 20,000
Referee: Luis Alberto Fernández (Uruguay)

6 December 1947

| Uruguay | 6–0 | Chile |
|---|---|---|
| Sarro 9'; Falero 39', 42'; Gambetta 68'; Magliano 88', 89' |

Estadio George Capwell, Guayaquil
Attendance: 20,000
Referee: Juan José Álvarez (Argentina)

9 December 1947

| Chile | 2–1 | Peru |
|---|---|---|
| Varela 25'; Busquets 71' | | López 72' |

Estadio George Capwell, Guayaquil
Attendance: 15,000
Referee: Juan José Álvarez (Argentina)

9 December 1947

| Uruguay | 3–0 | Bolivia |
|---|---|---|
| Magliano 9'; Falero 50', 79' |

Estadio George Capwell, Guayaquil
Attendance: 15,000
Referee: Mario Rubén Heyn (Paraguay)

11 December 1947

| Chile | 3–0 | Ecuador |
|---|---|---|
| Peñaloza 51'; López 62', 72' |

Estadio George Capwell, Guayaquil
Attendance: 22,000
Referee: Juan José Álvarez (Argentina)

11 December 1947

| Argentina | 3–2 | Peru |
|---|---|---|
| Moreno 41'; Di Stefano 55'; Boyé 56' | | Gómez Sánchez 25'; López 65' (red card); Torres (red card) |

Estadio George Capwell, Guayaquil
Attendance: 22,000
Referee: Luis Alberto Fernández (Uruguay)

13 December 1947

| Colombia | 0–0 | Bolivia |

Estadio George Capwell, Guayaquil
Attendance: 18,000
Referee: Luis Alberto Fernández (Uruguay)

13 December 1947

| Paraguay | 4–2 | Uruguay |
|---|---|---|
| Genés 52', 79'; Marín 76'; Villalba 89' | | Magliano 3'; Britos 47' |

Estadio George Capwell, Guayaquil
Attendance: 18,000
Referee: Juan José Álvarez (Argentina)

16 December 1947

| Uruguay | 6–1 | Ecuador |
|---|---|---|
| Falero 19', 21'; Puente 24', 88'; García 28'; Sarro 35' | | Garnica 51' |

Estadio George Capwell, Guayaquil
Attendance: 30,000
Referee: Victor Francisco Rivas (Chile)

16 December 1947

| Argentina | 1–1 | Chile |
|---|---|---|
| Di Stefano 12' | | Riera 37' |

Estadio George Capwell, Guayaquil
Attendance: 30,000
Referee: Luis Alberto Fernández (Uruguay)

18 December 1947

| Paraguay | 3–1 | Bolivia |
|---|---|---|
| Marín 5'; Genés 20'; Ávalos 25' | | González 71' |

Estadio George Capwell, Guayaquil
Attendance: 12,000
Referee: Juan José Álvarez (Argentina)

18 December 1947

| Argentina | 6–0 | Colombia |
|---|---|---|
| Fernández 7'; Di Stefano 30', 62', 75'; Boyé 38'; Loustau 55' |

Estadio George Capwell, Guayaquil
Attendance: 12,000
Referee: Alfredo Álvarez (Bolivia)

20 December 1947

| Peru | 0–0 | Ecuador |

Estadio George Capwell, Guayaquil
Attendance: 20,000
Referee: Mario Rubén Hayn (Paraguay)

20 December 1947

| Paraguay | 2–0 | Colombia |
|---|---|---|
| Villalba 22', 68' |

Estadio George Capwell, Guayaquil
Attendance: 20,000
Referee: Federico Muñoz Medina (Ecuador)

23 December 1947

| Peru | 5–1 | Colombia |
|---|---|---|
| Mosquera 3'; Guzmán 53', 79'; Gómez Sánchez 67', 81' | | Arango 48' |

Estadio George Capwell, Guayaquil
Attendance: 5,000
Referee: Federico Muñoz Medina (Ecuador)

23 December 1947

| Paraguay | 1–0 | Chile |
|---|---|---|
| Villalba 60' |

Estadio George Capwell, Guayaquil
Attendance: 5,000
Referee: Juan José Álvarez (Argentina)

25 December 1947

| Argentina | 2–0 | Ecuador |
|---|---|---|
| Moreno 30'; Méndez 72' |

Estadio George Capwell, Guayaquil
Attendance: 25,000
Referee: Alfredo Álvarez (Bolivia)

26 December 1947

| Uruguay | 1–0 | Peru |
|---|---|---|
| Falero 74' | | González (red card) 67' |

Estadio George Capwell, Guayaquil
Attendance: 6,000
Referee: Victor Francisco Rivas (Chile)

27 December 1947

| Bolivia | 0–2 | Peru |
|---|---|---|
| | | Castillo 73'; Guzmán 82' |

Estadio George Capwell, Guayaquil
Attendance: 5,000
Referee: Mario Rubén Hayn (Paraguay)

28 December 1947

| Argentina | 3–1 | Uruguay |
|---|---|---|
| Méndez 30', 46'; Loustau 85' | | Britos 74' |

Estadio George Capwell, Guayaquil
Attendance: 25,000
Referee: Mario Rubén Hayn (Paraguay)

29 December 1947

| Paraguay | 4–0 | Ecuador |
|---|---|---|
| Marín 22', 58', 69'; Genés 31' |

Estadio George Capwell, Guayaquil
Attendance: 5,000
Referee: Luis Alberto Fernández (Uruguay)

29 December 1947

| Chile | 4–1 | Colombia |
|---|---|---|
| Prieto 28'; Sáez 75', 88'; Riera 78' | | Granados 90' |

Estadio George Capwell, Guayaquil
Attendance: 5,000
Referee: Juan José Álvarez (Argentina)

31 December 1947

| Chile | 4–3 | Bolivia |
|---|---|---|
| Aráoz 30' (o.g.); Sáez 44'; Infante 50'; López 63' | | Tapia 77'; Tardío 84'; Orgaz 88' |

Estadio George Capwell, Guayaquil
Attendance: 5,000
Referee: Federico Muñoz Medina (Ecuador)

== Result ==
1947 South American Championship champions

Argentina
Ninth title

== Goal scorers ==
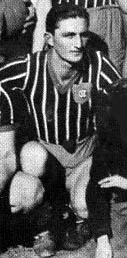
Nicolás Falero, top scorer

8 Goals

- (Uruguay) Nicolás Falero

6 Goals

- (Argentina) Alfredo Di Stéfano
- (Argentina) Norberto Méndez
- (Paraguay) Leocardio Marín

5 Goals

- (Paraguay) Juan B. Villalba

4 Goals

- (Argentina) Mario Boyé
- (Argentina) Félix Loustau
- (Argentina) René Pontoni
- (Paraguay) Alejandrino Genés
- (Uruguay) Héctor Magliano

3 Goals

- (Argentina) Moreno
- (Chile) Pedro H. López
- (Chile) Osvaldo Sáez
- (Peru) Carlos Gómez Sánchez
- (Peru) Luis Guzmán
- (Uruguay) Julio César Britos

2 Goals

- (Bolivia) Benigno Gutiérrez
- (Chile) Fernando Riera
- (Ecuador) José M. Jiménez
- (Peru) Valeriano López
- (Peru) Máximo Mosquera
- (Uruguay) Washington Puente
- (Uruguay) Raúl Sarro

1 Goal

- (Argentina) Mario Fernández
- (Bolivia) Zenón González
- (Bolivia) Severo Orgaz
- (Bolivia) Armando Tapia
- (Bolivia) Arturo Tardío
- (Chile) Miguel Busquets
- (Chile) Raimundo Infante
- (Chile) Jorge Peñaloza
- (Chile) Andrés Prieto
- (Chile) Carlos Varela
- (Colombia) Carlos Arango
- (Colombia) Rafael Granados
- (Ecuador) César Garnica
- (Paraguay) Enrique Ávalos
- (Peru) Félix Castillo
- (Peru) Juan Castillo
- (Uruguay) Schubert Gambetta
- (Uruguay) José García

Own Goal

- (Bolivia) Duberty Aráoz (for Chile)
