= 1949–50 Juventus FC season =

Italian football club season

Juventus Football Club
1949–50 season
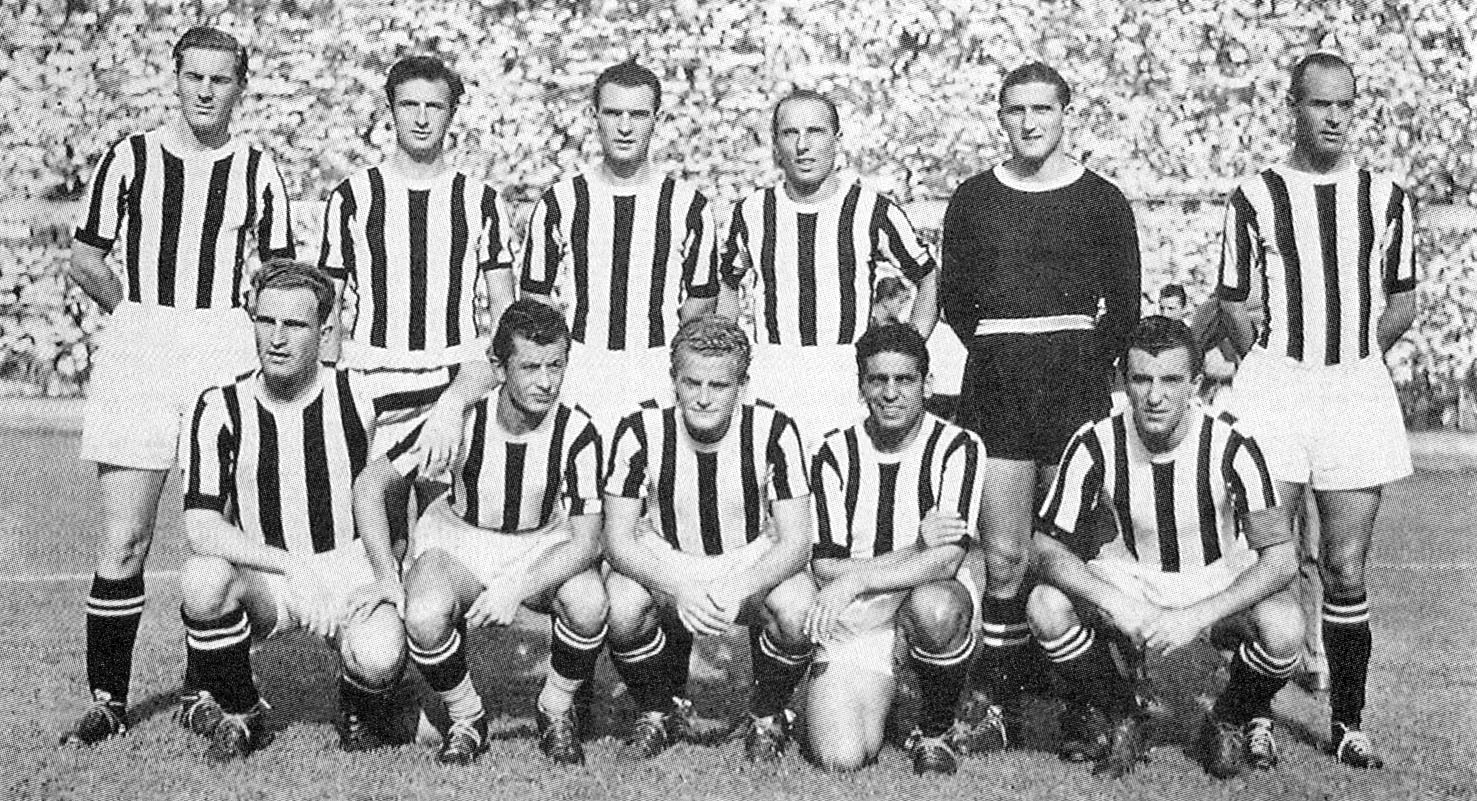
- Chairman: Gianni Agnelli
- Manager: Jesse Carver
- Stadium: Stadio Comunale
- Serie A: 1st
- Top goalscorer: League: John Hansen (28); All: Giacomo Mari (38)
Home colours	Away colours

During the 1949–50 season Juventus Football Club competed in Serie A.

== Summary ==
The team clinched its 8th title despite a colossal 1–7 home defeat against Milan with a superb hat-trick of Swedish striker Gunnar Nordahl. The championship was a reward to chairman Gianni Agnelli who built this team buying Danish players unknown at the time. In the summer he transferred in an Argentinian midfielder Rinaldo Martino from San Lorenzo to boost the club performance.

In this season, Jesse Carver replaced fellow Englishman William Chalmers as head coach of Juventus, and a less rigid and physically demanding training schedule paid off for Hansen. In the club, Hansen had an irreplaceable partner in another Danish player from the 1948 Olympics team, Karl Aage Præst. Præst was a left winger with electric dribbling skills who scattered opponents through the field and produced precise crosses to Hansen, who netted them thanks to his violent and accurate headers. Juventus won the 1949–50 Serie A championship with Hansen scoring 28 goals in 37 games.

== Squad ==
Source: Note: Flags indicate national team as defined under FIFA eligibility rules; some limited exceptions apply. Players may hold more than one non-FIFA nationality.

Pos.	Nation	Player
GK	ITA	Filippo Cavalli
GK	ITA	Giovanni Viola
DF	ITA	Alberto Bertuccelli
DF	ITA	Sergio Manente
DF	ITA	Pietro Rava
MF	ITA	Romolo Bizzotto
MF	ITA	Giacomo Mari
MF	ARG	Rinaldo Martino
MF	ITA	Carlo Parola

Pos.	Nation	Player
MF	ITA	Alberto Piccinini
FW	ITA	Giampiero Boniperti
FW	DEN	John Hansen
FW	ITA	Amos Mariani
FW	ITA	Ermes Muccinelli
FW	DEN	Karl Aage Præst
FW	ITA	Ermanno Scaramuzzi
FW	ITA	Pasquale Vivolo

== Competitions ==
=== Serie A ===
==== League table ====
Pos	Team	Pld	W	D	L	GF	GA	GD	Pts	Qualification or relegation
1	Juventus (C)	38	28	6	4	100	43	+57	62	
2	Milan	38	27	3	8	118	45	+73	57	
3	Internazionale	38	21	7	10	99	60	+39	49	
4	Lazio	38	18	10	10	67	43	+24	46	Qualified for the 1950 Latin Cup
5	Fiorentina	38	18	8	12	76	57	+19	44	

Source: Panini
(C) Champions

==== Matches ====
Win Draw Loss

11 September 1949 1	Juventus	5–2	Fiorentina	Turin
	Boniperti 38'; Martino 40'; J. Hansen 66', 70', 78'	Report	57' Dalla Torre; 85' (pen.) Giusti	Stadium: Comunale; Referee: Armando Marchetti

18 September 1949 2	Lazio	1–3	Juventus	Rome
	Nyers II 56'	Report	41' Martino; 61' J. Hansen; 31' Præst	Stadium: Stadio Torino; Referee: Galeati

25 September 1949 3	Juventus	4–0	Bari	Turin
	J. Hansen 31'; Præst 52'; Piccinini 55'; Muccinelli 81'	Report		Stadium: Comunale; Referee: Longagnani

2 October 1949 4	Milan	0–1	Juventus	Milan
		Report	51' Martino	Stadium: Stadio San Siro; Referee: Dattilo

9 October 1949 5	Juventus	3–0	Triestina	Turin
	Martino 50', 72'; J. Hansen 74' (pen.)	Report		Stadium: Comunale; Referee: Mario Scotto

16 October 1949 6	Atalanta	2–2	Juventus	Bergamo
	Sørensen 52'; K.A. Hansen 66' (pen.)	Report	17' (pen.) Mari; 56' Boniperti	Stadium: Stadio Comunale; Referee: Vincenzo Orlandini

20 October 1949 7	Juventus	1–0	Venezia	Turin
	Parola 19'	Report		Stadium: Comunale; Referee: Lelio Coppolone

23 October 1949 8	Genoa	1–2	Juventus	Genoa
	Formentin 31'	Report	9' J. Hansen; 72' Martino	Stadium: Stadio Luigi Ferraris; Referee: Luigi Gemini

30 October 1949 9	Juventus	2–2	Como	Turin
	Parola 22'; Muccinelli 50'	Report	1' Ghiandi; 41' Stua	Stadium: Comunale; Referee: Mario Scotto

6 November 1949 10	Torino	1–3	Juventus	Turin
	Carapellese 63'	Report	16' J. Hansen; 17' Boniperti; 86' Martino	Stadium: Comunale; Referee: Luigi Gemini

13 November 1949 11	Juventus	3–2	Inter	Turin
	J. Hansen 30' (pen.), 59'; Piccinini 75'	Report	14' Wilkes; 18' Lorenzi	Stadium: Comunale; Referee: Riccardo Pieri

20 November 1949 12	Pro Patria	0–3	Juventus	Busto Arsizio
		Report	21', 47', 69' Præst	Stadium: Comunale; Referee: Vincenzo Orlandini

4 December 1949 13	Juventus	6–2	Palermo	Turin
	Præst 7', 89'; Martino 18', 70', 88'; Vivolo 32'	Report	76', 79' Vycpálek	Stadium: Comunale; Referee: Luigi Valsecchi

8 December 1949 14	Padova	0–2	Juventus	Padua
		Report	5' Martino; 37' (pen.) Mari	Stadium: Stadio Silvio Appiani; Referee: Giovanni Galeati

11 December 1949 15	Juventus	3–0	Roma	Turin
	Muccinelli 84'; Martino 86'; J. Hansen 90'	Report		Stadium: Comunale; Referee: Giorgio Bernardi

18 December 1949 16	Novara	2–3	Juventus	Novara
	Alberico 5'; Piola 56'	Report	19', 22', 73' Boniperti	Stadium: Stadio Comunale; Referee: Bruno Tassini

26 December 1949 17	Bologna	0–4	Juventus	Bologna
		Report	3', 12' Martino; 62' J. Hansen; 82' Boniperti	Stadium: Stadio Comunale; Referee: Guido Agnolin

1 January 1950 18	Juventus	1–2	Lucchese	Turin
	Martino 17'	Report	28' Mazza; 89' Kincses	Stadium: Comunale; Referee: Ferruccio Bellè

8 January 1950 19	Juventus	1–0	Sampdoria	Turin
	Mari 23'	Report		Stadium: Comunale; Referee: Generoso Dattilo

15 January 1950 20	Fiorentina	0–0	Juventus	Florence
		Report		Stadium: Stadio Comunale; Referee: Giorgio Bernardi

22 January 1950 21	Juventus	1–2	Lazio	Turin
	J. Hansen 38'	Report	19', 28' Flamini	Stadium: Comunale; Referee: Giovanni Galeati

29 January 1950 22	Bari	0–0	Juventus	Bari
		Report		Stadium: Stadio della Vittoria; Referee: Luigi Gemini

5 February 1950 23	Juventus	1–7	Milan	Turin
	J. Hansen 12'	Report	15', 26', 49' Nordahl; 23' Gren; 24' Liedholm; 70' Burini; 84' Candiani	Stadium: Comunale; Referee: Giovanni Galeati

12 February 1950 24	Triestina	2–3	Juventus	Trieste
	Blason 4'; Begni 69'	Report	43', 59' J. Hansen; 46' Boniperti	Stadium: Stadio Giuseppe Grezar; Referee: Vincenzo Orlandini

19 February 1950 25	Juventus	2–0	Atalanta	Turin
	J. Hansen 36'; Boniperti 64'	Report		Stadium: Comunale; Referee: Bruno Tassini

23 February 1950 26	Venezia	1–4	Juventus	Venice
	Capelli 8'	Report	51', 69', 84' Martino; 53' Muccinelli	Stadium: Stadio Pier Luigi Penzo; Referee: Renzo Massai

26 February 1950 27	Juventus	6–1	Genoa	Turin
	J. Hansen 9', 36'; Muccinelli 23'; Præst 48', 50'; Boniperti 76'	Report	37' (pen.) Pellicari	Stadium: Comunale; Referee: Ferruccio Bellè

12 March 1950 28	Como	2–6	Juventus	Como
	Mari 26' (o.g.); Ghiandi 52'	Report	8', 21' Muccinelli; 74' J. Hansen; 80', 85', 86' Boniperti	Stadium: Stadio Giuseppe Sinigaglia; Referee: Ferruccio Bellè

19 March 1950 29	Juventus	4–3	Torino	Turin
	Muccinelli 7'; J. Hansen 34'; Boniperti 42', 67'	Report	6' Bengtsson; 25' Frizzi; 79' Giuliano	Stadium: Comunale; Referee: Generoso Dattilo

26 March 1950 30	Inter	2–4	Juventus	Milan
	Bertuccelli 32' (o.g.); Parola 90' (o.g.)	Report	19', 65' J. Hansen; 55' Præst; 77' Muccinelli	Stadium: Arena Civica; Referee: Giovanni Galeati

9 April 1950 31	Juventus	3–1	Pro Patria	Turin
	Muccinelli 36'; J. Hansen 46', 84' (pen.)	Report	5' Pozzi	Stadium: Comunale; Referee: Bruno Tassini

16 April 1950 32	Palermo	0–0	Juventus	Palermo
		Report		Stadium: Stadio Comunale; Referee: Giovanni Galeati

23 April 1950 33	Juventus	4–0	Padova	Turin
	J. Hansen 41'; Boniperti 45', 54'; Muccinelli 56'	Report		Stadium: Comunale; Referee: Marchetti

30 April 1950 34	Roma	1–0	Juventus	Rome
	Zecca 6'	Report		Stadium: Stadio Nazionale; Referee: Agnolin

7 May 1950 35	Juventus	1–1	Novara	Turin
	Muccinelli 35'	Report	16' Spadavecchia	Stadium: Comunale; Referee: Bernardi

14 May 1950 36	Juventus	3–2	Bologna	Turin
	J. Hansen 31', 40'; Præst 47'	Report	44' Jensen; 48' Cervellati	Stadium: Comunale; Referee: Orlandini

21 May 1950 37	Lucchese	1–2	Juventus	Lucca
	Kincses 31'	Report	25' Mari; 66' Boniperti	Stadium: Stadio Porta Elisa; Referee: Bellè

28 May 1950 38	Sampdoria	0–4	Juventus	Genoa
		Report	42' Muccinelli; 78', 79', 84' Boniperti	Stadium: Stadio Luigi Ferraris; Referee: Bruno Guarda

== Statistics ==
=== Squad statistics ===
Competition	Points	Home						Away						Total						GD
Competition	Points	G	W	D	L	Gs	Ga	G	W	D	L	Gs	Ga	G	W	D	L	Gs	Ga	GD
Serie A	62	19	14	2	3	54	27	19	11	4	1	46	16	38	28	6	4	100	43	+57

=== Players statistics ===
==== Appearances ====
- 36. (Italy) Alberto Bertuccelli
- 8. (Italy) Romolo Bizzotto
- 35. (Italy) Giampiero Boniperti
- 1. (Italy) Filippo Cavalli
- 37. (Denmark) John Hansen
- 35. (Italy) Sergio Manente
- 38. (Italy) Giacomo Mari
- 1. (Italy) Amos Mariani
- 33. (Argentina) Rinaldo Martino
- 34. (Italy) Ermes Muccinelli
- 35. (Italy) Carlo Parola
- 32. (Italy) Alberto Piccinini
- 37. (Denmark) Karl Aage Præst
- 6. (Italy) Pietro Rava
- 3. (Italy) Ermanno Scaramuzzi
- 37. (Italy) Giovanni Viola
- 10. (Italy) Pasquale Vivolo

==== Goalscorers ====
- 28. (Denmark) John Hansen
- 21. (Italy) Giampiero Boniperti
- 18. (Argentina) Rinaldo Martino
- 13. (Italy) Ermes Muccinelli
- 11. (Denmark) Karl Aage Præst
- 4. (Italy) Giacomo Mari
- 2. (Italy) Carlo Parola
- 2. (Italy) Alberto Piccinini
- 1. (Italy) Pasquale Vivolo
