= 1945 in Brazilian football =

Football in Brazil
- Season: 1945

The following article presents a summary of the 1945 football (soccer) season in Brazil, which was the 44th season of competitive football in the country.

== Campeonato Paulista ==
Pos	Team	Pld	W	D	L	GF	GA	GD	Pts	Qualification or relegation
1	São Paulo	20	17	2	1	70	20	+50	36	Champions
2	Corinthians	20	14	3	3	56	24	+32	31	
3	Palmeiras	20	11	7	2	47	17	+30	29	
4	Portuguesa	20	10	5	5	44	22	+22	25	
5	Jabaquara	20	9	2	9	48	65	−17	20	
6	Santos	20	8	2	10	34	46	−12	18	
7	Ypiranga	20	8	1	11	37	44	−7	17	
8	São Paulo Railway	20	6	2	12	37	52	−15	14	
9	Juventus	20	5	2	13	34	45	−11	12	
10	Comercial	20	4	3	13	32	60	−28	11	
11	Portuguesa Santista	20	2	3	15	23	69	−46	7	

Updated to match(es) played on October 7, 1945. Source: RSSSF.com
Rules for classification: 1) points; 2) goal difference; 3) wins; 4) head-to-head points.

São Paulo declared as the Campeonato Paulista champions.

== Campeonato Carioca ==
Pos	Team	Pld	W	D	L	GF	GA	GD	Pts	Qualification or relegation
1	Vasco da Gama	18	13	5	0	58	15	+43	31	Champions
2	Botafogo	18	12	3	3	43	14	+29	27	
3	América	18	12	1	5	49	29	+20	25	
4	Flamengo	18	11	3	4	55	26	+29	25	
5	Fluminense	18	8	5	5	37	26	+11	21	
6	São Cristóvão	18	5	4	9	27	37	−10	15 (Note: Madureira lost the points of a tie against São Cristóvão for fielding an ineligible player. the points of the match were awarded to São Cristóvão.)	
7	Canto do Rio	18	5	3	10	29	42	−13	13	
8	Bangu	18	5	1	12	29	57	−28	11	
9	Madureira	18	2	3	13	21	49	−28	6	
10	Bonsucesso	18	3	0	15	22	75	−53	6	

Updated to match(es) played on November 18, 1945. Source: RSSSF.com
Rules for classification: 1) points; 2) goal difference; 3) wins; 4) number of goals scored.
Notes:

Vasco da Gama declared as the Campeonato Carioca champions.

== State championship champions ==
State	Champion	State	Champion
Acre	-	Paraíba	Botafogo-PB
Alagoas	Santa Cruz-AL	Paraná	Atlético Paranaense
Amapá	Amapá	Pernambuco	Náutico
Amazonas	Nacional	Piauí	Botafogo-PI
Bahia	Bahia	Rio de Janeiro	Serrano
Ceará	Ferroviário	Rio de Janeiro (DF)	Vasco
Espírito Santo	Rio Branco-ES	Rio Grande do Norte	ABC
Goiás	Goiânia	Rio Grande do Sul	Internacional
Maranhão	Moto Club	Rondônia	Ypiranga-RO
Mato Grosso	Mixto	Santa Catarina	Avaí
Minas Gerais	Cruzeiro	São Paulo	São Paulo
Pará	Paysandu	Sergipe	Ipiranga-SE

== Brazil national team ==
The following table lists all the games played by the Brazil national football team in official competitions and friendly matches during 1945.

Date	Opposition	Result	Score	Brazil scorers	Competition
January 21, 1945	Colombia	W	3-0	Heleno de Freitas, Jorginho, Jayme de Almeida	South American Championship
January 28, 1945	Bolivia	W	2-0	Tesourinha, Ademir Menezes	South American Championship
February 7, 1945	Uruguay	W	3-0	Heleno de Freitas (2), Rui	South American Championship
February 14, 1945	Argentina	L	1-2	Ademir Menezes	South American Championship
February 21, 1945	Ecuador	W	9-2	Ademir Menezes (3), Jair da Rosa Pinto (2), Heleno de Freitas (2), Zizinho (2)	South American Championship
February 28, 1945	Chile	W	1-0	Heleno de Freitas	South American Championship
December 16, 1945	Argentina	L	3-4	Zizinho, Salomon (own goal), Ademir Menezes	Roca Cup
December 20, 1945	Argentina	W	6-2	Ademir Menezes (2), Leônidas da Silva, Chico, Zizinho, Heleno de Freitas	Roca Cup
December 23, 1945	Argentina	W	3-1	Fonda (own goal), Heleno de Freitas, Eduardo de Lima	Roca Cup
