= Zila =

Zila may refer to:

- Zile
- Zila (country subdivision)
- Zila-ye Aliasgar, a village in Khuzestan Province, Iran
- A jazz group formed by South African saxophonist Dudu Pukwana
- Zila Bezerra (born 1945), Brazilian teacher and politician

== See also ==
- Zilla (disambiguation)
