= 1945 in Brazil =

Events in the year 1945 in Brazil.

== Incumbents ==
=== Federal government ===
- President:
  - Getúlio Vargas (until 29 October)
  - José Linhares (from 29 October)

=== Governors ===
- Alagoas:
  - till 10 November: Ismar de Góis Monteiro
  - 10 November-18 December: Edgar de Góis Monteiro
  - from 18 December: Antonio Guedes de Miranda
- Amazonas: Álvaro Botelho Maia (till 7 November); Emiliano Estanislau Afonso (from 7 November)
- Bahia: Renato Onofre Pinto Aleixo then João Vicente Bulcão Viana
- Ceará: Francisco de Meneses Pimentel (till 28 October); Benedito Augusto Carvalho dos Santos (from 28 October)
- Espírito Santo: Jones dos Santos Neves (till 27 October); José Rodrigues Sette (from 27 October)
- Goiás: Pedro Ludovico Teixeira (till 6 November); Eládio de Amorim (from 6 November)
- Maranhão:
- Mato Grosso: Júlio Strübing Müller then Olegário de Barros
- Minas Gerais: Benedito Valadares Ribeiro (till 4 November); Nísio Batista de Oliveira (from 4 November)
- Pará:
  - till 29 October: Magalhães Barata
  - 29 October-30 October: João Guilherme Bittencourt
  - 30 October-6 November: Zacarias de Assumpção
  - from 6 November: Manuel Maroja Neto
- Paraíba:
  - till 15 July: Rui Carneiro
  - 15 July-6 November: Samuel Duarte
  - from 6 November: Severino Montenegro
- Paraná: Manuel Ribas
- Pernambuco: Agamenon Magalhães
- Piauí:
  - till 9 November: Leônidas Melo
  - 6 November-19 December: Antônio Leôncio Pereira Ferraz
  - from 19 December: Benedito Martins Napoleão do Rego
- Rio Grande do Norte: Rafael Fernandes Gurjão/Antonio Fernandes Dantas
- Rio Grande do Sul: Ernesto Dornelles (till 6 November); Samuel Figueiredo da Silva (from 6 November)
- Santa Catarina: Nereu Ramos (till 6 November); Luís Gallotti (from 6 November)
- São Paulo:
  - till 27 October: Fernando de Sousa Costa
  - 27 October-7 November: Sebastião Nogueira de Lima
  - from 7 November: José Carlos de Macedo Soares
- Sergipe:
  - till 27 October: Augusto Maynard Gomes
  - 27 October-5 November: Francisco Leite Neto
  - from 5 November: Hunald Santaflor Cardoso

=== Vice governors ===
- Rio Grande do Norte:
- São Paulo:

== Events ==
Brazilian Expeditionary Force shoulder sleeve insignia (Army component)

- February - A fourth transport of troops of the Brazilian Expeditionary Force reaches Italy, in preparation for the Spring 1945 offensive.
- 2 April - Brazil restores diplomatic relations with the Soviet Union.
- 2 May - Brazilian troops arrive in Turin on the same day that the cessation of hostilities is announced.
- May - Bishop Carlos Duarte Costa, an outspoken critic of the regime of President Getúlio Vargas and of the Vatican's alleged relationship with fascist regimes, gives newspaper interviews accusing Brazil's Papal nuncio of Nazi-Fascist spying, and accusing Rome of having aided and abetted Hitler. Shortly afterwards he establishes the Brazilian Catholic Apostolic Church.
- 29 October - President Vargas resigns, beginning the period known as the Second Brazilian Republic. José Linhares becomes acting president.
- 2 December - A general election is held, the first since the establishment of Getúlio Vargas' Estado Novo. The presidential election is won by Eurico Gaspar Dutra of the Social Democratic Party (PSD), which also wins a majority of seats in both the Chamber of Deputies and the Senate.

== Arts and culture ==
=== Books ===
- Oswald de Andrade - A Arcádia e a Inconfidência

=== Films ===
- O Cortiço
- O Gol da Vitória
- Não Adianta Chorar

== Births ==
- Unknown date - Eduardo Escorel, film editor and director

=== January ===
- 11 January - Geraldo Azevedo, singer and guitarist

=== February ===
- 18 February - Edir Macedo, evangelical leader and media mogul

=== May ===
- 7 May - Zila Bezerra, teacher and politician

=== August ===
- 13 August - Vânia Dantas Leite, pianist, conductor, music educator and composer (died 2018)

=== September ===
- 26 September - Gal Costa, singer (died 2022)

=== October ===
- 8 October - Paulo Thiago, film director and screenwriter (died 2021)
- 27 October - Luiz Inácio Lula da Silva, 35th President of Brazil

== Deaths ==
- 25 February - Mário de Andrade, poet, novelist, musicologist, art historian and critic, and photographer (born 1893; heart attack)
- 12 April - Max Wolff Filho, war hero (born 1912; killed in action)

== See also ==
- 1945 in Brazilian football

== See also ==
- 1945 in Brazilian football
- List of Brazilian films of 1945
