= 1946 in Brazilian football =

Football in Brazil
- Season: 1946

The following article presents a summary of the 1946 football (soccer) season in Brazil, which was the 45th season of competitive football in the country.

== Campeonato Paulista ==
Final Standings

Position	Team	Points	Played	Won	Drawn	Lost	For	Against	Difference
1	São Paulo	37	20	17	3	0	62	20	42
2	Corinthians	36	20	18	0	2	62	29	33
3	Portuguesa	28	20	13	2	5	46	20	26
4	Santos	22	20	9	4	7	37	32	5
5	Palmeiras	20	20	8	4	8	37	31	6
6	Portuguesa Santista	17	20	7	3	10	41	51	-10
7	Ypiranga-SP	14	20	6	2	12	35	48	-13
8	Comercial-SP	14	20	4	6	10	38	55	-17
9	São Paulo Railway	12	20	5	2	13	27	46	-19
10	Juventus	11	20	4	3	13	32	60	-28
11	Jabaquara	9	20	4	1	15	27	52	-25

São Paulo declared as the Campeonato Paulista champions.

== State championship champions ==
State	Champion	State	Champion
Acre	-	Paraíba	Felipéia
Alagoas	Barroso	Paraná	Coritiba
Amapá	Macapá	Pernambuco	Santa Cruz
Amazonas	Nacional	Piauí	Botafogo-PI
Bahia	Guarany-BA	Rio de Janeiro	Internacional de Petrópolis
Ceará	Fortaleza	Rio de Janeiro (DF)	Fluminense
Espírito Santo	Rio Branco-ES	Rio Grande do Norte	América-RN
Goiás	Goiânia	Rio Grande do Sul	Grêmio
Maranhão	Moto Club	Rondônia	Ferroviário-RO
Mato Grosso	Atlético Matogrossense	Santa Catarina	not disputed
Minas Gerais	Atlético Mineiro	São Paulo	São Paulo
Pará	not disputed	Sergipe	Olímpico-SE

== Other competition champions ==
Competition	Champion
Campeonato Brasileiro de Seleções Estaduais	Rio de Janeiro (DF)

== Brazil national team ==
The following table lists all the games played by the Brazil national football team in official competitions and friendly matches during 1946.

Date	Opposition	Result	Score	Brazil scorers	Competition
January 5, 1946	Uruguay	L	3-4	Jair da Rosa Pinto (2), Zizinho	Copa Rio Branco
January 9, 1946	Uruguay	D	1-1	Heleno de Freitas	Copa Rio Branco
January 16, 1946	Bolivia	W	3-0	Heleno de Freitas (2), Zizinho	South American Championship
January 23, 1946	Uruguay	W	4-3	Jair da Rosa Pinto (2), Heleno de Freitas, Chico	South American Championship
January 29, 1946	Paraguay	D	1-1	Norival	South American Championship
February 3, 1946	Chile	W	5-1	Zizinho (4), Chico	South American Championship
February 10, 1946	Argentina	L	0-2	-	South American Championship
