= 1942 Campeonato Carioca =

Campeonato Carioca
- Season: 1943
- Champions: Flamengo
- Matches played: 135
- Goals scored: 635 (4.7 per match)
- Top goalscorer: Heleno (Botafogo) – 28 goals
- Biggest home win: Madureira 9-2 Bangu (May 17, 1942); São Cristóvão 7-0 América (June 21, 1942)
- Biggest away win: Bonsucesso 0-7 Flamengo (September 20, 1942)
- Highest scoring: São Cristóvão 10-4 Bonsucesso (June 6, 1942)

The 1942 edition of the Campeonato Carioca kicked off on April 5, 1942 and ended on October 11. The final standings were delayed 140 days, as Botafogo challenged the result of their loss to São Cristóvão in court, ultimately losing. Flamengo won the tournament for their 8th time. Botafogo finished runners-up.

== Format ==
The tournament was disputed in a triple round-robin format, with the team with the most points winning the title. No teams were relegated.

== Final standings ==
Pos	Team	Pld	W	D	L	GF	GA	GD	Pts	Qualification or relegation
1	Flamengo	27	20	5	2	87	29	+58	45	Champions
2	Botafogo	27	18	8	1	83	36	+47	44	
3	Fluminense	27	19	4	4	72	42	+30	42	
4	São Cristóvão	27	9	8	10	74	58	+16	26	
5	Madureira	27	10	6	11	70	67	+3	26	
6	América	27	9	7	11	62	62	0	25	
7	Vasco da Gama	27	8	6	13	44	52	−8	22	
8	Canto do Rio	27	6	8	13	51	72	−21	20	
9	Bangu	27	5	2	20	48	94	−46	12	
10	Bonsucesso	27	2	4	21	44	123	−79	8	

Source: RSSSF.com
Rules for classification: 1) points; 2) goal difference; 3) wins; 4) number of goals scored.

== Top Scores ==
Rank	Player	Club	Goals
1	Heleno	Botafogo	28
2	Isaías	Madureira	27
3	Geraldino	Canto do Rio	23
3	Anito	Bangu	23
3	Sylvio Pirillo	Flamengo	23
