= 1893 in Brazil =

Events in the year 1893 in Brazil.

== Incumbents ==
=== Federal government ===
- President: Marshal Floriano Peixoto
- Vice-President: vacant

=== Governors ===
- Alagoas: Gabino Besuoro
- Amazonas: Eduardo Gonçalves Ribeiro
- Bahia: Rodrigues Lima
- Ceará: Antônio Nogueira Accioli
- Goiás:
  - until July 1: Antônio Caiado
  - from July 1: José Inácio Xavier de Brito
- Maranhão:
  - until October 27: Alfredo Martins
  - from October 27: Casimiro Vieira Jr
- Mato Grosso:
- Minas Gerais: Afonso Pena
- Pará: Lauro Sodré
- Paraíba: Álvaro Lopes Machado
- Paraná: Francisco Xavier da Silva, then Vicente Machado da Silva Lima
- Pernambuco: Alexandre José Barbosa Lima
- Piauí: Coriolano de Carvalho e Silva
- Rio Grande do Norte: Pedro de Albuquerque Maranhão
- Rio Grande do Sul:
  - until September 27: Vitoriano Ribeiro Carneiro Monteiro
  - from September 27: Fernando Fernandes Abbott
- Santa Catarina:
- São Paulo:
- Sergipe:

=== Vice governors ===
- Rio de Janeiro: Manuel Torres
- Rio Grande do Norte: Silvino Bezerra
- São Paulo: José Alves de Cerqueira César

== Events ==
- September – Revolta da Armada launched by Royalist admiral Custódio José de Melo
- November – beginning of the Federalist Revolution
- 71.2% of the working population of São Paulo is foreign-born.

== Births ==
- January 19 – Magda Tagliaferro, pianist of French parentage (died 1986)
- May 16 – Ronald de Carvalho, poet and diplomat (died 1935)
- October 9 – Mário de Andrade, poet, novelist, musicologist, art historian and critic, and photographer (died 1945)

== Deaths ==
- July 13 – William Hutchinson Norris, founder of the city of Americana, São Paulo (born 1800)
