= 1949 Argentine Primera División =

58th season of top-tier football league in Argentina

Primera División
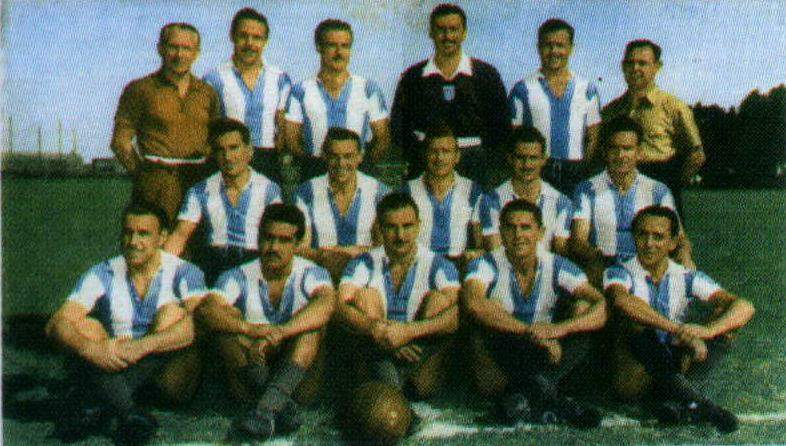
- Racing Club, champion
- Season: 1949
- Champions: Racing (10th title)
- Promoted: Atlanta; Ferro Carril Oeste
- Relegated: Lanús
- Top goalscorer: (Argentina) Juan José Pizzuti (Argentina) Llamil Simes (26 goals each)

The 1949 Argentine Primera División was the 58th season of top-flight football in Argentina. The season began on April 24 and ended on February 16, 1950.

Atlanta and Ferro Carril Oeste returned to Primera, while Lanús was relegated. Racing won its 10th league title.

For the first time, the AFA established as mandatory the use of squad numbers for Primera División matches. Displayed on players' backs, shirts had to be numbered from 2 to 11 so this rule was not mandatory for goalkeepers. The system entered into force since the 9th fixture on June 26.

Relegation system had been established in Argentina in 1937, when it was ruled that the worst placed teams would be relegated to Second Division. Due to the 1948 players' strike demanding better working conditions, relegations were suspended until the conflict was solved. As the championship continued normally and the Ministry of Labour ruled the maximum salary for football players would be mn$ 1,500, several players emigrated in search of better opportunities, most to Colombia which was not affiliated to FIFA by then. Some of the most notable footballers that emigrated were Adolfo Pedernera, Alfredo Di Stéfano, Pipo Rossi, Antonio Sastre, René Pontoni, and Julio Cozzi.

Relegations came back for the 1949 season, with only one team to be relegated. Nevertheless, few weeks before the championship ended, the AFA established that in case of Boca Juniors (which made the worst performance in the club's history) or Huracán finished in the last position, relegations would be annulled. This decision was based on the poor campaign of both teams in the tournament. In the last fixture, Boca beat Lanús 5–1 and could avoid relegation. As Huracán defeating arch-rival Banfield 1–0, Lanús and Huracán finished in the last position, with 26 points each. As goal difference did not count, they had to play a series to define which team would be relegated to the Second Division.

== League standings ==
Pos	Team	Pld	W	D	L	GF	GA	GD	Pts	Qualification or relegation
1	Racing	34	21	7	6	87	47	+40	49	Champions
2	River Plate	34	18	7	9	71	36	+35	43	Runner-up playoff (W)
2	Platense	34	16	11	7	68	48	+20	43	Runner-up playoff (L)
4	San Lorenzo	34	17	8	9	72	62	+10	42	
5	Newell's Old Boys	34	15	11	8	61	50	+11	41	
6	Estudiantes (LP)	34	13	12	9	53	54	−1	38	
7	Vélez Sársfield	34	15	5	14	49	52	−3	35	
8	Chacarita Juniors	34	14	5	15	57	61	−4	33	
8	Independiente	34	12	9	13	65	72	−7	33	
10	Banfield	34	11	10	13	70	77	−7	32	
11	Gimnasia y Esgrima (LP)	34	11	8	15	54	58	−4	30	
12	Rosario Central	34	12	5	17	62	67	−5	29	
12	Ferro Carril Oeste	34	10	9	15	47	59	−12	29	
12	Atlanta	34	14	1	19	48	64	−16	29	
15	Boca Juniors	34	10	7	17	52	58	−6	27	
15	Tigre	34	9	9	16	52	68	−16	27	
17	Huracán	34	9	8	17	47	57	−10	26	Relegation playoff (W)
17	Lanús	34	9	8	17	59	84	−25	26	Relegation playoff (L)

== Runner-up playoff ==
Both River Plate and Platense finished 2nd. with 43 points and played a two-legged series to define the runners-up, in neutral venue.

=== First leg ===
14 Dec 1949

Platense	1–2	River Plate
Báez	Report	Labruna; Coll

Estadio Gasómetro, Buenos Aires
Referee: Charles Dean (England)

=== Second leg ===
26 Dec 1949

River Plate	4–0	Platense
Labruna; Fizel; Ramos	Report

Estadio Gasómetro, Buenos Aires
Referee: Orlando Ruggiero

== Relegation series ==
As Huracán and Lanús finished both in the last position, a two-legged series in neutral venues (no goal difference allowed) were conducted to define which team would be relegated.

=== First leg ===
18 Dec 1949

Huracán	1–0	Lanús
Vigo 60'	Report 1

Estadio Gasómetro, Buenos Aires
Attendance: 35,000
Referee: Harry Hartless

=== Second leg ===
24 Dec 1949

Lanús	4–1	Huracán
Martínez 24', 51'; Contreras 85'; Daponte 87'	Report 1	Trejo 17'

Independiente Stadium, Avellaneda
Attendance: 30,000
Referee: Charles Dean (England)

=== Playoff ===
1 Jan 1950

Huracán	3–3 extra time not held	Lanús
Vigo 40'; Filgueiras 41'; Lanza 48'	Report	Pairoux 13', 33', 77'

Estadio Gasómetro, Buenos Aires
Attendance: 65,000
Referee: Bert Cross (England)

Note: Huracán players left the field at 90', therefore extra time not played. The AFA supported Huracán, alleging that the referee did not known the regulations. The match was annulled and a rematch scheduled to define relegation.

With 2' remaining, Vigo scored the 4th. goal for Huracán, but referee Bert Cross annulled it after an indication by assistant Parker. Following that, the Huracán players left the field in disagreement with the decision. As they refused to come back to the field, Cross finished the match, and the extra time could not be carried out. Huracán players alleged they were waiting for the overtime in the dressing room until they heard the match had been suspended. On the other hand, Lanús requested the AFA they were declared winners according to rules. Nevertheless, on January 12 the association stated it was the referee who had been finished the match on his own therefore no punishment for Huracán players was conducted. The body also stated that Cross was not aware of the rules in case of the tie, and that was the reason he finished the game. As a result, a fourth match would be scheduled to define which team would be relegated. In case of a tie, two extra times of 30' each would be played.

=== Playoff rematch ===
16 Feb 1950

Huracán	3–2	Lanús
Trejo 34', 40'; Martínez 79'	Report	Lacasia 19'; Pairoux 37' (pen.)

Estadio Monumental, Buenos Aires
Attendance: 40,000
Referee: Wally Muller (Austria)

Team details

Huracán
Lanús

GK	Enrique Ferro
DF	Héctor Uzal
DF	Juan M. Filgueiras
MF	Néstor Naya
MF	Juan C. Giménez
MF	Enrique Cerioni
FW	Octavio Caserio
FW	Omar E. Muraco
FW	Trejo
FW	José Vigo
FW	José Lanza
Manager:
(Paraguay) Manuel Fleitas Solich?

GK	Antonio Gioffré
DF	Salvador Calvente
DF	González
MF	Armando Díaz
MF	León Stremblel
MF	Nicolás Daponte
MF	Carlos Lacasia
MF	Osvaldo Gil
FW	Norberto Pairoux
FW	Raúl Martínez
FW	Ramón Moyano
Manager:
(Argentina) Mario Fortunato?

Note: Abandoned at 80', score stood. Huracán won the series 4–2 on points, therefore Lanús was relegated.

When the referee awarded Huracán a penalty kick after a doubtful foul, the Lanús players did not allow Huracán make the kick. The referee decided to suspend the match with 10' remaining. The AFA's Disciplinary Court ruled in favour of C.A. Huracán, declaring them winners of the series so Lanús was relegated to Primera B. Unlike the previous match, rules were strictly followed and Lanús lost points due to their players abandoned the field.

== Aftermath ==
Due to its irregularities, the event has been defined as "... one more immorality in the long series of shameful events that the history of Argentine football contains"., and "shameful", highlighting the controversial decisions from AFA's Disciplinary Court, using adjectives like "outrageous" to define it.
