= Desiderio Medina =

Chilean footballer (1919-1986)

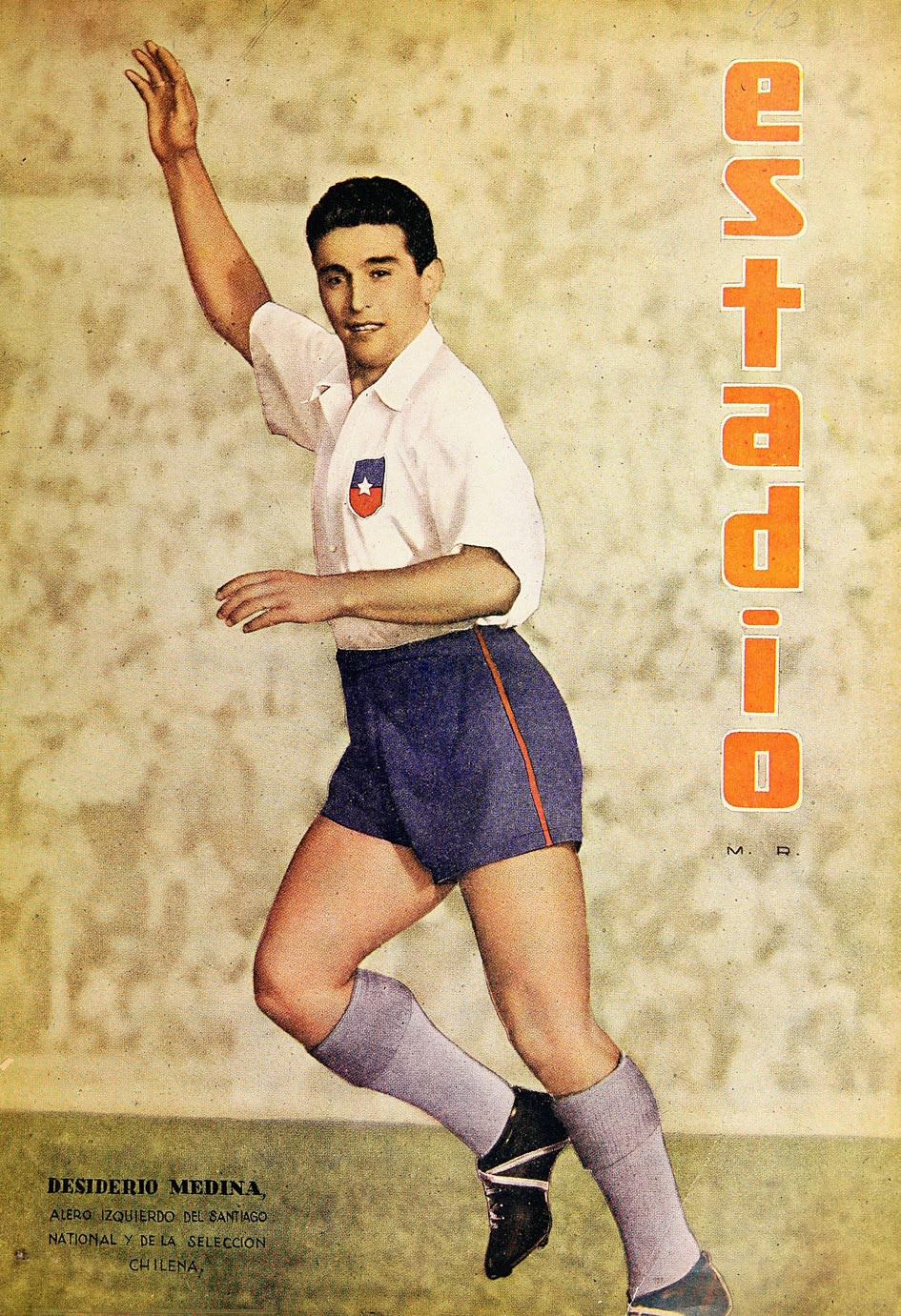
- Medina in 1946

Personal information
- Full name: Desiderio Guillermo Medina Saravia
- Date of birth: 10 October 1919
- Date of death: 17 June 1986 (aged 66)
- Position: Forward

International career
Years	Team	Apps	(Gls)
1941–1946	Chile	12	(5)
Medal record
Men's football
Representing Chile
Copa América
Third place	1941 Chile
Third place	1945 Chile

Desiderio Guillermo Medina Saravia (10 October 1919 – 17 June 1986) was a Chilean footballer. He played in twelve matches for the Chile national football team from 1941 to 1946. He was also part of Chile's squads for the 1941, 1945 and 1946 South American Championships.
