= 1946 São Paulo FC season =

São Paulo
1946 season
- Chairman: Décio Pacheco Pedroso; Roberto Gomes Pedroza
- Manager: Joreca
- Campeonato Paulista: Champions

The 1946 football season was São Paulo's 17th season since the club's founding in 1930.

== Overall ==
Games played	37 (20 Campeonato Paulista, 17 Friendly match)
Games won	29 (17 Campeonato Paulista, 12 Friendly match)
Games drawn	4 (3 Campeonato Paulista, 1 Friendly match)
Games lost	4 (0 Campeonato Paulista, 4 Friendly match)
Goals scored	121
Goals conceded	50
Goal difference	+71
Best result	7–0 (A) v Juventus - Campeonato Paulista - 1946.10.26
Worst result	1–2 (A) v Palmeiras - Friendly match - 1946.03.17; 1–2 (H) v Fluminense - Friendly match - 1946.04.23; 1–2 (A) v Portuguesa Santista - Friendly match - 1946.11.24; 1–2 (H) v River Plate - Friendly match - 1946.12.15
Most appearances	
Top scorer	

Source: São Paulo FC

== Friendlies ==
January 1 National	São Paulo	5–1	Corinthians	São Paulo
	Goal		Goal	Stadium: Estádio Paulo Machado de Carvalho (Pacaembu)

February 17 International	São Paulo (Brazil)	3–2	(Paraguay) Libertad	São Paulo
	Goal		Goal	Stadium: Estádio Paulo Machado de Carvalho (Pacaembu)

February 23 National	São Paulo	4–2	São Cristóvão	São Paulo
	Goal		Goal	Stadium: Estádio Paulo Machado de Carvalho (Pacaembu)

March 13 Taça Cidade de São Paulo	São Paulo	3–2	Corinthians	São Paulo
	Goal		Goal	Stadium: Estádio Paulo Machado de Carvalho (Pacaembu)

March 17 Taça Cidade de São Paulo	Palmeiras	2–1	São Paulo	São Paulo
	Goal		Goal	Stadium: Estádio Paulo Machado de Carvalho (Pacaembu)

March 24 National	São Paulo	3–3	Ypiranga	São Paulo
	Goal		Goal	Stadium: Estádio Paulo Machado de Carvalho (Pacaembu)

April 7 Taça Argemiro de Oliveira	Barretos	1–7	São Paulo	Barretos
	Goal		Goal

April 10 Taça Amizade	Vasco da Gama	1–2	São Paulo	Rio de Janeiro
	Goal		Goal	Stadium: Estádio Vasco da Gama (São Januário)

April 17 National	São Paulo	7–1	Flamengo	São Paulo
	Goal		Goal	Stadium: Estádio Paulo Machado de Carvalho (Pacaembu)

April 23 National	São Paulo	1–2	Fluminense	São Paulo
	Goal		Goal	Stadium: Estádio Paulo Machado de Carvalho (Pacaembu)

May 8 National	Guarani	3–4	São Paulo	Campinas
	Goal		Goal

June 30 Taça Capitalização	XV de Piracicaba	2–5	São Paulo	Piracicaba
	Goal		Goal

August 4 Taça Viana	Caldense	1–5	São Paulo	Poços de Caldas
	Goal		Goal

August 25 Taça General Almeida	Gran São João	2–4	São Paulo	Limeira
	Goal		Goal

November 24 National	Portuguesa Santista	2–1	São Paulo	Santos
	Goal		Goal	Stadium: Estádio Ulrico Mursa

December 15 International	São Paulo (Brazil)	1–2	(Argentina) River Plate	São Paulo
	Goal		Goal	Stadium: Estádio Paulo Machado de Carvalho (Pacaembu)

December 22 National	Batatais	0–2	São Paulo	Batatais
			Goal	Stadium: Estádio Doutor Oswaldo Scatena

December 29 Taça dos Campeões RJ-SP	São Paulo	3–1	Fluminense	São Paulo
	Goal		Goal	Stadium: Estádio Paulo Machado de Carvalho (Pacaembu)

== Official competitions ==
=== Campeonato Paulista ===
April 14 1	São Paulo	4–0	Jabaquara	São Paulo
	Goal			Stadium: Estádio Paulo Machado de Carvalho (Pacaembu)

April 27 2	São Paulo	5–2	Portuguesa Santista	São Paulo
	Goal		Goal	Stadium: Estádio Paulo Machado de Carvalho (Pacaembu)

May 5 3	São Paulo Railway	1–3	São Paulo	São Paulo
	Goal		Goal	Stadium: Estádio Paulo Machado de Carvalho (Pacaembu)

May 19 4	Ypiranga	3–4	São Paulo	São Paulo
	Goal		Goal	Stadium: Estádio Paulo Machado de Carvalho (Pacaembu)

June 2 5	São Paulo	7–3	Juventus	São Paulo
	Goal		Goal	Stadium: Estádio Paulo Machado de Carvalho (Pacaembu)

June 9 6	Corinthians	1–2	São Paulo	São Paulo
	Goal		Goal	Stadium: Estádio Paulo Machado de Carvalho (Pacaembu)

June 23 7	Portuguesa	1–1	São Paulo	São Paulo
	Goal		Goal	Stadium: Estádio Paulo Machado de Carvalho (Pacaembu)

July 7 8	Comercial	2–6	São Paulo	São Paulo
	Goal		Goal	Stadium: Estádio Paulo Machado de Carvalho (Pacaembu)

July 14 9	Santos	2–3	São Paulo	Santos
	Goal		Goal	Stadium: Estádio Urbano Caldeira (Vila Belmiro)

July 21 10	São Paulo	1–1	Palmeiras	São Paulo
	Goal		Goal	Stadium: Estádio Paulo Machado de Carvalho (Pacaembu)

July 28 11	Portuguesa Santista	0–2	São Paulo	Santos
			Goal	Stadium: Estádio Ulrico Mursa

August 11 12	São Paulo	4–2	Comercial	São Paulo
	Goal		Goal	Stadium: Estádio Paulo Machado de Carvalho (Pacaembu)

August 18 13	São Paulo	1–0	Ypiranga	São Paulo
	Goal			Stadium: Estádio Paulo Machado de Carvalho (Pacaembu)

August 31 14	São Paulo	2–0	Santos	São Paulo
	Goal			Stadium: Estádio Paulo Machado de Carvalho (Pacaembu)

September 7 15	Jabaquara	0–4	São Paulo	Santos
			Goal	Stadium: Estádio Ulrico Mursa

September 15 16	São Paulo	2–0	São Paulo Railway	São Paulo
	Goal			Stadium: Estádio Paulo Machado de Carvalho (Pacaembu)

September 29 17	São Paulo	2–1	Corinthians	São Paulo
	Goal		Goal	Stadium: Estádio Paulo Machado de Carvalho (Pacaembu)

October 13 18	São Paulo	1–1	Portuguesa	São Paulo
	Goal		Goal	Stadium: Estádio Paulo Machado de Carvalho (Pacaembu)

October 26 19	Juventus	0–7	São Paulo	São Paulo
			Goal	Stadium: Estádio Paulo Machado de Carvalho (Pacaembu)

November 10 20	Palmeiras	0–1	São Paulo	São Paulo
			Goal	Stadium: Estádio Paulo Machado de Carvalho (Pacaembu)

==== Record ====
Final Position	Points	Matches	Wins	Draws	Losses	Goals For	Goals Away	Win%
1st	37	20	17	3	0	62	20	92%
