= Norberto Méndez (footballer) =

Argentine footballer (1923–1998)

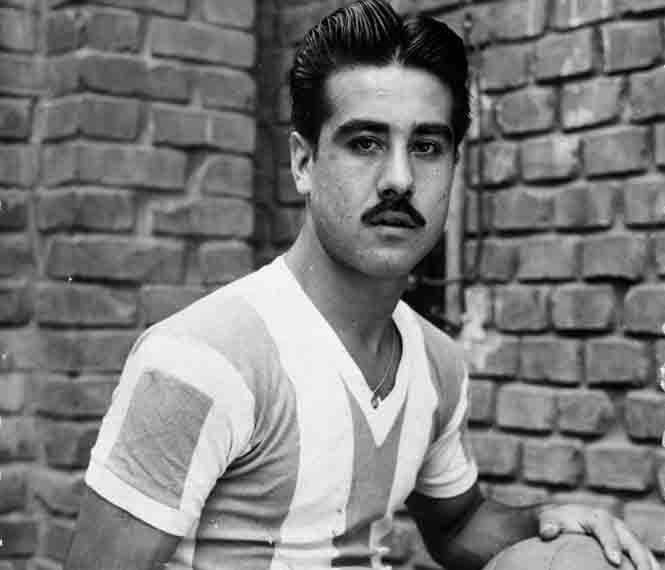
- Méndez with the Argentina in 1947

Personal information
- Full name: Norberto Doroteo Méndez
- Date of birth: 5 January 1923
- Place of birth: Buenos Aires, Argentina
- Date of death: 22 June 1998 (aged 75)
- Position: Inside forward

Youth career
- 1940–1941: Huracán

Senior career*
Years	Team	Apps	(Gls)
1941–1947	Huracán	177	(67)
1947–1954	Racing Club	128	(47)
1954–1956	Tigre	46	(7)
1956–1958	Huracán	38	(11)

International career
1945–1956	Argentina	31	(19)
- * Club domestic league appearances and goals

Norberto Doroteo Méndez (January 5, 1923 – June 22, 1998), nicknamed Tucho, was an Argentine footballer who played as a midfielder. Internationally, he played 31 games for the Argentina national team and won 3 Copa América titles; together with Zizinho, he is the competition's joint-highest goalscorer, with 17 goals.

In domestic football, Méndez's most notable tenures were on Huracán (where he won three National cups) and Racing, winning three Primera División championships.

== Club career ==
He was born on January 5, 1923, in the city of Buenos Aires. Méndez started his playing career with Huracán in 1941. In 1947 he moved to Racing Club where he helped the team win three consecutive Primera División titles in 1949, 1950 and 1951. In 1954 Méndez moved to Tigre, he returned to Huracán in 1956 and he retired from football in 1958 at the age of 35.

Méndez once said that he had three great loves in his life: Huracán was his girlfriend, Racing his wife and the Argentina national team his passion.

== International career ==
Méndez played for the Argentina national team between 1945 and 1956, he played 31 games and scored 19 goals.

Méndez helped Argentina to win three Copa América titles, and scored 17 goals in the competition, making him (along with Zuzinho the joint-highest scoring player in the history of the tournament.

== Honours ==
=== Club ===
Huracán

- Copa Adrián C. Escobar (2): 1942, 1943
- Copa de Competencia Británica (1): 1944

Racing Club

- Primera División (3): 1949, 1950, 1951

=== International ===
Argentina

- Copa América (3): 1945, 1946, 1947
- Copa Lipton (1): 1945
- Copa Newton (1): 1945

=== Individual ===
- Copa América all-time top scorer: 21 goals
- Copa América Golden Boot: 1945
- Copa América Silver Boot: 1946, 1947
