= Juan Alcántara =

Chilean footballer (1920-2002)

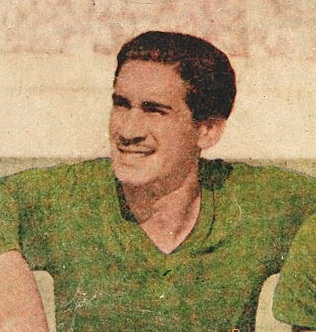
- Alcántara with Audax Italiano in 1944

Personal information
- Full name: Juan Victoriano Alcántara Díaz
- Date of birth: 6 March 1920
- Place of birth: Viña del Mar, Chile
- Date of death: 7 July 2002 (aged 82)
- Position: Forward

Youth career
- Carmelo y Praga

Senior career*
| Years | Team | Apps | (Gls) |
| 1938 | Carmelo y Praga | | |
| 1939–1947 | Audax Italiano | | |

International career
| 1945–1946 | Chile | 5 | (6) |
- * Club domestic league appearances and goals

Juan Victoriano Alcántara Díaz (6 March 1920 – 7 July 2002) was a Chilean footballer. He played in five matches for the Chile national football team in 1945 and 1946. He was also part of Chile's squad for the 1945 South American Championship. and part of Chile's squad for the 1946 South American Championship.

== Career ==
Alcántara was trained at the club Carmelo y Praga from his hometown and made his senior debut in 1938. In 1939, he moved to Audax Italiano.

== Personal life ==
His younger brother, Manuel, was a football forward who played for Carmelo y Praga and Everton de Viña del Mar.
