= Erasmo Vera =

Chilean footballer (1923-1989)

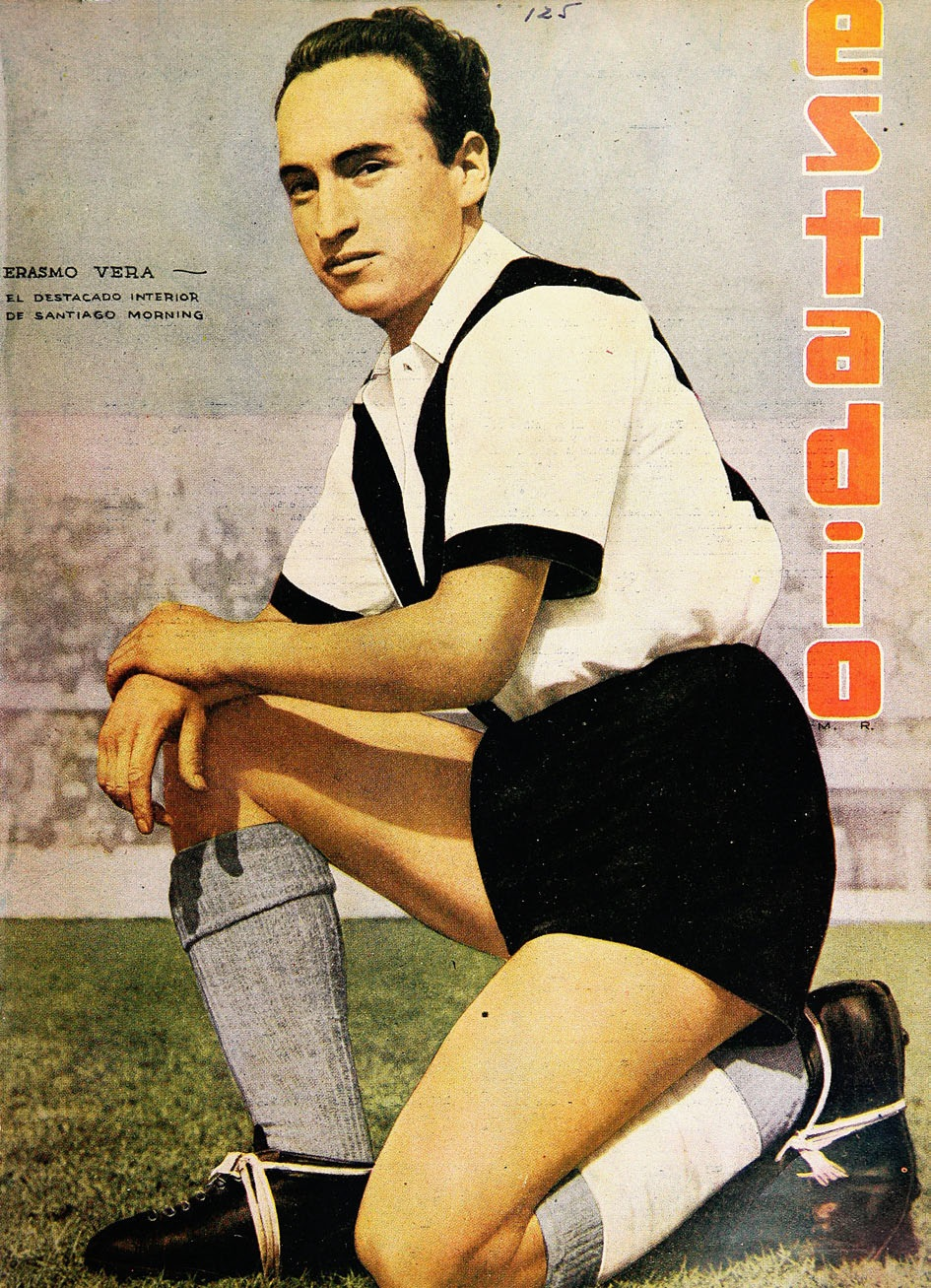
- Vera in 1945

Personal information
- Full name: José Erasmo Vera Ulloa
- Date of birth: 13 March 1923
- Date of death: 16 August 1989 (aged 66)
- Position: Forward

International career
Years	Team	Apps	(Gls)
1945–1946	Chile	9	(1)

José Erasmo Vera Ulloa (13 March 1923 – 16 August 1989) was a Chilean footballer. He played in nine matches for the Chile national football team in 1945 and 1946. He was also part of Chile's squad for the 1945 South American Championship.
