= Guillermo Clavero =

Chilean footballer (1921-2000)

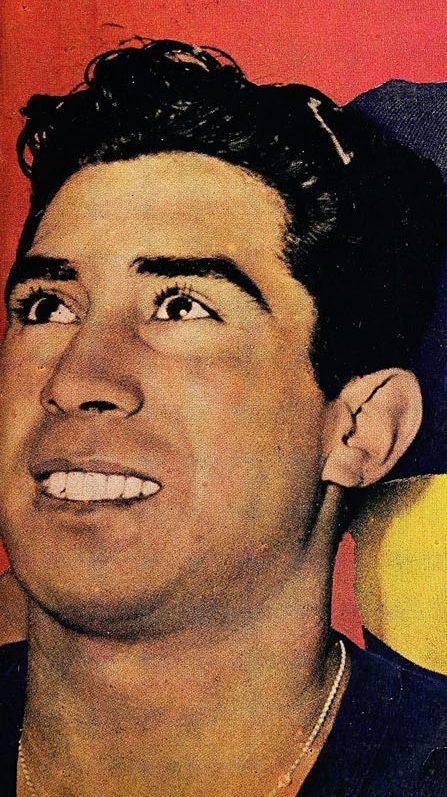

Personal information
- Date of birth: 10 August 1921
- Date of death: 15 April 2000 (aged 78)
- Position: Midfielder

International career
| Years | Team | Apps | (Gls) |
| 1945 | Chile | 6 | (3) |

Guillermo Clavero (10 August 1921 – 15 April 2000) was a Chilean footballer. He played in six matches for the Chile national football team in 1945. He was also part of Chile's squad for the 1945 South American Championship.
