= List of Brazilian films of 1945 =

A list of films produced in Brazil in 1945:

Title	Director	Cast	Genre	Notes
Cem Garotas e um Capote	Milton Rodrigues	Mesquitinha, Humberto Catalano, Sally Loretti	Musical comedy	
Loucos Por Música	Adhemar Gonzaga	Lena Mendonça de Barros, Colé Santana, Walter D'Ávila	Musical comedy	
Não Adianta Chorar	Watson Macedo	Oscarito, Grande Otelo, Mary Gonçalves	Musical comedy	
No Trampolim da Vida	Franz Eichhorn	Alexandre Alencastro, Lamartine Babo, Cléa Barros	Drama	
O Cortiço	Luiz de Barros	Manoel Vieira, Miguel Orico, Manoel Rocha	Comedy	
Pif-Paf	Luiz de Barros, Adhemar Gonzaga	Walter D'Ávila, Júlia Vidal, Marlene	Musical comedy	
O Gol da Vitória	José Carlos Burle	Jorge Amaral, Cléa Barros, João Cabral	Comedy	
Vidas Solitárias	Moacyr Fenelon	Mário Brasini, Vanda Lacerda, Mary Gonçalves	Drama	

== See also ==
- 1945 in Brazil
