= René Pontoni =

Argentine footballer (1920–1983)

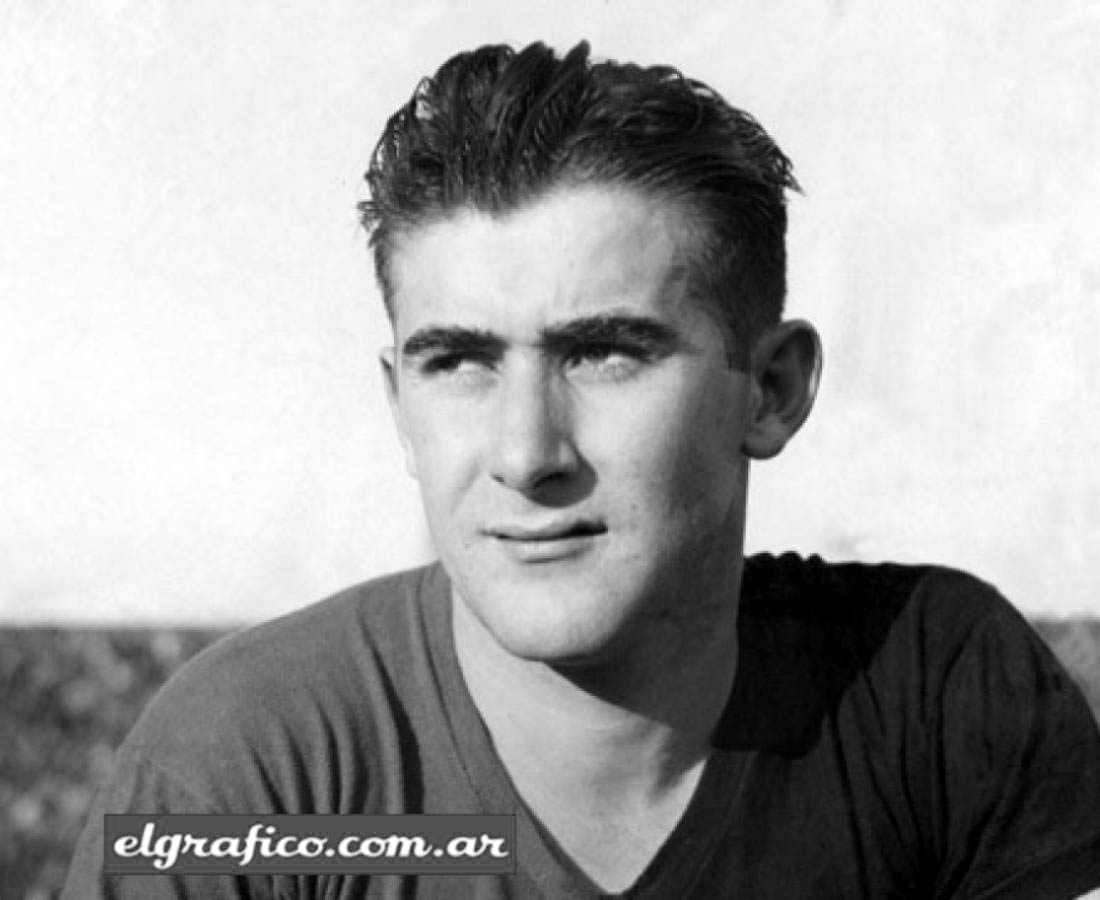
- Pontoni as player of Newell's Old Boys

Personal information
- Full name: René Alejandro Pontoni
- Date of birth: 18 May 1920
- Place of birth: Santa Fe, Argentina
- Date of death: 14 April 1983 (aged 62)
- Position: Striker

Youth career
- Gimnasia y Esgrima de Santa Fe

Senior career*
| Years | Team | Apps | (Gls) |
| 1940–1944 | Newell's Old Boys | 110 | (67) |
| 1945–1948 | San Lorenzo | 102 | (66) |
| 1949–1952 | Independiente Santa Fe | 44 | (27) |
| 1953 | Portuguesa | ? | (?) |
| 1954 | San Lorenzo | (see above) | |

International career
| 1942–1947 | Argentina | 19 | (19) |

Managerial career
- 1956 – 1957: Newell's Old Boys
- 1962: San Lorenzo
- * Club domestic league appearances and goals as of 15 November 2007

René Alejandro Pontoni (May 18, 1920, in Santa Fe, Argentina – May 14, 1983) was an Argentine footballer. He played club football in Argentina, Colombia and Brazil as well as representing the Argentina national football team on 19 occasions.

== Biography ==
Pontoni started his career with Gimnasia y Esgrima de Santa Fe before joining Newell's Old Boys in 1940. Pontoni made his debut for the Argentina national team in 1942. He went on to score 19 goals in 19 games for his country, helping them to become South American champions in 1945, 1946 and 1947.

In 1944 Pontoni joined San Lorenzo where he helped the team to win the Primera División in 1946. In 1948 he suffered a career threatening injury but he recovered, moving to Colombia in 1949 to play for Independiente Santa Fe where he remained until 1952.

In 1953 Pontoni moved to Brazil, where he spent one season with Portuguesa in São Paulo before returning to Argentina for one last season with San Lorenzo in 1954.

== Titles ==
News Old Boys

- Torneo Cuadrangular Rosario: 1942
- Torneo Internacional Nocturno Rioplatense: 1943
- Copa General Pedro Ramírez runner-up: 1944

San Lorenzo

- Primera División Argentina: 1946

Independiente Santa Fe

- Copa Colombia runner-up: 1950–51

Portuguesa

- Torneio Rio–São Paulo: 1952

Argentina

- Copa América: 1945, 1946, 1947

== Later years ==
In 1963 former Boca Juniors player Mario Boyé and former San Lorenzo de Almagro player René Pontoni, brothers-in-law who had both been members of Argentine national teams, set up a pizzería in Belgrano, Buenos Aires, La Guitarrita, which expanded into a chain, still run by Pontoni's grandson as of 2024. Pontoni also had several spells as a football manager in the lower leagues of Argentine football.
