= Rinaldo Martino =

Italian-Argentine footballer

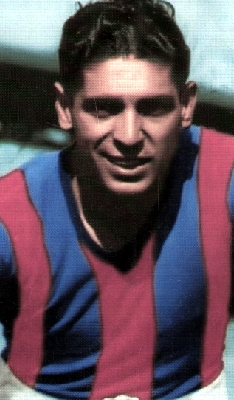
- Martino in 1943

Personal information
- Full name: Rinaldo Fioramonte Martino
- Date of birth: 6 November 1921
- Place of birth: Rosario, Argentina
- Date of death: 15 November 2000 (aged 79)
- Place of death: Buenos Aires, Argentina
- Position: Second striker

Youth career
- Belgrano de Rosario

Senior career*
Years	Team	Apps	(Gls)
1941–1948	San Lorenzo	223	(142)
1949–1950	Juventus	33	(18)
1950	Nacional		
1951	Boca Juniors	15	(3)
1951–1953	Nacional		
1953	São Paulo FC	5	(1)
1953	C.A. Cerro		

International career
1942–1948	Argentina	20	(15)
1949	Italy	1	(0)
- * Club domestic league appearances and goals

Rinaldo Fioramonte Martino (Italian pronunciation: [riˈnaldo fjoraˈmonte marˈtiːno]; 6 November 1921 – 15 November 2000) was an Italian Argentine forward who played for both the Argentine and the Italy national football teams. Usually a forward, Martino was a player known for his lethal combination of goal scoring ability, playmaking skills and technique.

== Club career ==
Martino was signed by San Lorenzo de Almagro in 1941 at the age of 19 from Belgrano de Rosario. He made his debut in 1941 against Newell's Old Boys and in 1942 he became the top scorer in the Argentine Primera netting 25 goals in 30 games. In 1946, the team won the Primera División championship.

Rinaldo Martino at Juventus

In 1949, Martino moved to Italy, joining Juventus and helping them to record their first championship since the 1930s. During his time in Italy, he made one appearance for the Italy national team.

Martino then moved to Uruguay to play for Nacional, helping them to win the Uruguayan Championship. In 1951, Martino returned to Argentina to play for Boca Juniors, but he was sold back to Nacional in 1952 for 300,000 pesos. He played there until 1953, helping the team to win another Uruguayan league title and several other minor titles. In 1953, Nacional released his pass, and Martino went to São Paulo FC, for a period of testing during the Rio–São Paulo Tournament. After five games, he didn't like it and was released. Still in 1953, he joined C.A. Cerro, who were his last club.

== International career ==
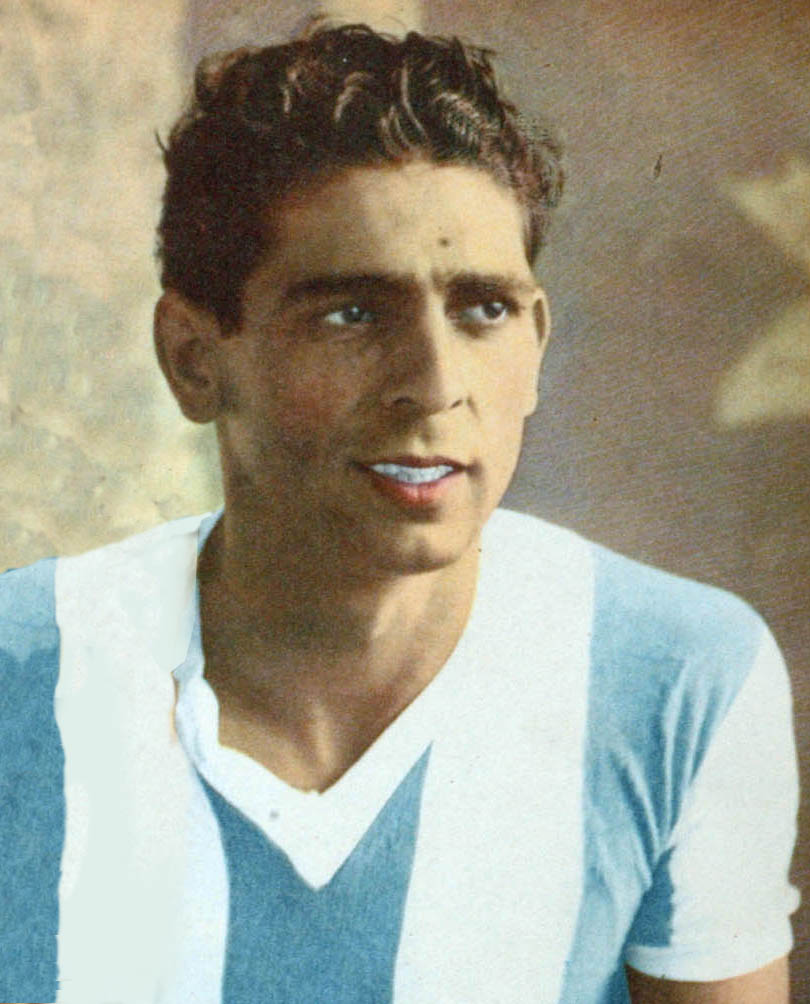
Martino in the Argentina team in 1945

Martino played for Argentina in the 1940s. He made his debut in 1942 in a 4–1 win over Uruguay. He was part of the Argentina squads that won the Copa América in 1945 and 1946. During his time in Italy he also made a single appearance for the Italy national team.

== After retirement ==
In 1964, he served as the president of the Argentine ex-footballers mutual society.

Martino's love of Argentine Tango led him to establish a Casa Porteño called Caño 14 in the 1960s, which featured traditional tango music for 18 years. He died in Buenos Aires on 15 November 2000 at the age of 79.

== Honours ==
=== Club ===
San Lorenzo

- Copa de la República: 1943
- Primera División Argentina: 1946

Juventus

- Serie A: 1949–50

Nacional

- Uruguayan Championship: 1950, 1952

=== International ===
Argentina

- Copa América: 1945, 1946

== See also ==
- Oriundo
