= Heleno de Freitas =

Brazilian footballer (1920–1959)

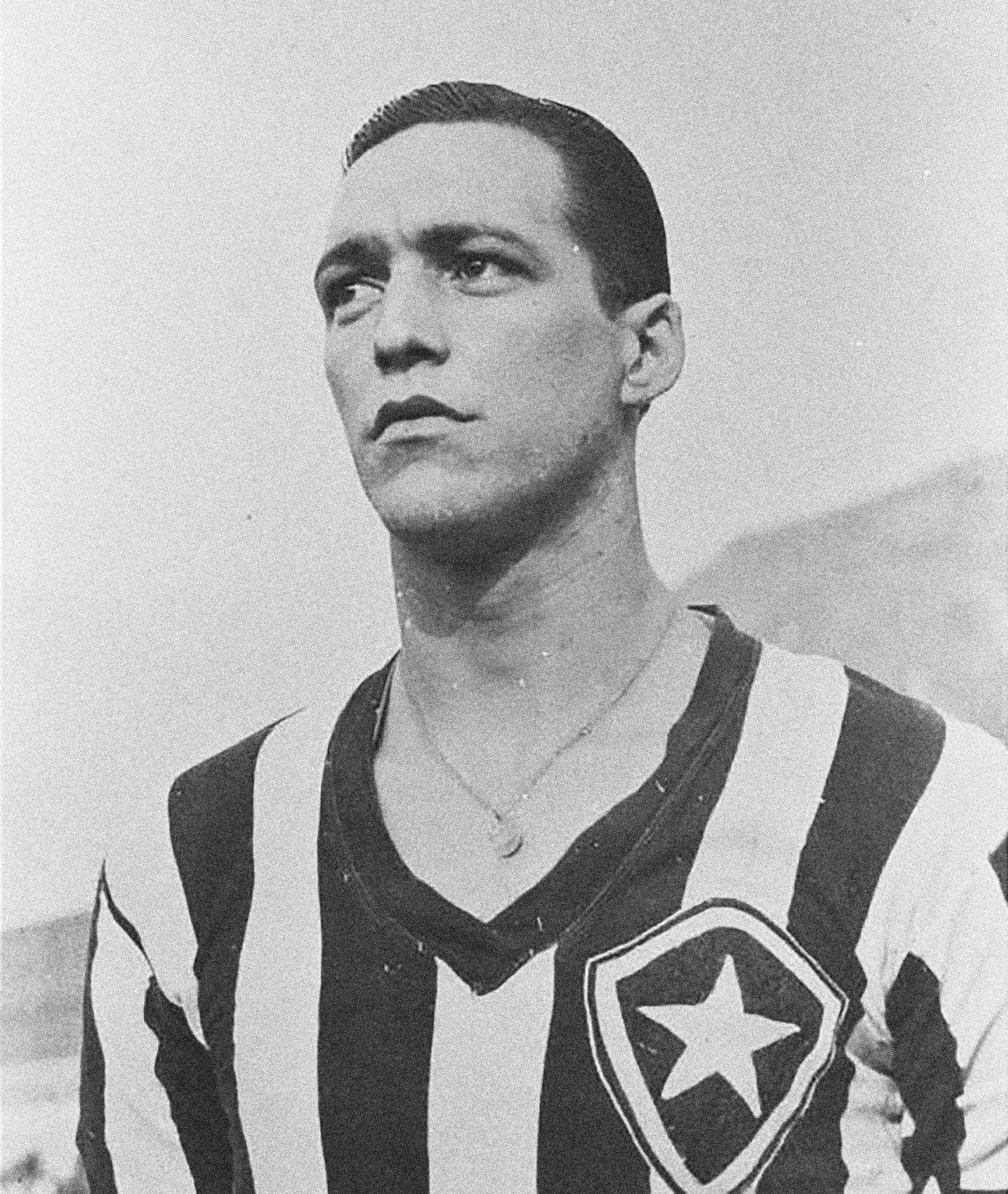
- Heleno de Freitas in Botafogo

Personal information
- Date of birth: 12 February 1920
- Place of birth: São João Nepomuceno, Brazil
- Date of death: 8 November 1959 (aged 39)
- Place of death: Barbacena, Brazil
- Height: 1.82 m (6 ft 0 in)
- Position: Forward

Youth career
- 1927–1931: Mangueira
- 1931–1935: Madureira
- 1935–1936: Botafogo
- 1936–1939: Fluminense

Senior career*
Years	Team	Apps	(Gls)
1939–1948	Botafogo	235	(209)
1948	Boca Juniors	17	(7)
1949–1950	Vasco da Gama	24	(19)
1950	Atlético Junior	15	(9)
1951	Santos	0	(0)
1951	América	1	(0)
Total		292	(244)

International career
1944–1948	Brazil	18	(14)
- * Club domestic league appearances and goals

Heleno de Freitas (12 February 1920 – 8 November 1959) was a Brazilian footballer who played as a forward.

== Early life ==
De Freitas was born into a rich Brazilian family in São João de Nepomuceno, in the state of Minas Gerais, on 12 February 1920. Prior to becoming a footballer, he was looking to pursue a career as a lawyer, and even obtained a law degree. He began playing beach football in amateur tournaments. He was signed by Botafogo at the age of 15.

== Club career ==
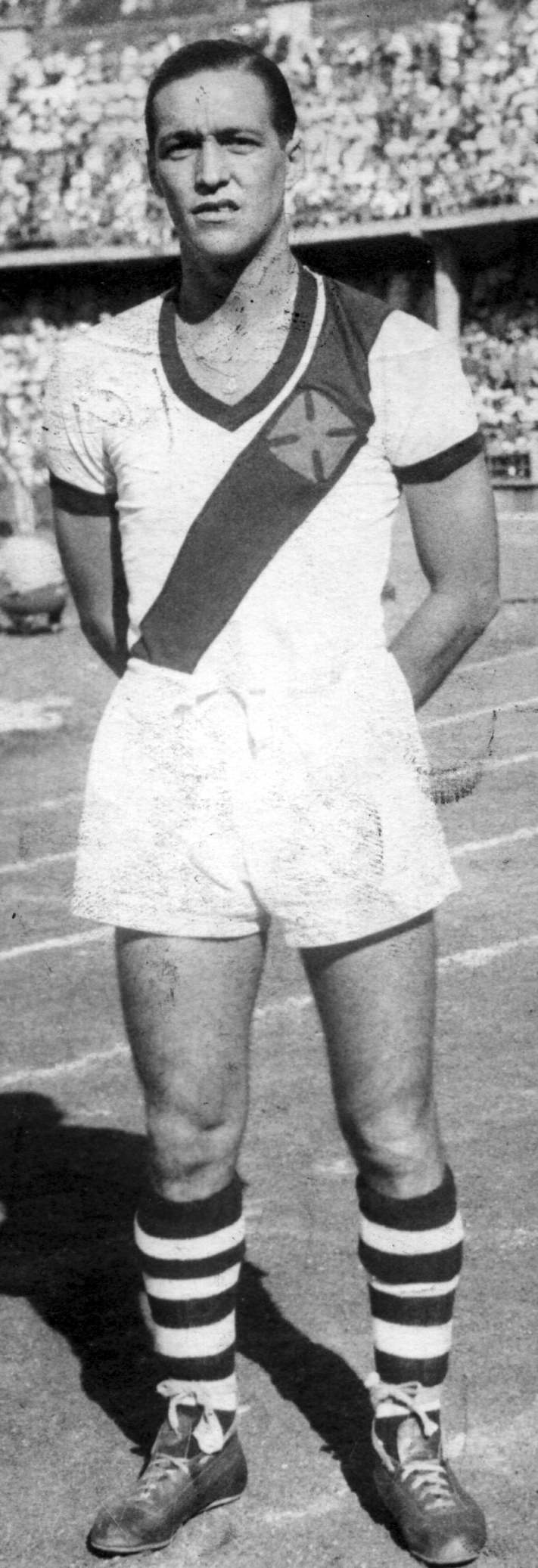
Heleno with Vasco da Gama. He played there from 1949 to 1950

De Freitas spent most of his club career with Botafogo, scoring 209 goals in 235 matches for the club, most with his head. In 1948 he transferred to Boca Juniors in Argentina, but returned to Brazil the following year, winning the 1949 Campeonato Carioca with Vasco. He also had a spell in Colombia with Atlético Junior, before ending his career with América in Rio, after a very short stint at Santos; he played only one match for America, on 4 November 1951, during which he was sent off after only 25 minutes of play for insulting his teammates, and it was his first and last game in the Maracanã.

== International career ==
De Freitas scored 19 goals in 18 appearances for Brazil between 1944 and 1948 (a rare average of more than one goal per game) as the team finished runners-up in both the 1945 and 1946 Copa América championships. He was joint top goalscorer in the 1945 edition of the tournament, alongside Argentine Norberto Doroteo Méndez, with six goals. He was left off of the Brazilian team that took part at the 1950 FIFA World Cup on home soil, however, as he was considered to be past his prime.

== Style of play ==
Described as a "tall and elegant striker" by Christopher Atkins of Bleacher Report, and as "Brazil's Pelé in the 40s" and "the prince of Rio" by Jonathan Wilson of The Guardian, De Freitas is regarded as one of the most talented footballers of all time, and was known for his entertaining playing style, although he was also a perfectionist and a highly competitive player, who often served as a captain. Despite his temperament, he struggled to cope with pressure at times, and had difficulties with controlling his nerves and temper, which occasionally led him to commit rash challenges; moreover, he was notorious for his lack of discipline, poor work-rate, inconsistency, and rebellious character, which caused him problems with his managers, teammates, opponents, and officials, and as a result, he was frequently sent off and suspended throughout his career due to his involvement in several controversial incidents and altercations. His problems in his personal life and bohemian lifestyle off the pitch also had a negative impact on his performances in his later career.

He started out playing on the beach as a hard–tackling central defender or as a central defensive midfielder in his youth; however, during his time with the Fluminense youth side, his manager Carlo Carlomagno decided to deploy him as a centre-forward, in order to limit his possibility of committing fouls and being booked.

He excelled in this new attacking role, due to his speed, technique, vision, passing, intelligence, positioning, ability to read the game, heading, and accurate finishing ability with his feet, which made him a prolific goalscorer. Although he primarily played upfront, he was often known for dropping into midfield in order to retrieve the ball, as he preferred to play with the ball at his feet. He was also known for his ability to lose his markers and get into positions from which he could receive the ball and shoot, as well as his ability to play with his back to goal. Heleno was later nicknamed The Cursed Prince.

== Personal life and death ==
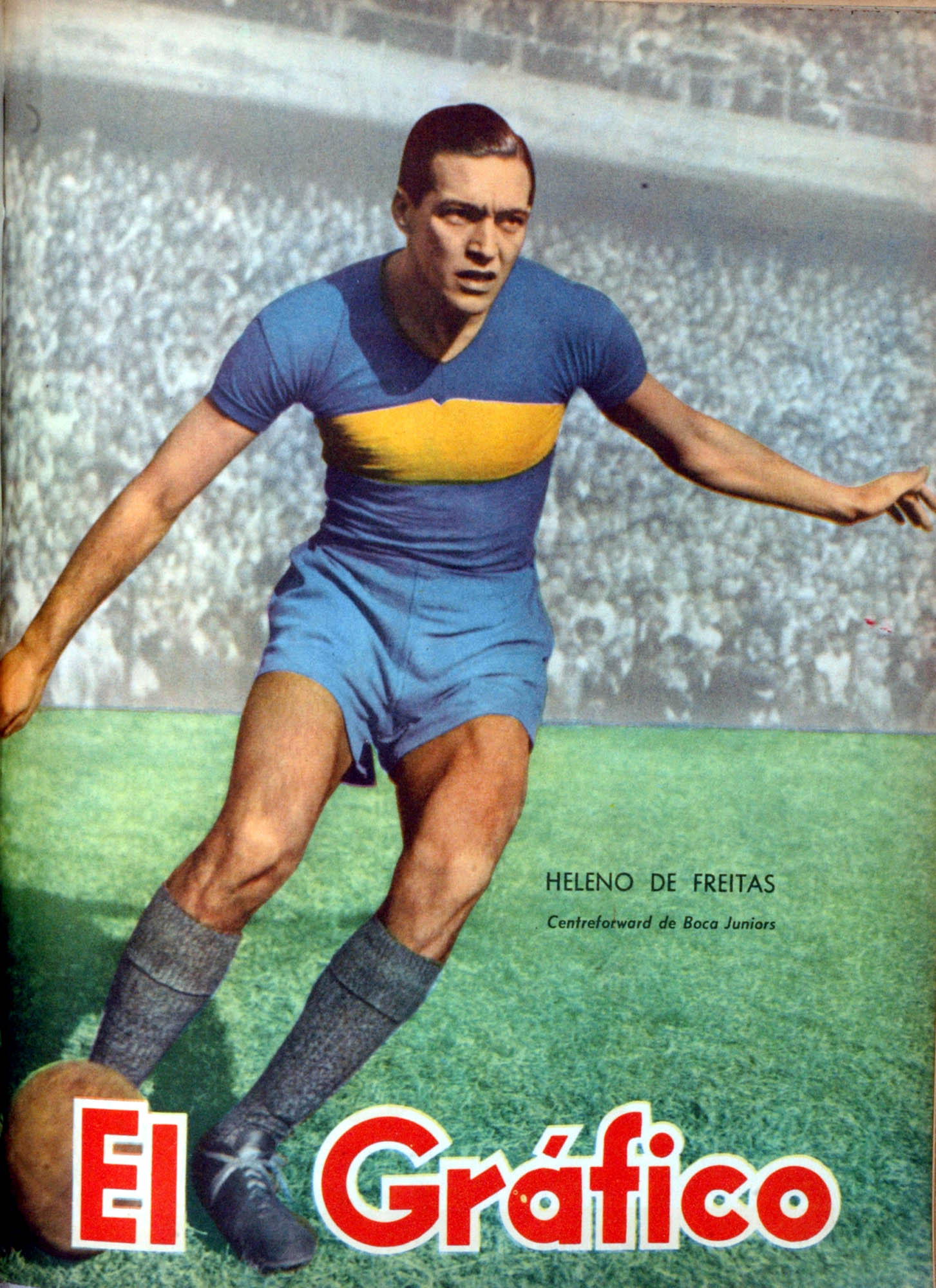
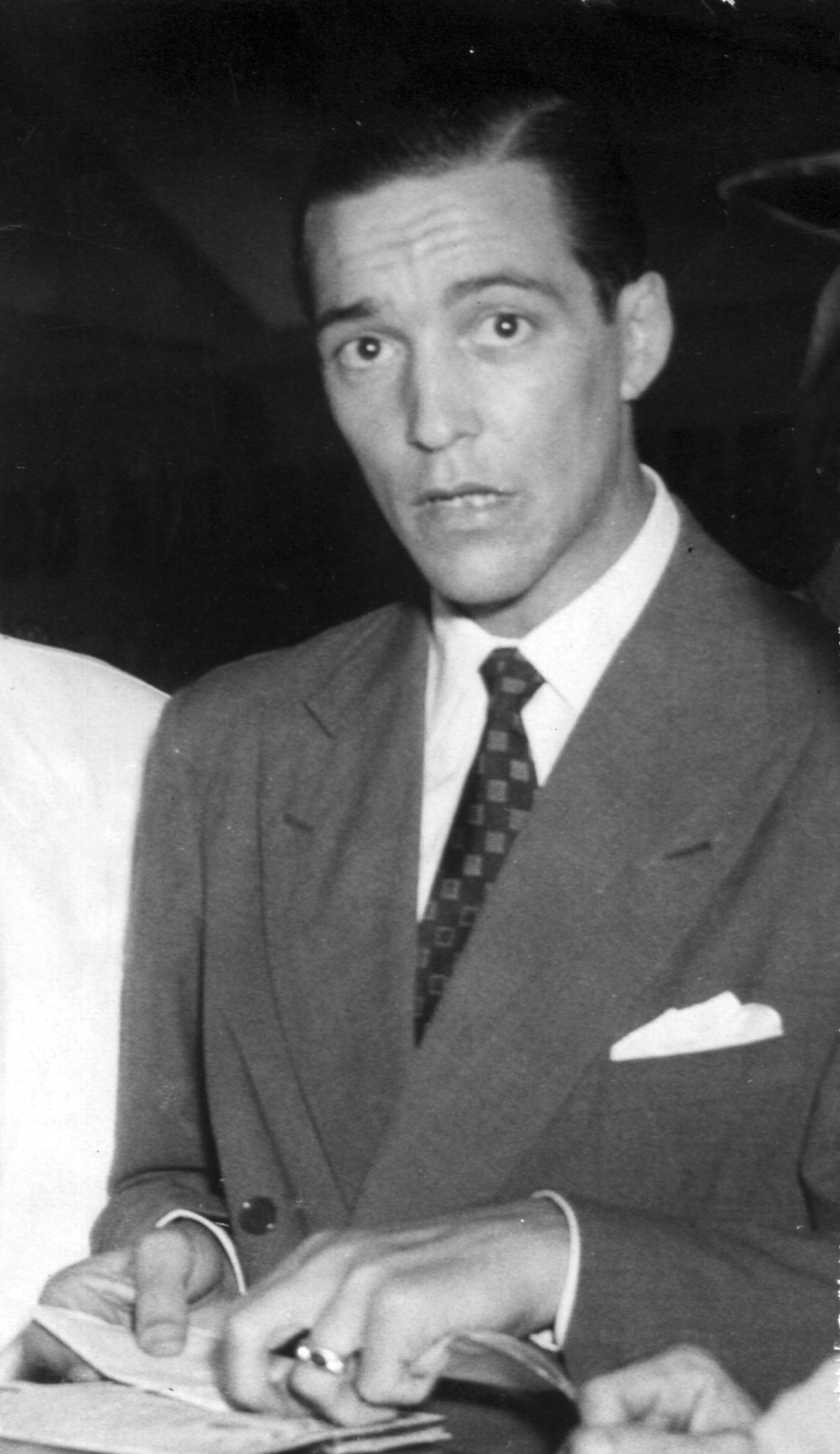
(Left): Heleno covered on Argentine magazine El Gráfico during his tenure on Boca Juniors, 1948; (right): de Freitas in his later years

De Freitas was married to Ilma; the pair eventually split, and she went on to marry Heleno's best friend. Throughout his career, he was notorious for his turbulent lifestyle off the pitch; he was known to be a womaniser, and would often stay out all night and spend the evenings in ballrooms. He also smoked, drank, and was known for gambling. Moreover, he struggled with drug addiction as well as mental health issues. He died from complications related to late-stage, untreated syphilis in 1959 in a sanatorium in Barbacena, at the age of 39.

== Legacy ==
A biography of de Freitas, Nunca houve um homem como Heleno (There was never a man like Heleno), by Marcos Eduardo Neves, was first published in 2006. The title of is a reference to his mocking nickname "Gilda". He was nicknamed after Rita Hayworth's iconic character in the eponymous film due to his good looks and hot temper; the poster for the film included the caption "There never was a woman like Gilda". During his time playing in Colombia, De Freitas met Gabriel García Márquez, who was a young journalist at the time; regarding De Freitas, Márquez commented: "As a football player, Heleno de Freitas could blow hot and cold. But he was more than just a centre-forward. He was a permanent opportunity for others to speak ill of him." In Colombia a Colombian writer and sports reporter Andrés Salcedo wrote a Book namely El día en que el Fútbol Murió: Triunfo y tragedia de un dios (meaning: "The day when football died: Triumph and tragedy of a god") including Heleno de Freitas as the main character.

In 2012, Brazilian filmmaker José Henrique Fonseca released a film based on the life of Heleno de Freitas. The film was titled Heleno and stars Rodrigo Santoro as Heleno de Freitas. The film's focus is more on Heleno de Freitas' personal life, particularly his decline into ether addiction and mental illness, rather than presenting his achievements on the football field.

== Honours ==
=== Club ===
Botafogo

- Torneio Inicio: 1947
- Campeonato Carioca de Aspirantes: 1944, 1945
- Campeonato Carioca de Amadores: 1944, 1943, 1944
- Copa Burgos: 1941
- Taça Prefeito Dr. Durval Neves da Rocha: 1942

Vasco da Gama

- Rio de Janeiro State League champion: 1949
- Campeonato Carioca de Aspirantes: 1949

Santos

- Quadrangular de Belo Horizonte: 1951

=== International ===
Brazil

- Roca Cup champion: 1945
- Rio Branco Cup champion: 1947
- Copa América runner-up: 1945, 1946

=== Individual ===
- Campeonato Carioca top-scorer: 1942
- Copa América top-scorer: 1945

== Bibliography ==
- Neves, Marcos Eduardo (2006). Nunca houve um homem como Heleno [There was never a man like Heleno] (in Portuguese). Rio de Janeiro: Ediouro Publicações. p. 327. ISBN 85-00-01683-3.
