= Jorge Araya (footballer, born 1924) =

Chilean footballer

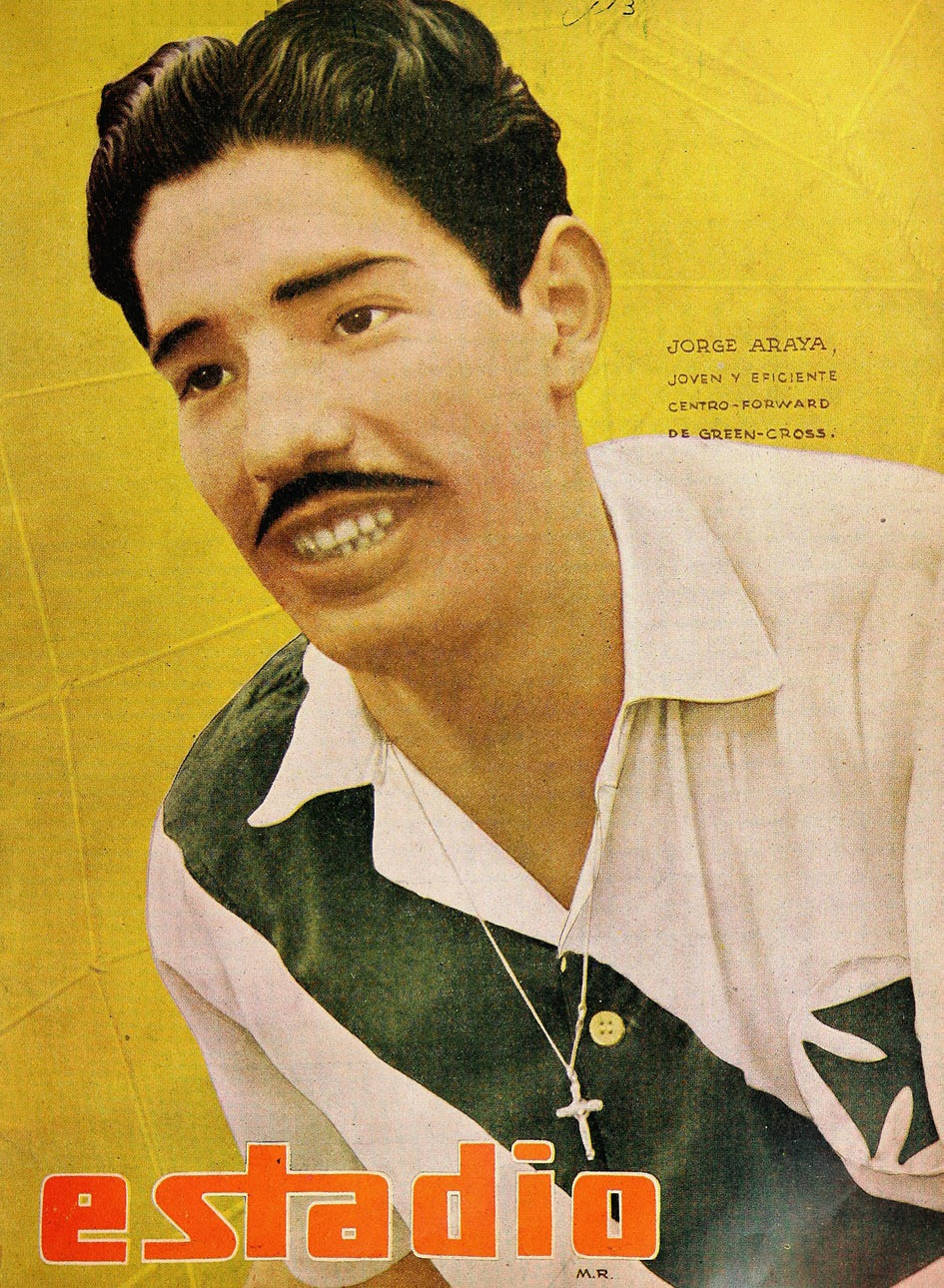
- Araya in 1945

Personal information
- Full name: Jorge Benjamín Araya Quezada
- Date of birth: 21 September 1924
- Date of death: 28 December 1992 (aged 68)
- Position: Forward

Youth career
- Green Cross

Senior career*
Years	Team	Apps	(Gls)
1944–1947	Green Cross		
1948–1950	Universidad de Chile	52	(32)
1952	Green Cross		

International career
1946–1947	Chile	8	(3)
- * Club domestic league appearances and goals

Jorge Benjamín Araya Quezada (21 September 1924 – 28 December 1992) was a Chilean footballer who played as a forward.

== Career ==
A product of Green Cross, Araya played for them until 1947 and also in 1952, winning the league title in 1945, and Universidad de Chile from 1948 to 1950.

At international level, he played in eight matches for the Chile national football team from 1946 to 1947. He was also part of Chile's squad for the 1947 South American Championship.

== Honours ==
Green Cross

- Chilean Primera División: 1945
