= 1943 in Brazilian football =

Football in Brazil
- Season: 1943

The following article presents a summary of the 1943 football (soccer) season in Brazil, which was the 42nd season of competitive football in the country.

== Campeonato Paulista ==
Final Standings

Position	Team	Points	Played	Won	Drawn	Lost	For	Against	Difference
1	São Paulo	33	20	15	3	2	63	22	41
2	Corinthians	32	20	15	2	3	71	28	43
3	Palmeiras	31	20	14	3	3	53	20	33
4	Juventus	23	20	9	5	6	49	31	18
5	Ypiranga-SP	23	20	11	1	8	41	40	1
6	Santos	21	20	10	1	9	45	39	6
7	Portuguesa	21	20	9	3	8	39	34	5
8	Comercial-SP	12	20	5	2	13	37	53	-16
9	Portuguesa Santista	10	20	4	2	14	32	81	-49
10	São Paulo Railway	9	20	4	1	15	38	77	-39
11	Jabaquara	5	20	2	1	17	30	73	-43

São Paulo declared as the Campeonato Paulista champions.

== State championship champions ==
State	Champion	State	Champion
Acre	-	Paraíba	Ástrea
Alagoas	not disputed	Paraná	Atlético Paranaense
Amapá	-	Pernambuco	Sport Recife
Amazonas	Rio Negro	Piauí	Flamengo-PI
Bahia	Galícia	Rio de Janeiro	Icaraí
Ceará	Maguari	Rio de Janeiro (DF)	Flamengo
Espírito Santo	Vitória-ES	Rio Grande do Norte	Santa Cruz-RN
Goiás	-	Rio Grande do Sul	Internacional
Maranhão	Maranhão	Rondônia	-
Mato Grosso	Mixto	Santa Catarina	Avaí
Minas Gerais	Cruzeiro	São Paulo	São Paulo
Pará	Paysandu	Sergipe	Sergipe

== Other competition champions ==
Competition	Champion
Campeonato Brasileiro de Seleções Estaduais	Rio de Janeiro (DF)

== Brazil national team ==
The Brazil national football team did not play any matches in 1943.
