= Jorginho (footballer, born 1924) =

Brazilian footballer (born 1924)

Personal information
- Full name: Jorge Ceciliano
- Date of birth: 30 May 1924
- Place of birth: Rio de Janeiro, Brazil
- Date of death: Unknown
- Position: Midfielder

International career
Years	Team	Apps	(Gls)
1945	Brazil	3	(1)
Medal record
South American Championship
Silver medal – second place	1945 Chile	Runner-up

Jorge Ceciliano (born 30 May 1924), known as just Jorginho, was a Brazilian footballer.

== Career ==
He represented the Brazil national football team in three matches in 1945 and was part of Brazil's squad that finished as runners-up in the 1945 South American Championship.

== Death ==
Jorginho is deceased, though the exact date and place of his death are unknown.
