= 1946 South American Championship =

Football tournament

Tournament details
- Host country: Argentina
- Dates: 12 January – 10 February
- Teams: 6 (from 1 confederation)
- Venues: 3 (in 2 host cities)

Final positions
- Champions: Argentina (8th title)
- Runners-up: Brazil
- Third place: Paraguay
- Fourth place: Uruguay

Tournament statistics
- Matches played: 15
- Goals scored: 61 (4.07 per match)
- Top scorer(s): (Uruguay) José María Medina (7 goals)

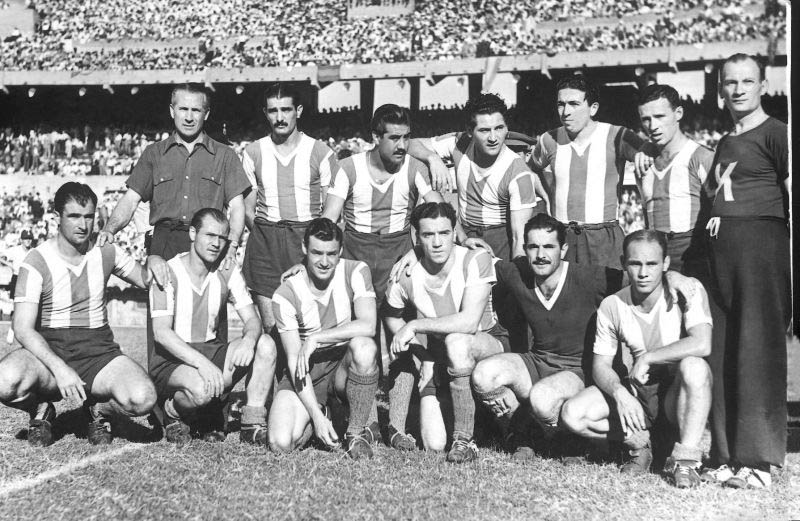
The Argentina team that beat Brazil 2–0 in the final

The nineteenth edition of the South American Championship in football was held in Buenos Aires, Argentina from 12 January to 10 February. This tournament, an extra edition with no trophy handed to the winners, is considered official by CONMEBOL.

The participating countries were Argentina, Brazil, Bolivia, Chile, Paraguay, and Uruguay.

Colombia, Ecuador, and Peru withdrew from the tournament.

== Venues ==
Buenos Aires		Avellaneda
Estadio Monumental	Estadio Gasómetro	Estadio Independiente
Capacity: 67,664	Capacity: 75,000	Capacity: 57,858

== Final round ==
Each team played against each of the other teams. Two points were awarded for a win, one point for a draw and zero points for a defeat.

Team	Pld	W	D	L	GF	GA	GD	Pts
Argentina	5	5	0	0	17	3	+14	10
Brazil	5	3	1	1	13	7	+6	7
Paraguay	5	2	1	2	8	8	0	5
Uruguay	5	2	0	3	11	9	+2	4
Chile	5	2	0	3	8	11	−3	4
Bolivia	5	0	0	5	4	23	−19	0

12 January 1946

Argentina	2–0	Paraguay
De la Mata 6'; Martino 43'

Estadio Monumental, Buenos Aires
Referee: Mário Vianna (Brazil)

16 January 1946

Brazil	3–0	Bolivia
Heleno 47', 78'; Zizinho 65'

Gasómetro de Boedo, Buenos Aires
Referee: José Bartolomé Macías (Argentina)

16 January 1946

Uruguay	1–0	Chile
Medina 34'

Gasómetro de Boedo, Buenos Aires
Referee: Mário Vianna (Brazil)

19 January 1946

Chile	2–1	Paraguay
Araya 48'; Cremaschi 68'		Rolón 14'

Gasómetro de Boedo, Buenos Aires
Referee: Nobel Valentini (Uruguay)

19 January 1946

Argentina	7–1	Bolivia
Labruna 34', 89'; Méndez 39', 60'; Salvini 75', 84'; Loustau 79'		Peredo 67'

Gasómetro de Boedo, Buenos Aires
Referee: Higinio Madrid (Chile)

23 January 1946

Brazil	4–3	Uruguay
Jair 1', 16'; Heleno 39'; Chico 44'		Medina 25', 70'; Vázquez 37'

Gasómetro de Boedo, Buenos Aires
Referee: Cayetano de Nicola (Paraguay)

26 January 1946

Paraguay	4–2	Bolivia
Genés 30'; Benítez Cáceres 44'; Villalba 67', 88'		Coronel 20' (o.g.); González 42'

Estadio Monumental, Buenos Aires
Referee: José Bartolomé Macías (Argentina)

26 January 1946

Argentina	3–1	Chile
Labruna 39', 60'; Pedernera 65'		Alcántara 85'

Estadio Monumental, Buenos Aires
Referee: Nobel Valentini (Uruguay)

29 January 1946

Uruguay	5–0	Bolivia
Medina 1', 25', 30', 78'; García 75'

Estadio Independiente, Avellaneda
Referee: Higinio Madrid (Chile)

29 January 1946

Brazil	1–1	Paraguay
Norival 63'		Villalba 31'

Estadio Independiente, Avellaneda
Referee: José Bartolomé Macías (Argentina)

2 February 1946

Argentina	3–1	Uruguay
Pedernera 8'; Labruna 46'; Méndez 72'		Riephoff 59'

Gasómetro de Boedo, Buenos Aires
Referee: Mário Vianna (Brazil)

3 February 1946

Brazil	5–1	Chile
Zizinho 4', 41', 46', 71'; Chico 89'		Salfate 84' (pen.)

Gasómetro de Boedo, Buenos Aires
Referee: Nobel Valentini (Uruguay)

8 February 1946

Chile	4–1	Bolivia
Araya 9', 39'; Cremaschi 49', 78'		Peredo 50'

Gasómetro de Boedo, Buenos Aires
Referee: José Bartolomé Macías (Argentina)

8 February 1946

Paraguay	2–1	Uruguay
Villalba 37'; Rodríguez 75'		Schiaffino 57'

Gasómetro de Boedo, Buenos Aires
Referee: Mário Vianna (Brazil)

10 February 1946

Argentina	2–0	Brazil
Méndez 14', 20'

Estadio Monumental, Buenos Aires
Referee: Nobel Valentini (Uruguay)

== Result ==
1946 South American Championship champions

Argentina
Eighth title

== Goal scorers ==
7 Goals

- (Uruguay) José M. Medina

5 goals

- (Argentina) Ángel Labruna
- (Argentina) Norberto Méndez
- (Brazil) Zizinho

4 goals

- (Paraguay) Juan Villalba

3 goals

- (Brazil) Heleno
- (Chile) Araya
- (Chile) Atilio Cremaschi

2 goals

- (Argentina) Adolfo Pedernera
- (Argentina) Juan C. Salvini
- (Bolivia) Miguel Peredo
- (Brazil) Chico
- (Brazil) Jair

1 goal

- (Argentina) Vicente De la Mata
- (Argentina) Félix Loustau
- (Argentina) Rinaldo Martino
- (Bolivia) Zenón González
- (Brazil) Norival
- (Chile) Juan Alcántara
- (Chile) Santiago Salfate
- (Paraguay) Delfín Benítez Cáceres
- (Paraguay) Alejandrino Genés
- (Paraguay) Albino Rodríguez
- (Paraguay) Porfirio Rolón
- (Uruguay) José García
- (Uruguay) José A. Vázquez
- (Uruguay) Juan P. Riephoff
- (Uruguay) Raúl Schiaffino

Own goal

- (Paraguay) Doroteo Coronel (for Bolivia)
