= Salvador Calvente =

Argentine footballer

Personal information
- Full name: Salvador Calvente
- Date of birth: 29 January 1922
- Place of birth: Lanús, Argentina
- Date of death: 18 April 2008 (aged 86)
- Position: Defender

Youth career
- Lanús

Senior career*
Years	Team	Apps	(Gls)
1944–1951	Lanús	126	(0)
1954	Huracán		
1955–1957	O'Higgins		
1958	Green Cross		

Managerial career
- 1957: O'Higgins (player-manager)
- * Club domestic league appearances and goals

Salvador Calvente (29 January 1922 – 18 April 2008) was an Argentine football defender and manager.

== Playing career ==
Born in Lanús, Buenos Aires, Argentina, Calvente was trained at local club, Club Atlético Lanús, and made his senior debut in 1944. They were relegated to the Argentine second level by first time in 1949 with Calvente as team captain and returned to the Argentine Primera División a year later after winning the 1950 Primera B.

Calvente made 136 appearances in total for Lanús until 1951 and switched to Huracán for the 1954 season.

Calvente ended his career in Chile with O'Higgins between 1955 and 1957, taking part in the first season at the Chilean Primera División for the club, and Green Cross in 1958.

== Coaching career ==
Calvente served as player-manager of O'Higgins in 1957.

== Death ==
Calvente died on 18 April 2008.
