= Ermanno Scaramuzzi =

Italian footballer (1927–1991)

Personal information
- Date of birth: 2 December 1927
- Place of birth: Biella, Italy
- Date of death: 2 July 1991 (aged 63)
- Position: Striker

Senior career*
Years	Team	Apps	(Gls)
1941–1942	Biellese	1	(0)
1942–1943	Ponzone		
1945–1946	Ponzone		
1946–1949	Biellese	43	(18)
1949–1950	Juventus	3	(0)
1950–1951	Atalanta	12	(1)
1951–1952	Juventus	1	(0)
1952–1953	Brescia	24	(8)
1953–1956	Verona	62	(13)
1956–1957	Salernitana	19	(3)

Managerial career
- 1967–1968: Biellese
- * Club domestic league appearances and goals

Ermanno Scaramuzzi (2 December 1927 – 2 July 1991) was an Italian professional football player and coach.

== Honours ==
Juventus

- Serie A: 1949–50, 1951–52
