= José García (Uruguayan footballer) =

Uruguayan footballer (1926-2011)

Personal information
- Date of birth: 21 February 1926
- Date of death: 8 January 2011 (aged 84)
- Position: Midfielder

International career
Years	Team	Apps	(Gls)
1945–1948	Uruguay	22	(4)

José García (21 February 1926 – 8 January 2011) was a Uruguayan footballer. He played in 22 matches for the Uruguay national football team from 1945 to 1948. He was also part of Uruguay's squad for the 1945 South American Championship.
