= Zila-ye Aliasgar =

Zila-ye Aliasgar زيلاعلي عسگر
- Village
- Location within Iran
- Coordinates: 32°22′48″N 49°41′02″E
- Country: Iran
- Province: Khuzestan
- County: Andika
- Bakhsh: Chelo
- Rural District: Chelo

Population (2006)
  - Total: 194
- Time zone: UTC+3:30 (IRST)
  - Summer (DST): UTC+4:30 (IRDT)

Zila-ye Aliasgar (Persian: زيلاعلي عسگر, also Romanized as Zīlā-ye ʿAlīʿasgar) is a village in Chelo Rural District, Chelo District, Andika County, Khuzestan Province, Iran. At the 2006 census, its population was 194, in 31 families.
