= Mihály Kincses =

Hungarian footballer

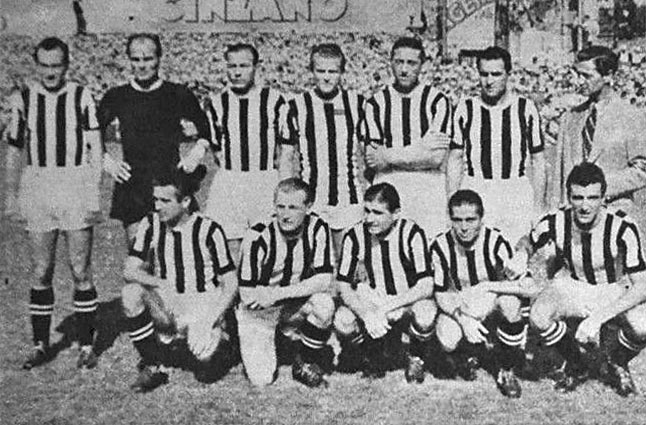
- Mihály Kincses (front row, second from left) as part of Juventus in 1947

Personal information
- Date of birth: 8 April 1918
- Place of birth: Budapest, Hungary
- Height: 1.72 m (5 ft 7 1/2 in)
- Position: Midfielder

Youth career
- 1930–1934: Kőbányai EAC

Senior career*
| Years | Team | Apps | (Gls) |
| 1934–1937 | Drasche | | |
| 1937–1938 | Kispesti Textil SE | | |
| 1938–1941 | Kispest | | |
| 1941–1945 | Gamma | | |
| 1945–1946 | Kispest | | |
| 1946–1947 | Atalanta | 21 | (9) |
| 1947–1948 | Juventus | 24 | (5) |
| 1948–1949 | Bari | 32 | (5) |
| 1949–1952 | Lucchese | 60 | (25) |
| 1952–1954 | Salernitana | 32 | (8) |
| 1954–1955 | Cavese | | |

International career
| 1939–1943 | Hungary | 17 | (2) |
- * Club domestic league appearances and goals

Mihály Kincses (born 8 April 1918, in Budapest) was a Hungarian professional football player.
