= 1945 South American Championship =

Football tournament

Tournament details
- Host country: Chile
- Dates: 14 January – 28 February 1945
- Teams: 7
- Venue(s): Campos de Sports, Santiago

Final positions
- Champions: Argentina (7th title)
- Runners-up: Brazil
- Third place: Chile
- Fourth place: Uruguay

Tournament statistics
- Matches played: 21
- Goals scored: 89 (4.24 per match)
- Top scorer(s): (Brazil) Heleno de Freitas (Argentina) Norberto Méndez (6 goals each)

The 1945 South American Championship (Spanish: Campeonato Sudamericano 1945, Portuguese: Campeonato Sul-Americano de 1945) was the 18th international association football championship for members of the Confederación Sudamericana de Fútbol (CONMEBOL). Hosted by Chile, the competition ran from 14 January – 28 February 1945 and was contested by the national teams of Argentina, Bolivia, Brazil, Chile, Colombia, Ecuador and Uruguay.

Argentina won the competition for the seventh time after Brazil won 1–0 against Chile in the final round of match of the round-robin tournament.

== Background ==
In 1910, the Asociación del Fútbol Argentino (AFA) organised a tournament to mark the 100th anniversary of the May Revolution. The Copa Centenario Revolución de Mayo was contested by the national teams of Argentina, Chile and Uruguay and is considered to be a precursor to the South American Championship. Six years later, the AFA organised a second tournament, this time to celebrate the centenary of the Argentine Declaration of Independence. Alongside the three who had contested the Copa Centenario Revolución de Mayo, Brazil were invited to compete and the South American Championship was born. During the competition, the four associations of the competing teams met on 9 July 1916 and founded the Confederación Sudamericana de Fútbol (CONMEBOL).

Uruguay were the defending champions having won the 1942 edition after defeating Argentina 1–0 in the final and decisive match. Uruguay were also the most successful team in the history of the competition having won the trophy on eight occasions.

Paraguay and Peru withdrew prior to the start of the competition so only seven of the nine CONMEBOL members would compete.

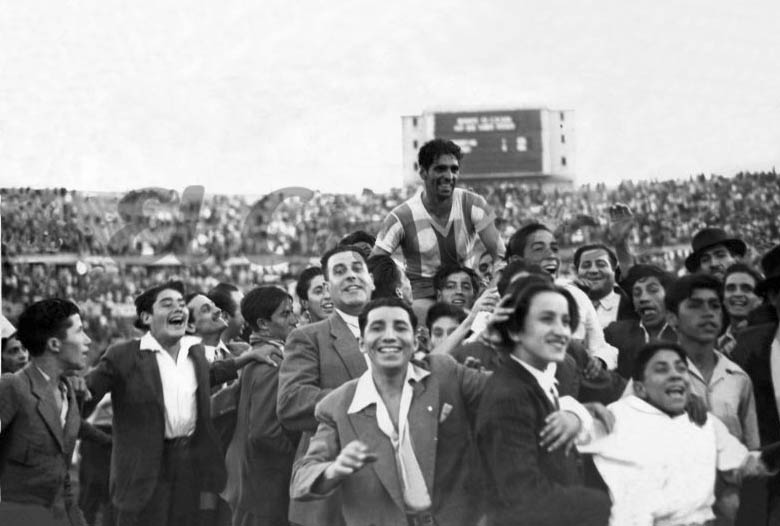
Argentine player Rinaldo Martino being carried by the fans after the 1–0 win v. Uruguay. He scored the only goal

== Format ==
The tournament was played as a round-robin where each team would play all of the others once. The winner would be decided by the total number of points obtained across all matches played. Should two or more teams be tied with the greatest number of points, a play-off would be organised to decide the winner.

=== Participants ===
- Argentina
- Bolivia
- Brazil
- Chile
- Colombia
- Ecuador
- Uruguay

== Venue ==
All matches were held at the Estadio Nacional in Santiago.

Santiago
Estadio Nacional
Capacity: 70,000
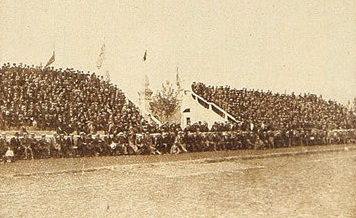

== Summary ==
The competition began on 14 January when a hat-trick from Juan Alcántara helped hosts Chile to a 6–3 win against Ecuador. Four days later, Argentina began the tournament with a 4–0 win against Bolivia and, on 21 January, Brazil defeated Colombia 3–0. Three days later, Chile won 5–0 against Bolivia and defending champions Uruguay recorded a 5–1 win against Ecuador in their first match. On 28 January, Uruguay defeated Colombia 7–0 and Brazil won 2–0 against Bolivia. Three days later, Chile won 2–0 against Colombia and Argentina recorded a 4–2 win against Ecuador. On 7 February, Argentina defeated Colombia 9–1 and Brazil won 3–0 against Uruguay. With just over half the matches played, Argentina, Brazil and Chile were tied at the top of the table with six points from six.

Four days later, Bolivia and Ecuador played out a goalless draw and Chile drew 1–1 with Argentina. On 15 February, Uruguay won 2–0 against Bolivia and Argentina won 3–1 against Brazil to move two points clear at the top. Three days later, Colombia won their first match of the competition by defeating Ecuador 3–1 and Chile defeated 10-man Uruguay 1–0. With four games left to play, Chile and Argentina were tied on nine points at the top, three clear of Brazil. On 21 February, Bolivia and Colombia drew 3–3 and a hat-trick from Ademir helped Brazil to a 9–2 win against Ecuador.

The final two matches were played three days apart on 25 and 28 February. First, Argentina defeated Uruguay 1–0 in their last game to sit two points clear of Chile and eliminate Brazil from the championship permutations. In the last match, Brazil defeated Chile by the same score line to hand the title to Argentina.

== Table ==
Pos	Team	Pld	W	D	L	GF	GA	GD	Pts
1	Argentina	6	5	1	0	22	5	+17	11
2	Brazil	6	5	0	1	19	5	+14	10
3	Chile	6	4	1	1	15	5	+10	9
4	Uruguay	6	3	0	3	14	6	+8	6
5	Colombia	6	1	1	4	7	25	−18	3
6	Bolivia	6	0	2	4	3	16	−13	2
7	Ecuador	6	0	1	5	9	27	−18	1

== Results ==
14 January 1945

Chile	6–3	Ecuador
Alcántara 28', 59', 81'; Vera 29'; Hormazábal 45'; Clavero 70'		Raymondi Chávez 30'; Jiménez 44'; Luis Mendoza 51'

Estadio Nacional, Santiago
Referee: José Bartolomé Macías (Argentina)

18 January 1945

Argentina	4–0	Bolivia
Pontoni 10'; Martino 43'; Loustau 70'; De la Mata 75'

Estadio Nacional, Santiago
Referee: Humberto Reginato (Chile)

21 January 1945

Brazil	3–0	Colombia
Jorginho 13'; Heleno 15'; Jaime 38'

Estadio Nacional, Santiago
Referee: Nobel Valentini (Uruguay)

24 January 1945

Chile	5–0	Bolivia
Clavero 13', 27', 39'; Alcántara 75', 79'

Estadio Nacional, Santiago
Referee: Nobel Valentini (Uruguay)
24 January 1945

Uruguay	5–1	Ecuador
A. García 1', 60', 83'; Porta 28'; Varela 69'		Aguayo 39'

Estadio Nacional, Santiago
Referee: Mário Vianna (Brazil)

28 January 1945

Uruguay	7–0	Colombia
A. García 22', 89'; Riephoff 25'; J. García 37', 83'; Ortiz 75'; Porta 86'

Estadio Nacional, Santiago
Referee: Mário Vianna (Brazil)
28 January 1945

Brazil	2–0	Bolivia
Ademir 48'; Tesourinha 80'

Estadio Nacional, Santiago
Referee: José Bartolomé Macías (Argentina)

31 January 1945

Chile	2–0	Colombia
Medina 48'; Piñeiro 80'

Estadio Nacional, Santiago
Referee: José Bartolomé Macías (Argentina)
31 January 1945

Argentina	4–2	Ecuador
Pontoni 11'; De la Mata 50'; Martino 69'; Pellegrina 83'		Aguayo 53'; J. Mendoza 62'

Estadio Nacional, Santiago
Referee: Nobel Valentini (Uruguay)

7 February 1945

Argentina	9–1	Colombia
Pontoni 3', 7'; Méndez 15', 39'; Martino 27'; Boyé 41'; Loustau 50'; Ferraro 80', 81'		Mendoza 52'

Estadio Nacional, Santiago
Referee: Nobel Valentini (Uruguay)
7 February 1945

Brazil	3–0	Uruguay
Heleno 8', 32'; Rui 20'

Estadio Nacional, Santiago
Referee: José Bartolomé Macías (Argentina)

11 February 1945

Bolivia	0–0	Ecuador

Estadio Nacional, Santiago
Referee: Mário Vianna (Brazil)
11 February 1945

Chile	1–1	Argentina
Medina 3'		Méndez 52'

Estadio Nacional, Santiago
Referee: Nobel Valentini (Uruguay)

15 February 1945

Uruguay	2–0	Bolivia
Falero 26'; Porta 75'

Estadio Nacional, Santiago
Referee: Mário Vianna (Brazil)
15 February 1945

Argentina	3–1	Brazil
Méndez 14', 20', 40'		Ademir 32'

Estadio Nacional, Santiago
Referee: Nobel Valentini (Uruguay)

18 February 1945

Colombia	3–1	Ecuador
González Rubio 2'; Gámez 64'; Berdugo 70'		Aguayo 4'

Estadio Nacional, Santiago
Referee: Nobel Valentini (Uruguay)
18 February 1945

Chile	1–0	Uruguay
Medina 8'

Estadio Nacional, Santiago
Referee: José Bartolomé Macías (Argentina)

21 February 1945

Bolivia	3–3	Colombia
Fernández 57'; Zenón González 75'; Orgaz 80'		González Rubio 3'; Berdugo 7'; Gámez 67'

Estadio Nacional, Santiago
Referee: Mário Vianna (Brazil)
21 February 1945

Brazil	9–2	Ecuador
Ademir 3', 10', 75'; Heleno 22', 28'; Zizinho 40', 65'; Jair 67', 68'		Aguayo 42'; Albornoz 49'

Estadio Nacional, Santiago
Referee: José Bartolomé Macías (Argentina)

25 February 1945

Argentina	1–0	Uruguay
Martino 50'

Estadio Nacional, Santiago
Referee: Juan Las Heras (Chile)

28 February 1945

Brazil	1–0	Chile
Heleno 20'

Estadio Nacional, Santiago
Referee: Nobel Valentini (Uruguay)

== Goalscorers ==
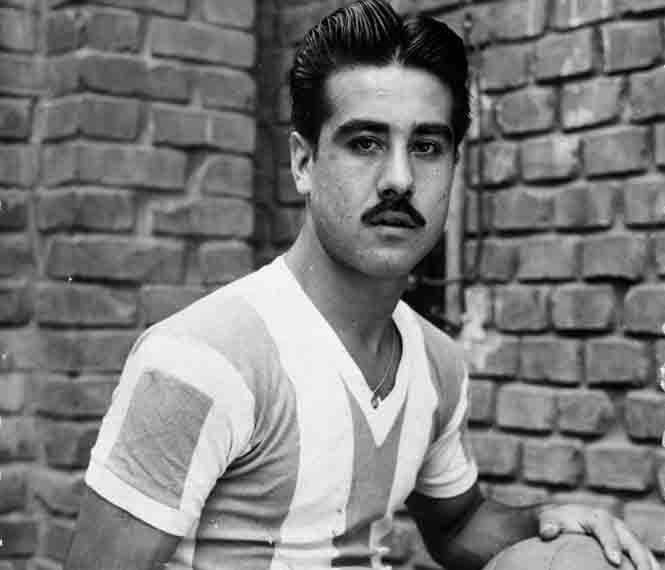
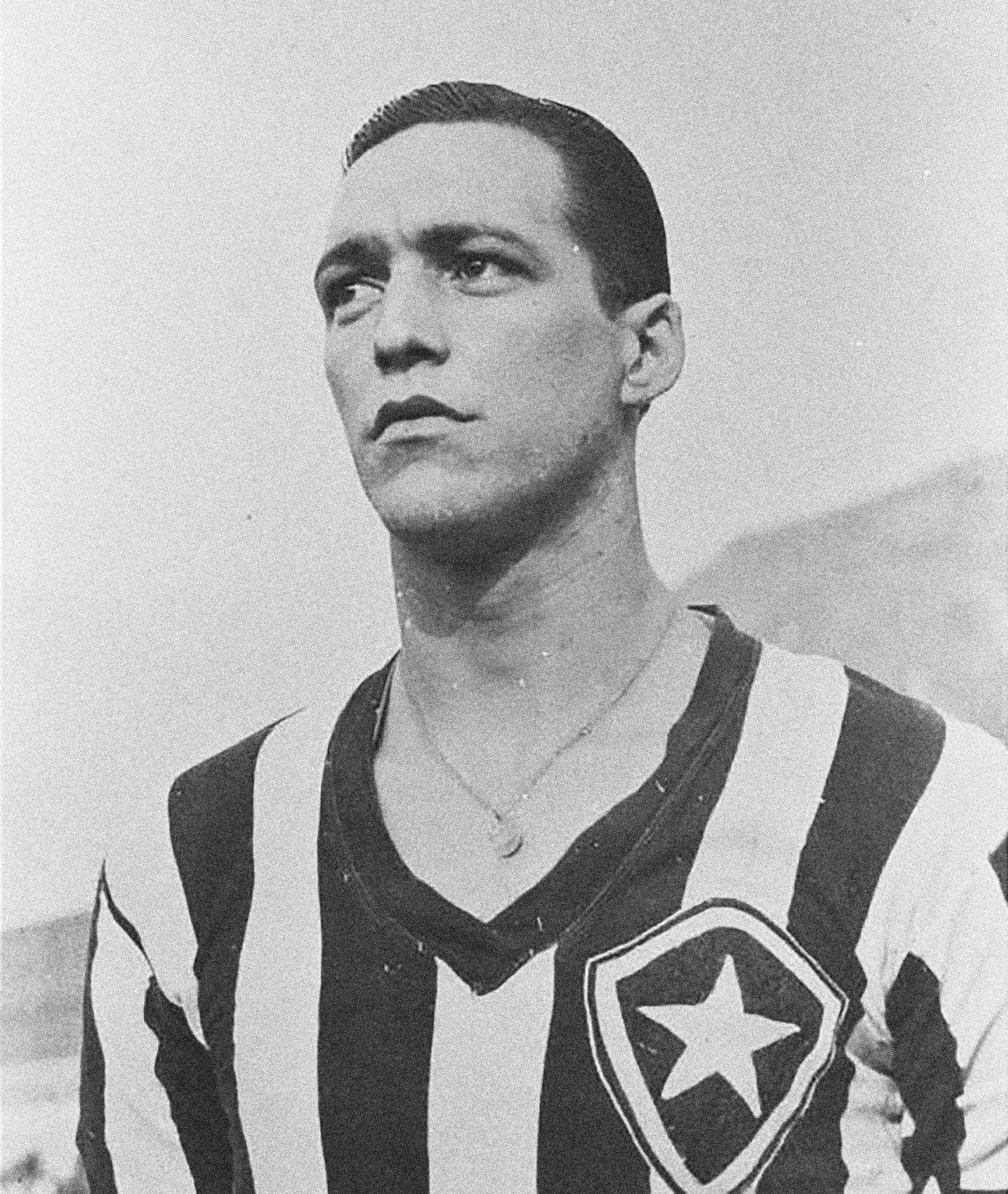
Norberto Méndez (left) and Heleno, top scorers with 6 goals each

There were 89 goals scored in 21 matches, for an average of 4.24 goals per match.

6 goals

- (Argentina) Norberto Méndez
- (Brazil) Heleno

5 goals

- (Brazil) Ademir
- (Chile) Juan Alcántara
- (Uruguay) Atilio García

4 goals

- (Argentina) Rinaldo Martino
- (Argentina) René Pontoni
- (Chile) Guillermo Clavero
- (Ecuador) Víctor Aguayo

3 goals

- (Chile) Desiderio Medina
- (Uruguay) Roberto Porta

2 goals

- (Argentina) Vicente de la Mata
- (Argentina) Juan José Ferraro
- (Argentina) Loustau
- (Brazil) Jair
- (Brazil) Zizinho
- (Colombia) Roberto Gámez
- (Colombia) González Rubio
- (Colombia) Fulgencio Berdugo
- (Uruguay) José García

1 goal

- (Argentina) Mario Boyé
- (Argentina) Manuel Pelegrina
- (Bolivia) Raúl Fernández
- (Bolivia) Zenón González
- (Bolivia) Severo Orgaz
- (Brazil) Jaime
- (Brazil) Jorginho
- (Brazil) Rui
- (Brazil) Tesourinha
- (Chile) Francisco Hormazábal
- (Chile) Manuel Piñero
- (Chile) Erasmo Vera
- (Colombia) Arturo Mendoza
- (Ecuador) Guillermo Albornoz
- (Ecuador) José L. Mendoza
- (Ecuador) José M. Jiménez
- (Ecuador) Luis A. Mendoza
- (Ecuador) Enrique Raymondi
- (Uruguay) Nicolás Falero
- (Uruguay) José M. Ortiz
- (Uruguay) Juan P. Riephoff
- (Uruguay) Obdulio Varela
