= Ronald de Carvalho =

Brazilian writer (1893–1935)

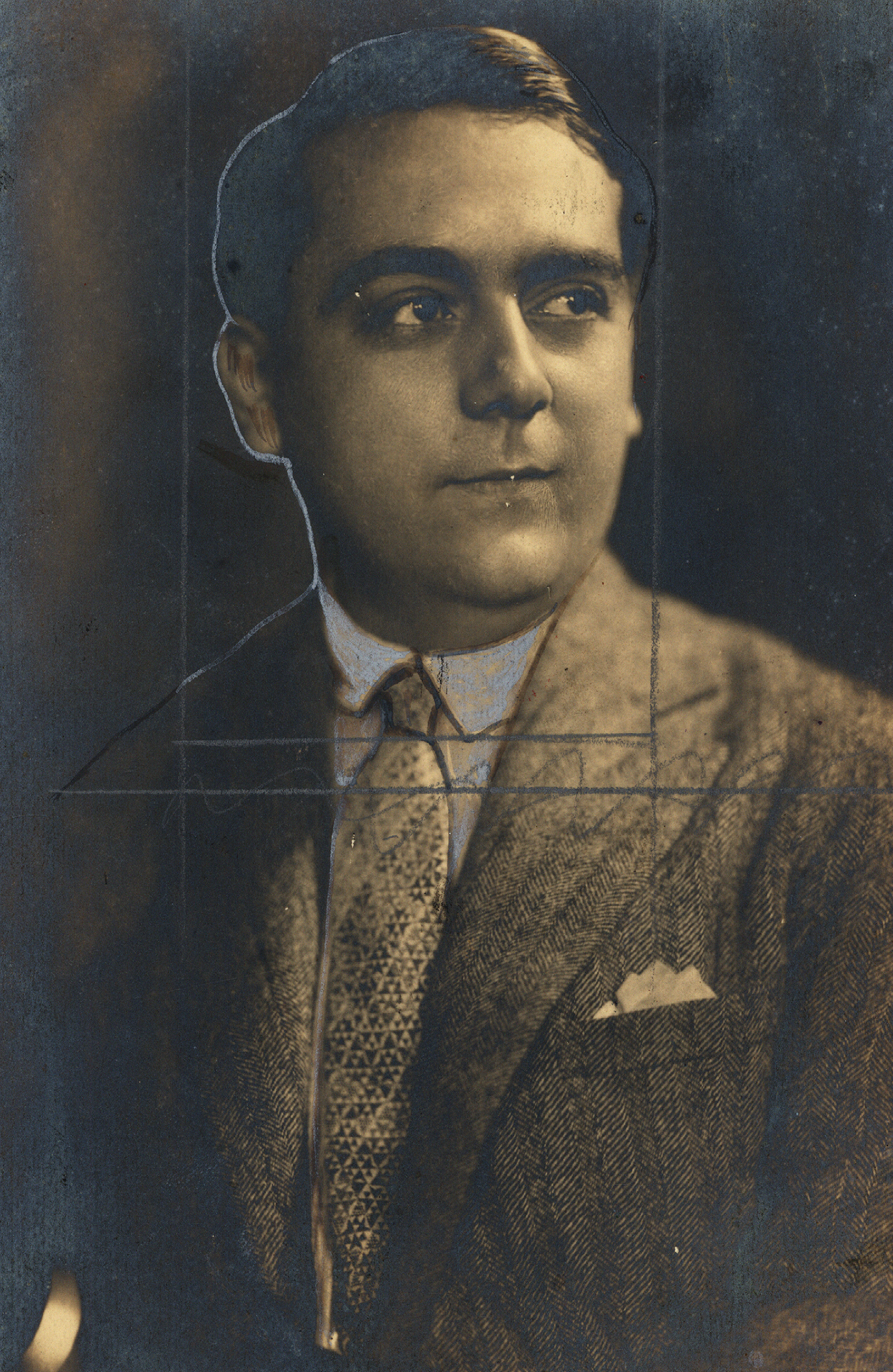
Ronald de Carvalho, 1935

Ronald de Carvalho (May 16, 1893 – February 15, 1935) was a Brazilian poet, writer, politician and diplomat from Rio de Janeiro. A street in Rio is named after him.

== Works ==
- Luz Gloriosa (1913)
- Pequena História da Literatura Brasileira (1919)
- Poemas e Sonetos (1919)
- Epigramas Irônicos e Sentimentais (1922)
- Toda a América (1926)
- Brazil
