= Zila Bezerra =

Brazilian civil servant

Federal Deputy for Acre
- In office 1991–2003

Personal details
- Born: Maria Zila Frota Bezerra de Oliveira; 7 May 1945 (age 81) Rio de Janeiro, Brazil
- Party: Brazilian Democratic Movement; Liberal Front Party
- Spouse: Aluísio Bezerra de Oliveira
- Children: 1
- Education: University of Brasília
- Occupation: Teacher

Maria Zila Frota Bezerra de Oliveira (born 7 May 1945) is a Brazilian teacher and politician of the Brazilian Democratic Movement, later the Liberal Front Party who was a Federal Deputy for Acre in the Chamber of Deputies from 1991 to 2003. She was a member or alternate of several committees, commissions and inquiries. Bezerra was later the mayor of Cruzeiro do Sul.

== Background and early career ==
Bezerra was born to parents Giucippe Genuense Frota and Maria Júlia Lopes Frota in Rio de Janeiro, Brazil on 7 May 1945. She began teaching at the Fundação Educacional do Distrito Federal in Brasília in 1966 and remained there until 1970. In 1970, Bezerra was appointed external control technician at the Tribunal de Contas da União and as a chancellery officer at the Ministry of Foreign Affairs. From 1971 to 1981, she was educated at the Faculty of Arts of the University of Brasília. Bezerra also enrolled at the Sorbonne in Paris, France between 1975 and 1979, studying the French Language and Civilization.

In 1973, she joined the anti-military regime Brazilian Democratic Movement (MDB) political party, having been its coordinator of electoral campaigns in Cruzeiro do Sul, a member of its regional directory in Acre and an alternate to its national directory. Bezerra ventured to Geneva in Switzerland on an official mission of the Itamarati in 1975 and was made achancellery officer of Brazil's diplomatic service in Paris. She was appointed social communication coordinator of Rio Branco under the state government run by Nabor Júnior in 1983, and remained in the post when she was made coordinator of the agricultural development in Juruá Valley in 1985. Bezerra was appointed by governor Flaviano Melo to become Secretary of State for Government Affairs of Acre in Brasília in 1987, remaining in the role until 1990.

== Chamber of Deputies and later career ==
She was elected to serve as the Federal Deputy for Acre in the Chamber of Deputies in the 1990 Brazilian legislative election held that October and took up her seat in February 1991. Bezerra became a full member of the Social Security and Family Commission, the Committee for the Defense of Consumers, the Mixed Commission on Plans, Public Budgets and Inspection, the Mixed CPI Sterilization of Women in Brazil, the Environment and Minorities, the Parliamentary Commission of Inquiry (CPI) on clandestine airports, foreign religious missions, mining in Roraima and the internationalization of the Amazon and an alternate to the Mines and Energy Commission as well as the CPI on Violence Against Women. She was a Chamber of Deputies observer at Earth Summit in Rio de Janeiro in 1992 and at the United Nations General Assembly in New York the following year. Bezerra voted to impeach President Fernando Collor de Mello for corruption on 29 September 1992, voted to create the Emergency Social Fund to raise government funding of tax collections without needing to allocate it to health and education by 20 per cent in 1992 and became a member of the Amazonian Parliament.

At the 1994 Brazilian general election in October of that year, she gained re-election to the Chamber of Deputies and left the MDB to join the Liberal Front Party in January 1996. Bezerra became head of the Committee on Work, Administration and Public Service, of which she served as its third vice-president and became an alternate member of the Committee on Social Security and Family. She was a member of the CPI on adoption and trafficking of Brazilian children, of which she was its first vice-president. Bezerra was a member of the special commission for the constitutional amendment project (PEC) on education, and an alternate on the PEC commission that modified the Public Administration chapter on the number of councilors. She was accused by the Folha de S.Paulo newspaper of voting in favour of re-election in exchange for financial compensation but the Chamber of Deputies acquitted her. Bezerra remained in the Chamber of Deputies until 2003. and served as the mayor of Cruzeiro do Sul.

In 2014, she was convicted for embezzlement of federal public money following an investigation by the Ministry of Defence technicians discovering more than 80 per cent of works and services of a contract were not carried out. Four years later, Bezerra was convicted by the Judiciary of the Civil Chamber of the Court of Justice of Acre for nonpayment of bills that Acre had to pay to the Acre Electricity Company (Eletroacre) that resulted in a loss along with interest and fines of R$16 million for the company.

== Personal life ==
She was married to the politician Aluísio Bezerra de Oliveira and the couple had one child.
