= 1891 Argentine Primera División final =

1891 Primera División final
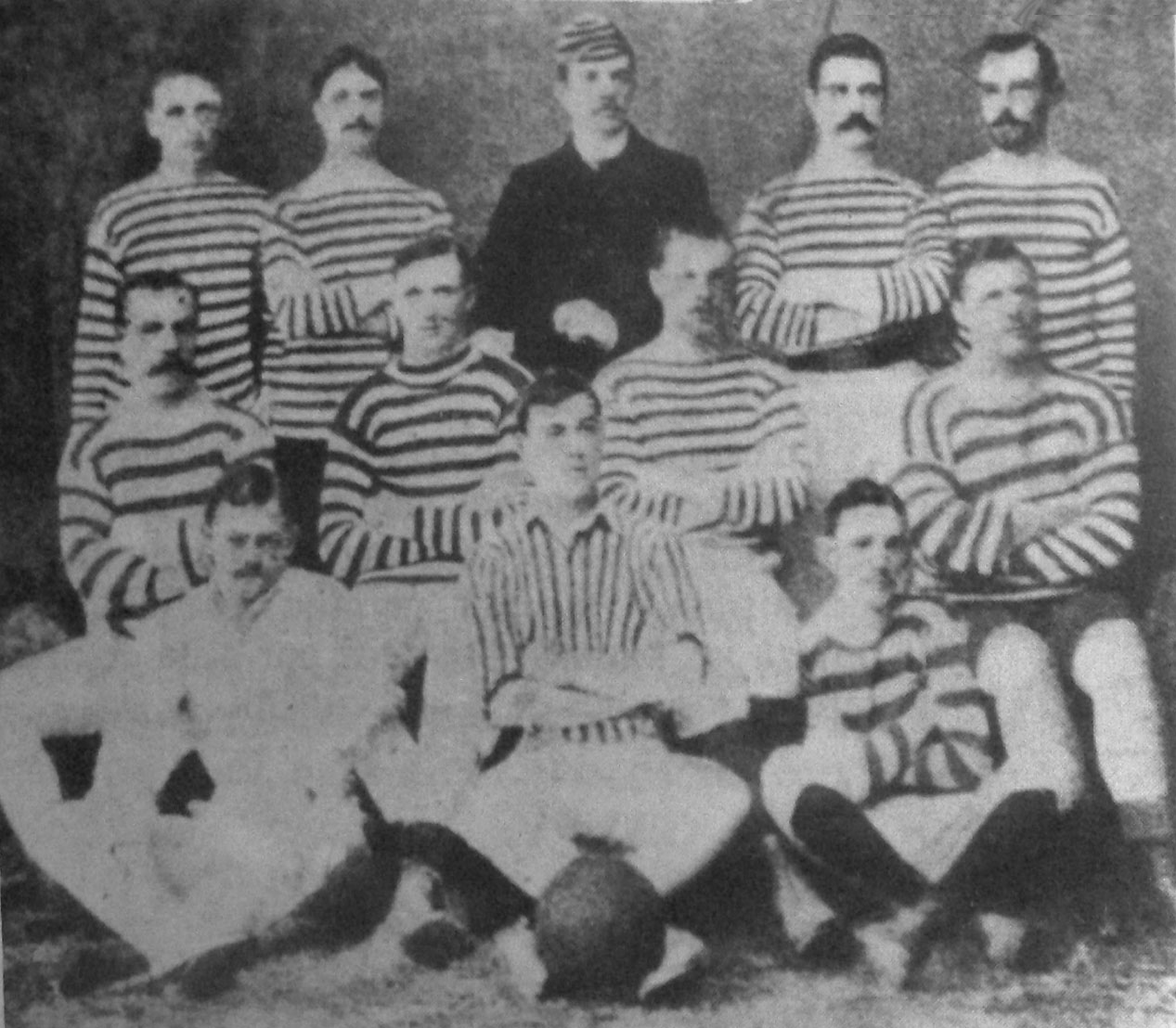
- St. Andrew's, winner of the match
- Event: 1891 Primera División
St. Andrew's	Old Caledonians
3	1
- on extra time
- Date: 13 September 1891
- Venue: Flores Old Ground, Buenos Aires
- Player of the Match: Charles Moffatt
- Referee: J. Wilson

The 1891 Argentine Primera División final was a match contested by St. Andrew's and Old Caledonians. Both teams had been declared champions of the 1891 Argentine Primera División but the match was held only to determine which of them would be awareded a medal.

The match was organized by the Argentine Association Football League whose president was F.L. Wooley. This league only lasted one season, so in 1892 no championship was held. In 1893 other Association with the same name would be established by Alexander Watson Hutton becoming current Argentine Football Association.

St. Andrew's defeated Old Caledonians 3–0 in extra time with three goals by forward Charles Douglas Moffatt.

== Qualified teams ==
Team	Previous finals app.
St. Andrew's	(none)
Old Caledonians	(none)

Bold indicates winning years

== Venue ==
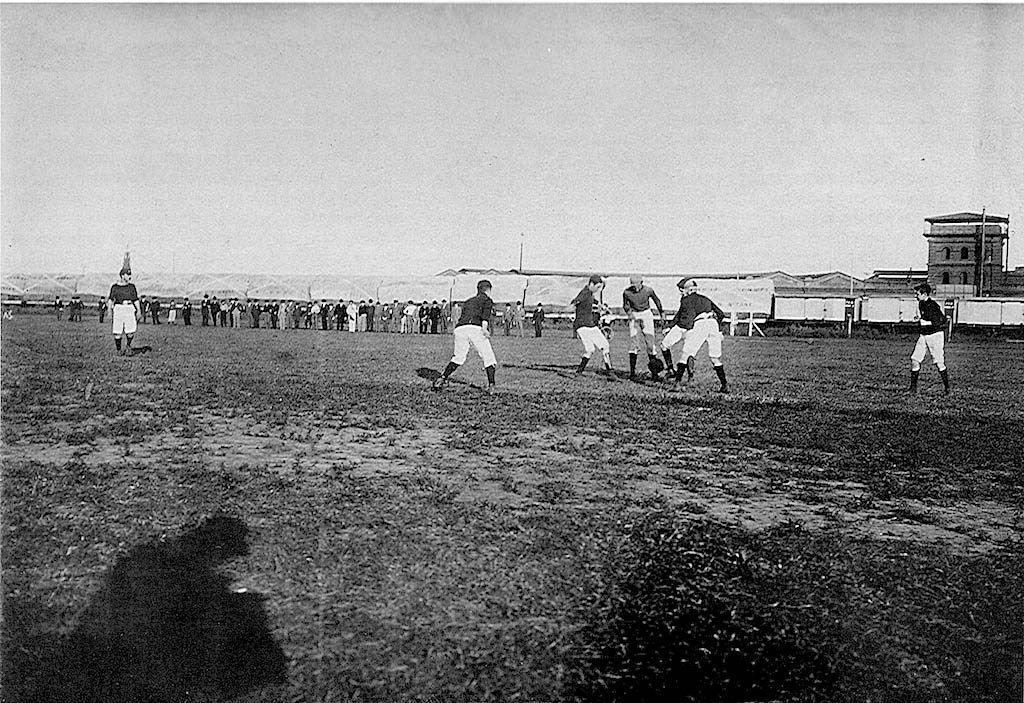
Flores Old Ground, venue

The match was held in Flores Old Ground (also known as "Old Polo Ground" or "Old Polo Field" or "Flores Polo Ground"), home venue of defunct Flores Athletic Club.

Located in the barrio of Caballito, Buenos Aires, just behind the Buenos Aires Western Railway freight sheds, it hosted several polo, rugby union, association football and cricket matches during the period Flores A.C. was active.

== Background ==
The 1891 season was the first edition of a Primera División league in Argentinam with six teams taking part of the competition.

At the end of the season, St. Andrew's (a sports club established by Scottish immigrants from the St. Andrew's Scots School, the oldest private school of Argentina.) and Old Caledonians (also established by Scottish immigrants, in this case employees of British studio Bateman, Parsons & Bateman, hired to build the main drainage in the city of Buenos Aires.) finished at the top position with 13 points each and identical records: both had won 6 matches, tied 1 and lost 1.

Although Old Caledonians had a better goal difference (+21) and despite their claims based on The Football Association rules, both teams were declared champions after a decision taken in an AAFL meeting. The Association also obliged two teams to play a match to decide which team would be awarded medals.

Due to serious financial problems, the AAFL decided to charge for admission to the match in order to balance its finances.

== Match ==
As the Association crowned both, St. Andrew's and Old Caledonians as champion, this match was held only to determine which team got to keep the medals.

1891 Primera División medal match
13 September 1891

St. Andrew's	3–1 (a.e.t.)	Old Caledonians
Moffatt	Report	E. Wilson

Flores Old Ground
Referee: J. Wilson

**St. Andrew's**
**Old Caledonians**

GK	F. V. Carter
DF	L. C. Penman
DF	William A. Waters (c)
MF	F. Francis
MF	H. Barnes
MF	Alexander Buchanan
FW	John Caldwell
FW	(England) Charles Moffatt
FW	(Scotland) Alexander Lamont
FW	E. Morgan
FW	J. Buchanan

GK	W. Gibson
DF	M. Scott
DF	J. Riggs (c)
MF	W. Angus
MF	R. Phillips
MF	R. Smith
FW	H. White
FW	J. Clark
FW	(Scotland) Jack Sutherland
FW	E. L. Wilson
FW	R. Corsner

=== Aftermath ===
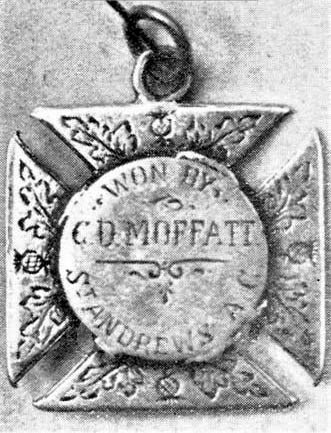
Medal awarded St. Andrew's players

During an interview in 1934, striker Charles Douglas Moffatt stated Old Caledonians was the best team of all that participated in the tournament, also saying that St. Andrew's had won the championship "by chance". Moffatt also praised Old Caledonians' Scottish forward Jack Sutherland, highlighting his dribbling and skills with the ball.

I had played every game except the last one of the championship, due to a sprained right ankle. So I returned to the playoffs, but was unable to shoot from distance. I managed to score the goal by taking advantage of a scramble in front of the Caledonians goal. The ball came towards me, and all I had to do was flick it over the line (with the inside of my foot), and we won our first tournament. Only a few English attended the match... then, people was not even aware about the existence of the game

— Charles Moffatt about the match and the legacy of the 1891 championship, in an interview with Félix Frascara published on El Gráfico, 1934

The Argentine Football Association had not included this title in its previous annual reports so the body was established in 1893 and did not organise the championship. Nevertheless, on AFA's official website only St. Andrew's is mentioned as 1891 champion.
