= 1893 Argentine Primera División =

2nd season of top-tier football league in Argentina

Primera División
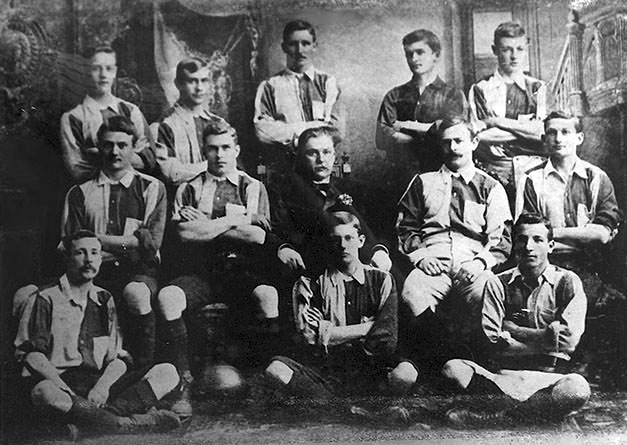
- Lomas A.C., champion
- Season: 1893
- Dates: 23 April – 20 August
- Champions: Lomas (1st title)
- Relegated: (none)
- Matches: 21
- Goals: 67 (3.19 per match)
- Top goalscorer: (Argentina) William Leslie (Lomas)
- Biggest home win: Lomas 11–0 English H.S.
- Biggest away win: English H.S. 0–5 Lomas

The 1893 Primera División was the 2nd season in top-flight football in Argentina and the first organized by current Argentine Football Association, established that same year by Alexander Watson Hutton, considered "the father" of Argentine football.

Only Buenos Aires and Rosario Railway survived from the 1891 championship.

The championship took the format of a league of 5 teams, with each team playing each of the others three times. Nevertheless, the third round was then eliminated by the Association after BA&RR and BAEHS retired from the competition. Lomas Athletic Club won its first league title.

== Final standings ==
Pos	Team	Pld	W	D	L	GF	GA	GD	Pts	Qualification or relegation
1	Lomas (C)	8	7	1	0	26	2	+24	15	Champion
2	Flores	8	5	0	3	19	9	+10	10	
3	Quilmes Rovers	8	3	3	2	12	11	+1	9	
4	English High School	8	1	2	5	6	25	−19	4	(Retired after eight matches played)
5	Buenos Aires and Rosario Railway	8	0	2	6	3	19	−16	2	(Retired after eight matches played)

Source: RSSSF
(C) Champions

== Results ==
Home \ Away	BAR	ENG	FLO	LOM	QUI
Buenos Aires and Rosario Railway		0–0	1–2	0–2	2–2
English High School	2–0		2–5	0–5	2–2
Flores	6–1	2–0		0–1	2–4
Lomas	3–0	11–0	1–0		2–2
Quilmes Rovers	2–0	W.O.	0–2	0–1	

Updated to match(es) played on unknown. Source:
Legend: Blue = home team win; Yellow = draw; Red = away team win.
