= 1891 in Argentine football =

Football in Argentina
- Season: 1891

Men's football
- Primera División: St. Andrew's; Old Caledonians

1891 in Argentine football saw the first ever Argentine championship which was run by the Association Argentine Football (AAF) making Argentina's the oldest football league outside mainland Britain. This tournament was organized by the Argentine Association Football League which president was F.L. Wooley. This league only lasted one season, so in 1892 no championship was held. In 1893 other Association with the same name would be established by Alexander Watson Hutton becoming current Argentine Football Association.

At the end of the season, St. Andrew's and Old Caledonians finished at the top position with 13 points each. They were declared joint champions, but played a playoff match to decide which team got to keep the medals, being St. Andrew's the winner. Nevertheless, the Argentine Football Association website only mentions St. Andrew's as the first champion ever, although the body (established in 1893) did not organised the tournament.

== Primera división ==
The championship took the format of a league of 5 teams, with each team playing the other twice. Many of the results of individual games have been lost, hence the lack of goals for and against in the table below. Hurlingham registered in the tournament but did not take part of the same.

=== Final standings ===
Pos	Team	Pts	G	W	D	L
1	Old Caledonians	13	8	6	1	1
2	St. Andrew's	13	8	6	1	1
3	Buenos Aires and Rosario Railway	7	8	3	1	4
4	Belgrano F.C. (Note: Predecessor of current Belgrano Athletic Club.)	5	8	2	1	5
5	Buenos Aires Football Club (Note: This was not the club founded by the Hogg brothers but another football club that only participated in this championship. The team's jersey was red and white in vertical stripes while its venue was located in Flores, Buenos Aires.)	2	8	1	0	7

=== Playoff game ===
This match was played to decide which team got to keep the medals.

13 September 1891

St. Andrew's	3-1	Old Caledonians
Moffatt (3)		Wilson

Old Ground Flores
