= English Argentines =

Argentines of English ancestry

Anglo-Argentines
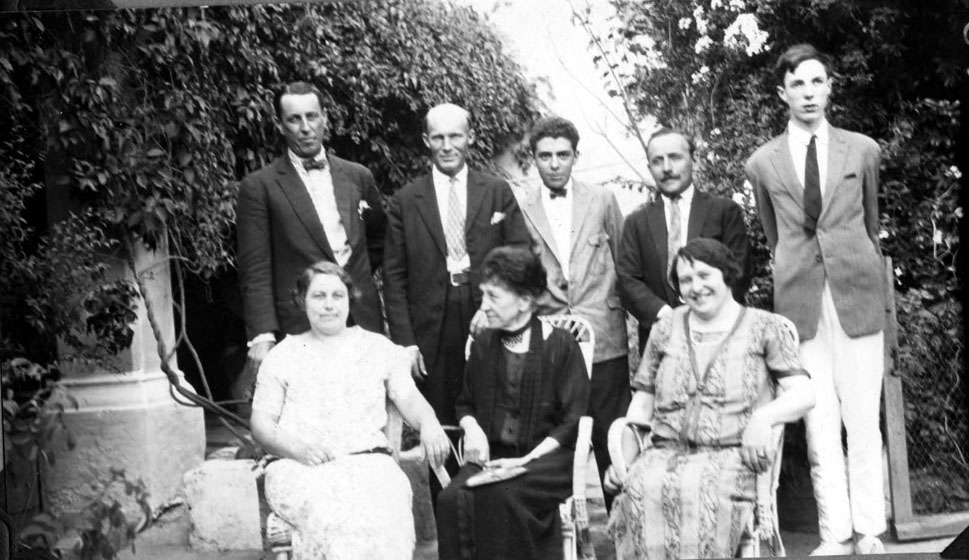
- Argentines of English descent at Harold Blaine's estancia in 1926

Total population
- c. '100,000

Regions with significant populations
- Mainly Buenos Aires

Languages
- Majority: Spanish; Minority: English

Religion
- Catholicism, Protestantism (Episcopalianism, Methodism, Presbyterianism)

Related ethnic groups
- Scottish Argentines · Welsh Argentines · Irish Argentines · Other Argentines

English Argentines (also known as Anglo-Argentines) are citizens of Argentina or the children of Argentine citizens brought up in Argentina, who can claim ancestry originating in England. The English settlement in Argentina (the arrival of English emigrants) took place in the period after Argentina's independence from Spain through the 19th century. Unlike many other waves of immigration to Argentina, English immigrants were not usually leaving England because of poverty or persecution, but went to Argentina as industrialists and major landowners.

The United Kingdom had a strong economic influence in Argentina during the Victorian period. However the position of English Argentines was complicated when their economic influence was finally eroded by Juan Perón's nationalisation of many British-owned companies in the 1940s and then by the Falklands War in 1982. Notable Argentines such as presidents of Argentina Raúl Alfonsín and Carlos Pellegrini, adventurer Lucas Bridges, Huracan football club former player and president Carlos Babington and writer Jorge Luis Borges are partially of English descent.

== English immigration ==
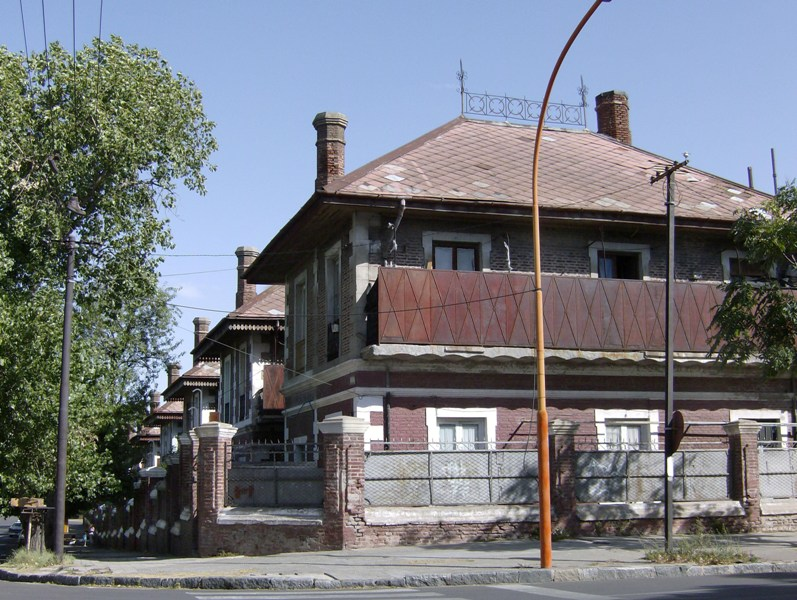
"New Liverpool," an English neighborhood in Bahía Blanca, Buenos Aires.

English migration to Argentina began in small numbers during the early 19th century, particularly after the British invasions of the Río de la Plata (1806–1807), when merchants, engineers and commercial agents began to establish a more sustained presence in Buenos Aires and surrounding regions.

Following Argentine independence, English migrants increasingly participated in commercial and infrastructural development during the mid to late 19th century. Many were involved in banking, shipping, and export-oriented agriculture, particularly the expansion of cattle ranching and wheat production in the Pampas, which became central to Argentina’s export economy.

A significant proportion of English settlers were associated with railway construction and engineering projects, which were largely financed by British capital. These networks facilitated agricultural expansion and linked rural production zones to the port of Buenos Aires.

In addition to economic migrants, smaller numbers arrived as missionaries, technicians, and entrepreneurs. Some younger sons of British families sought opportunities abroad due to inheritance practices, while others entered rural landholding and cattle ranching, particularly in the Pampas region.

English cultural influence also extended into sport and education. Association football, cricket, rugby and tennis were introduced through British schools, railway communities and expatriate clubs in the late 19th century, later becoming embedded in Argentine sporting culture.

By the early 20th century, English immigrants and their descendants formed a relatively small but economically influential community, concentrated in Buenos Aires and key railway-linked towns. Over time, however, assimilation increased and distinct English identity became less visible outside institutional settings such as schools, churches and clubs.

== Background ==
In 1825, the United Kingdom recognised the independence of the United Provinces of South America. English arrivals and investment played a large part in the development of Argentine railway and tramway lines, and also Argentine agriculture, livestock breeding, processing, refrigeration and export. At one point in the 19th century, ten per cent of British foreign investment was in Argentina, despite not being a colony. In 1939, 39% of investment in Argentina was British.

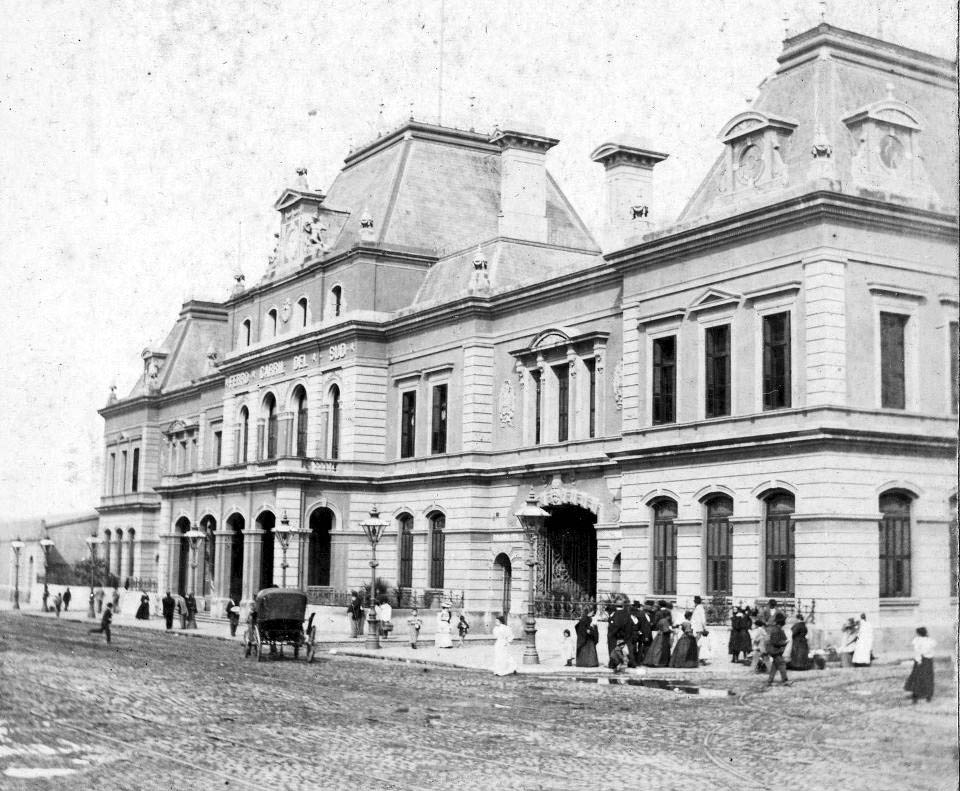
Constitución railway station in Buenos Aires. Opened in 1907 by British developers, it is the busiest station in Argentina.

English culture, or a version of it as perceived from outside, had a noted effect on the culture of Argentina, mainly in the middle classes. In 1888 local Anglo-Argentines established the Hurlingham Club, based on its namesake in London. The city of Hurlingham, Buenos Aires and Hurlingham Partido in Buenos Aires Province later grew up around the club and took their names from it. The Córdoba Athletic Club, one of the oldest sports clubs in Argentina, was founded in 1882 by English men who lived in Córdoba working for the railways.

In 1912 the well-known London department store Harrods opened a store in Buenos Aires; the only Harrods ever opened outside London. Harrods Buenos Aires became independent of Harrods in the 1940s, but still traded under the Harrods name.

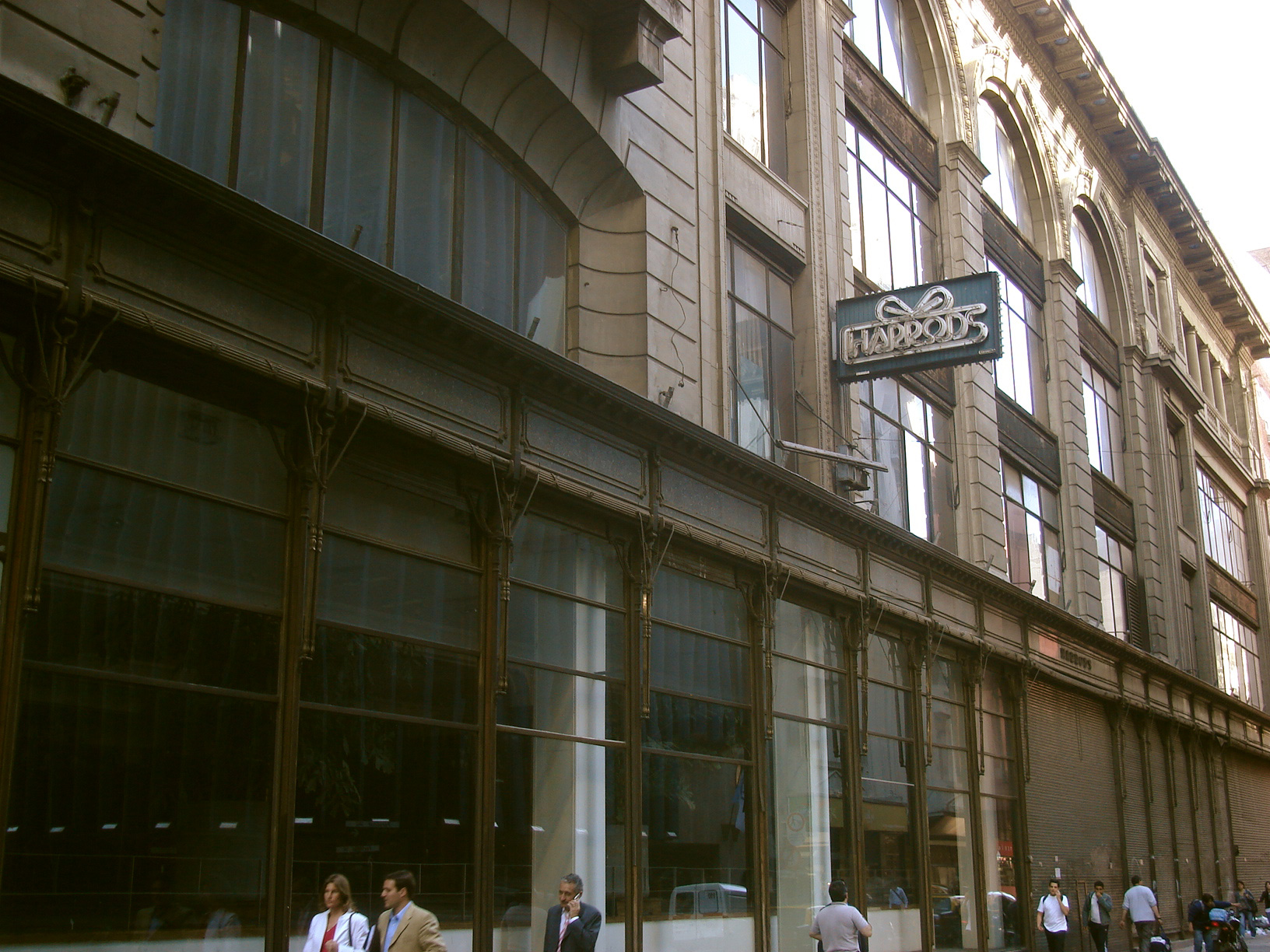
Harrods on Florida Street. Opened in 1912 as their only overseas branch, it closed in 1998 and is now an exhibition hall.

Afternoon tea became standard amongst large segments of the population and generated the popular merienda, an afternoon snack also known simply as la leche (milk) because it was served with tea or chocolate milk along with sweets. The Richmond café on Florida Street is a notable tea venue near the Harrods department store, now an exhibition hall.

Gardened chalets built by railway executives near railway stations in cities like La Plata and suburbs including Banfield, Temperley, Munro, Ranelagh and Hurlingham gave a pointed English atmosphere to local areas in Buenos Aires, especially in winter when shrouded in grey mists and fallen oak leaves over cobblestones. Belgrano R, within the Belgrano district, is another train station known for the British neighbourhood around it originated by the railway. An Anglican church from 1896 and the Buenos Aires English High School founded by Alexander Watson Hutton in 1884 are both in this area. Also important are the railway terminals Retiro in Retiro neighbourhood and Constitución. There are numerous countryside stations in the Pampas.

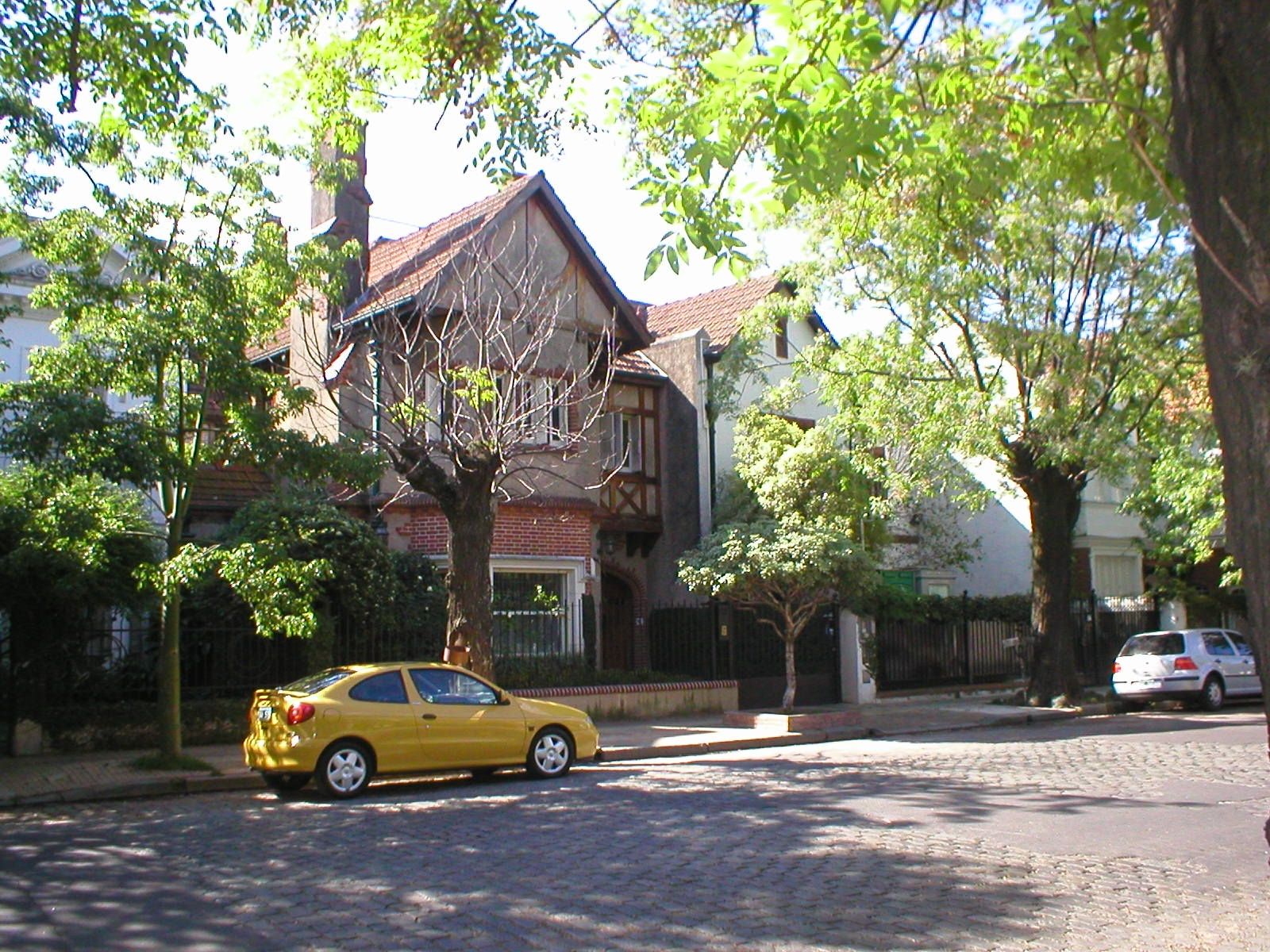
English-style houses on a residential street in Belgrano R.

Around 300,000 Anglo-Argentines are the descendants of English immigrants to Argentina. They are one of the most successful immigrant groups of Argentina, gaining prominence in commerce, industry, and the professions. Many speak fluent English at home. An English-language newspaper, the Buenos Aires Herald, was published daily in Buenos Aires from 1876 to 2017.

Anglo-Argentines have traditionally differed from their fellow Argentines by largely retaining strong ties with their mother country, including education and commerce. There are many schools in Argentina that are bilingual, offering a British curriculum in English and the standard Argentine curriculum in Spanish, including Northlands School, St. Mark's College, Balmoral College, St. Alban's College, St. George's College, Belgrano Day School and Washington School. Buenos Aires had a number of branches of the Asociación Argentina de Cultura Inglesa (English Cultural Association), and throughout the 20th century English language learning and teaching in state schools and private institutions was invariably geared towards the Received Pronunciation. Many private boys' schools have a uniform of blue blazers and grey flannel trousers.

The Anglo-Argentine Society, based in London, was founded in 1948 and has about 900 members. It is a society for Argentine people living in the United Kingdom, particularly those of Anglo-Argentine heritage. One of its main aims is to promote understanding and friendship between the two countries. Also in London is the Canning Club, formerly the Argentine Club until Juan Perón nationalised Argentine-based British businesses, the main source of revenue of the club in the 1940s. The club is for those with a particular link to, or special interest in, Argentina and other Latin American countries.

The Coghlan neighbourhood in Buenos Aires, known for its large English-style residences, was originally inhabited by English and Irish immigrants. Caballito contains an area called the "English District".

In 1794, the British Empire opened a consulate in San Nicolás, leading to the development of a large British community in the area, which became known as the "English borough". They founded the English Merchants' Society in 1810 and in 1822 the British Consulate became home to the first modern bank in Buenos Aires.

== World War II ==
During World War II, 4,000 Argentines served with all three British armed services, even though Argentina was officially a neutral country during the war. Over 600 Argentine volunteers served with both the Royal Air Force and the Royal Canadian Air Force, mostly in the 164 Argentine-British RAF squadron, whose shield bore the sun from the flag of Argentina and the motto, "Determined We Fly (Firmes Volamos)". Many members of the Anglo-Argentine community also volunteered in non-combat roles, or worked to raise money and supplies for British troops. In April 2005, a special remembrance service was held at the RAF church of St Clement Danes in London.

Nearly 500 Argentines served in the Royal Navy around the world, from the North Atlantic to the South Pacific. Many were part of the special forces, such as John Godwin.

== Falklands War ==
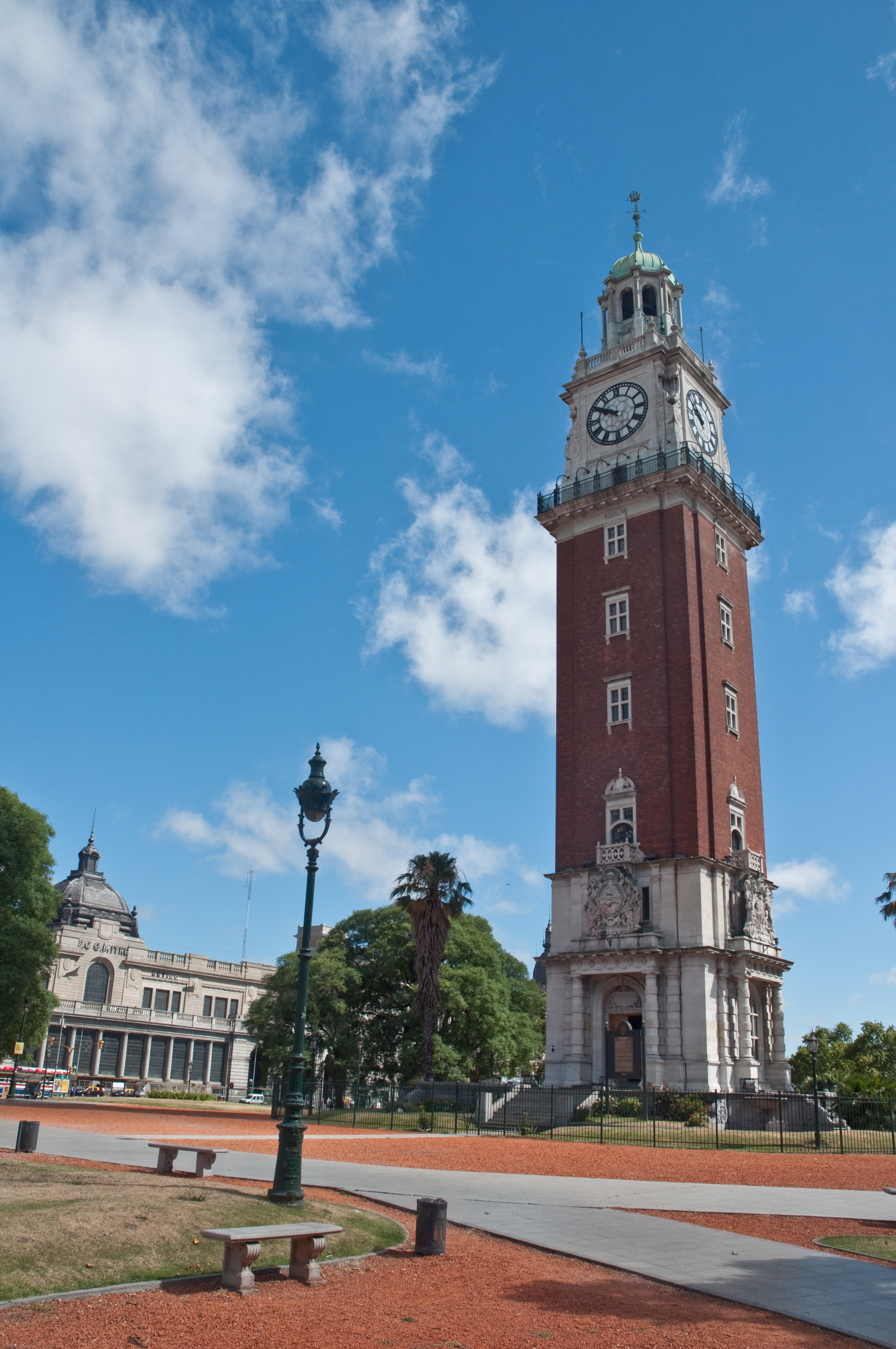
The Torre de los Ingleses (now Torre Monumental) in Buenos Aires, reflecting historic British influence in Argentina.

During the Argentine occupation of the Falkland Islands (Islas Malvinas) in April 1982, at the outset of the Falklands War, the British government considered potential risks to British expatriates and Anglo-Argentine communities in Argentina. Prime Minister Margaret Thatcher was briefed on possible diplomatic and security repercussions, although assessments indicated that widespread reprisals against civilians of British descent were unlikely.

In practice, no systematic persecution of Anglo-Argentines occurred. Contemporary accounts suggest that some individuals with visible British affiliations experienced short-term caution or social pressure during the conflict, although this was not state-directed and varied significantly by region and social context.

The war did not materially alter the legal status of Anglo-Argentine communities, but it did contribute to a broader symbolic shift. Historians note that it reinforced an already ongoing decline in overt public identification with British heritage in some sectors, particularly within urban elites, while established institutions such as bilingual schools, clubs and churches continued to operate.

Diplomatic relations between the United Kingdom and Argentina were severed during the war and were restored in 1990.

The sovereignty dispute over the Falkland Islands (Islas Malvinas) remains unresolved, with Argentina maintaining its claim and the United Kingdom continuing to exercise administration. International positions, including that of the United States, have generally supported dialogue between the parties without endorsing sovereignty transfer.

== English place names ==
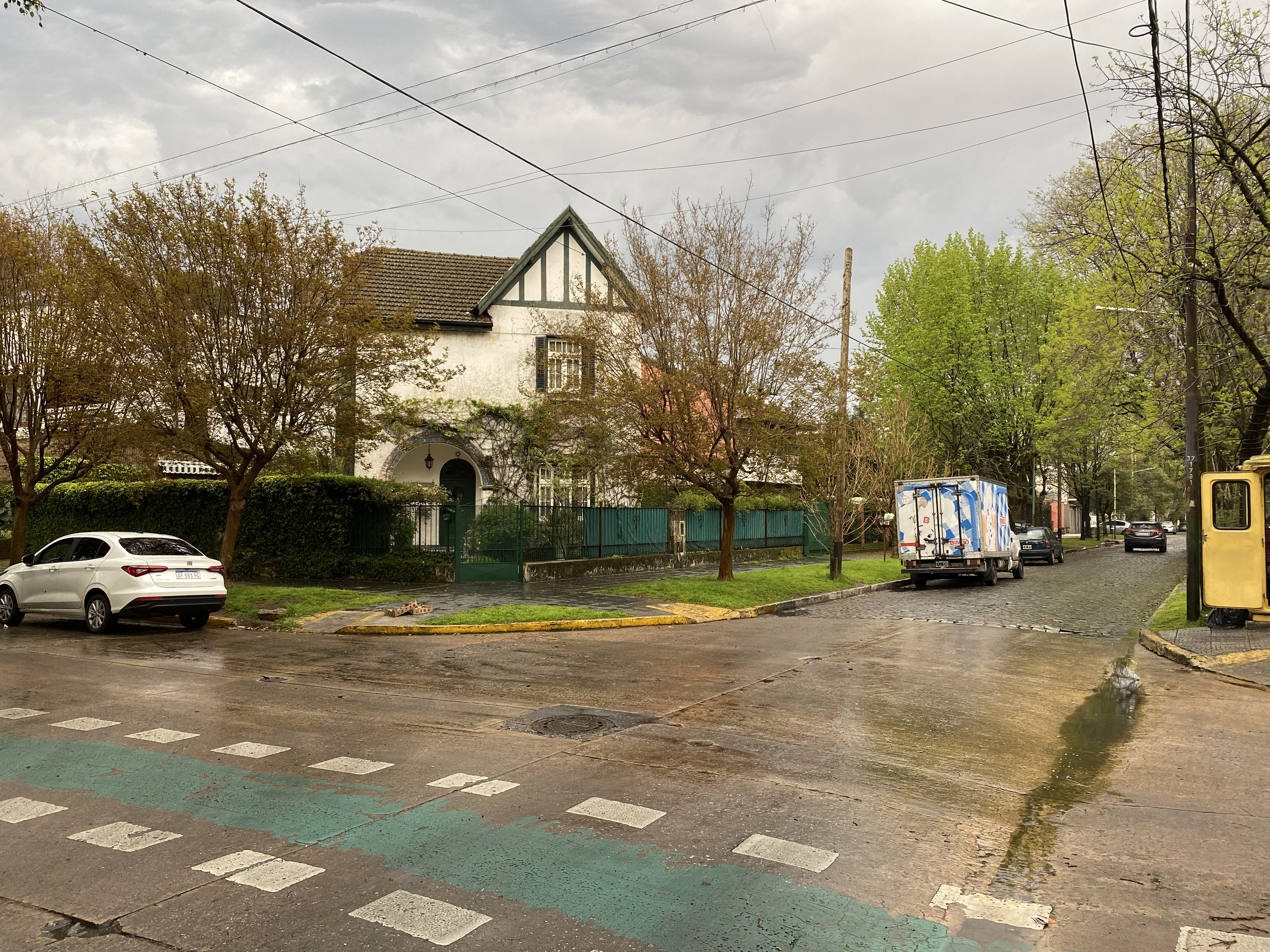
The Streets of Banfield, Buenos Aires.

A number of localities in Argentina reflect English influence, either through direct naming by British railway companies and settlers, or by commemoration of individuals of British origin or association.

Hudson, in Buenos Aires Province, is named after the naturalist Guillermo Enrique Hudson (1841–1922), an Argentine-born writer and ornithologist of English descent, whose work was later recognised in both Argentina and the United Kingdom.

Banfield, also in Buenos Aires Province, is named after Edward Banfield (1820–1872), the first general manager of the Buenos Aires Great Southern Railway, reflecting the influence of British railway development in the region.

Wilde, another locality in Greater Buenos Aires, was named in 1888 by Eduardo Wilde in honour of his uncle, Dr José Antonio Wilde, an Anglo-Argentine physician and historian of English descent.

These examples reflect a broader pattern in which British-associated figures, particularly those linked to railway expansion, medicine and intellectual life, were commemorated in Argentine toponymy during the late 19th century.

== Sport ==
=== Football ===
Alumni (photographed in 1902) was a successful football club formed by students of the Buenos Aires English High School that highly contributed to the popularity and consolidation of football in Argentina.

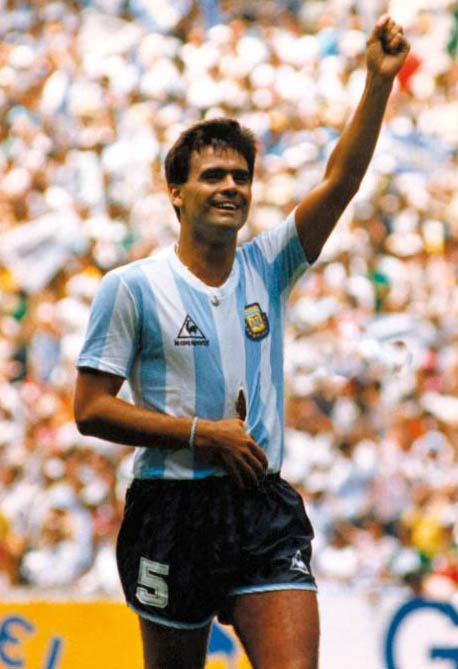
José Luis Brown, Argentine footballer of English descent who won the 1986 FIFA World Cup.

English railway workers from Northern England founded the Buenos Aires Football Club on 9 May 1867 in Temple Street (now Viamonte) at a meeting organised by brothers Thomas and James Hogg, who were originally from Yorkshire. The first football match to be played in Argentina was played at the Buenos Aires Cricket Club in Palermo, Buenos Aires, on 20 June 1867. The match was played between two teams of British merchants, the White Caps and the Red Caps.

British football clubs' tours of South America contributed to the spread and development of football in the region during the first years of the 20th century. The first club to tour the region was Southampton F.C. in 1904, followed by several teams (mainly from England, although some from Scotland also visited South America) until 1929, with Chelsea F.C. being the last team to tour.

Further examples of clubs established by British immigrants to South America are Belgrano A.C., Rosario A.C., Alumni, Quilmes and Newell's Old Boys.

=== Rugby Union ===
The first rugby match under the laws of rugby union was played on 14 May 1874 between the Buenos Aires Football Club. Until 1903, the only teams taking part in tournaments had been founded by English natives or their descendants. It was only in 1904 when the first team formed by "criollos" made its appearance, named "Centro de Estudiantes de la Facultad de Ingeniería". Over time, rugby became successfully transplanted to the local population.

Argentina's first contact with a team outside the continent was in 1910, when the British and Irish Lions toured Argentina. Two additional tours took place in 1927 and 1936.

Argentine Rugby Clubs founded by the British community include Belgrano A.C., Club Atlético San Isidro, Rosario A.C., Alumni, Buenos Aires Cricket & Rugby Club and Lomas Athletic Club.

=== Cricket ===
The first time cricket was practised in the country was during the British invasions of the Río de la Plata in 1806 and 1807. Years later, a cricket game was played at Recoleta, Buenos Aires, near the Nuestra Señora del Pilar church in 1831. During that game, a flag with the legend "Buenos Aires Cricket Club" was displayed. This later became the Buenos Aires Cricket & Rugby Club in 1864.

In the rest of Argentina, more cricket institutions were founded, Córdoba, Rosario, Lomas de Zamora, Quilmes and Flores being some of the most important centres for the practise of the sport. All of those clubs were exclusively for members of the British community, who contributed to keep the institutions active.

When World War II began, most of the British players joined the British Army, leaving Argentina. This caused the level of the game to decrease.

Clubs that currently play cricket include Hurlingham Club (Argentina), Belgrano A.C., Old Georgian Club, Club San Albano and Lomas Athletic Club.

=== Other sports ===
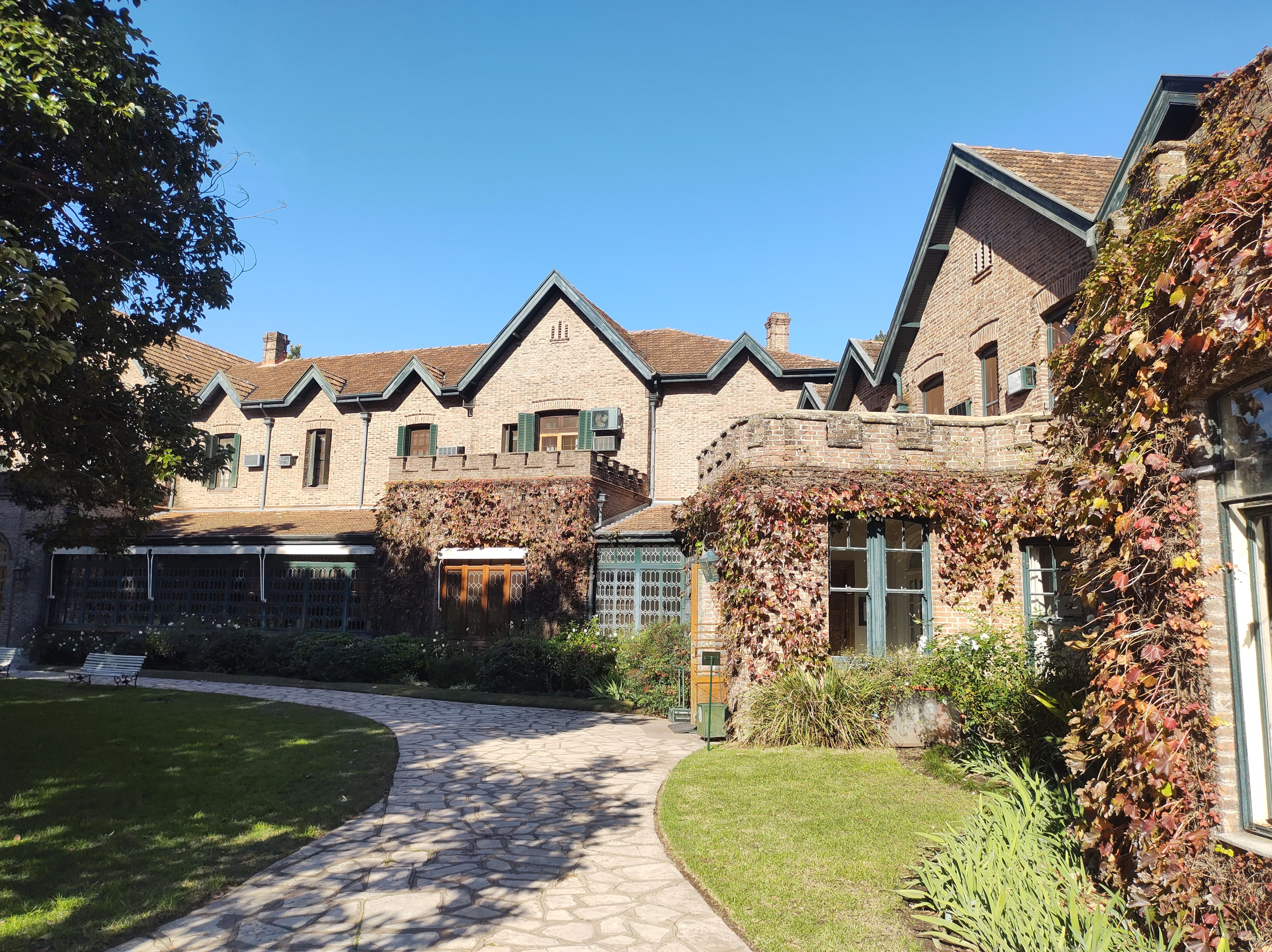
Entrance to the Hurlingham Club in Hurlingham, Buenos Aires.

The British community played a foundational role in the introduction, organisation and early institutional development of several modern sports in Argentina during the late 19th and early 20th centuries. These sports were transmitted primarily through British-owned railway companies, expatriate social clubs, and elite bilingual schools in Buenos Aires and other major urban centres.

Field hockey, tennis, rugby union and cricket were among the earliest structured sports introduced through British educational institutions and clubs, where they were initially played within expatriate and upper-class circles before gradually diffusing into broader Argentine society.

Polo became particularly prominent due to the integration of British settlers into Argentina’s cattle ranching economy, where existing equestrian skills aligned with local estanciero culture. By the early 20th century, Argentina had developed one of the strongest polo traditions outside the United Kingdom.

Golf, squash and lawn bowls were primarily associated with private clubs established in Buenos Aires and railway towns, reflecting the leisure culture of British expatriates and engineers involved in infrastructure development.

Rowing and sailing were also introduced through British sporting clubs along the Río de la Plata, where water-based recreation mirrored patterns seen in British port cities. These activities contributed to the early formation of Argentine rowing and yacht clubs, many of which remain active today.

Over time, these sports moved beyond expatriate communities and became integrated into national sporting structures, particularly through school systems and club competitions, leaving a lasting institutional legacy in Argentine sport culture.

== Religion ==
=== Anglican church in Argentina ===
Anglican churches were established in Argentina, where the religion is otherwise overwhelmingly Catholic, in the early 19th century to give a chaplaincy service to expatriate workers living in Argentina. In 1824 permission was given to hold Anglican church services, and in 1831 St. John's Church was built in San Nicolás, Buenos Aires on land donated in 1830 by Governor Juan Manuel de Rosas for the benefit of the new St. John the Baptist Anglican Church. It is the oldest in existence in Buenos Aires.

English naval captain and Christian missionary, Allen Gardiner founded the Patagonia Mission (later renamed the South American Missionary Society) in 1844 to recruit, send, and support Protestant Christian missionaries. His first mission, which included a surgeon and three fishermen was sent to the Yaghans on the island of Isla Grande de Tierra del Fuego. They arrived at Picton island in Tierra del Fuego in December 1850, but their food began to run out; the supplies they had expected did not arrive, and by September 1851 they had died from sickness and hunger. The Patagonia Mission continued and in 1854 changed its name to the South American Missionary Society.

In January 1869 the Society established a mission at Ushuaia in Tierra del Fuego under its superintendent, Waite Hockin Stirling. On 21 December 1869 Stirling was ordained at Westminster Abbey as the first Bishop of the Falkland Islands and at the time had episcopal authority over the whole of South America, until authority was transferred to the Bishop of Argentina. In 1914 the first mission, Misión Chaqueña, was founded in the north of Argentina.

The Anglican Diocese of Argentina is part of the Anglican Province of the Southern Cone of America and is headed by the current bishop of Argentina.

== Notable people ==
- Carlos Babington – former footballer. Known as "El Inglés" (The Englishman).
- Hilda Bernard – actress.
- Jorge Luis Borges – author and poet; his grandmother was of English origin.
- Eduardo Bradley – aviator.
- Lucas Bridges – author and explorer.
- Chris de Burgh - singer.
- Rodolfo Enrique Fogwill – author and sociologist.
- Donald Forrester – cricketer.
- John Godwin – Royal Navy officer.
- Andrew Graham-Yooll – editor.
- Trevor Grove – journalist and newspaper editor.
- Soto Grimshaw – naturalist and explorer.
- Diego Hartfield – tennis player.
- Juan Enrique Hayes – football player.
- Leonardo Henrichsen – photojournalist.
- Mariano Hood – tennis player.
- Juan Carlos Howard – tango pianist and composer.
- William Henry Hudson – author and naturalist.
- Cynthia Hotton – politician.
- Martita Hunt – actress.
- Olivia Hussey – actress.
- Lewis Lacey – polo player.
- Roberto M. Levingston – Argentina President June 18, 1970 – March 21, 1971
- Carlos Micháns - composer
- Francisco Moreno – explorer and geographer. His mother, Juana Thwaites, was of English descent.
- Isaac Newell – founder or Newell's Old Boys football club.
- Alec Oxenford – Politician, Argentine Ambassador to the United States.
- Olga Casares Pearson – actress.
- Carlos Pellegrini – President of Argentina from 6 August 1890 to 12 October 1892. His mother, María Bevans Bright, was of English origin.
- Julio Porter – screenwriter and film director.
- Peter Prescott (barrister) – King's Counsel.
- Jorge Pullin – physicist.
- Elena Roger – actress.
- Collier Twentyman Smithers – portrait, figure and rustic painter.
- René Strickler – actor.
- Anya Taylor-Joy – actress.
- Martín Jacobo Thompson – navy officer and patriot, founder of the Argentine Naval Prefecture.
- Maria Elena Walsh – children's literature writer and singer.
- Eduardo Wilde – physician, politician and writer.
- Amancio Williams – architect.

== Gallery ==
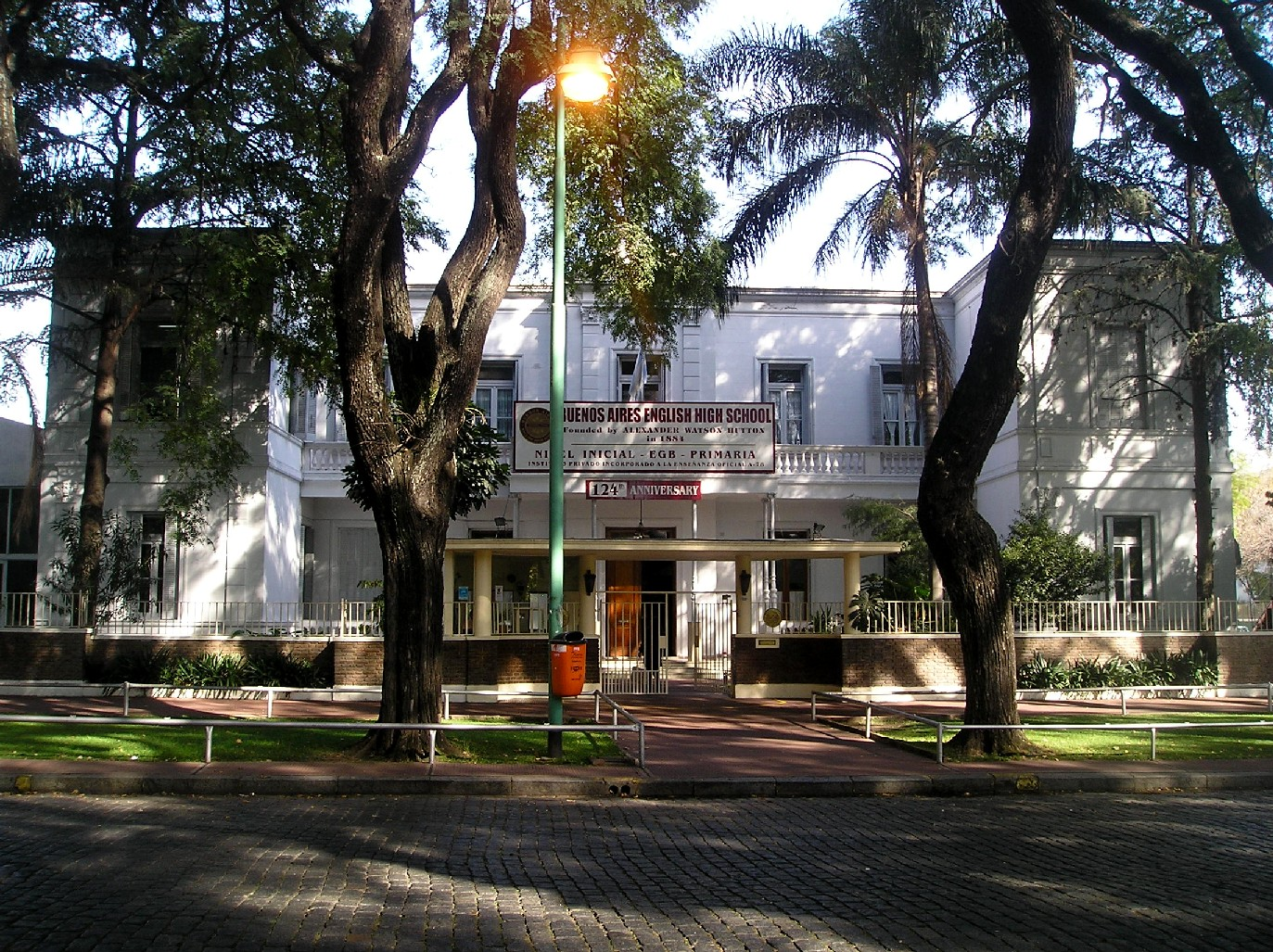
Buenos Aires English High School.

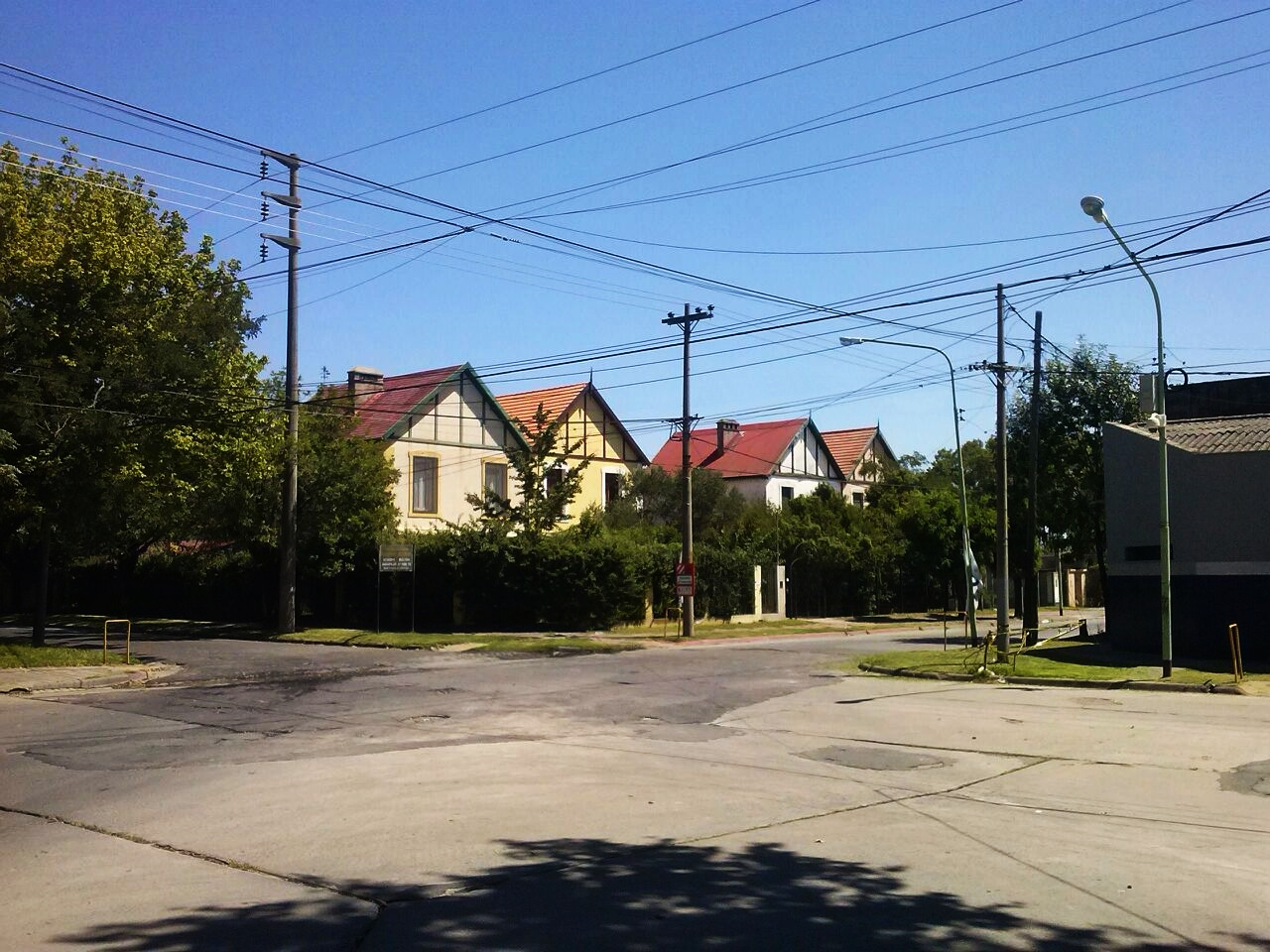
Entrance to the English Neighbourhood (Barrio Inglés) of Campana.

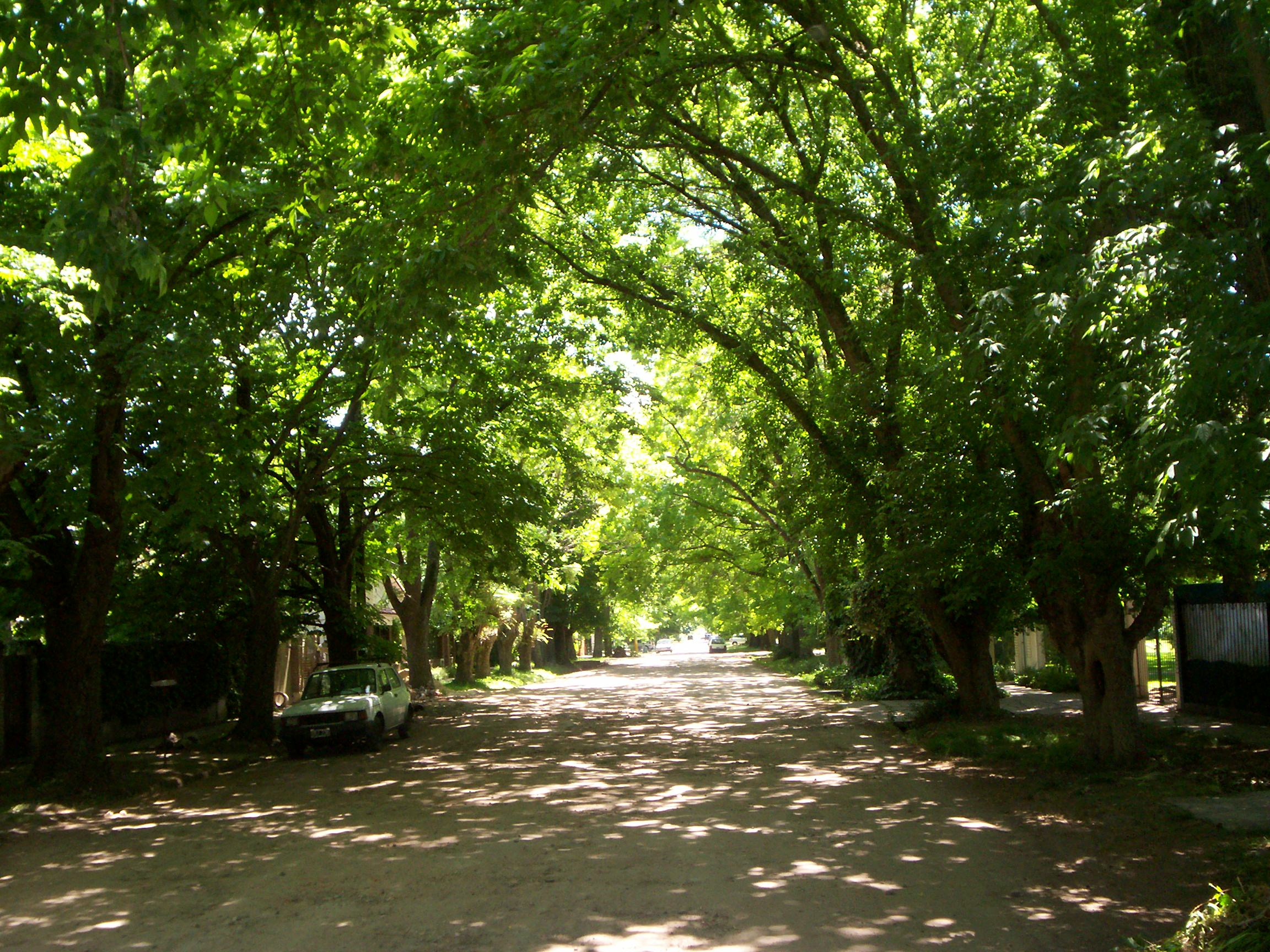
Tree-lined street in City Bell.

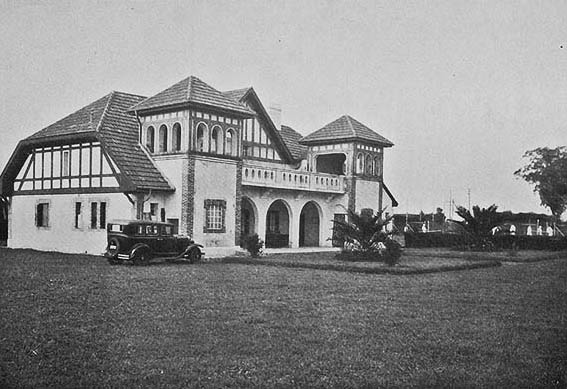
The Quilmes Atlético Club headquarters in 1930.

== See also ==
- Football in Argentina
- Buenos Aires English High School
- Alumni Athletic Club
- British football clubs tours to South America
- Argentina–United Kingdom relations
