= 1894 in Argentine football =

Football in Argentina
- Season: 1894

Men's football
- Primera División: Lomas

1894 in Argentine football saw Lomas A.C. become the first team to retain the Primera División championship. The runner-up was Rosario A.C., which made its debut at the tournament along with Retiro Athletic. Most of the results of the games and the goals scored information have been lost.

The English High School A.C. team dissolved so the team did not take part of the tournament although its players joined Lanús A.C. and Lobos A.C., which registered to the Association. St. Andrew's, the first Argentine champion, returned to the League. Buenos Aires and Rosario Railway left the tournament soon after it had started.

== Primera división ==
=== Final standings ===
Pos	Team	Pts	G	W	D	L
1	Lomas	18	10	8	2	0
2	Rosario A.C.	14	10	6	2	2
3	Flores	12	10	6	0	4
4	Lobos	9	10	3	3	4
5	St. Andrew's	6	10	3	0	7
6	Retiro A.C.	1	10	0	1	9
