= Club San Andrés =

Argentine sports club

(Argentina) San Andrés
- Full name: Club San Andrés
- Union: URBA
- Founded: 9 May 1911; 115 years ago
- Location: Benavídez, Tigre Partido
- Ground(s): Av. Italia, Benavídez
- President: Paul Hogg
- Coach(es): Patricio Anderson; German De Elizalde, Agustin Rabinovich
- League: URBA Primera A
- 2026: 9th.
Team kit

Official website
- clubsanandres.com

Club San Andrés (official name: Asociación Ex-Alumnos San Andrés) is an Argentine sports club sited in the Benavídez district of Tigre Partido, Greater Buenos Aires. Sports practised at San Andrés include rugby union, field hockey and association football.

The rugby squad currently plays in Primera A, the second division of the Unión de Rugby de Buenos Aires league system.

== History ==
=== Background ===
In 1838, Saint Andrew's Scots School (in Spanish: "Escuela Escocesa San Andrés") was established by a group of Scottish settlers determined to educate their children in their language, faith and culture. Founded as a boys school, Saint Andrews would become co-educational soon after.

The first sports club established by the School was the St. Andrew's Athletic Club, which won the first Primera División championship organized in Argentina in 1891 although the club was dissolved c. 1894.

=== The club ===
The current club was founded under the name "St. Andrew's Former Pupil's Club" on May 9, 1911, as a social and sporting club for school alumni. The meeting was presided by William P. Hardie, a former teacher and rector of the school. The first committee designed Sidney Sanders as the first president of the recently formed institution.

The first activities practised at the club were rugby union, field hockey, swimming, football and sailing. Rugby was one of the original sports played at the club since its foundation. The team had not played in the first division until 2009, when San Andrés won the promotion to the top level after defeating Universitario de La Plata 18–5.

In 1985, the club was renamed to "Asociación Ex-Alumnos San Andrés". After four seasons in URBA's top division, San Andrés was relegated again in 2013. In 2016 season the URBA announced a new division system in which there were more division with less teams in each one. That year, San Andrés had its worst year in many time, being relegated to two lower divisions. For the year 2017 there was a huge change in the club in where everyone pushed forward for it to go better. The results were quickly evidenced as in 2017 when San Andres played in Second Division of URBA (actually the 5th division) they won the tournament with 24 matches won and only 2 defeats. In 2018 San Andrés played in Primera C in which they also won the tournament with a 20–6 record.

Thanks to its Scottish heritage, Club San Andrés has the particularity of being one of the few clubs in South America to have its own Tartan.

== See also ==
- St. Andrew's Scots School
- St. Andrew's Athletic Club
