= Charles Douglas Moffatt =

English footballer

Charles Moffatt
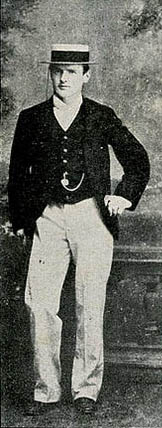
- Moffatt in 1892

Personal information
- Full name: Charles Douglas Moffatt
- Date of birth: 5 July 1870
- Place of birth: London, England
- Date of death: 1 March 1953 (aged 82)
- Place of death: Buenos Aires, Argentina
- Position: Inside forward

Senior career*
Years	Team	Apps	(Gls)
1891	St. Andrew's		
1892	Lomas		
1893–97	Flores		
1897–1901	Banfield		
- * Club domestic league appearances and goals

Charles Douglas Moffatt (5 July 1870 – 1 March 1953) was an English footballer, considered one of the pioneers of the sport in Argentina, active in the country as a player between 1891 and 1901.

== Career ==
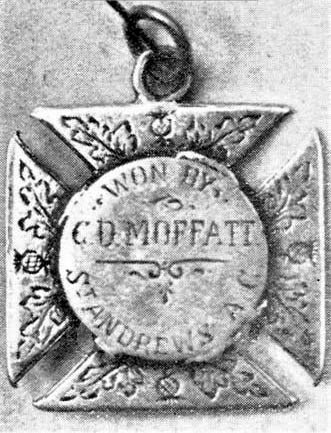
Medal awarded Moffatt after the first Primera División title ever won with St. Andrew's, 1891

Born in London, Moffatt arrived in Argentina in November 1889 at the age of 19. He worked in some British-owned companies in the country, such as Walter Sons & Co, Hume Brothers, the Buenos Aires Western Railway and last, the Buenos Aires Great Southern Railway from which he retired in 1928.

One of his workmates in the Southern Railway was Alex Lamont of St. Andrew's Scots School, which would later establish the Argentine Association Football League (the first football body in Argentina and predecessor of current Argentine Football Association) that organized the first Primera División championship in 1891.

Moffatt participated in that tournament playing for St. Andrew's as an inside forward. At the end of the season, St. Andrew's and Old Caledonians shared the first position therefore a final match was played to award the medals. St. Andrew's won the match by 3–1 with Moffatt scoring a hat trick.

Despite being the champion, St. Andrew's Athletic Club was dissolved that same year. After his tenure on St. Andrew's, Moffatt played for Lomas Athletic Club in 1892 and then moved to Flores Athletic Club. The last team where Moffatt played was Banfield (founded in 1896), where he played the 1897 and 1898 seasons with the team. When the second division (current Primera B Metropolitana) was created in 1899, Banfield registered a team there that would win the championship, with Moffatt as one of its players. The other teams that took part in the first tournament were English High School, Belgrano AC, Lomas, Lanús Athletic Club, Porteño, Maldonado Football Club, Scots School Club and Lomas' Barker Memorial School.

Moffat retired from football in 1901, although he continued practising sports, such as rowing, swimming, tennis and cricket. He is recognized as founder of the Gascón Lawn Tennis Club in Banfield, Buenos Aires and the Rowing Club in La Plata.

The "alma mater" of the League was Alec Lamont, who was employee of the Buenos Aires Great Southern Railway and also player of St. Andrew's. Almost all of Old Caledonians players were workers of the company that was doing the sewerage in Buenos Aires. The Buenos Aires and Rosario Railway players were also workers, who traveled from Campana to play the championship.

— Moffatt about the AAFL and the 1891 championship, in an interview with Félix Frascara published on El Gráfico, 1934

== Titles ==
St. Andrew's

- Primera División (1): 1891

Banfield

- Segunda División (1): 1899
