= The Federation of Private Entrepreneurs of La Paz =

The Federation of Private Entrepreneurs from La Paz (FEPLP)
- Abbreviation: FEPLP
- Formation: 1993
- Legal status: Civil Association
- Purpose: Promoting private business development
- Location: Chamber of Commerce Building, 1392 Mariscal Santa Cruz Avenue, 8th floor, Office # 801, La Paz, Bolivia.
- Region served: Bolivia
- Members: Affiliates
- Leader: Jaime Ascarrunz, President
- Website: www.feplp.com.bo

The Federation of Private Entrepreneurs of La Paz (Federación de Empresarios Privados de la Paz, FEPLP), is an independent and autonomous civil association that represents private businesses in La Paz, Bolivia.

A non-profit organization, the Federation of Private Entrepreneurs of La Paz was founded on November 25, 1993.

== About the FEPLP ==
On March 24, 2011, Luis Urquiza Valdivia was elected President of FEPLP, and Executive Director was Soraya Fernández Jáurgeui.

In March 2019, Jaime Ascarrunz was elected President of FEPLP for the 2019 and 2020 administrations. Hernando Salazar Soria served as the first Vice President.

2012 FEPLP affiliates include:

- Chamber of Exporters from La Paz (Cámara de Exportadores de La Paz)
- Chamber of Hotels from La Paz (Cámara de Hotelería de La Paz)
- Chamber of Tour Operators (Cámara de Operadores de Turismo Receptivo “Canotur La Paz”)
- Departmental Chamber of Construction from La Paz (Cámara Departamental de la Construcción de La Paz)
- Departmental Leather Industry Association (Asociación Departamental de Industrias del Cuero)
- Departmental Chamber of Industry from La Paz (Cámara Departamental de Industrias de La Paz)
- National Chamber of Commerce (Cámara Nacional de Comercio)
- Regional Chamber of Customs Brokers from La Paz (Cámara Regional de Despachantes de Aduana de La Paz)

2013 FEPLP affiliates include:

- Chamber of Hospitality of La Paz (Cámara de Hotelería de La Paz)
- Chamber of Tour Operators (Cámara de Operadores de Turismo Receptivo)
- Departmental Chamber of Commerce La Paz (Cámara Departamental de Comercio de La Paz)
- Departmental Chamber of Construction of La Paz (Cámara Departamental de la Construcción de La Paz, CADECO LA PAZ)
- Regional Chamber of Customs Brokers of La Paz (Cámara Regional de Despachantes de Aduana de La Paz, CRDA-LP)
- Departmental Chamber of Industries of La Paz (Cámara Departamental de Industrias de La Paz, CADINPAZ)
- Financial Institutions Bolivian Union Savings and Loan (Unión Boliviana de Entidades Financieras de Ahorro y Préstamo, UNIVIV)

== Recent initiatives ==
In 2011, the FEPLP was part of the jury panel for the Business Award "La Paz - Leader" 2011 "Promoting productivity and business competitiveness."

From 2011 to 2012, the FELPLP worked on the initiative Forum for the Development of the Department of La Paz, a partnership with government entities, foundations, and other organizations to undertake and design actions to articulate all different levels of government and public entities, and to prioritize actions that would lead to the development of La Paz.

The main participants were: the Association of Organizations of Ecological Producers of Bolivia (la Asociación de Organizaciones de Productores Ecológicos de Bolivia, AOPEB), the Joint Committee of Campesino Economic Organizations (Coordinadora Integral de Organizaciones Económicas Campesinas, CIOEC), the Federation of Private Entrepreneurs of La Paz (FEPLP), the government of La Paz, the Jubilee Foundation, the University of San Andrés (Universidad de San Andrés), and the Autonomous Government of the Municipality of La Paz (Gobierno Autónomo Municipal de La Paz, GAMLP),).

The FEPLP then coordinated roundtables to further discuss the topics concluded at the Forum. The priority areas taken into consideration were energy, tourism, textiles, water, organic food production, and the importance of improving productive supply chains.

Sponsors included the Embassy of Denmark, PNUD Art Bolivia, Al Invest IV Region Andina, and National Chamber of Commerce, Bolivia.
