= Maria Micaela Sviatschi =

Economist and academic

Academic background
- Education: Columbia University (MA, MPhil, PhD); Universidad de San Andrés (BS, MA)

Academic work
- Institutions: Princeton University
- Awards: Sloan Research Fellowship (2025)
- Website: www.micaelasviatschi.com

Maria Micaela Sviatschi is an economist. She is an Associate Professor of Economics and Public Affairs at Princeton University. Her research is in labor and development economics, with work on human capital, crime and violence, and gender-based violence.

== Education ==
Sviatschi grew up in Argentina. Sviatschi earned a B.S. in economics (2007) and an M.A. in economics (2009) from Universidad de San Andrés in Buenos Aires. She completed graduate study in economics at Columbia University, receiving an M.A. (2012), an M.Phil. (2013), and a Ph.D. (2017).

== Career ==
Sviatschi was a research fellow at the Inter-American Development Bank from 2009 to 2011. She served as a fellow with the International Crisis Group (Latin America and the Caribbean) beginning in 2017.

Sviatschi joined Princeton University as an assistant professor of economics and public affairs in 2018 and later became an associate professor. She is affiliated with research organizations including the National Bureau of Economic Research (NBER) and CESifo.

== Research ==
Sviatschi's research examines how exposure to illegal markets and violence affects long-run outcomes such as education, labor-market trajectories, and crime, as well as the effects of gender-based violence and access to justice on women and children. Her work includes research on childhood exposure to illegal labor markets and later criminal participation in Mexico, gang diffusion and violence associated with U.S. criminal deportations to El Salvador, and evaluations of women's justice centers in Peru and related impacts on violence and children's human capital outcomes.

One of her studies examined the relationship between adult-entertainment establishments and public safety, showing that strip-club openings in New York City were associated with short-run declines in reported sex crimes in nearby areas, while also prompting some methodological debate and criticism regarding data validation and interpretation.

== Awards and honors ==
Sviatschi was named a 2025 Sloan Research Fellow in economics for her empirical work on organized crime, non-state violence, and on policy interventions to reduce gender-based violence.

== Selected works ==
- Sviatschi, Maria Micaela (2022). "Making a NARCO: Childhood Exposure to Illegal Labor Markets and Criminal Life Paths." Econometrica 90(4): 1835–1878.
- Sviatschi, Maria Micaela (2022). "Spreading Gangs: Exporting U.S. Criminal Capital to El Salvador." American Economic Review 112(6): 1985–2024.
- Sviatschi, Maria Micaela; Trako, Iva (2024). "Gender violence, enforcement, and human capital: Evidence from women's justice centers in Peru." Journal of Development Economics 168: 103262.
