= James Gifford (sportsman) =

Argentine sportsman

Personal information
- Full name: James Gifford
- Born: 10 January 1864; Buenos Aires, Argentina
- Died: 18 April 1931 (aged 67); Buenos Aires, Argentina
- Batting: Right-handed

Domestic team information
- Years: Team
- 1897–1898: Marylebone Cricket Club

Career statistics
| Competition | First-class |
|---|---|
| Matches | 5 |
| Runs scored | 143 |
| Batting average | 17.87 |
| 100s/50s | –/– |
| Top score | 37 |
| Catches/stumpings | 5/– |
- Source: Cricinfo, 20 April 2021

James Gifford (10 January 1864 – 18 April 1931) was an Argentine sportsman who played football and first-class cricket.

== Career ==
Gifford was born at Buenos Aires in January 1864. He played club cricket for Buenos Aires Cricket Club and also played against touring sides. He spent time in England, where he played first-class cricket for the Marylebone Cricket Club in 1897 and 1898, making five appearances. Gifford scored 143 runs in these five matches, with a highest score of 37.

Gifford also played football for Flores Athletic Club and was the top goalscorer in the 1894 Argentine Primera División with 7 goals. Gifford died at Buenos Aires in April 1931.
