= Old Caledonians Football Club =

Football club (founded 1890)

Old Caledonians
- Full name: Old Caledonians Football Club
- Nickname(s): Caledonians, Calys
- Founded: 1890
- Dissolved: c. 1894; 131 years ago
- Ground: Barracas, Buenos Aires
- League: Primera División
- 1891: 1st (champion)

Old Caledonians Football Club (Note: The club has been historically named "Old Caledonians" although chronicles of the time (mostly published on The Standard, an English-language newspaper of Buenos Aires) refers to the club simply as "Caledonian" (see clippings here). Other journalist also name the club "Old Caledonian", without the "s".) (nicknamed Caledonians, or Calys) was a football club established in Argentina by a group of Scottish immigrants who were employees of British studio Bateman, Parsons & Bateman, hired to build the main drainage in the city of Buenos Aires.

Playing its home games in Barracas, Buenos Aires, Old Caledonians was the first official football champion of Argentina, when in 1891 the team shared the title with another with Scottish-origin club, St. Andrew's Athletic Club.

== History ==
The "Old Caledonians Football Club" was established in 1890 by a group of Scottish immigrants and employees of the Bateman, Parsons & Bateman studio, owned by English engineer John F. Bateman, who had been hired to design and carry out drainage and water supply works for the city of Buenos Aires in 1871. Bateman would be also committed to design the Palacio de Aguas Corrientes, a monumental water pumping station on Córdoba Avenue of Buenos Aires.

Old Caledonians is considered the first Argentine champion ever, winning (along with St. Andrew's) the first Primera División championship organized in 1891 by the "Argentine Association Football League", a body founded that same year by fellow student Alec Lamont, although it was disestablished soon after the end of the season. The five teams registered to play the tournament were (apart from OCFC), St. Andrew's, Buenos Aires & Rosario Railway, Belgrano Football Club (predecessor of current Belgrano Athletic Club) and Buenos Aires Football Club (not related to the first football club of Argentina founded in 1867). Hurlingham also registered but did not play any matches. The club had its field on Santa Elena street in the Barracas district of Buenos Aires. The field was placed near Sola station of Buenos Aires Great Southern Railway, used for freight services.

The practice of football in Argentina was spread thanks to Lamont and Alexander Watson Hutton, who later established Alumni, the most successful team until its dissolution in 1911.

The first championship started on 12 April and finished on 13 September 1891. At the end of the season, Old Caledonian and St. Andrew's shared the first position and the Association considered the title shared, but both teams had to play a new match only to award the medals. Therefore, both teams played a new game on September 13, 1891, and won by St. Andrew's by 3–1.

After the season concluded (and the AAFL dissolved that same year), Old Caledonians would not play any other official championship (now organised by the Argentine Football Association established in 1893). Only some records of few friendly matches in 1892 and 1893 survive, but it was believed that OCFC dissolved after the workers came returned to the United Kingdom when the Palacio de Aguas Corrientes building was finished in 1894.

== Honours ==
=== National ===
- Primera División
  - Winners (1): 1891

== Controversy ==
On its official website, the Argentine Football Association (AFA) only cites St. Andrew's as the first Argentine champion, although the title was shared with Old Caledonians and AFA did not organise that championship so it was established in February 1893.

Despite this, football historians state that the AAFL claimed both, Old Caledonians and St. Andrew's, as champions, so the last game was played only to define what team would be awarded medals.
