= St. Andrew's Scots School =

Saint Andrew's Scots School
- (Spanish: Escuela Escocesa San Andrés)
- the school's logo

Location
- Nogoyá 550; Olivos, Vicente López Partido, Buenos Aires Province CP 1636; Argentina; 34°30′18.6″S 58°28′59.7″W

Information
- Funding type: Private
- Mottoes: Thus one goes to the stars
- Religious affiliation: Presbyterian Church
- Patron saint: Saint Andrew
- Established: 1 September 1838 (188 years ago)
- Status: Open
- Dean: Lila Pinto
- Head of school: Esteban Aranda and Marisa Marquez
- Head teacher: James Thomas
- Grades: K-12
- Gender: Co-educational
- Average class size: 13-25
- Hours in school day: 7:50 until 15:30 or 16:30 (depending on schedule)
- Campus: 3
- Campus type: Field
- Houses: Brown, Dodds, Fleming, Monteith
- Colors: Navy blue and white
- Sports: Basketball, football, field hockey, rugby, swimming, volleyball
- Nickname: Santo
- Team name: Club San Andrés
- Affiliations: University of San Andrés
- Website: sanandres.esc.edu.ar

The Saint Andrew's Scots School (Spanish: Escuela Escocesa San Andrés), also referred to as Saint Andrew's, is an Argentine bilingual school in Olivos, Vicente López Partido, Buenos Aires Province.

Established in 1838 in downtown Buenos Aires, the school offers early childhood, primary and secondary education and has a university founded in 1988.

The school's campus is located in San Fernando, Tigre Partido, inside the urban area known as Greater Buenos Aires.

== History ==
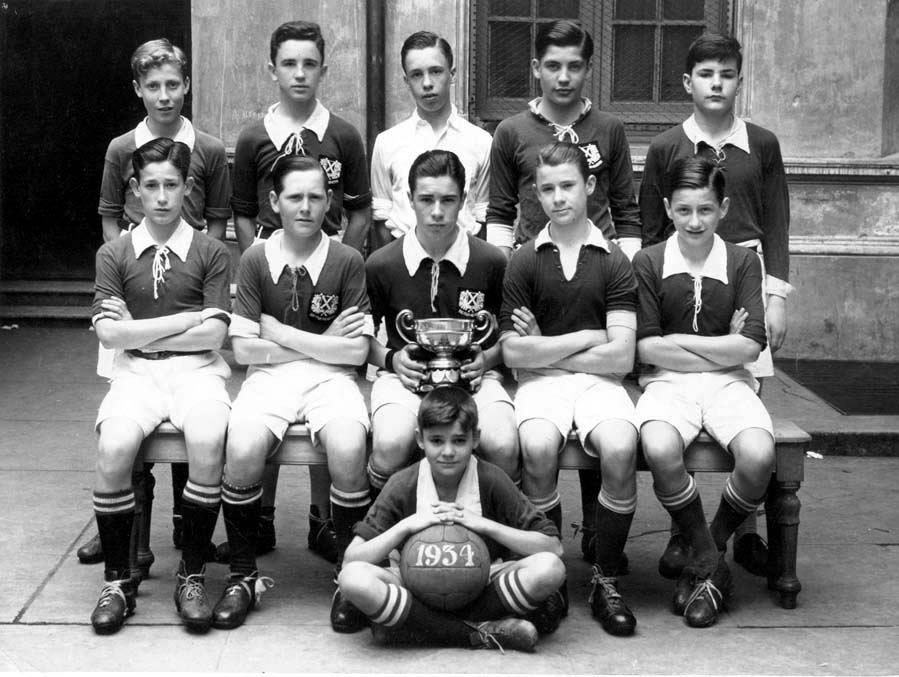
A youth football team of the school of 1934

The school was established in Argentina on September 1, 1838, by a group of Scottish immigrants who wanted to educate their children in their native language, culture and religion. At the beginning only girls were admitted, although the school accepted boys soon after.

The first location of the school was in la casa del boton de chimpan, in downtown Buenos Aires. The institution was later moved to the neighbourhood of Constitución, where children from many nationalities attended. The chapel moved to the streets of Belgrano and Perú where it still remains.

In 1882, Scotsman Alexander Watson Hutton (considered the father of Argentine football), arrived to Buenos Aires after being hired by St. Andrew's as headmaster. Hutton encouraged the teaching of sports at the school, which conflicted with the position of the authorities of not considering sports as important as he did. Due to his disagreeing with the policies of the establishment, Hutton resigned one year later. After leaving St. Andrew's, Hutton founded his own institution, the Buenos Aires English High School, where he applied his ideas on the teaching of sports in Argentina.

In 1947, the school moved to Olivos, Vicente López Partido, and in 1988 the institution opened the University of San Andrés. A new campus by Jeffrey J. Berk Arquitectos was inaugurated in 2018 with interior design by Rosan Bosch.

== Sports ==
=== Football pioneers ===
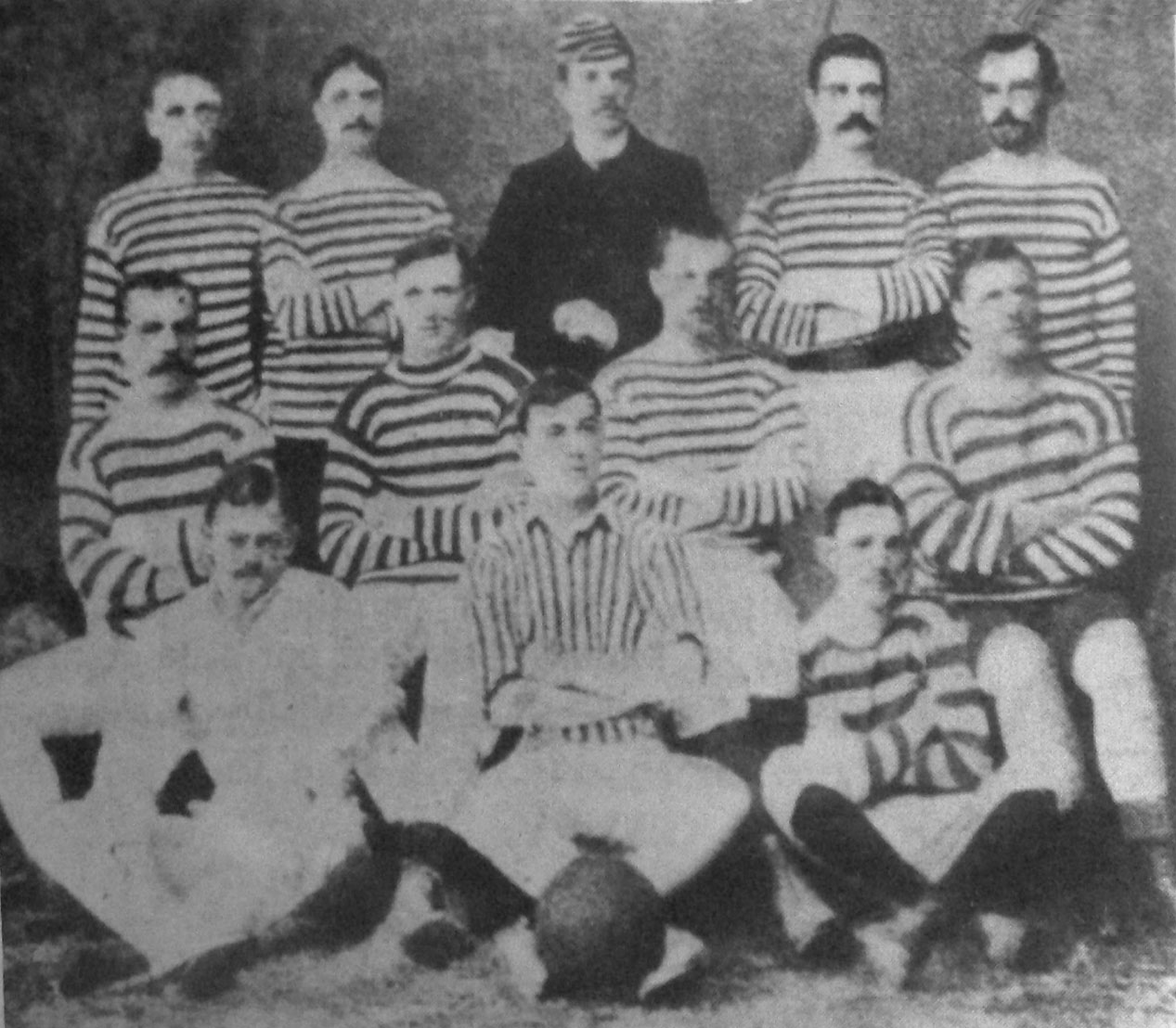
The team that won the first Primera División football championship in 1891

In 1890 the college established "St. Andrew's Athletic Club", whose football team was formed by railway workers. The sport had been introduced in Argentina in 1867, with St. Andrew's being one of the first clubs of the country.

St. Andrew's won the first Primera División championship organised in 1891, by the Argentine Association Football League, the first football association in the country and predecessor of current Argentine Football Association.

After winning the title (shared with Old Caledonians), St. Andrew's did not take part in official competitions until 1894, being dissolved soon after.

=== Present days ===
In 1911 the principal of the school, William Hardie, founded the Club San Andrés, a sports club that only admitted alumni and students. Sports currently practised at the club include rugby union, field hockey and association football. Its rugby team plays at the Torneo de la URBA Grupo I, the first division in the league system of the Unión de Rugby de Buenos Aires. Today the school has many sports such as athletics, badminton, basketball, association football, rugby union, swimming and volleyball.

== See also ==
- Christianity in Argentina
- Education in Argentina
- List of schools in Argentina
