= 1894 Argentine Primera División =

3rd season of top-tier football league in Argentina

Primera División
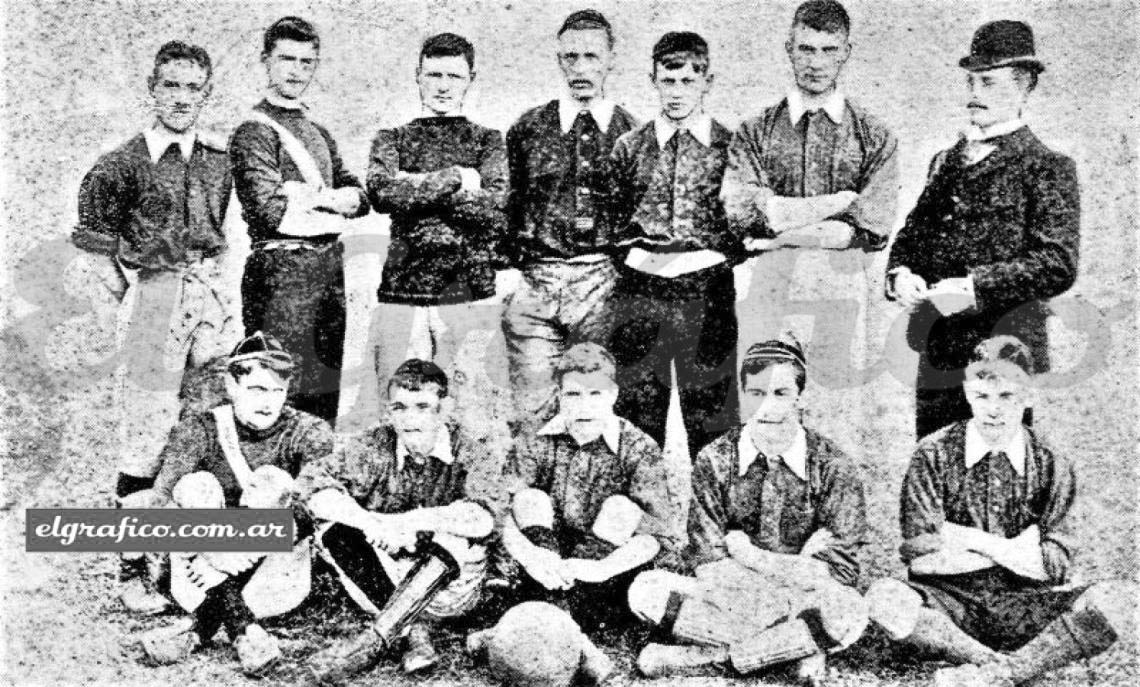
- Lomas A.C., champion
- Season: 1894
- Dates: 15 April – 9 September
- Champions: Lomas (2nd title)
- Relegated: (none)
- Matches: 30
- Goals: 112 (3.73 per match)
- Top goalscorer: (England) James Gifford (Flores)
- Biggest home win: Lomas 7−0 Retiro A.C.
- Biggest away win: Retiro AC 0−8 Flores

The 1894 Primera División was the 3rd season of top-flight football in Argentina. The season began on April 15 and ended on September 9.

The championship was won by Lomas Athletic, that become the first team to retain the league title. The runner-up was Rosario A.C., which made its debut at the tournament along with Retiro A.C. Most of the results of the games and the goals scored information have been lost.

The English High School club dissolved so the team did not take part of the tournament although its players joined Lanús A.C. and Lobos, which registered to the Association. St. Andrew's, the first Argentine champion, returned to the League. Buenos Aires and Rosario Railway left the tournament soon after it had started.

== Final standings ==
Pos	Team	Pld	W	D	L	GF	GA	GD	Pts	Qualification
1	Lomas (C)	10	8	2	0	38	4	+34	18	Champion
2	Rosario A.C.	10	6	2	2	21	8	+13	14	
3	Flores	10	6	0	4	27	21	+6	12	
4	Lobos	10	3	3	4	14	22	−8	9	
5	St. Andrew's	10	3	0	7	11	24	−13	6	
6	Retiro A.C.	10	0	1	9	1	33	−32	1	

(C) Champions
