= St. Andrew's Athletic Club =

Argentinian sports club

St. Andrew's
- Full name: St. Andrew's Athletic Club
- Founded: 1890
- Dissolved: c. 1894; 132 years ago
- Ground: Montes de Oca Ave. 1336, Barracas, Buenos Aires
- League: Primera División
- 1894: 5th
colours

St. Andrew's Athletic Club was a sports club established in Argentina by Scottish immigrants from the St. Andrew's Scots School, the oldest private school of Argentina.

Playing its home games in Barracas, Buenos Aires, St. Andrew's was the first official football champion of Argentina, when in 1891 the team shared the title with Old Caledonians.

== History ==
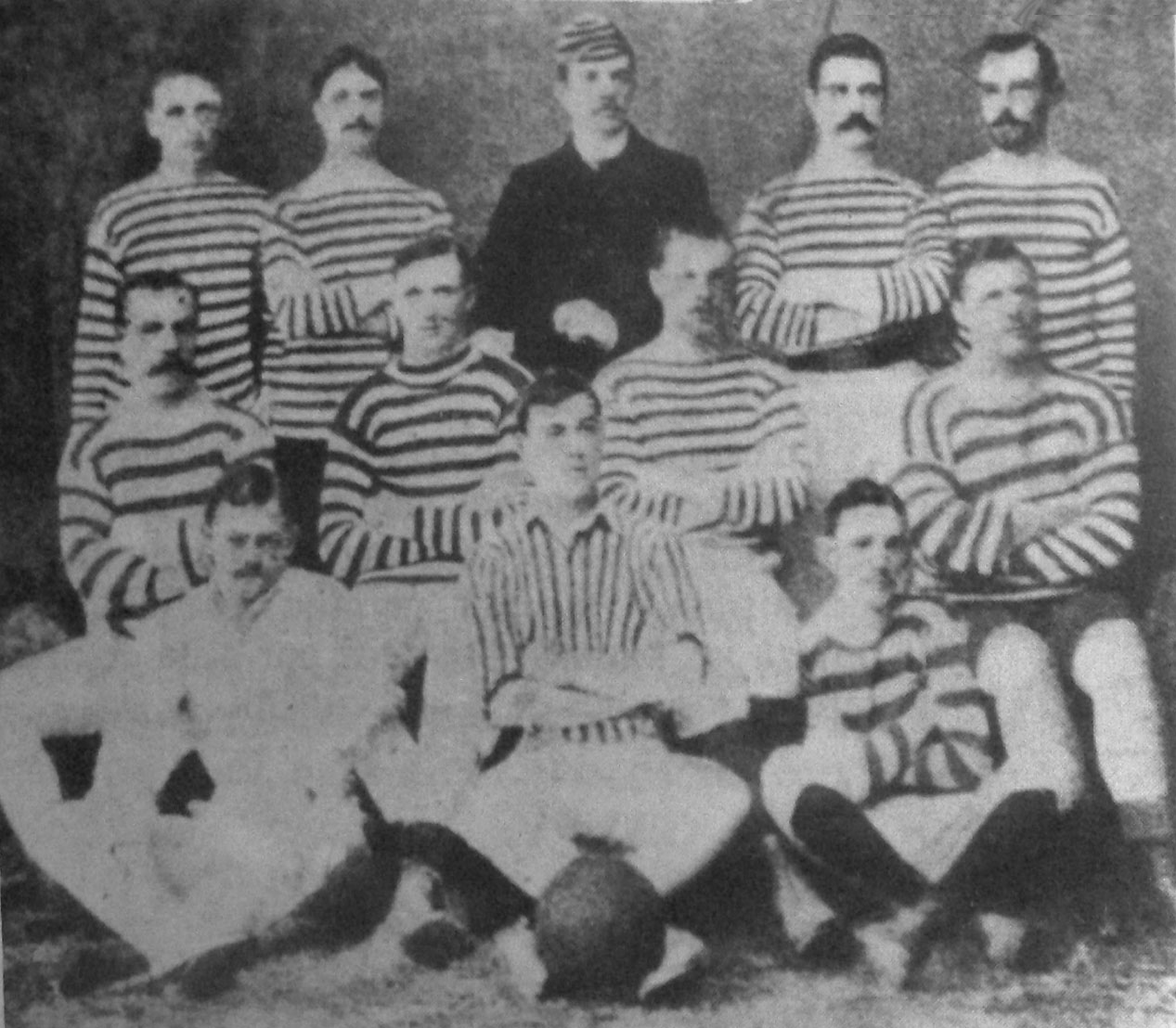
The team that won the first Argentine Primera División title in 1891

The "St. Andrew's Athletic Club" was established in 1890 by the homonymous school. The football team was formed by railway workers.

St. Andrew's A.C. is considered the first Argentine champion ever due to have won (along with Old Caledonians F.C.) the first Primera División championship organized in 1891 by the "Argentine Association Football League", a body founded that same year by fellow student Alec Lamont, although it was disestablished soon after the end of the season. The five teams registered to play the tournament were (apart from St. Andrew's), Old Caledonians, Buenos Aires & Rosario Railway, Belgrano Football Club (predecessor of current Belgrano Athletic Club) and Buenos Aires Football Club (not related to the first football club of Argentina founded in 1867). Hurlingham also registered but did not play any match. The club had its field in Montes de Oca Avenue 1336, Barracas neighborhood of Buenos Aires.

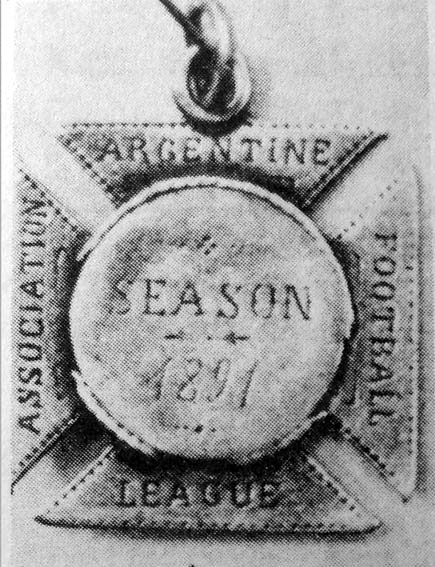
Medals awarded to St. Andrew's players when they won the 1891 final vs. Old Caledonians

The practice of football in Argentina was spread thanks to Lamont and Alexander Watson Hutton, who later established Alumni, the most successful team until its dissolution in 1911.

The first championship started on 12 April and finished on 13 September 1891. At the end of the season, St. Andrew's and Old Caledonians, a team formed by employees of the Scottish company that built the main drainage of Buenos Aires, shared the first position and the Association considered the title shared, but both teams had to play a new match only to award the medals. Therefore, St. Andrew's and Old Caledonians played a new game, played on September 13, 1891, and won by St. Andrew's by 3–1.

The team disputed only one more tournament in 1894, which was won by Lomas Athletic Club. St. Andrew's finished 5th over 6 teams, having lost 7 games of 10 played. After that season, St. Andrew's FC never played an official football championship again. It is believed that the club was dissolved soon after.

== Notable players ==
- Charles Douglas Moffatt: Scored all goals in the 3–1 over Old Caledonians at the 1891 playoff match. He also won the first Segunda División championship held in 1899, playing for Banfield.
- Alec Lamont: An employee of the Buenos Aires Great Southern Railway and also player of St. Andrew's, Lamont was the alma mater for the creation of the Argentine Association Football League, the first football association in the country.

== Honours ==
=== National ===
- Primera División
  - Winners (1): 1891

== Legacy ==
The first Independiente badge was inspired on St. Andrew's

Being the first Argentine champion gave St. Andrew's fame and prestige. The first crest of Independiente (with the "IFBC – Independiente Foot-Ball Club" initials) was inspired on St. Andrew's. In the 1990s, the original crest of the club was revived for the away jerseys, having been used as emblem since then.

In 2013, the Argentine Football Association listed on its website St. Andrew's as the first Argentine champion, although the title was shared with Old Caledonians and the Association did not organise that championship so the body was established in February 1893.

== See also ==
- St. Andrew's Scots School
- Club San Andrés
