= Juan Carlos Howard =

Argentine musician

Juan Carlos Howard (12 October 1912 - 2 November 1986) was an Argentine tango pianist, bandleader and composer.

== Early life ==
Juan Carlos was born in the San Isidro Partido of Buenos Aires to parents Juan and Lidia Cerradi. They encouraged him to play the piano and he made his radio debut at the age of 12.

== Career ==
Juan Carlos Howard played with many bands including those of Juan d'Arienzo, Roberto Zerrillo, Francisco Lomuto and Héctor Varela. He also led his own band on more than one occasion.

He composed many tangos including the popular hits "Y te parece todavía" and "Melodía oriental".
