= Buenos Aires and Rosario Railway A.C. =

Buenos Aires and Rosario Railway
- Full name: Buenos Aires and Rosario Railway Athletic Club
- Founded: 1888
- Dissolved: 1896; 130 years ago (merged to form Belgrano Athletic Club)
- Ground: Campana
- President: G. Hunt
- League: Primera División
- 1893: 5th

The Buenos Aires and Rosario Railway Athletic Club was a sports club established by workers of the homonymous railway company that operated in center and northern Argentina by then.

The club had football pitch located in the neighbourhood of Belgrano, Buenos Aires, and also in the city of Campana, distant 75 km (47 mi) from the capital city. BA&RR was also a predecessor of current Belgrano Athletic Club.

According with the list of clubs published on periodical River Plate Sport & Pastime in 1893, the colors of the club were yellow and black. On the other hand, British-origin newspaper The Standard stated in August 1888 that sports practised at BA&RR were football, cricket, and tennis.

== History ==
According to existing records, the club played its first football match in August 1888 v 'Ferrocarril del Sud Club' (another railway team, formed by workers of Buenos Aires Great Southern Railway), that is taken as the date of establishment of BA&RR. That game is also recognised as the first football match played in the history of Campana, while the BA&RR is regarded as the first club formed in the city. Although there are no records about the exact location of the BA&RR field, it is believed it was at the north of the city, near the railway workshops and the Paraná River, on the same place where the Campana Boat Club is located nowadays. The BA&RR rented a land on Virrey del Pino and Superí in the neighborhood of Belgrano, Buenos Aires, where the club played its home games, apart from Campana.

The BA&RR team was one of the four that took part in the first Argentine Primera División championship (which was also the first official competition outside the United Kingdom) held in 1891. During that inaugural season, BA&R played 8 matches, with 2 wins and 4 loses.

In the 1893 championship (the 2nd season so no tournament was held in 1892), BA&R made a poor campaign finishing last with no wins and 6 loses within 8 matches. The team did not participate in the 1894 and 1895 seasons, and in 1896 some members of the club merged with St. Lawrence Club (a neighbour institution which had been formed shortime ago) to form Belgrano Athletic Club, which took over the land (and field) rented by the BA&RR on Virrey del Pino and Superí to set their headquarters.
