= Argentine Association Football League =

Former football governing body of Argentina

Argentina
- Founded: 7 March, 1891
- Folded: c. September 1891; 135 years ago
- Headquarters: Buenos Aires
- President: F.L. Wooley

The Argentine Association Football League was the first football association of Argentina and predecessor of current Argentine Football Association. The association has a historic importance in football for having organised the first official championship outside the United Kingdom (which has the oldest football competition, the FA Cup established in 1871).

== History ==
By the 1890s, more than 20,000 inhabitants of Argentina were British, most of them employees of railway companies. They had introduced several sports to the country, with football among them.

On 7 March 1891, the act of foundation of the "Argentine Association Football League" was signed. Board members were F.L. Wooley (president), Rovenscraf, Arcels, Mc Ewen, Hughes, Mc Intoch and Alec Lamont.

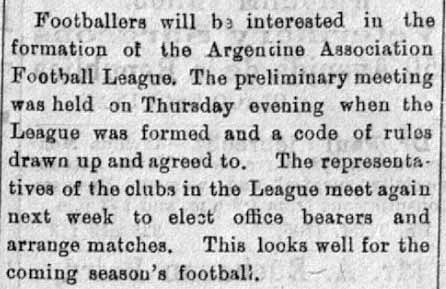
Meeting to form a football league in Argentina, as chronicled by The Standard, 14 February 1891

The recently formed Association set three objectives:

- The organisation of a championship played regularly
- The establishment of an institution to rule the championship created
- A code of regulations

The first Argentine football championship began on 12 April 1891, with five teams contesting the competition, they were, Old Caledonians, Buenos Aires and Rosario Railway, Buenos Aires Football Club, (Note: Not related neither to the pioneer football club nor to the rugby club.) Belgrano Football Club, (Note: Not related (but probably a predecessor) to Belgrano Athletic Club.) and St. Andrews.

The "alma mater" of the League was Alec Lamont, who was employee of the Buenos Aires Great Southern Railway and also player of St. Andrew's. Almost all of Old Caledonians players were workers of the company that was doing the sewerage in Buenos Aires. The Buenos Aires and Rosario Railways players were also workers, who traveled from Campana to play the championship.

— Charles Douglas Moffatt, the MVP of the 1891 final, in an interview with Félix Frascara published on El Gráfico, 1934

After organising the first championship (won by Old Caledonian and St. Andrew's), the Association was dissolved. Therefore no championship would be held in 1892 until a new association with the same name (currently Argentine Football Association) was established in 1893.

== See also ==
- Argentine Football Association
- 1891 Argentine Primera División
- Football in Argentina
