= University of San Andrés =

Private university in Argentina

Coordinates: 34°26′48″S 58°31′46″W

- Universidad de San Andrés
- Motto: Quaerere Verum ("Seek the Truth")
- Type: Private
- Established: September 1, 1988
- Religious affiliation: Presbyterian Church
- Rector: Lucas S. Grosman
- Students: 4119
- Location: Victoria, Buenos Aires, Argentina
- Campus: Suburban
- Website: udesa.edu.ar

The University of San Andrés (Spanish: Universidad de San Andrés) is a private Argentine university founded in 1989. The principal campus is located in Victoria, Buenos Aires, directly on the Río de la Plata in the Greater Buenos Aires metropolitan region. In addition, UdeSA operates other campuses in Buenos Aires and Nordelta.

By 2015, the university enrolled about 1,033 undergraduates and 897 graduates.

The university follows a liberal arts education model and is home to the Max von Buch Library.

== History ==
The university is a daughter institution of St. Andrew's Scots School, an institution founded by Scottish immigrants in 1838. It is named after Saint Andrew, the patron saint of Scotland, and its crest is composed of the Saltire (the flag of Scotland), and thistles (the national flower of Scotland). The current institution was formally established on September 1, 1988, by the Scottish Civil Educational Association of San Andrés (ACEESA). This entity was superseded in 2010 by the University of San Andrés Foundation(FUdeSA).

The MBA programs taught by the university are accredited by the London-based Association of MBAs(AMBA).

== Ranking ==
According to the QS World University Rankings, UdeSA is the fourth best private university in the country.

== Courses offered ==
=== Undergraduate degrees ===
The university offers undergraduate degrees in the following disciplines:

- Business Administration
- Political Science
- Education
- Communications
- Public Accounting
- Economics
- Humanities
- International Relations
- Marketing
- Human Resources
- Finances
- Law
- Design
- Behavioural sciences

=== Graduate degree ===
- Doctorate in Education
- Doctorate in Economics
- Doctorate in History
- Master's in Administration and Public Policy
- Master's in Business Administration
- Master's and Specialization in Business Law
- Master’s in Economics
- Master's and Specialization in Education
- Master's in Organizational Studies
- Master's in Historical Research and Postgraduate History Program
- Master's in Journalism
- Master's in International Relations and Negotiations
- Master's and Specialization in Finance
- Master's and Specialization in Technological Services and Telecommunications Management
- Master's in Marketing and Communication and Specialization in Marketing
- Specialization in Strategic Human Resources Management
- Specialization in Non-Profit Organizations (in association with Torcuato di Tella University and CEDES),
- Program in Human Factors and Organizations in Risk Management
- Program in Brazilian Culture

=== Specializations ===
- Global Business Management
- Finance, Accounting and Management Control
- Marketing, Communication and Sales
- People Development and Management
- Real Estate
- Agribusiness and Food Industry
- Innovation and Entrepreneurship
- Social Innovation

== Faculty ==
University of San Andrés has 596 academics, of which 76 are full-time researchers, divided in seven departments:

- Department of Administration
- Department of Social Sciences
- Department of Law
- Department of Economics
- Department of Humanities
- Department of Mathematics and Sciences
- School of Education

Chairman members include: Sebastián García-Dastugue. Ph.D. in Business Administration, Ohio State University. Roberto Bouzas. M.A. in Economics, Cambridge University. Lucas S. Grosman. Ph.D. in the Science of Law (JSD), Yale University. Federico Weinschelbaum. Ph.D. in Economics, University of California (Los Angeles). Eduardo Zimmermann. D. Phil in Modern History, University of Oxford. Ricardo Fraiman Maus. Doctor in Mathematic Sciences, Universidad de Buenos Aires. Jason Beech. Ph.D. in Education, University of London.

== Foreign Studies ==
The department of foreign studies offers students one of the most sought-after exchange programs in Argentina. Programs Under Academic Agreements Include:

=== North America ===
- Canada: HEC Montréal, Schulich School of Business, York University, Université de Montréal, University of Guelph
- United States of America: Harvard University, Annemberg School of Communication, University of Southern California, Rice University, Babson College, Columbia University, University of Kansas, New York University, University of Illinois, The College of New Jersey, University of Pennsylvania, The Wharton School of Business, University of Pittsburgh, University of Maryland, University of Miami, University of Washington, Kellogg School of Management

=== Europe ===
- United Kingdom: St. Antony's College, Oxford University, University of Bath, University of Edinburgh, University of Kent, University of Leeds, University of London, Regent's College, University College London, University of Westminster
- France:ESCP-Europe, Institut d'études politiques de Paris, Montesquieu–Bordeaux IV, Université de Toulouse, Jean Moulin University Lyon 3
- Spain: Universidad Autónoma de Madrid, Universidad de Deusto, Universidad de Las Palmas de Gran Canaria, Universitat de València, Universitat Pompeu Fabra
- Italy: University of Bologna, Bocconi University
- Germany: Frankfurt School of Financial Management, WHU- Otto Beisheim Graduate School of Management
- Austria, Sweden, Russia, Czech Republic, Portugal, Belgium, Switzerland, Norway, and The Netherlands: FH Joaneum University of Applaied Sciences, Jönköping University, Saint-Petersburg State University, University of New York in Prague, Czech Republic, Universidade Nova de Lisboa, Université Libre de Bruxelles, University of St. Gallen, University of Oslo, Vrije Universiteit

=== Latin America ===
- Mexico: Centro de Investigación y Docencia –CIDE-, Universidad de las Américas, Instituto Tecnológico y de Estudios Superiores de Monterrey
- Brazil: Desarrollo –Instituto de Capacitación y Estudios, Fundação Getulio Vargas, Escola de Administração de Empresas de São Paulo, Fundação Getulio Vargas, Universidade do Vale do Rio dos Sinos, Universidade Federal da Bahía, Universidade Federal de Rio Grande do Sul, Univeresidade Federale do Río de Janeiro, Brazil
- Chile: Universidad de Desarrollo, Universidad Diego Portales,
- Colombia, Ecuador, Paraguay, Uruguay: Universidad de los Andes, Desarrollo –Instituto de Capacitación y Estudios, Universidad Católica de Santiago de Guayaquil, Universidad de Montevideo, Universidad ORT

=== Australia ===
- Griffith University, Queensland, Carnegie Mellon

== Recognition ==
The library was recognized by the Andrew W. Mellon Foundation though their Program for Latin American Libraries and Archives. The university provides more than 70 study abroad programs with universities in Europe, North America, Latin America, and Australia.

San Andrés was the first institution in Argentina to offer a double degree accredited by Grandes Ecoles ESCP-Europe.

== See also ==
- Scottish settlement in Argentina
- St. Andrew's Scots School
