= Flores Athletic Club =

Argentine sports club from Flores, Buenos Aires

Flores
- Full name: Flores Athletic Club
- Sports: Cricket; Polo; Football; Rugby union; Tennis (Note: The exact period of tennis at Flores is unknown, but the sport is mentioned as one of Flores' sections on River Plate Sport & Pastime #67, p. 10 - dated 12 October 1892.)
- Founded: 1893
- Folded: 1907; 119 years ago
- Based in: Hurlingham, Buenos Aires
- Arena: Flores Old Ground
- Championships: Polo: Abierto Argentino (1): 1894

Flores Athletic Club was an Argentine sports club from Flores, Buenos Aires. The club was pioneer in the practise of some sports that would become popular in Argentina, such as football (competing in some of the first official championships held), cricket, rugby union, polo, and tennis.

== History ==
=== Origin: the polo years ===
In 1860 a great English community lived in the "porteños" neighbourhoods of Caballito and Flores, most of them working in commerce activities. They usually spent summertime in their country houses located in Barracas, Buenos Aires, Belgrano, Buenos Aires and Flores, which was the favourite place of Argentine high society families to spend their free time. Some of the biggest palaces (such as "Miraflores", built in 1886 and currently a school, or "Las Lilas") had been erected in that zone.

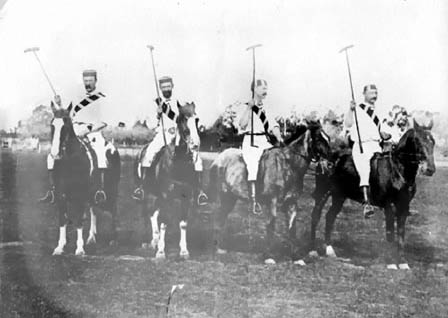
The Flores polo team of 1899

The Flores Athletic Club was born in Caballito neighbourhood, next to current club Club Ferro Carril Oeste. Flores established in the same lot where in 1875 the first polo match had been played in Argentina.

Flores AC was cited for the first time by English language newspaper The Standard on 15 January 1893, referring to a cricket match that would be disputed between Flores and Buenos Ayres al Rosario Railway. So the data of foundation of the club could be established between 1892 and 1893, so Flores AC had never been mentioned before by the English community in Buenos Aires.

Other matches recorded by The Standard were against Lomas Athletic that same year, and the only title won by the club, the 1894 Campeonato Argentino Abierto de Polo, defeating local team Cañada de Gómez by 6–0 at the final. The line-up was: J. Bennett, F.J. Bennett, T. Scott-Robson and Hugo Scott-Robson.

Other polo match covered by the newspaper was played in 1896 against Rangers Polo Club.

=== Football ===
Football kit

Flores AC also had a football team, which played its home games in Caballito. The club was one of the founding members of the Argentine Football Association (with football pioneer Alexander Watson Hutton as first president) in 1893.

The football team debuted on 22 April 1893, being defeated by Quilmes Rovers (now Quilmes Atlético Club) by 4–2. The line-up was: Brown, Gordon, Syer; Gahan, Goddard, Murphy; Fothergill, Jordan, Allen, Bartman, Wilson. Flores AC took part in Primera División Argentina from 1893 to 1897, achieving a 2nd position in the year of its debut. Flores would be also placed 2nd. in 1896. 1897 was its last year in Argentine Primera División.

=== Rugby ===
Rugby kit

The first registered rugby union match played by Flores was on July 19, 1896, against Buenos Aires FC (then merged into Buenos Aires Cricket & Rugby Club). The game was disputed in the Caballito stadium, and the line-up was: B.F. Taylor, G.F. Elliot, Leslie Wilson, P.M. Roth, F.W. Fothergill; D. King, F. Chantriel; F.E. Jones, J.B. Faram, A.D. Jones; R. Colson, E.G. Kinch; C. McKenzie, D.R. Henderson, S. Willes.

The Flores AC stadium was also used by the Buenos Aires FC (where the team had played its first match against Southern Railway, in 1886) to dispute the derby with Rosario Athletic Club.

On 10 April 1899 the "River Plate Rugby Championship" (current Unión Argentina de Rugby) was established in Argentina, organising the first rugby tournament (Torneo de la URBA) that same year. The role of Flores AC in the establishment of the league is still discussed. The "Centro de Estudios para la Historia del Rugby" (CEHR) states that Flores was one of the founder members along with Belgrano AC, Rosario AC, Lomas and Buenos Aires FC while other sources (including bodies Unión Argentina de Rugby and Unión de Rugby de Buenos Aires) do not include Flores as a founding member, as they do with the other four team mentioned.

It was one of the founder members although the club only played in the first edition held in 1899. The team debuted against Belgrano Athletic and the line-up for that historic game was: N. Murphy, A. Coste, F. Leitch, George F. Elliot, J.Elliot, D. King, W.H. Goddard, C. Mackenzie, B. Gwyn, E.N. Neild, B. Campbell, H. Hampson, C. Thurner, A.O. Jones, and J. Negrón.

=== Dissolution ===
In 1907 Flores Athletic sold some of its facilities to Club Ferro Carril Oeste, for m$n 700. It is believed that the club was dissolved after this transaction.

== Titles ==
- Campeonato Argentino Abierto de Polo (1): 1894

== Notable sportsmen ==
- George Fleetwood Elliot: He practised athletics and rugby union (1896–99).
- James Gifford: He played first-class cricket and football.
- Charles Douglas Moffatt: Born in London in 1870, he arrived to Argentina in 1889, being a pioneer of Argentine football so he played for St. Andrew's during the first Primera División tournament held in 1891. He then played in Lomas and Flores before moving to Banfield where he retired from football in 1901.

== See also ==
- Flores Old Ground
