= Lomas Athletic Club =

Argentinian rugby union & sports club, based in Buenos Aires

(Argentina) Lomas
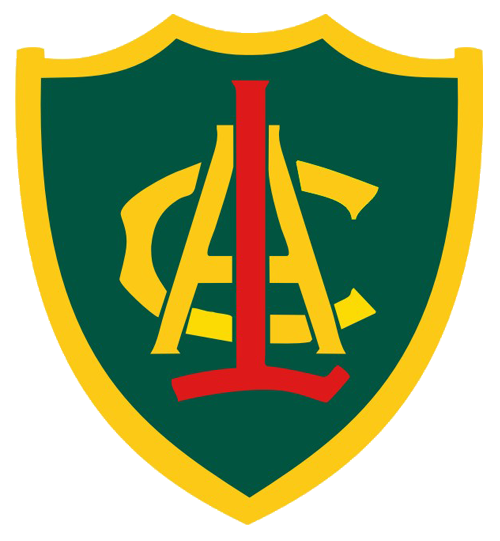
- Full name: Lomas Athletic Club
- Union: URBA
- Nickname: Tricolor (Tricoloured)
- Founded: 15 March 1891; 135 years ago
- Ground(s): Ricardo Esperón, Longchamps (Capacity: ?)
- President: Patricio Campbel
- League: Primera A
- 2026: 3rd. (to promotion playoffs)
Team kit

Official website
- lomasac.com.ar

Lomas Athletic Club is an Argentine sports club based in the Lomas de Zamora district of Greater Buenos Aires. One of Argentina's oldest clubs still in existence, Lomas is one of the four institutions that founded the "River Plate Rugby Championship" (current Argentine Rugby Union) in 1899, The rugby union team currently plays in Primera A, the second division of the URBA league system.

Lomas Athletic is also considered the first big football team of Argentina, having won six consecutive titles between 1893 and 1898 (also finishing unbeaten in all of them), although the team disaffiliated from the Association in 1909 and the sport is no longer practised at the club.

Lomas has also had a prevailing role in field hockey, with the female section being the most winning team in Argentina with 20 Metropolitano championships won. Nevertheless, in 2014 the first team was relegated to the second division after playing Italiano.

Lomas field hockey teams compete at tournaments organised by the Buenos Aires Hockey Association (AHBA).

Apart from rugby and hockey, other activities practised at the club are bowls, contract bridge, cricket, golf, swimming and tennis.

== History ==
=== Foundation ===
The arrival of English emigrants to Argentina had taken place in the period after Argentina's independence from Spain through the 19th century. Unlike many other waves of immigration to Argentina, English immigrants were not usually leaving England because of poverty or persecution, but went to Argentina as industrialists and major landowners.

When English settled up in a village, they usually established a club. Following those non-written rules, the English community living in Lomas de Zamora had founded the "Lomas Cricket Club", the first club in the district, exclusively for the practise of that sport. Football pioneer James Hogg was among its founders.

On March 15, 1891, they also establish the "Lomas Academy Athletic Club" (derived from the homonymous school). The founding members were John Cowes, Thomas Dodds (who was also its first president) and James Gibson. They were assisted by the directors of Lomas Academy School, R.L. Goodfellow and W.W. Hayward. The club changed its name to "Lomas Athletic Club" two years later.

The sports initially practised were cricket, rugby union, association football, golf and tennis. Lomas had two different fields, one for cricket and tennis and other for rugby exclusively. In 1892 the club changed its name to "Lomas Athletic Club" and moved to another field located two blocks from the railway station. Lomas acquired a land placed in Arenales and Alberti streets in 1897, where it moved. The club has remained there since then.

Scottish Professor Alexander Watson Hutton is generally recognised as the "father" of Argentine football, after having founded the "English High School" where students formed their own team, Alumni. At the same time, English W.W. Hayward, founder of "Lomas Academy" taught to play football to his students. Those alumni would later form the "Lomas Athletic" team.

The first rugby match played by Lomas was in August 1891 against Quilmes. The match was won by Lomas with a try conversion, which count 2 points by then.

=== First success in football: 1893–98 ===
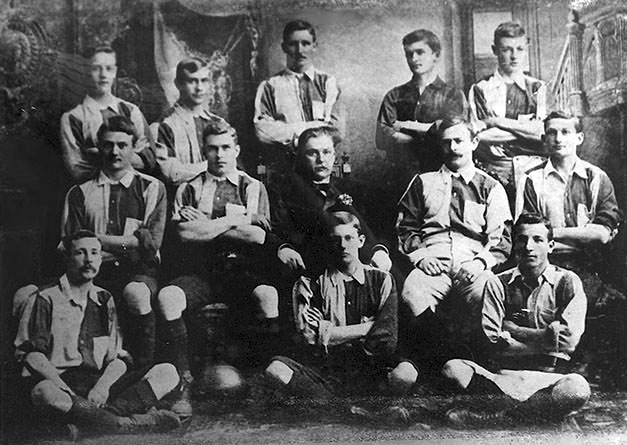
Lomas football team in 1893, which won its first championship that year

On February 21, 1893, the Argentine Football Association (presided by Alexander Watson Hutton) was created in order to continue the organization of football tournaments (as the old "Association Argentine Football League" had done in 1891 although it was dissolved that same year). Lomas won the 1893 championship totalizing 15 points in 8 games played. Five titles followed that, in 1894, 1895, 1897 and 1898. Within those years, the Lomas Athletic team won 46 games (over 60 played), establishing a record for Argentine football.

In 1895 Lomas Athletic registered other team from the club, named "Lomas Academy" (honoring the first name of the institution), which finished 2nd that same season and won the title one year later, relegating it "elder brother" Lomas Academy to the 2nd. place. The 1895 and 1896 tournaments were the only official championships played by Lomas Academy. Although no records survive, it is believed that the team was dissolved soon after winning the title.

=== Predominance of rugby and football decline ===
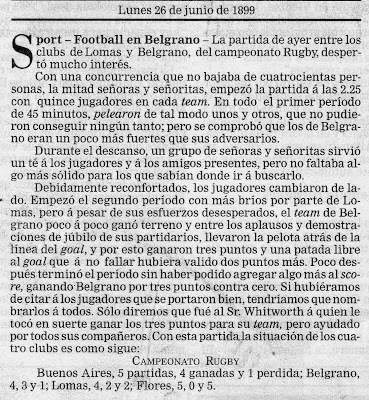
Chronicle of the match between Lomas and Belgrano, published by La Nación in 1899. Lomas won the tournament, being the first Argentine champion ever.

In 1899, along with Buenos Aires, Belgrano, Rosario and Flores, Lomas became founding member of the "River Plate Rugby Championship", which would become today's Argentine Rugby Union. That same year the club won the first championship organized by the union.

Despite being the most successful club during the first years of Argentine football, Lomas suffered from the slow rise of rugby within the institution. By 1909 rugby became the predominant sport and the football section was disbanded after being relegated to second division that same year. Lomas finished last with only 8 points over 18 matches played, having won only one game. The largest defeats during the championship were at the hands of San Isidro (7–1) and Alumni (8–1).

Despite having only competed in 17 championships, Lomas Athletic is still the 8th most Primera División winning team with 5 championships won, apart from the title obtained in 1896 by its subsidiary team, Lomas Academy.

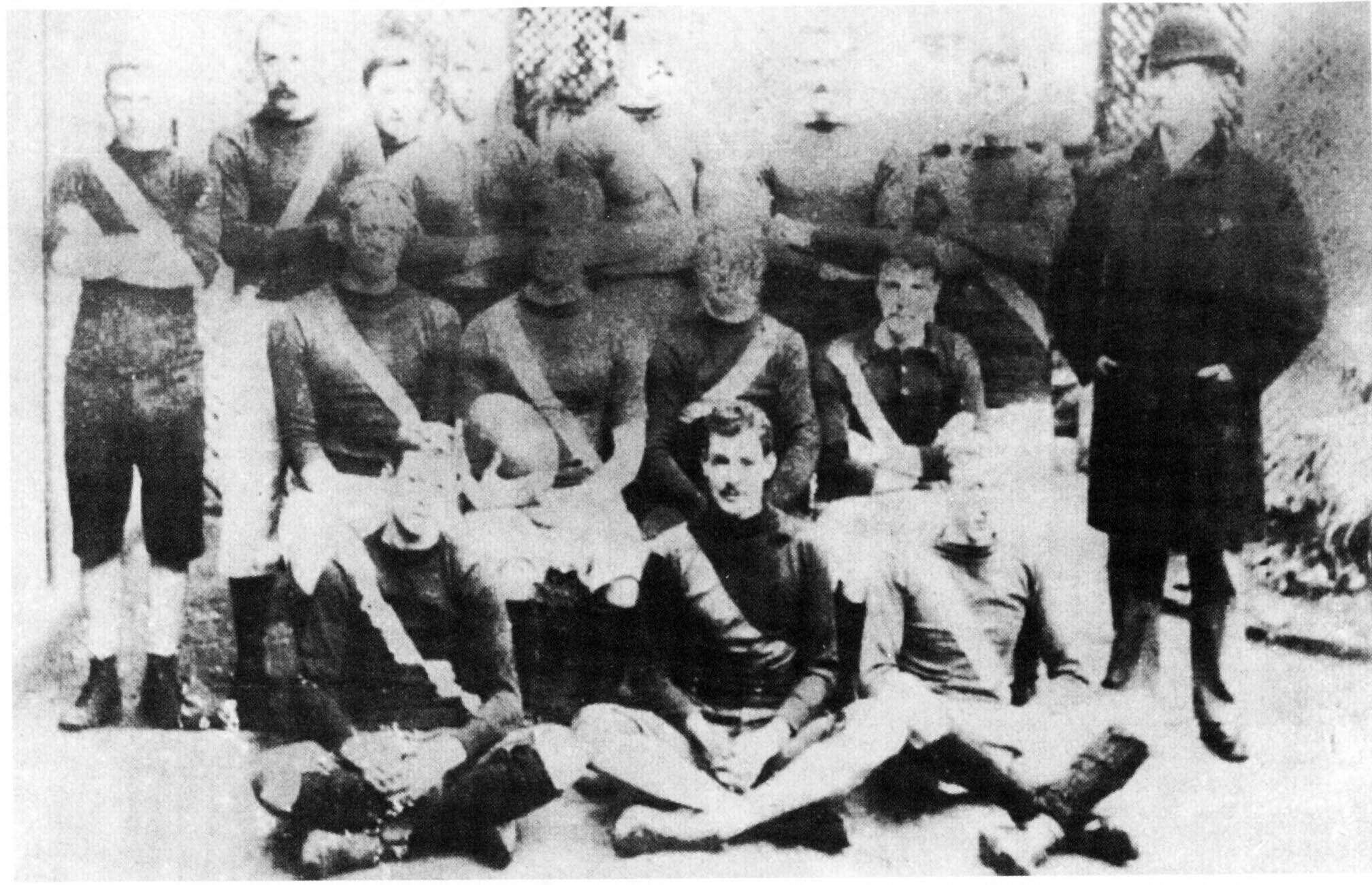
The rugby team that won the first Argentine championship held in 1899

The football squad continued playing the official tournament but Lomas finished in the last positions at the end of each championship. Last football squad's appearance was on July 9, 1909, during the Copa de Competencia Jockey Club. Lomas Athletic lost its match 18–0 at the hands of Estudiantes de Buenos Aires. This was the largest defeat suffered by an Argentine football team to date (including professional era). But it was also the last day Lomas played football officially.

In 1913 Lomas Athletic rugby team won its second title, the last to date.

Since the 1930s field hockey has largely become the club's predominant sport, relegating rugby to a secondary place. Lomas has won 17 first division titles to date, the last in 2006.

Lomas Athletic Club is also well known for being a founding member of all the sports associations where the club has a team, including Asociación Argentina de Golf, Asociación Argentina de Tenis, Unión Argentina de Rugby, Asociación de Cricket Argentino, and Asociación Amateur Argentina de Hockey sobre Césped.

=== Cricket ===
The club's cricket ground held a first-class match in 1912 when Argentina played the Marylebone Cricket Club, with the visiting Marylebone Cricket Club from England winning by 2 wickets. This is the only first-class match to have been played there. Still in use to the present day, the ground hosted various local and touring sides in the 20th century, matches in both the Americas and the South American Championships.

== Uniform evolution ==
=== Football ===
During its first years in Primera División, Lomas wore a blue and white jersey, then switching to green, gold and red which would become its traditional colors.

1891–96	1893 (Note: It is unclear if this jersey was worn for the entire championship or just for some games)	1897–1909 (Note: In 1897 the club adopted its green, gold and red colors that have remained to date. Lomas closed its football section in 1909 to focus on rugby union. In 2011, a throwback edition of the football striped jersey was worn by the senior rugby squad to commemorate the 120th anniversary of the club.)

== Facilities ==
Lomas has three facilities which are detailed below:

- Arenales: Headquarters of the club. It includes one synthetic grass rugby field (for training and children/youth teams) and one field hockey ground (where the first squad plays its home games). Other activities hosted are bowls, cricket, swimming and tennis.
- Longchamps: in the homonymous district. The main seat of rugby, where the senior squad plays its home games.
- Ezeiza: in the homonymous city, for the practise of golf.

== Honours ==
=== Cricket ===
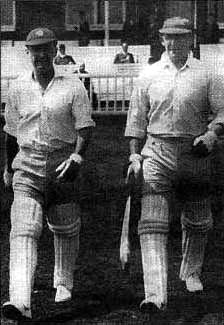
Part of the cricket team, 1948–49 champions

- Primera División (23): 1897–98, 1899–1900, 1901–02, 1917–18, 1922–23, 1947–48, 1948–49, 1951–52, 1962–63, 1964–65, 1972–73, 1977–78, 1978–79, 1979–80, 1990–91, 1994–95, 2000–01, 2002–03, 2003–04, 2009–10, 2012–13, 2014–15, 2018–19

=== Field hockey ===
Women's

- Metropolitano Primera División (20): 1938, 1977, 1979, 1983, 1984, 1985, 1986, 1989, 1991, 1992, 1993, 1996, 1997, 2001, 2003, 2005, 2006, 2019, 2022, 2024

=== Football ===
- Primera División (6): 1893, 1894, 1895, 1896, 1897, 1898

=== Rugby union ===
- RPRU (2): 1899, 1913
