= 1891 Argentine Primera División =

1st season of top-tier football league in Argentina

Primera División
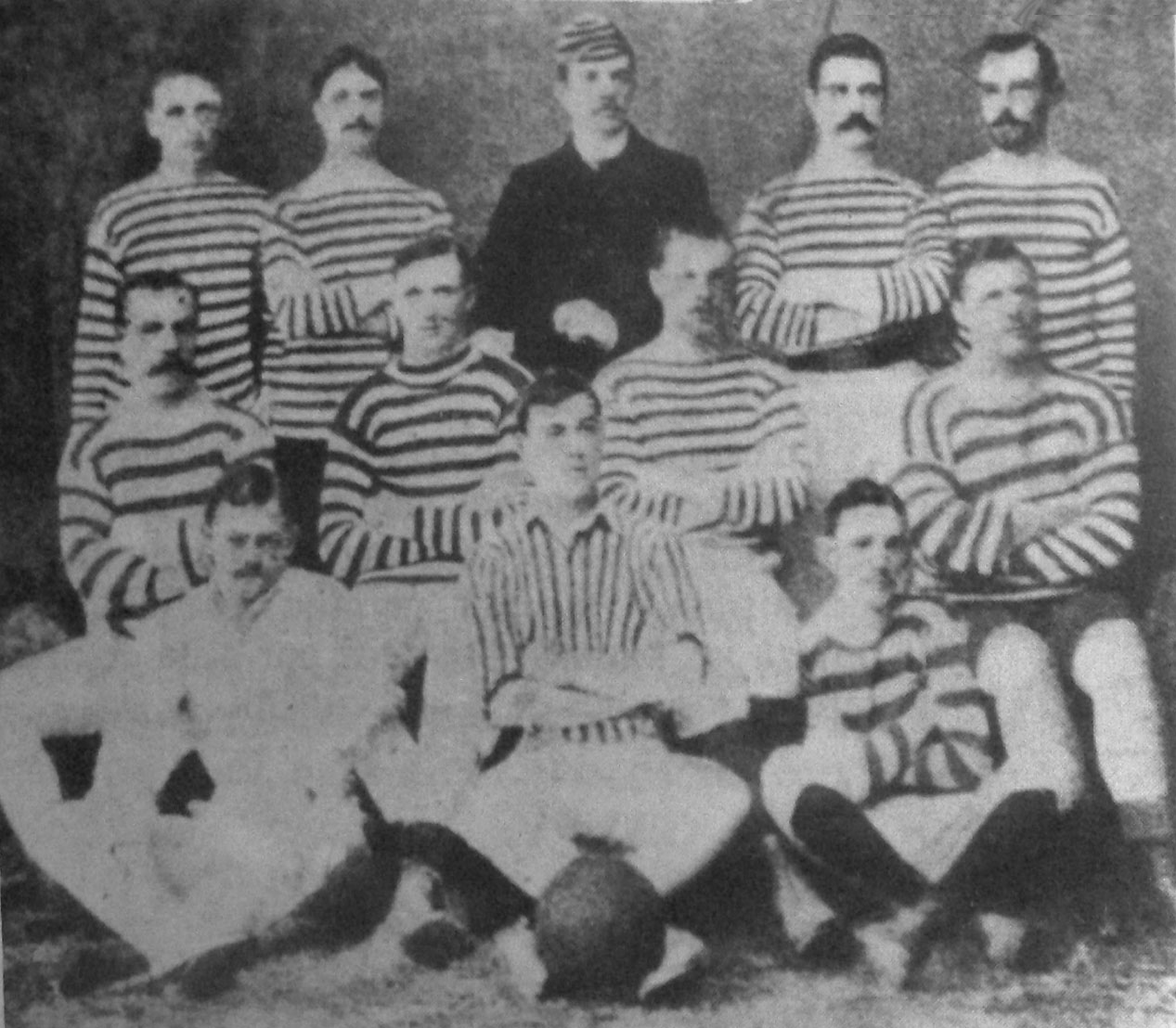
- St. Andrew's shared the title with Old Caledonians
- Season: 1891
- Dates: 12 April – 13 September
- Champions: St. Andrew's; Old Caledonians (1st title)
- Relegated: (none)
- Matches: 21
- Goals: 71 (3.38 per match)
- Top goalscorer: (England) Frederick Archer (Buenos Aires and Rosario Railway) (7 goals)
- Biggest home win: O. Caledonians 6–0 Belgrano F.C.
- Biggest away win: Buenos Aires F.C. 2–6 O. Caledonians

The 1891 Primera División was the first ever Argentine championship, making Argentina's the oldest football league outside the United Kingdom. This tournament was organized by the Argentine Association Football League whose president was F.L. Wooley. This league only lasted one season, so in 1892 no championship was held. In 1893 other Association with the same name would be established by Alexander Watson Hutton becoming current Argentine Football Association.

== Summary ==
The championship took the format of a league of 5 teams, with each team playing the other twice. Many of the results of individual games have been lost, hence the lack of goals for and against in the table below. Hurlingham registered in the tournament but did not take part of the same. The Hurlingham team was retired by the president of the club, John Ravenscroft, in solidarity with Alexander Watson Hutton (who had resigned as director of St. Andrew's School after they refused to include the practise of football, so Alex Lamont did not call him to be part of the league).

At the end of the season, St. Andrew's and Old Caledonians finished at the top position with 13 points each. They were declared joint champions, but played a playoff match to decide which team got to keep the medals, being St. Andrew's the winner.

The current Association has not included this title in their documents, except in its web page where only St. Andrew's is listed as champion.

== Final standings ==
Pos	Team	Pld	W	D	L	GF	GA	GD	Pts	Qualification
1	Old Caledonians	8	6	1	1	32	11	+21	13	Champion
2	St. Andrew's	8	6	1	1	23	12	+11	13	Champion
3	Buenos Aires and Rosario Railway	8	2	2	4	19	24	−5	6	
4	Buenos Aires F.C. (Note: This was not the club founded by the Hogg brothers but another football club that only participated in this championship. The team's jersey was red and white in vertical stripes while its venue was located in Flores, Buenos Aires. The team played its home games at Flores Old Ground.)	8	2	1	5	18	22	−4	5	
5	Belgrano F.C. (Note: Predecessor of current Belgrano Athletic Club. The team's field (referred as "Highfield" or "Prado General Belgrano" by newspapers from that time) was located on the block bounded by Cabildo, Olleros, 11 de Septiembre, and Gorostiaga streets. Apart from football, the facility hosted baseball, cricekt, and rugby matches. The land was sold soon after the season ended. In 1892, a textile factory ("Sternberg") would be built on that place.)	8	1	1	6	10	33	−23	3	
6	Hurlingham (Note: Hurlingham initially registered a team to participate but ultimately did not take part)	0	0	0	0	0	0	0	0	

=== Medal match ===
As the Association crowned both, St. Andrew's and Old Caledonians as champion, this match was held only to determine which team got to keep the medals.

1891 Argentine Primera División Playoff
13 September 1891

St. Andrew's	3–1 (a.e.t.)	Old Caledonians
Moffatt	Report	E. Wilson

Flores Old Ground
Referee: J. Wilson

== Matches ==
Home \ Away	OLD	STA	BARR	BAFC	BFC	HUR
Old Caledonians		0–4	4–1	2–1	6–0	
St. Andrew's	3–3		3–2	1–0	7–0	
Buenos Aires and Rosario Railway	0–4	4–0		3–5	4–4	
Buenos Aires F.C.	2–6	2–5	2–2		5–1	
Belgrano F.C.	0–7	1–2	2–3	2–1		
Hurlingham						

Legend: Blue = home team win; Yellow = draw; Red = away team win.
