= Alexander Watson Hutton =

Scottish teacher and sportsman

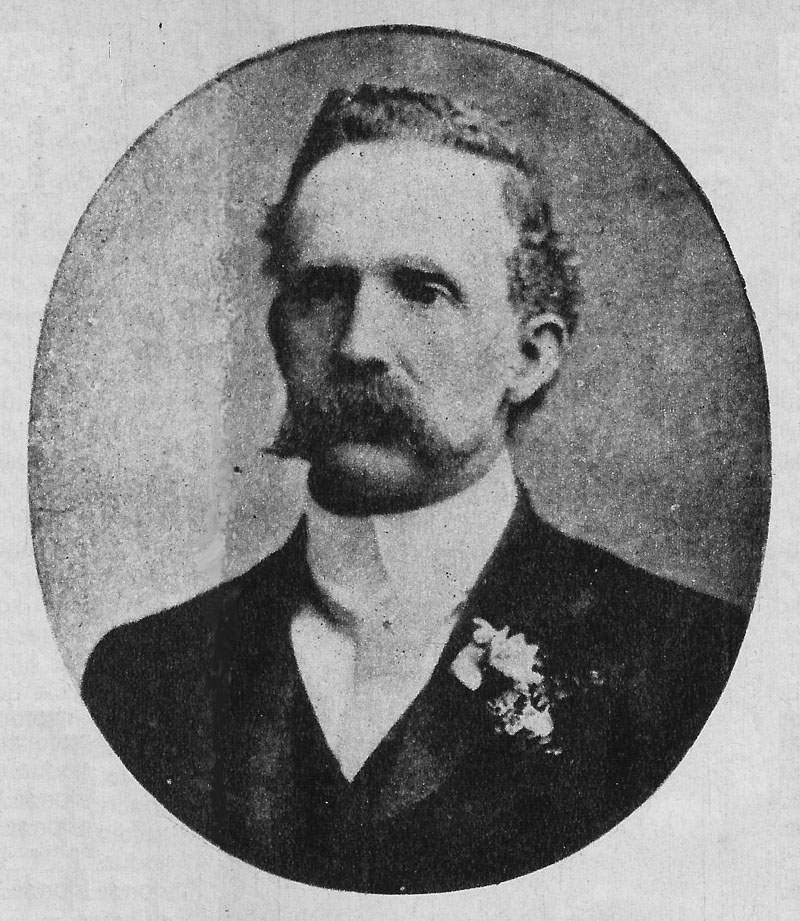
- Photo of Watson Hutton, c. 1880.
- Born: 10 June 1853; Glasgow, Scotland
- Died: 9 March 1936 (aged 82); Buenos Aires, Argentina
- Known for: Founder of: BAEHS (1884); AFA (1893); Alumni (1898)

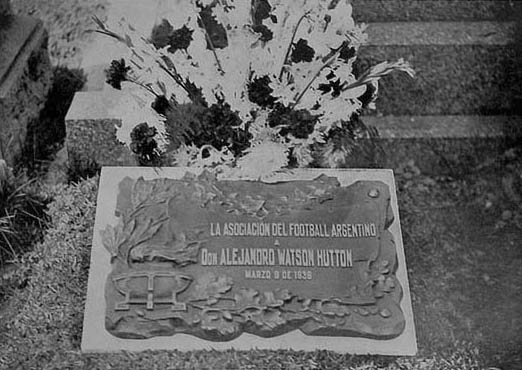
Watson Hutton graveyard at Cementerio Británico of Buenos Aires.

Alexander Watson Hutton (10 June 1853 – 9 March 1936) was a Scottish teacher and sportsman who is considered "The Father of Argentine football". In 1893 he founded the "Argentine Association Football League" (current Argentine Football Association). He also founded the Buenos Aires English High School and football club Alumni, which was the most successful Argentine team with 22 titles won until its dissolution in 1911.

== Biography ==
Watson Hutton was born in the Gorbals, in Glasgow, in 1853. He was educated at Daniel Stewart's School (now Stewart's Melville College) in Edinburgh and following this he graduated from Edinburgh University and emigrated to Argentina in 1882. He worked at St Andrew's Scots School for two years. He was a keen sportsman and believed that sports were of fundamental importance in education. On 4 February 1884 he founded the Buenos Aires English High School, where he continued to instruct the pupils in the game. In 1891 the Association Argentine Football League was established by Alex Lamont, headteacher of St. Andrew's Scots School, being the first football league outside of the British Isles. Five clubs competed but only one season was ever played. The title was won by a team of Scots from St Andrew's.

Although the five team league only lasted one season, it is officially recognised by the Argentine Association as the first football league in the country.

On 21 February 1893 Watson Hutton, along with representatives from Quilmes, Old Caledonian's, St. Andrew's, BA English High School, Lomas and Flores clubs, established the "Argentine Association Football League", and restarted the organization of tournaments after the 1892 hiatus. In 1898 his school formed a football team which went on to become the most decorated team of Argentine football by then, winning a total of 22 titles (15 domestic and 7 international championships) until its dissolution in 1911. The club, originally named the same as the school, changed to "Alumni Athletic Club" due to new rules by the Association. Alumni also provided many players for the Argentina national football team including his son Arnold Watson Hutton and captain Juan Brown.

In 1911 he retired and his club was disbanded. Watson Hutton died on 9 March 1936 in Buenos Aires and is buried in Cementerio Británico. The AFA library is named in his honour.

== See also ==
- Buenos Aires English High School
- Alumni Athletic Club
- Football in Argentina
