= List of Argentine Primera División champions =

The Argentina football champion is the winner of the highest league in Argentine football, the Primera División. The league season have had different formats, since the original double round-robin until the Liga Profesional. The champion is the team with the most points at the end of the competition.

The first Argentine football champions, St. Andrew's and Old Caledonians, were crowned in 1891 in the first official championship. Alumni was the most successful club with 10 titles until its dissolution in 1911. River Plate is the most successful club, having won 38 titles to date.

== Primera División champions (1891–present) ==
The following is a list including all the Primera División champions since the first edition held in 1891. For the first time since 1892, no league championship was held in 2020 after the schedule for a regular league season had been repeatedly delayed because of the COVID-19 pandemic. As the National Government allowed football competitions to return in October, AFA organised the 2020 Copa de la Liga Profesional, a domestic cup conceived as a contingency competition.

- (In bracket, title count):

Ed.	Season	Champion	Runner-up	Third Place
1	1891 (Note: Championship organised by The Argentine Association Football League, predecessor of current Argentine Football Association (established in 1893). That association was the oldest outside Great Britain, being dissolved that same year.)	St. Andrew's (1) (Note: The former and disbanded Association considered the title shared between both teams, in contrast to general opinion which held Saint Andrew's to be the champion because they won the final match, held to decide what team would be awarded with medals.)	Buenos Aires & Rosario Railway	Buenos Aires F.C. (Note: This was not the club founded by the Hogg brothers but another football club that only participated in this championship. The team's jersey was red and white in vertical stripes while its venue was located in Flores, Buenos Aires.)
1	1891	Old Caledonians (1)	Buenos Aires & Rosario Railway	Buenos Aires F.C.
–	1892	(No championship held after the dissolution of AAFL)		
2	1893 (Note: First championship organised by AFA.)	Lomas AC (1)	Flores	Quilmes
3	1894	Lomas AC (2)	Rosario AC	Flores
4	1895	Lomas AC (3)	Lomas Academy (Note: Separate team created by members of the Lomas A.C. in order to have another competitive squad from the institution.)	Flores
5	1896	Lomas Academy (1)	Flores	Lomas AC
6	1897	Lomas AC (4)	Lanús AC (Note: Not related to Club Atlético Lanús)	Belgrano AC
7	1898	Lomas AC (5)	Lobos	Belgrano AC
8	1899	Belgrano AC (1)	Lobos	Lomas AC
9	1900	Alumni (1) (Note: When Alumni won the 1900 title the club still named "English High School AC". In 1901 it was renamed due to the Football Association did not allow teams to use the same name as the school they represented to avoid advertising purposes.)	Lomas AC	Belgrano AC
10	1901	Alumni (2)	Belgrano AC	Quilmes
11	1902	Alumni (3)	Barracas AC	Quilmes
12	1903	Alumni (4)	Belgrano AC	Barracas AC
13	1904	Belgrano AC (2)	Alumni	Lomas AC
14	1905	Alumni (5)	Belgrano AC	Estudiantes (BA)
15	1906	Alumni (6)	Lomas AC	Quilmes
16	1907	Alumni (7)	Estudiantes (BA)	San Isidro
17	1908	Belgrano AC (3)	Alumni	Argentino (Q)
18	1909	Alumni (8)	River Plate	Quilmes
19	1910	Alumni (9)	Porteño	Belgrano AC
20	1911	Alumni (10)	Porteño	San Isidro
21	1912	Quilmes (1)	San Isidro	Racing
21	1912 FAF (Note: The Federación Argentina de Football (FAF) was a rival association that organized its own championships from 1912 to 1914.)	Porteño (1)	Independiente	Estudiantes (LP)
22	1913	Racing (1)	San Isidro	River Plate
22	1913 FAF	Estudiantes (LP) (1)	Gimnasia y Esgrima (BA)	Argentino (Q)
23	1914	Racing (2)	Estudiantes (BA)	Boca Juniors
23	1914 FAF	Porteño (2)	Estudiantes (LP)	Independiente
24	1915	Racing (3)	San Isidro	River Plate
25	1916	Racing (4)	Platense	River Plate
26	1917	Racing (5)	River Plate	Huracán
27	1918	Racing (6)	River Plate	Boca Juniors
28	1919	Boca Juniors (1)	Estudiantes (LP)	Huracán
28	1919 AAmF (Note: The Asociación Amateurs de Football (AAmF) was a rival association that organized its own championships from 1919 to 1926.)	Racing (7)	Vélez Sarsfield	River Plate
29	1920	Boca Juniors (2)	Banfield and Huracán	
29	1920 AAmF	River Plate (1)	Racing	San Lorenzo
30	1921	Huracán (1)	Del Plata	Boca Juniors
30	1921 AAmF	Racing (8)	River Plate	Independiente
31	1922	Huracán (2)	Sportivo Palermo	Boca Juniors
31	1922 AAmF	Independiente (1)	River Plate	San Lorenzo
32	1923	Boca Juniors (3)	Huracán	Sportivo Barracas
32	1923 AAmF	San Lorenzo (1)	Independiente	River Plate
33	1924	Boca Juniors (4)	Temperley	Dock Sud
33	1924 AAmF	San Lorenzo (2)	Gimnasia y Esgrima (LP)	Independiente
34	1925	Huracán (3)	Nueva Chicago	El Porvenir
34	1925 AAmF	Racing (9)	San Lorenzo	Almagro
35	1926	Boca Juniors (5)	Argentinos Juniors	Huracán
35	1926 AAmF	Independiente (2)	San Lorenzo	Platense
36	1927	San Lorenzo (3)	Boca Juniors	Lanús
37	1928	Huracán (4)	Boca Juniors	Estudiantes (LP)
38	1929	Gimnasia y Esgrima (LP) (1)	Boca Juniors	River Plate
39	1930	Boca Juniors (6)	Estudiantes (LP)	River Plate
40	1931	Estudiantil Porteño (1)	Almagro	Sportivo Buenos Aires
40	1931 LAF (Note: The Liga Argentina de Football (LAF) was a dissident association that organized the first four professional championships between 1931 and 1934. In 1935 it merged with the amateur association Asociación Argentina de Football (AAF) whose teams were relegated to second division.)	Boca Juniors (7)	San Lorenzo	Estudiantes (LP)
41	1932	Sportivo Barracas (1)	Barracas Central	Colegiales
41	1932 LAF	River Plate (2)	Independiente	Racing
42	1933	Dock Sud (1)	Nueva Chicago	Banfield
42	1933 LAF	San Lorenzo (4)	Boca Juniors	Racing
43	1934	Estudiantil Porteño (2)	Banfield	Defensores de Belgrano
43	1934 LAF	Boca Juniors (8)	Independiente	San Lorenzo
44	1935	Boca Juniors (9)	Independiente	San Lorenzo
45	1936 (H) (Note: The 1936 season was divided into two single round-robin tournaments, "Copa Campeonato" (won by River Plate) and "Copa de Honor" (won by San Lorenzo). At the end of the season, both teams played the "Copa de Oro", a single match won by River. In its Memoria y Balance (Annual Report) published by the AFA that year, River Plate is mentioned as "1936 Champion" while San Lorenzo is only mentioned as "Copa de honor winning team". In its 100th anniversary book published in 1993, the AFA listed River Plate as the only 1936 champion. In 2013, the AFA included three 1936 championships on its website, mentioning River Plate as Copa de Oro and Copa Campeonato winner and San Lorenzo as Copa de Honor winner, therefore both clubs were added one league title to their honours. Moreover, some historians consider Copa de Oro a national cup instead of a league championship, stating that it was only contested to qualify an Argentine representative to play the Copa Aldao against the Uruguayan champion.)	San Lorenzo (5)	Huracán	Boca Juniors
45	1936 (C)	River Plate (3)	San Lorenzo	Racing
45	1936 (O)	River Plate (4)	San Lorenzo	– (Note: No third team recorded so the championship was played in a two zones format, where both teams qualified first played a final.)
46	1937	River Plate (5)	Independiente	Boca Juniors
47	1938	Independiente (3)	River Plate	San Lorenzo
48	1939	Independiente (4)	River Plate and Huracán	
49	1940	Boca Juniors (10)	Independiente	River Plate
50	1941	River Plate (6)	San Lorenzo	Newell's Old Boys
51	1942	River Plate (7)	San Lorenzo	Huracán
52	1943	Boca Juniors (11)	River Plate	San Lorenzo
53	1944	Boca Juniors (12)	River Plate	Estudiantes (LP)
54	1945	River Plate (8)	Boca Juniors	Independiente
55	1946	San Lorenzo (6)	Boca Juniors	River Plate
56	1947	River Plate (9)	Boca Juniors	Independiente
57	1948	Independiente (5)	River Plate	Estudiantes (LP)
58	1949	Racing (10)	River Plate	Platense
59	1950	Racing (11)	Boca Juniors	Independiente
60	1951	Racing (12)	Banfield	River Plate
61	1952	River Plate (10)	Racing	Independiente
62	1953	River Plate (11)	Vélez Sarsfield	Racing
63	1954	Boca Juniors (13)	Independiente	River Plate
64	1955	River Plate (12)	Racing	Boca Juniors
65	1956	River Plate (13)	Lanús	Boca Juniors
66	1957	River Plate (14)	San Lorenzo	Racing
67	1958	Racing (13)	Boca Juniors	San Lorenzo
68	1959	San Lorenzo (7)	Racing	Independiente
69	1960	Independiente (6)	River Plate	Argentinos Juniors
70	1961	Racing (14)	San Lorenzo	River Plate
71	1962	Boca Juniors (14)	River Plate	Gimnasia y Esgrima (LP)
72	1963	Independiente (7)	River Plate	Racing
73	1964	Boca Juniors (15)	Independiente	River Plate
74	1965	Boca Juniors (16)	River Plate	Vélez Sarsfield
75	1966	Racing (15)	River Plate	Boca Juniors
76	1967 Metropolitano	Estudiantes (LP) (2)	Racing	–
76	1967 Nacional	Independiente (8)	Estudiantes (LP)	Vélez Sarsfield
77	1968 Metropolitano	San Lorenzo (8)	Estudiantes (LP)	–
77	1968 Nacional	Vélez Sarsfield (1)	River Plate	Racing
78	1969 Metropolitano	Chacarita Juniors (1)	River Plate	–
78	1969 Nacional	Boca Juniors (17)	River Plate	San Lorenzo
79	1970 Metropolitano	Independiente (9)	River Plate	San Lorenzo
79	1970 Nacional	Boca Juniors (18)	Rosario Central	–
80	1971 Metropolitano	Independiente (10)	Vélez Sarsfield	Chacarita Juniors
80	1971 Nacional	Rosario Central (1)	San Lorenzo	–
81	1972 Metropolitano	San Lorenzo (9)	Racing	Huracán
81	1972 Nacional	San Lorenzo (10)	River Plate	Boca Juniors
82	1973 Metropolitano	Huracán (5)	Boca Juniors	San Lorenzo
82	1973 Nacional	Rosario Central (2)	River Plate	Atlanta
83	1974 Metropolitano	Newell's Old Boys (1)	Rosario Central	Boca Juniors
83	1974 Nacional	San Lorenzo (11)	Rosario Central	Vélez Sarsfield
84	1975 Metropolitano	River Plate (15)	Huracán	Boca Juniors
84	1975 Nacional	River Plate (16)	Estudiantes (LP)	San Lorenzo
85	1976 Metropolitano	Boca Juniors (19)	Huracán	Estudiantes (LP)
85	1976 Nacional	Boca Juniors (20)	River Plate	–
86	1977 Metropolitano	River Plate (17)	Independiente	Vélez Sarsfield
86	1977 Nacional	Independiente (11)	Talleres (C)	–
87	1978 Metropolitano	Quilmes (2)	Boca Juniors	Unión
87	1978 Nacional	Independiente (12)	River Plate	–
88	1979 Metropolitano	River Plate (18)	Vélez Sarsfield	–
88	1979 Nacional	River Plate (19)	Unión	–
89	1980 Metropolitano	River Plate (20)	Argentinos Juniors	Talleres (C)
89	1980 Nacional	Rosario Central (3)	Racing (C)	–
90	1981 Metropolitano	Boca Juniors (21)	Ferro Carril Oeste	Newell's Old Boys
90	1981 Nacional	River Plate (21)	Ferro Carril Oeste	–
91	1982 Metropolitano	Estudiantes (LP) (3)	Independiente	Boca Juniors
91	1982 Nacional	Ferro Carril Oeste (1)	Quilmes	–
92	1983 Metropolitano	Independiente (13)	San Lorenzo	Ferro Carril Oeste
92	1983 Nacional	Estudiantes (LP) (4)	Independiente	–
93	1984 Metropolitano	Argentinos Juniors (1)	Ferro Carril Oeste	Estudiantes (LP)
93	1984 Nacional	Ferro Carril Oeste (2)	River Plate	–
94	1985 Nacional	Argentinos Juniors (2)	Vélez Sarsfield	–
95	1985–86	River Plate (22)	Newell's Old Boys	Deportivo Español
96	1986–87	Rosario Central (4)	Newell's Old Boys	Independiente
97	1987–88	Newell's Old Boys (2)	San Lorenzo	Racing
98	1988–89	Independiente (14)	Boca Juniors	Deportivo Español
99	1989–90	River Plate (23)	Independiente	Boca Juniors
100	1990–91 (Note: Although there was an Apertura (Newell's Old Boys) and Clausura champion (Boca Juniors) this season, the half-year champions played in a two-legged final to determine the season champion, which finally was Newell's.)	Newell's Old Boys (3)	Boca Juniors	River Plate
101	1991 Apertura (Note: Since 1991–92 season both Apertura and Clausura were official titles as individuals.)	River Plate (24)	Boca Juniors	San Lorenzo
101	1992 Clausura	Newell's Old Boys (4)	Vélez Sarsfield	Deportivo Español
102	1992 Apertura	Boca Juniors (22)	River Plate	San Lorenzo
102	1993 Clausura	Vélez Sarsfield (2)	Independiente	River Plate
103	1993 Apertura	River Plate (25)	Vélez Sarsfield	Racing
103	1994 Clausura	Independiente (15)	Huracán	Rosario Central
104	1994 Apertura	River Plate (26)	San Lorenzo	Vélez Sarsfield
104	1995 Clausura	San Lorenzo (12)	Gimnasia y Esgrima (LP)	Vélez Sarsfield
105	1995 Apertura	Vélez Sarsfield (3)	Racing	Lanús
105	1996 Clausura	Vélez Sarsfield (4)	Gimnasia y Esgrima (LP)	Lanús
106	1996 Apertura	River Plate (27)	Independiente	Lanús
106	1997 Clausura	River Plate (28)	Colón	Newell's Old Boys
107	1997 Apertura	River Plate (29)	Boca Juniors	Rosario Central
107	1998 Clausura	Vélez Sarsfield (5)	Lanús	Gimnasia y Esgrima (LP)
108	1998 Apertura	Boca Juniors (23)	Gimnasia y Esgrima (LP)	Racing
108	1999 Clausura	Boca Juniors (24)	River Plate	San Lorenzo
109	1999 Apertura	River Plate (30)	Rosario Central	Boca Juniors
109	2000 Clausura	River Plate (31)	Independiente	Colón
110	2000 Apertura	Boca Juniors (25)	River Plate	Gimnasia y Esgrima (LP)
110	2001 Clausura	San Lorenzo (13)	River Plate	Boca Juniors
111	2001 Apertura	Racing (16)	River Plate	Boca Juniors
111	2002 Clausura	River Plate (32)	Gimnasia y Esgrima (LP)	Boca Juniors
112	2002 Apertura	Independiente (16)	Boca Juniors	River Plate
112	2003 Clausura	River Plate (33)	Boca Juniors	Vélez Sarsfield
113	2003 Apertura	Boca Juniors (26)	San Lorenzo	Banfield
113	2004 Clausura	River Plate (34)	Boca Juniors	Talleres (C)
114	2004 Apertura	Newell's Old Boys (5)	Vélez Sarsfield	River Plate
114	2005 Clausura	Vélez Sarsfield (6)	Banfield	Racing
115	2005 Apertura	Boca Juniors (27)	Gimnasia y Esgrima (LP)	Vélez Sarsfield
115	2006 Clausura	Boca Juniors (28)	Lanús	River Plate
116	2006 Apertura	Estudiantes (LP) (5)	Boca Juniors	River Plate
116	2007 Clausura	San Lorenzo (14)	Boca Juniors	Estudiantes (LP)
117	2007 Apertura	Lanús (1)	Tigre	Banfield
117	2008 Clausura	River Plate (35)	Boca Juniors	Estudiantes (LP)
118	2008 Apertura	Boca Juniors (29)	Tigre	San Lorenzo
118	2009 Clausura	Vélez Sarsfield (7)	Huracán	Lanús
119	2009 Apertura	Banfield (1)	Newell's Old Boys	Colón
119	2010 Clausura	Argentinos Juniors (3)	Estudiantes (LP)	Godoy Cruz
120	2010 Apertura	Estudiantes (LP) (6)	Vélez Sarsfield	Arsenal
120	2011 Clausura	Vélez Sarsfield (8)	Lanús	Godoy Cruz
121	2011 Apertura	Boca Juniors (30)	Racing	Vélez Sarsfield
121	2012 Clausura	Arsenal (1)	Tigre	Vélez Sarsfield
122	2012 Inicial	Vélez Sarsfield (9)	Newell's Old Boys	Belgrano
122	2013 Final	Newell's Old Boys (6)	River Plate	Lanús
122	2012–13 (Note: Only to indicate that Vélez Sársfield was proclaimed as champion of the entire season after winning the "Superfinal" v Newell's.)	Vélez Sarsfield (10) (Note: Vélez was recognized as the champion of the entire season (2013-14) and awarded its 10th. Primera División title.)	Newell's Old Boys	–
123	2013 Inicial	San Lorenzo (15)	Lanús	Vélez Sarsfield
123	2014 Final	River Plate (36) (Note: Although River defeated San Lorenzo in the "Superfinal", this did not count as a new Primera División honour.)	Boca Juniors	Estudiantes (LP)
124	2014 Transición	Racing (17)	River Plate	Lanús
125	2015	Boca Juniors (31)	San Lorenzo	Rosario Central
126	2016	Lanús (2)	San Lorenzo	Estudiantes (LP)
127	2016–17	Boca Juniors (32)	River Plate	Estudiantes (LP)
128	2017–18	Boca Juniors (33)	Godoy Cruz	San Lorenzo
129	2018–19	Racing (18)	Defensa y Justicia	Boca Juniors
130	2019–20	Boca Juniors (34)	River Plate	Vélez Sarsfield
–	2020	(not held because of COVID-19 pandemic in Argentina)		
131	2021	River Plate (37)	Defensa y Justicia	Talleres (C)
132	2022	Boca Juniors (35)	Racing	River Plate
133	2023	River Plate (38)	Talleres (C)	San Lorenzo
134	2024	Vélez Sarsfield (11)	Talleres (C)	Racing
135	2025 Apertura	Platense (1)	Huracán	–
135	2025 Clausura	Estudiantes (LP) (7)	Racing	–
135	2025 Liga	Rosario Central (5) (Note: The AFA awarded Rosario Central a league title due to having earned the most points in the entire season (2025 aggregate table). The decision to award the “Campeón de Liga” title to Rosario Central caused wide controversy as the trophy was not announced before the end of the Clausura regular season. As the 2025 Tournament Rules stated that changes could be made (prior approval by the Executive Committee) with the season in progress president Claudio Tapia presented an initiative to award a league title to Rosario Central, which was approved and carried out by the committee in November. The title was established with retroactivity since this 2025 season and will also be disputed in the future seasons.)	Boca Juniors	Argentinos Juniors
136	2026 Apertura	Belgrano (1)	River Plate	–
136	2026 Clausura			–
136	2026 Liga	Boca Juniors (36)	Rosario Central	Argentinos Juniors

Keys

- H = Copa de Honor
- C = Copa Campeonato
- O = Copa de Oro
- Met = Metropolitano (1967–1984)
- Nac = Nacional (1967–1985)
- Ap = Apertura (1991–2012)
- Cl = Clausura (1991–2012)
- In = Inicial (2012–2014)
- Fi = Final (2012–2014)
- Tr = Transition (2014)

== Titles by club ==
The list include all the titles won by each club since the first Primera División championship held in 1891. Clubs in italic no longer exist or are currently disaffiliated from the AFA.

Rank	Club	Titles	Runners-up	Winning years	Runners-up years
1	River Plate	38	35	1920 AAmF, 1932 LAF, 1936 (Copa Campeonato), 1936 (Copa de Oro), (Note: The Association awarded River Plate both titles, Copa Campeonato and Copa de Oro, as individual titles.) 1937, 1941, 1942, 1945, 1947, 1952, 1953, 1955, 1956, 1957, 1975 Metropolitano, 1975 Nacional, 1977 Metropolitano, 1979 Metropolitano, 1979 Nacional, 1980 Metropolitano, 1981 Nacional, 1985–86, 1989–90, 1991 Apertura, 1993 Apertura, 1994 Apertura, 1996 Apertura, 1997 Apertura, 1997 Clausura, 1999 Apertura, 2000 Clausura, 2002 Clausura, 2003 Clausura, 2004 Clausura, 2008 Clausura, 2014 Final, 2021, 2023	1909, 1917, 1918, 1921 AAmF, 1922 AAmF, 1938, 1939, 1943, 1944, 1948, 1949, 1960, 1962, 1963, 1965, 1966, 1968 Nacional, 1969 Metropolitano, 1969 Nacional, 1970 Metropolitano, 1972 Nacional, 1973 Nacional, 1976 Nacional, 1978 Nacional, 1984 Nacional, 1992 Apertura, 1999 Clausura, 2000 Apertura, 2001 Clausura, 2001 Apertura, 2013 Final, 2014 Transición, 2016–17, 2019–20, 2026 Apertura
2	Boca Juniors	36	23	1919, 1920, 1923, 1924, 1926, 1930, 1931 LAF, 1934 LAF, 1935, 1940, 1943, 1944, 1954, 1962, 1964, 1965, 1969 Nacional, 1970 Nacional, 1976 Metropolitano, 1976 Nacional, 1981 Metropolitano, 1992 Apertura, 1998 Apertura, 1999 Clausura, 2000 Apertura, 2003 Apertura, 2005 Apertura, 2006 Clausura, 2008 Apertura, 2011 Apertura, 2015, 2016–17, 2017–18, 2019–20, 2022, 2026 Liga	1927, 1928, 1929, 1933 LAF, 1945, 1946, 1947, 1950, 1958, 1973 Metropolitano, 1978 Metropolitano, 1988–89, 1990–91, 1991 Apertura, 1997 Apertura, 2002 Apertura, 2003 Clausura, 2004 Clausura, 2006 Apertura, 2007 Clausura, 2008 Clausura, 2014 Final, 2025 Liga
3	Racing	18	10	1913, 1914, 1915, 1916, 1917, 1918, 1919 AAmF, 1921 AAmF, 1925 AAmF, 1949, 1950, 1951, 1958, 1961, 1966, 2001 Apertura, 2014 Transición, 2018–19	1920 AAmF, 1952, 1955, 1959, 1967 Metropolitano, 1972 Metropolitano, 1995 Apertura, 2011 Apertura, 2022, 2025 Clausura
4	Independiente	16	16	1922 AAmF, 1926 AAmF, 1938, 1939, 1948, 1960, 1963, 1967 Nacional, 1970 Metropolitano, 1971 Metropolitano, 1977 Nacional, 1978 Nacional, 1983 Metropolitano, 1988–1989, 1994 Clausura, 2002 Apertura	1912 FAF, 1923 AAmF, 1932 LAF, 1934 LAF, 1935, 1937, 1940, 1954, 1964, 1977 Metropolitano, 1982 Metropolitano, 1983 Nacional, 1989–90, 1993 Clausura, 1996 Apertura, 2000 Clausura
5	San Lorenzo	15	16	1923 AAmF, 1924 AAmF, 1927, 1933 LAF, 1936 (Copa de Honor), 1946, 1959, 1968 Metropolitano, 1972 Metropolitano, 1972 Nacional, 1974 Nacional, 1995 Clausura, 2001 Clausura, 2007 Clausura, 2013 Inicial	1925 AAmF, 1926 AAmF, 1931 LAF, 1936 (C), 1936 (O), 1941, 1942, 1957, 1961, 1971 Nacional, 1983 Metropolitano, 1987–88, 1994 Apertura, 2003 Apertura, 2015, 2016
6	Vélez Sarsfield	11	9	1968 Nacional, 1993 Clausura, 1995 Apertura, 1996 Clausura, 1998 Clausura, 2005 Clausura, 2009 Clausura, 2011 Clausura, 2012 Inicial, 2012–13 Superfinal (Note: The Argentine Football Association considered the Superfinal as an official Primera División championship (2012-13 season) so Vélez Sarsfield awarded its 10th. title.), 2024	1919 AAmF, 1953, 1971 Metropolitano, 1979 Metropolitano, 1985 Nacional, 1992 Clausura, 1993 Apertura, 2004 Apertura, 2010 Apertura
7	Alumni	10	2	1900, (Note: Under the name "English High School AC") 1901, 1902, 1903, 1905, 1906, 1907, 1909, 1910, 1911	1904, 1908
8	Estudiantes (LP)	7	7	1913 FAF, 1967 Metropolitano, 1982 Metropolitano, 1983 Nacional, 2006 Apertura, 2010 Apertura, 2025 Clausura	1914 FAF, 1919, 1930, 1967 Nacional, 1968 Metropolitano, 1975 Nacional, 2010 Clausura
9	Newell's Old Boys	6	5	1974 Metropolitano, 1987–88, 1990–91, 1992 Clausura, 2004 Apertura, 2013 Final	1985–86, 1986–87, 2009 Apertura, 2012 Inicial, 2012–13,
10	Huracán	5	9	1921, 1922, 1925, 1928, 1973 Metropolitano	1920, 1923, 1936 (H), 1939, 1975 Metropolitano, 1976 Metropolitano, 1994 Clausura, 2009 Clausura, 2025 Apertura
10	Rosario Central	5	5	1971 Nacional, 1973 Nacional, 1980 Nacional, 1986–87, 2025 Liga	1970 Nacional, 1974 Metropolitano, 1974 Nacional, 1999 Apertura, 2026 Liga
10	Lomas Athletic	5	2	1893, 1894, 1895, 1897, 1898	1900, 1906
13	Belgrano Athletic	3	3	1899, 1904, 1908	1901, 1903, 1905
13	Argentinos Juniors	3	2	1984 Metropolitano, 1985 Nacional, 2010 Clausura	1926, 1980 Metropolitano
15	Lanús	2	5	2007 Apertura, 2016	1956, 1998 Clausura, 2006 Clausura, 2011 Clausura, 2013 Inicial
15	Ferro Carril Oeste	2	3	1982 Nacional, 1984 Nacional	1981 Metropolitano, 1981 Nacional, 1984 Metropolitano
15	Porteño	2	2	1912 FAF, 1914 FAF	1910, 1911
15	Quilmes	2	1	1912, 1978 Metropolitano	1982 Nacional
15	Estudiantil Porteño	2	—	1931, 1934	—
20	Gimnasia y Esgrima (LP)	1	6	1929	1924 AAmF, 1995 Clausura, 1996 Clausura, 1998 Apertura, 2002 Clausura, 2005 Apertura
20	Banfield	1	4	2009 Apertura	1920, 1951, 2003 Apertura, 2005 Clausura
20	Lomas Academy	1	1	1896	1895
20	Platense	1	1	2025 Apertura	1916
20	Arsenal	1	—	2012 Clausura	—
20	Belgrano	1	—	2026 Apertura	
20	Chacarita Juniors	1	—	1969 Metropolitano	—
20	Dock Sud	1	—	1933	—
20	Old Caledonians	1	—	1891	—
20	Sportivo Barracas	1	—	1932	—
20	St. Andrew's	1	—	1891	—

== Championships defined by tiebreaker matches ==
Although most of Primera División championships were decided by points in single and double round-robin tournaments, some tiebreaker matches were played when two (or more) teams ended tied on points at the end of the season in order to define a champion. The following is a list of those cases:

Notes:

1. The 1936 "Copa de Oro" is not listed because it did not define a Primera División champion but which team would participate in the 1936 Copa Aldao. (Note: This point is still under discussion and has caused controversies among football historians, as River Plate was mentioned as "Argentine champion" on the AFA Annual Report of that year. Nevertheless, some historians argue that the "Copa de Oro" was not a league title but a national cup that determined which team would play the Copa Aldao v the Uruguayan representative.)
2. Nacional championship finals are listed on their respective articles and not included here. It is due to finals included in the list below were played in exceptional cases (mostly when both teams finished tied on points).
3. Copa Campeonato matches are not included because they had the format of national cup.
Titles won by club (%)
1. River Plate - 38 (19.6%)
2. Boca Juniors - 35 (18.0%)
3. Racing – 18 (9.30%)
4. Independiente – 16 (8.20%)
5. San Lorenzo – 15 (7.70%)
6. Vélez Sarsfield – 11 (5.70%)
7. Alumni – 10 (5.20%)
8. Estudiantes (LP) - 6 (3.10%)
9. Newell's Old Boys - 6 (3.10%)
10. Huracán - 5 (2.60%)
11. Lomas Athletic - 5 (2.60%)
12. Rosario Central - 5 (2.60%)
13. Belgrano Athletic - 3 (1.60%)
14. Argentino Juniors - 3 (1.60%)
15. Other Teams - 19 (9.70%)

Season	Winner	Score/s	Runner-up	Venue/s
1891 (Note: This match did not decide the champion so both teams had been awarded the title after they finished tied on points. The match was held only to define which team would be awarded the medals.)	St. Andrew's	3–1 (a.e.t.)	Old Caledonians	Flores
1897	Lomas	1–1, 0–0, 1–0	Lanús A.C.	Lomas Field
1911	Alumni	2–1	Porteño	GEBA
1912 FAF	Porteño	1–1 (Note: Porteño was croned champion after Independiente left the field in protest.)	Independiente	GEBA
1913	Racing	2–0	San Isidro	Racing
1915	Racing	1–0	San Isidro	Independiente
1923	Boca Juniors	3–0, 0–2, 0–0, 2–0 (Note: Only the last match is included so both clubs had played three games before (in a two legged series, one win for each, then a playoff that drew after extra time))	Huracán	Sportivo Barracas, GEBA
1925	Huracán	1–1 (Note: The association crowned Huracán as champion after players of Nueva Chicago refused to play the extra time.)	Nueva Chicago	Sportivo Barracas
1932 LAF	River Plate	3–0	Independiente	San Lorenzo
1951	Racing	0–0, 1–0 (Note: Played in a two-legged tie)	Banfield	San Lorenzo (Note: Both finals played in the same venue.)
1990–91	Newell's Old Boys	1–0, 0–1 (4–3 p) (Note: Played in a two-legged tie, Newell's won by penalty shoot-out after both teams won a match each and tied 1–1 on aggregate.)	Boca Juniors	Rosario Central, Boca Juniors
2006 Apertura	Estudiantes (LP)	2–1	Boca Juniors	Vélez Sarsfield
2008 Ap	Boca Juniors (Note: Boca Juniors, San Lorenzo, and Tigre equalled on points so the three clubs played each other in a single round-robin tie breaker. Boca Juniors won the championship by goal difference.)	3–1	San Lorenzo	Racing
2008 Ap	Boca Juniors	0–1	Tigre	Racing

== See also ==
- List of Argentine football national cups
