= Argentine Primera División records and statistics =

This is a list of major records of the Argentine Primera División, the top level of the Argentine football league system. The first season was held in 1891.

There have also been a number of changes in the competition format:

1. Between 1891 and 1966 it was played during one year in a double round-robin tournament.
2. Between 1967 and 1985 there were two championships per year (Metropolitano and Nacional).
3. Between 1985 and 1991 it was contested via round-robin again, but with the European style calendar (season started in mid year).
4. Between 1991 and 2012, it was contested with an Apertura and Clausura format, meaning there are two champions per season.
5. Between 2012 and 2014, it was contested with a format similar to this last, with two champions per season. The championships were named Inicial, which replaced the Apertura; and Final, which replaced the Clausura.
6. Between 2015 and 2024, the tournament was mostly contested via a single round-robin following the annual calendar (2015), the European style calendar (2016-2020) and as a half-season tournament (2021-2024). For the 2016 tournament, teams were split into two groups and the championship was contested by the top team in each group.
7. Since 2025, it is again contested with an Apertura and Clausura format, but with teams split into two groups, with a final playoff round between the top eight teams in each group. There are three champions per season: in addition to the Apertura and Clausura championships, the top-ranked team in the yearly table is awarded the “League Championship” title.

== Teams ==
=== Titles ===
- River Plate is the most successful team in Argentine domestic football, having won the league title 38 times.
- Boca Juniors is the only team that have won at least one title in every decade.
- River Plate and Racing Club are the only clubs ever to win three back-to-back championships. Racing achieved the feat in 1949, 1950 and 1951, while River Plate have achieved the feat 3 times: 1955, 1956 and 1957; 1979 Metro, 1979 Nacional and 1980 Metro; and 1996 Apertura, 1997 Clausura and 1997 Apertura.

==== Runners-up ====
- River Plate is the only four-time consecutive runner up, from the 1968 Nacional to the 1970 Metropolitano.

=== Runs ===
- Boca Juniors set the record for the longest unbeaten run. They went 40 games without losing, starting during the 1998 Clausura and extended through the 1998 Apertura and the 1999 Clausura. The team was first coached by Miguel Ángel García Cambón, and then by Carlos Bianchi through most of the period.
- Banfield holds the record for the longest unbeaten run in home games. They did not lose in their own stadium for 49 matches between 1950 and 1953.
- San Lorenzo holds the record for the longest winning streak. They amassed 13 consecutive victories between the 2001 Clausura and the 2001 Apertura.
- River Plate holds the record for the longest winning streak playing away from home. They won 11 consecutive matches on the road between 1937 and 1938.
- Ferro Carril Oeste holds the record for the longest clean sheet. In 1981, they didn't concede a goal for 1075 minutes. This included a run of ten complete games without conceding a goal. Their goalkeeper was Carlos Barisio.
- Racing Club holds the record for the longest sequence of tied matches. They drew ten league games in a row between 20 April and 14 October 1990.

=== In one championship ===
- Independiente holds the record for the most goals in one season. They scored 115 in 1938.
- Racing Club won the championship with the most points during the first year-long form of dispute (1931–1966), with 61 points in 1966.
- River Plate won the championship with the most points in a Nacional, with 63 points in 1977.
- Four teams have won the championship without losing a game: San Lorenzo achieved it twice, (in the 1968 Metropolitano and the 1972 Nacional), Ferro Carril Oeste once (1982 Nacional), River Plate once (1994 Apertura) and Boca Juniors twice (1998 Apertura) and the (2011 Apertura). Estudiantes de La Plata is the only team that was runner-up unbeaten, in the 1967 Nacional.

==== Short tournaments ====
This section accounts for records of the Apertura and Clausura era (1991–present).

- San Lorenzo won the championship with the most points, with 47 in the 2001 Clausura.
- River Plate won the division with the fewest points, with 24 in the 1993 Apertura (10 points above the last placed team).
- Boca Juniors is the team who has spent most fixtures in the first position, without winning the championship. They were first throughout all the 2006 Apertura (all 19 games), but lost to Estudiantes de La Plata on a tiebreaker final.

=== Promotion and relegation ===
- Boca Juniors is the only team that has never competed in the second division having played in the first division, playing all seasons in the Primera since 1913.
- Quilmes is the team with most promotions to and relegations from the first division, a total of eight for each.
- Rosario Central is the only team that have won a championship in the season following their promotion to the Primera. They did so in 1986–87.
- Talleres de Córdoba were probably the best team ever to suffer relegation. They finished third in the 2004 Clausura, but were relegated by the points aggregate system, which relegates the teams with the worst points averages over the last three seasons.
- San Martín de Tucumán is the only club that reached the Primera División from the lowest possible category (the Liga Tucumana de Fútbol), then was relegated all the way back to that category and from there reached the Argentine top division again.

=== Negative ===
- The worst campaign by a team was in 1939, when Argentino de Quilmes finished with 4 points in 34 matches, without a single victory.
- Argentinos Juniors holds the record of most consecutive games lost, with 14 between 26 April 1936 and 26 July of that year.
- Ferro Carril Oeste set the record for the longest run without scoring. They amassed 875 minutes without a goal between the 1998 Apertura and the 1999 Clausura. The team's supporters displayed a tifo with a simple message: "SCORE 1 GOAL" (in Spanish: "HAGAN 1 GOL").
- Platense set the record for the most number of managers in one season. They had 8 different managers in the 1966 championship.
- Atlanta set the record for the most players in a season. They used 62 different players in 1932.

=== Most seasons ===
The following list shows the number of seasons in the First Division only of the first 10 teams.

As of 2 April 2022

Rank	Club	Seas.	First
1	River Plate	114	1909
2	Boca Juniors	111	1913
2	Independiente	111	1912
3	Racing	110	1911
3	Estudiantes (LP)	110	1912
4	San Lorenzo	108	1915
5	Vélez Sarsfield	102	1919
6	Gimnasia y Esgrima (LP)	97	1916
6	Huracán	97	1914
7	Newell's Old Boys	82	1939
8	Ferro Carril Oeste	81	1913
8	Lanús	81	1920
9	Argentinos Juniors	79	1922
10	Rosario Central	78	1939

== Players ==
=== Scorers ===
- Paraguayan striker Arsenio Erico (Independiente) and Ángel Labruna (River Plate) are the league's all-time top scorers, with 293 goals. (See also: List of top association football goal scorers by country#Argentina).
- Bernabé Ferreyra is the scorer with the highest goal average: 206 goals in 197 matches, averaging 1.04 goals per match.
- Héctor Scotta scored the highest number of goals in a single calendar year (60 goals for San Lorenzo in 1975: 32 in the Metro and a further 28 in the Nacional).
- Arsenio Erico scored the highest number of goals in a long tournament (1931–1966, and 1985–1991). He scored 47 goals in 34 games in 1937 for Independiente. He also has the highest goal average in one tournament, with 1.38.
- Martín Palermo is the highest scorer in one short tournament (1991–present). He scored 20 goals in 19 games during the 1998 Apertura for Boca Juniors.
- Diego Maradona was top scorer in five tournaments (1978 Metro, 1979 Metro, 1979 Nacional, 1980 Metro and 1980 Nacional), all of them with Argentinos Juniors. He is followed by Luis Artime and José Sanfilippo, who were top scorers four times.
- José Sanfilippo is the only player who has been top scorer in four consecutive tournaments, all of them playing for San Lorenzo: 1958, 1959, 1960 and 1961.
- Juan Taverna holds the record of most goals in one game. He scored 7 for Banfield in the team's 13–1 victory over Puerto Comercial in the 1974 Nacional.
- Daniel Passarella is the league's top scoring defender, with 99 goals in 238 matches.
- Victorio Spinetto is the only defender to score four goals in one game. He did so on 17 October 1937, for Vélez Sársfield in the team's 5–2 victory over Chacarita Juniors.
- Carlos Seppaquercia scored the fastest goal ever in the division, against Huracán for Gimnasia y Esgrima La Plata. He scored after only five seconds, on 20 March 1979.
- Eduardo Maglioni scored three goals in just 1 minute and 51 seconds, playing for Independiente against Gimnasia y Esgrima La Plata on 18 March 1973. This feat gave him the world record for the fastest ever hat-trick.

=== Goalkeepers ===
- Paraguayan José Luis Chilavert is the league's top scoring goalkeeper with 36 goals playing for Vélez Sársfield.
- José Luis Chilavert is also the goalkeeper with most goals in one game, scoring three in Vélez Sársfield's 6–1 victory over Ferro Carril Oeste in the 1999 Apertura.
- The first ever goalkeeper to score in top flight Argentine football was Eduardo Alterio. He scored a penalty against Tigre for Chacarita Juniors in 1931.
- Carlos Bossio scored for Estudiantes de La Plata the first goal by a goalkeeper via header. It was in a 1–1 draw with Racing in the 1996 Clausura.
- José Luis Chilavert was the first goalkeeper to score from a free kick. He did so in Vélez Sársfield's 1–0 victory over Deportivo Español on 2 October 1994.
- Hugo Gatti and Ubaldo Fillol share the record of most penalty kicks saved, with 26 each.

=== Precocious ===
- Sergio Agüero became the youngest player ever to appear in the Primera, taking the record previously held by Diego Maradona. On 7 July 2003 he appeared for Independiente at the age of 15 years and 35 days.
- Diego Maradona is the youngest ever top scorer in the Argentine topflight. He was only 17 when he topscored in the 1978 Metro.

=== Appearances ===
- The record for the highest number of games in the league is held by Hugo Gatti, with 765 for: Atlanta, River Plate, Gimnasia (LP), Unión and Boca Juniors.
- The record for the highest number of games for a single club is held by Ricardo Bochini, who played 638 games for Independiente, between 1972 and 1991.
- Pedro Catalano, a goalkeeper of Deportivo Español, holds the record for most consecutive matches, with a run of 333 uninterrupted matches between 27 July 1986 and 29 November 1994.

=== Expatriates ===
- Jorge José González (uruguayan) is the foreign footballer with most games in the division. He played 565 league´s games between 1966 and 1980: 487 matches for Rosario Central (between 1966 and 1978) and 78 for Vélez Sarsfield (1978-1980).
- James Rodríguez (Colombian) debuted for Banfield with 17 years of age in 2008, being the youngest ever expatriate footballer to play in the Argentine Primera.

=== Negative ===
- Roberto Trotta holds the record for the most sendings off. He received 17 red cards in total, playing for Estudiantes, Vélez Sársfield, River Plate, Racing Club and Unión.
- In 1941, Uruguayan goalkeeper Horacio Granero, who had been hired by Atlanta was fired after three matches: Atlanta lost 5–0 to River Plate, 7–2 to Boca Juniors, and drew 6–6 with Estudiantes, totaling 18 goals conceded and an average of six goals per match.

== Managers ==
- The three most successful managers have won seven titles each. Ángel Labruna won his seven with Rosario Central and River Plate, while Carlos Bianchi won his seven with Vélez Sársfield and Boca Juniors, and Ramón Díaz won six Primera División titles with River Plate and one with San Lorenzo.
- Only two managers have won three titles with three different teams. José Yudica won the 1978 Metro with Quilmes, the 1985 Nacional with Argentinos Juniors and the 1987–88 season with Newell's Old Boys. Américo Gallego won the 1994 Apertura and the 2000 Clausura with River Plate, the 2002 Apertura with Independiente and the 2004 Apertura with Newell's Old Boys.
- Juan José Pizzuti is the manager with the longest unbeaten run. His Racing Club was unbeaten for 39 games between 3 October 1965 and 28 August 1966.

== Tournaments ==
- The tournament with the highest goal average was in 1938, with 4.9 goals per match.

== Games ==
- The highest scoring games in the Argentine top flight were: Huracán 10–4 Rosario Central in 1945, Racing Club 11–3 Rosario Central in 1960, and Banfield 13–1 Puerto Comercial de Bahía Blanca in the 1974 Nacional.
- The match between Banfield and Puerto Comercial also holds another three records: Juan Taverna scored seven goals, which is the most goals by a player in a single match, the most goals scored by a team in a single match with 13, and the record for the largest margin of victory ever (12 goals).
- The world record for the longest penalty shootout occurred in a league match when Argentinos Juniors beat Racing Club 20–19 on a penalty shootout after 44 penalties were taken, in 1988. The rules of the time granted an extra point for the winner on penalties after a tied match.
- The match between Chacarita Juniors and Argentino de Quilmes in 1939 that Chacarita won 5–1, was the match with most headed goals, and the most headed goals by a player in a single match. Fabio Cassán headed four goals, and Argentino de Quilmes also scored with a header, totaling five goals for the match.
- The 6–6 draw between Atlanta and Estudiantes de La Plata, and between Gimnasia y Esgrima La Plata and Colón (2000 Clausura) is the highest score draw ever.
