= History of Racing Club de Avellaneda =

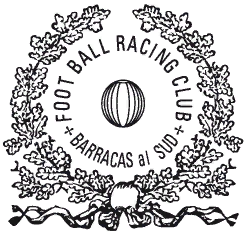
First seal of the club with the legend "Foot Ball Racing Club - Barracas al Sud" (1903)

The origins of Argentine club Racing Club de Avellaneda can be traced to late 1890s, when a football team was founded by a group of workers of British-origin company Buenos Aires Great Southern Railway, then followed by other institutions which can be considered predecessors to the current club. Originally named "Foot Ball Racing Club", the club was officially established in 1903, taking its name from an auto racing magazine.

Racing affiliated to Argentine Football Association (AFA) in 1905 and began to compete in the lower division championships organised by the body. After a failed attempt to promote to Primera División at hands of River Plate, Racing finally promoted in 1910 after defeating Boca Juniors in the final.

The 1910s was a golden age for Racing so the team won a seven consecutive league titles (a record that remains unmatched to present days) between 1913 and 1919. Besides, Racing won nine national cups and two Rioplatense cups to totalise 18 titles won within the decade.

That huge success earned the club the nickname "Academia" (Academy of football), known for a creole style of play that set the standard and taught its rivals how the game should be played.

Nevertheless, the first great international success came in 1967 when the team won both, the 1967 Copa Libertadores and 1967 Intercontinental Cup, being the first Argentine side to win those trophies. Because of those achievements, Racing is considered "the first big" of Argentine football.

== Origins ==
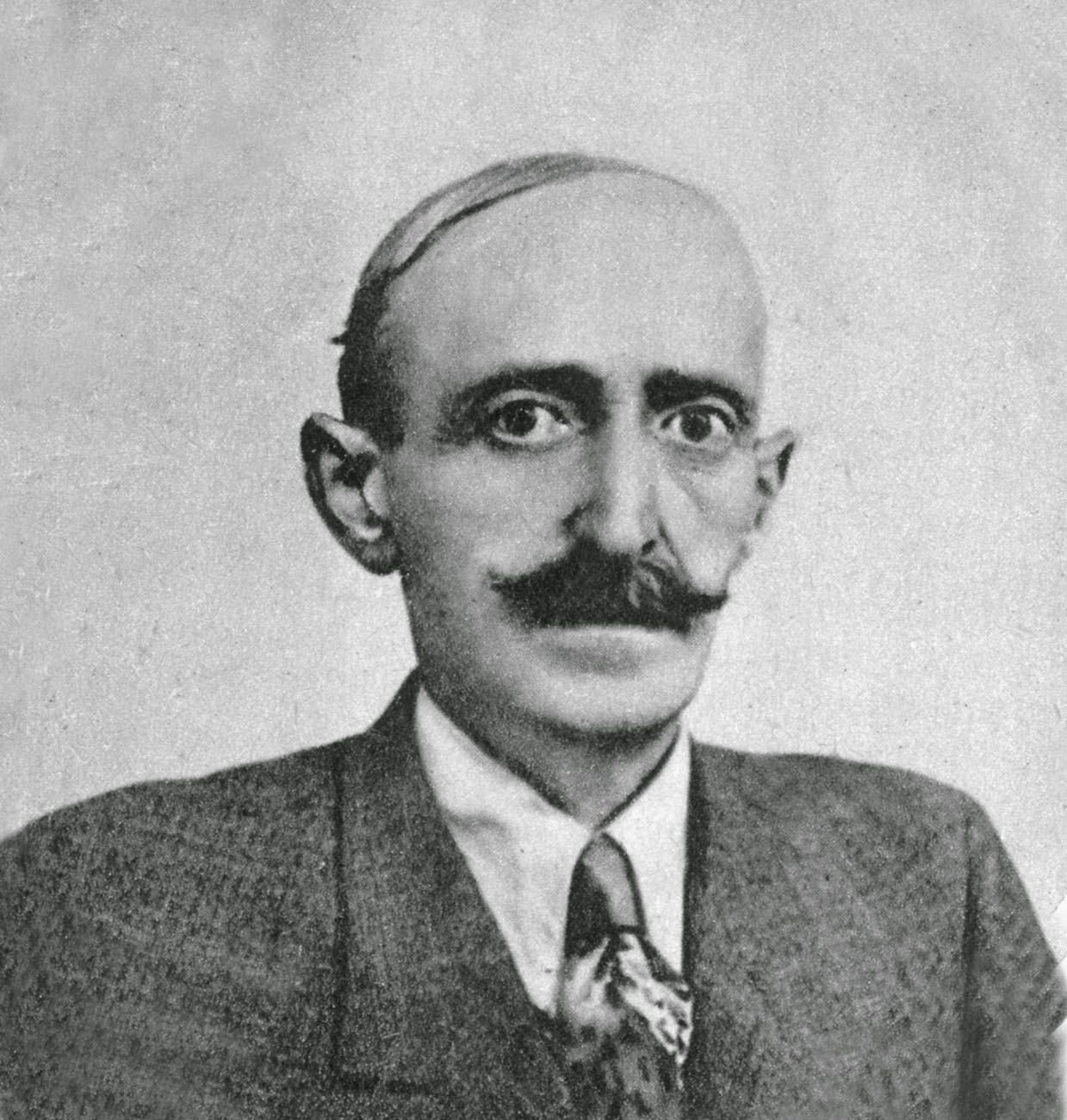
Arturo Artola, first president of Racing

Racing dates back to 1898, when a group of workers from the old Buenos Aires Great Southern Railway in the municipality of Barracas al Sud—today Avellaneda Partido—founded the Argentinos Excelsior Club. This early team played friendly matches against other local sides, many of which had been formed by British immigrants, and was based on a basic and undeveloped plot of land at Alsina y Colón (Alsina and Colón) streets, near the local livestock market. The site, owned by the railway company, had originally been granted by the local municipality and was later requested by the employees themselves to be used for playing football, a sport that was rapidly gaining popularity in Argentina at the time.

Despite the formation of this early football team, it eventually dissolved and gave way to the emergence of other local entities, notably Argentinos Unidos, American Club, and Sud América Football Club de Barracas al Sud. The latter was officially founded on 12 May 1901 by a group of alumni from the prestigious Colegio Nacional de Buenos Aires. What set Barracas al Sud apart was the distinctive nature of its founding membership, composed entirely of criollos—Argentine-born individuals of European descent—making it the first football club in the country to be established exclusively by native citizens, rather than by immigrants or foreign communities.

The founding members were: Arturo and Zenón Artola, Germán Vidaillac, Leandro Boloque, Pedro Viazzi, Pedro Werner, Alfredo and Raimundo Lamoure, Ignacio Oyarzábal, Ricardo Martín, Ernesto Martín, Salvador Sorhondo, Julio Planisi, Francisco Balestrieri, Bernardo Etcheverry, brothers Evaristo and Alfredo Paz, Enrique Poujade, Elías Camels, José Güimil, Juan Sepich, José Paz, Antonio Capurro, and Alejandro Carbone.

Barracas al Sud quickly found local success in its early football matches. However, internal disagreements among its members led to a significant split: on 16 March 1902, a large group broke away to establish a new institution, the Club Atlético Colorados Unidos del Sud. The venture ultimately proved unsuccessful, and as a result, Barracas al Sud itself failed to achieve the momentum it had originally aspired to.

In the wake of these setbacks, members from both clubs began to gather informally in the waiting room of the Barracas Iglesia railway station. It was there that a spirit of reconciliation took root, and they adopted the motto “United until death” as a symbol of their renewed unity and shared purpose. Thus, on 25 March 1903, Foot Ball Racing Club was officially founded. The club's name was inspired by a French magazine read by Germán Vidaillac—one of the founders, of French descent—which featured the word “Racing” prominently. Although the club had already begun operating, its official charter was formalised on 7 February 1904, during a meeting held at the Lamour brothers’ estate, where the founding act was drafted and recorded.

== First years in football ==
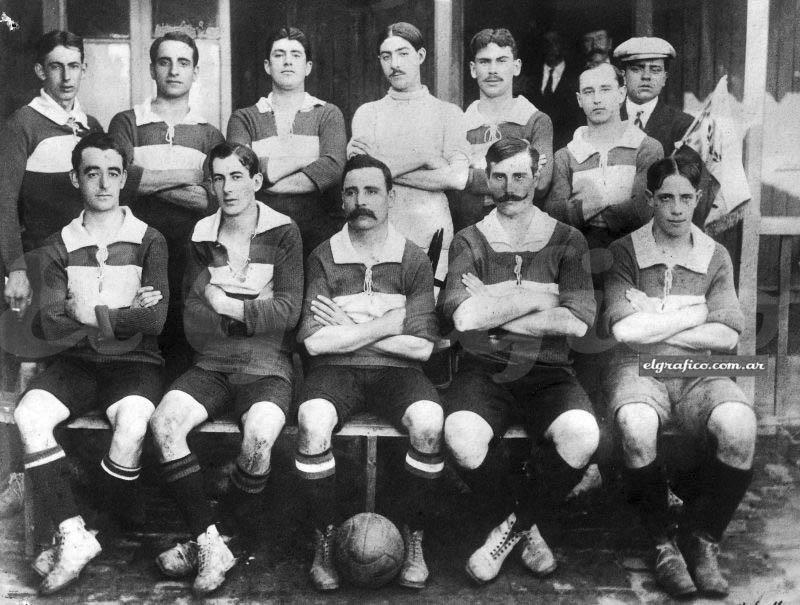
A team of Racing of 1910, when the squad promoted to Primera División

Initially, the club began by wearing a plain white shirt in order to reduce costs. However, on 23 July 1904, it formally adopted a black and yellow vertically striped jersey, similar to that of Uruguayan Central Uruguay Railway Cricket Club. Nevertheless the Association rejected the model (some sources state it was due to its similarity with other teams shirts), forcing the club to revert the decision just a week later. It have been also said that Racing Club worn a shirt featuring a chequered pattern in light blue and pink (allegedly introduced at the behest of Carbone), although there are neither photographic records nor documents that prove that model existed.

Racing registered with the Argentine Football Association in 1905 and began competing in the lower divisions of Argentine football league system. In 1906, the club registered to play in Second Division.

In 1908, Racing reached the final of the Second Division but was defeated 2–1 by River Plate. However, the match was annulled due to a pitch invasion by River's supporters. A replay was held on 27 December, in which Racing suffered a surprising and controversial 0–7 defeat. That same year, the club changed its kit once again, this time adopting a blue shirt with a white horizontal stripe across the chest.

In 1910, Racing once again reached the final of the Second Division, this time facing Boca Juniors. Racing emerged victorious with a 2–1 win, thus securing the long-awaited promotion to the top tier. That same year, as Argentina celebrated the centenary of the May Revolution, founding member Pedro Werner proposed a change to the club's kit to reflect the national colours of the flag of Argentina. The proposal was approved, and a new design was created—featuring light blue and white. However, the iconic strip made its official debut only on 8 June 1913, in a match against Unión, which Racing won emphatically by 8–1.

== La Academia and the seven consecutive ==
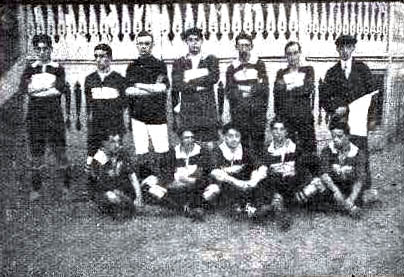
The 1911 team, wearing the blue and white shirt, which defeated the mighty Alumni 2–1

Racing made its Primera División debut on 7 May 1911, drawing 1–1 against San Isidro. In that same tournament, the club finished in an impressive fourth place.

In 1912, Racing secured its first national trophy, the Copa de Honor MCBA, with a 3–0 victory over Newell's Old Boys. That same year, the club also played its first international match, facing River Plate of Uruguay in the Copa de Honor Cousenier, where Racing narrowly lost 2–1.

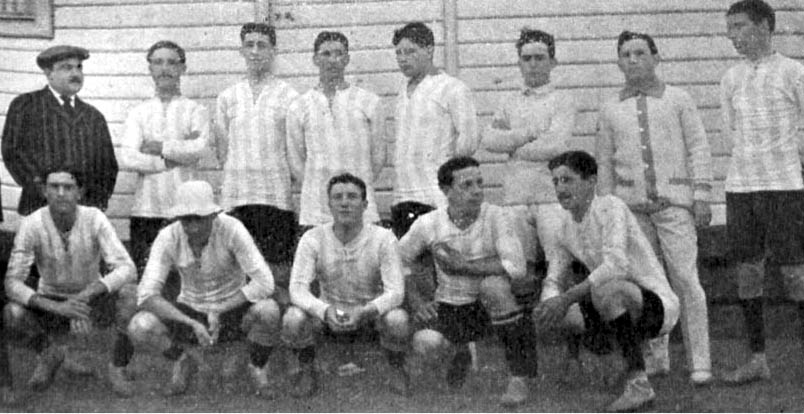
The 1913 team that won four titles in a year, including its first Primera División championship

In 1913, alongside the introduction of the now-iconic sky blue and white kit, Racing enjoyed a landmark season, securing four titles. The first was the Copa de Honor MCBA, earned with a 5–1 victory over Estudiantes (BA). The second was the Copa de Honor Cousenier, in which Racing defeated Uruguay's Nacional 4–3 on aggregate, claiming its first international trophy. The crowning achievement, however, came in the Argentine Primera División, where Racing triumphed 2–0 over San Isidro in the final—securing the club's first top-flight league title.

The year 1914 began with Racing being crowned champions of the 1913 Copa Ibarguren, secured with a 3–1 victory over Newell's Old Boys. Despite this title corresponding to the previous season, the 1914 campaign also brought further silverware. Racing won the league championship once again, defeating Ferro Carril Oeste by 2–0, with Estudiantes (BA) finishing as runners-up. The team delivered a dominant performance throughout the season, scoring 42 goals and conceding only 7 in just 12 matches. In addition, Racing claimed another Copa Ibarguren title, edging Rosario Central 1–0 in the final.

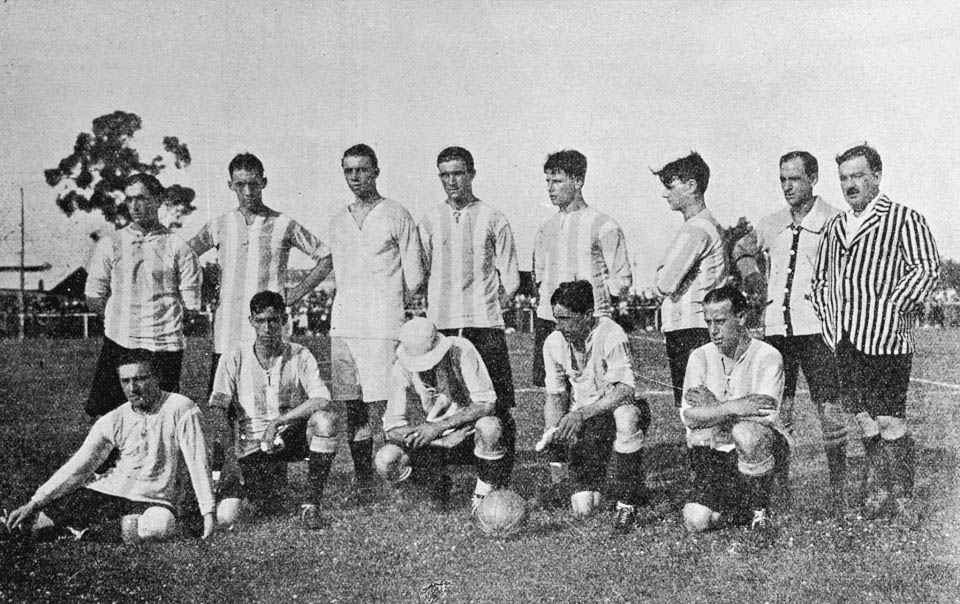
The 1915 team achieved an outstanding mark of 95 goals in 24 matches

From 1915 onwards, the team began to be nicknamed La Academia (The academy), a reflection of its elegant creole style football, which was seen as setting the standard in the Argentine game. The moniker is said to have taken hold following a memorable 3–0 away victory over River Plate. After the match, Racing supporters made their jubilant return to Avellaneda chanting: “La Academia, la Academia!”. That season marked Racing's third league championship, secured with a 1–0 victory over San Isidro in a play-off and finishing unbeaten, with 22 games won and 2 drawn. Racing also added to its growing trophy cabinet by winning the Copa de Honor MCBA, defeating Tiro Federal 2–1 in the final.

In 1916, Racing clinched the league title for the fourth consecutive year, once again defeating Ferro Carril Oeste by a 2–0 scoreline, with Platense finishing as runners-up. The club also secured the Copa Ibarguren, delivering a commanding 6–0 victory over Rosario Central in the final. Around this time, the Avellaneda derby began to take shape. Independiente, historically associated with socialist ideals, had recently established itself in the Avellaneda Partido. Its ideological stance stood in sharp contrast to Racing's leadership, which was aligned with the conservative National Autonomist Party.

In the 1917 season, Racing once again secured a quadruple, although three of them would be officially awarded the following year. The first was the league championship, their fifth consecutive title, clinched after a victory over Gimnasia y Esgrima (LP), with River Plate finishing as runners-up. The other three trophies were the Copa de Honor MCBA, won after a 3–2 over River Plate; Copa Ibarguren, won after a 3–2 triumph over Rosario Central, and the Copa Aldao, Racing's second international title, earned by defeating Uruguay's Nacional 4–3 on aggregate.

In 1918, Racing achieved a treble, with one of the titles officially awarded the following year. The first was the league championship, which they won undefeated, crowned after a 4–1 victory over Platense, with River Plate once again finishing second. They also claimed the Copa Ibarguren, defeating Newell's Old Boys 4–0 in the final. Later came the Copa Aldao, marking the club's third and final Río de la Plata trophy, secured with a 2–1 win over Peñarol.

In 1919, Racing joined the breakaway league, the Asociación Amateurs de Football, where it won the league championship for the seventh consecutive time, defeating Tigre 2–1, with Vélez Sarsfield as runners-up. It was also their third unbeaten title, sealing the legendary heptacampeonato (seven-time consecutive champion), making Racing the first club in the world to win seven league titles in a row. The streak ended in 1920, with Racing finishing as runners-up, but the team reclaimed the crown in 1921 with a 3–0 victory over River Plate, the same side that had halted their run the year before. Racing's final amateur title came in the 1925 season, after a 1–1 draw against Excursionistas, a result that denied San Lorenzo the league title.

== League title drought and La Guardia Imperial ==
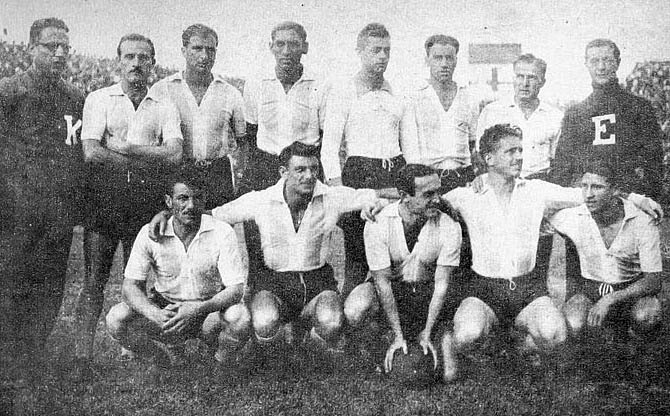
The 1945 team that beat Boca Juniors by 4–1 in 1945

The professional era of Argentine football began in 1931, with Racing joining the breakaway Liga Argentina de Football, which was later recognized by the Argentine Football Association in 1934. Racing played its first professional match on 4 June 1931, defeating Platense 5–1.

In 1933, Racing won two titles. The first was the 1932 Copa Beccar Varela, which—though corresponding to the previous season—was secured with a 3–0 victory over Boca Juniors, in a final group that also included Tigre. The second was the Copa de Competencia (LAF), claimed after a 4–0 win over San Lorenzo in the final.

On 5 August 1937, the Argentine Football Association introduced proportional voting in its decision-making process. Five clubs were granted three votes each: Boca Juniors, Independiente, Racing, River Plate, and San Lorenzo. From that point on, both the public and the sports media began referring to them collectively as the Big Five.

In 1945, Racing won the Copa de Competencia Británica after defeating Boca Juniors 4–1 in the final. Despite securing three domestic titles during this early professional era, the period was largely marked by a lack of league championships, with the team often finishing in mid-table positions.

During these years, the club expanded its membership base despite its title drought. A journalist—reportedly Américo Barrios—nicknamed the club's supporters La Guardia Imperial (The Imperial Guard) in recognition of their loyalty during this period without championships.

== Return to league titles ==
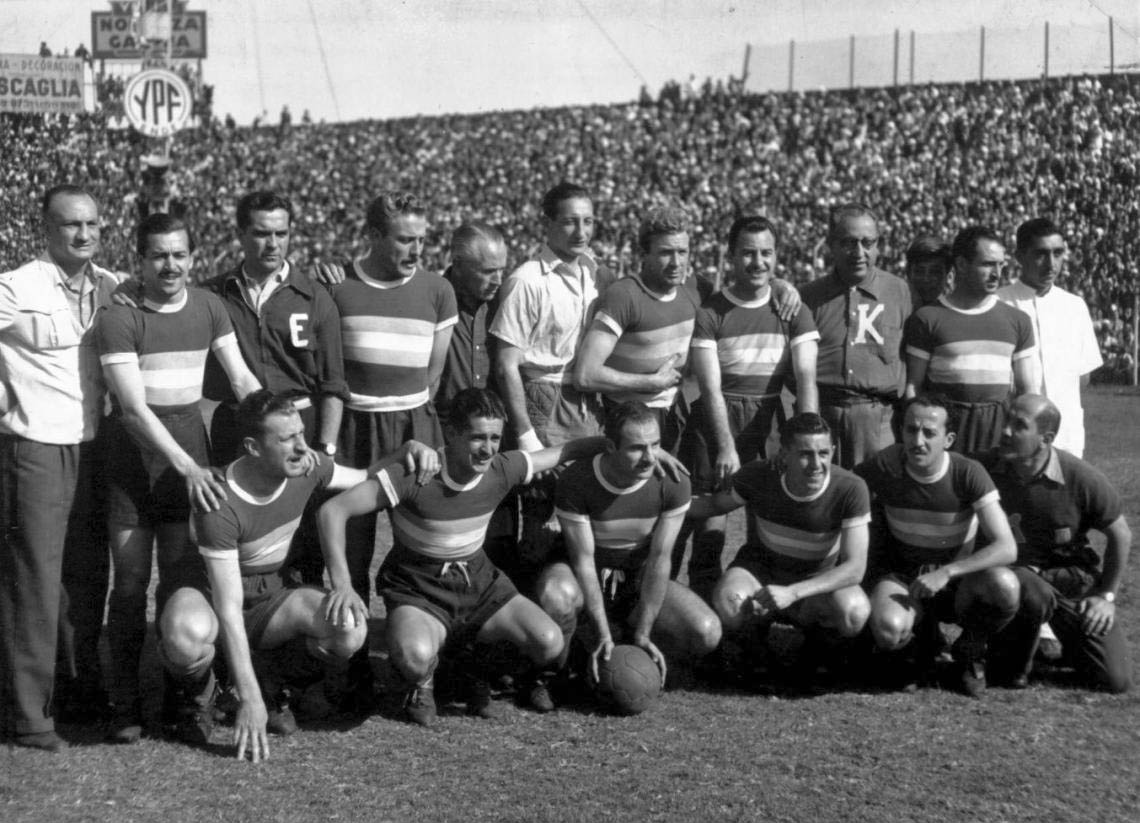
The 1951 team that secured three consecutive league titles

In 1949, Racing returned to glory by clinching the league championship after a 2–1 victory over Boca Juniors, ending River Plate’s hopes of catching them. During this period, the club's dominance on the pitch made it widely disliked by rival supporters, some of whom claimed Racing was benefiting from political favoritism—particularly from Juan Perón's Finance Minister Ramón Cereijo.

In 1950, Racing won the league title once again. Despite a 3–0 loss to Banfield, the result eliminated Boca Juniors from title contention.

In 1951, Racing finished the league tied for first place with Banfield, prompting a playoff final. After a 0–0 draw in the first match, a second final was held, where Racing secured a 1–0 victory to claim its third consecutive championship. This made Racing the first team to win three consecutive professional championships, despite playing the decisive match at San Lorenzo’s stadium with most of the crowd against them, with Guillermo Stábile as head coach and an exceptional attacking line featuring Norberto Méndez, Rubén Bravo, Llamil Simes, Mario Boyé and Ezra Sued. The following year, they finished runners-up to River Plate.

In 1958, under the management of José Della Torre, Racing secured the league title after a 3–3 draw with Lanús, finishing ahead of both Boca Juniors and San Lorenzo. At a time when Argentine football was suffering from low attendance following the national team’s failure at the 1958 FIFA World Cup, Racing stood out with a solid defense led by Pedro Dellacha and a dynamic attacking line featuring Oreste Corbatta, Juan José Pizzuti, Pedro Manfredini, Rubén Héctor Sosa, and Raúl Belén. The following year, they finished runners-up to San Lorenzo.

In 1960, despite finishing fourth in the league, Racing recorded the biggest official win in its history with an 11–3 victory over Rosario Central.

In 1961, under the management of Saúl Ongaro, Racing won the league title after defeating San Lorenzo 3–2, with the latter finishing as runners-up. This was the first time since its inauguration that the championship-deciding match was played at El Cilindro, rather than away or on neutral ground. The team stood out for its collective style of play and reliance on Argentine players—except for two Uruguayans—at a time when many clubs sought foreign signings to promote so-called Fútbol Espectáculo (Show Football) in Argentina. They qualified for the 1962 Copa Libertadores but were eliminated in the group stage, sharing the group with Nacional of Uruguay and Sporting Cristal of Peru.

== José's Team and international success ==
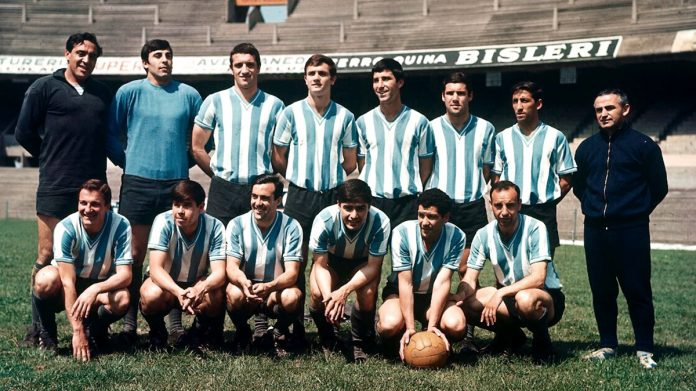
The José Team that won the Argentine Primera División, the Copa Libertadores, and the Intercontinental Cup

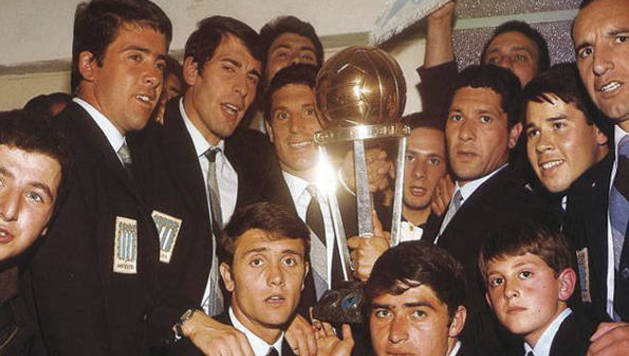
The 1967 team, newly crowned world champions

In 1965, the club underwent a significant institutional crisis, prompting the appointment of the recently retired Juan José Pizzuti as head coach. Pizzuti's inaugural match in charge culminated in a 3–1 triumph over River Plate. He promptly committed to integrating the club's promising youth prospects—namely Roberto Perfumo, Alfio Basile, Agustín Cejas, and Rubén Osvaldo Díaz—thereby laying the foundations of a formidable squad that would embark upon an extraordinary 39-match unbeaten run. This team rapidly endeared itself to the supporters, who immortalized it through a chant, dubbing it Equipo de José (José's Team). The unbeaten streak was ultimately halted in 1966 with a 2–0 away defeat to River Plate; however, this setback did not preclude the team from securing the championship title following a goalless draw against Gimnasia y Esgrima (LP). Notably, the sole loss was inflicted by the very club that would finish as runners-up that season.

In 1967, Racing finished second in the Torneo Metropolitano after losing the final 3–0 to Estudiantes (LP) at San Lorenzo. At the same time, they competed in the Copa Libertadores, placed in a group with River Plate, Bolívar and 31 de Octubre from Bolivia, and Santa Fe and Independiente Medellín from Colombia. A trip to Medellín nearly ended in tragedy, but the players arrived safely. In the semifinals, Racing advanced from a group that included River Plate again, Colo-Colo from Chile, and Universitario from Peru, which required a playoff to decide the standings. The finals against Uruguayan Nacional ended with two 0–0 draws, and Racing won the title after a playoff held at Santiago. Norberto Raffo was the top scorer with 13 goals.

Between October and November, Racing contested the Intercontinental Cup against Celtic of Scotland. Following a 1–0 loss in Glasgow and a 2–1 win in Avellaneda, the tie was decided in a playoff held in Montevideo, where Racing secured a 1–0 victory. With that result, Racing were crowned champions of the World Club Championship, becoming the first Argentine to achieve the title.

In 1968, Racing finished third in a three-team group of the Nacional Championship, which it shared with River Plate and Vélez Sarsfield, the champions. In 1969, Pizzuti left the team to manage the Argentina national football team.

== Relegation ==
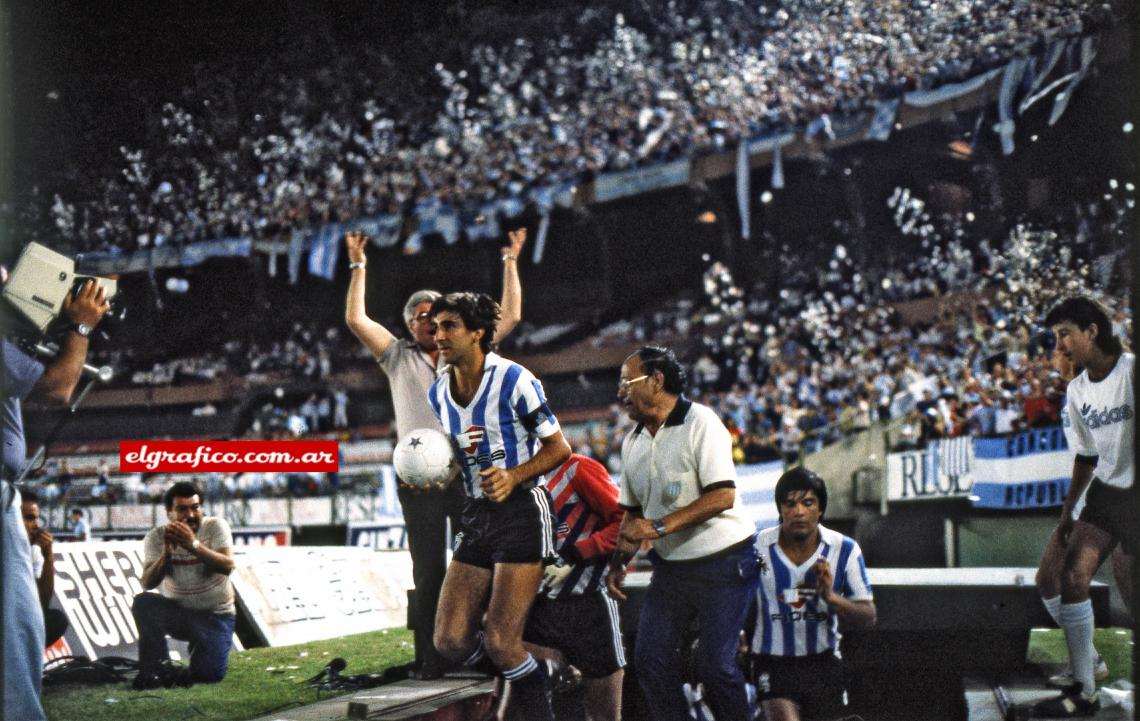
Gustavo Costas leading the Racing team that played the first leg vs Atlanta to promote to Primera División, December 1985

After the world title victory, difficult years followed for Racing. The most notable achievement was finishing as runners-up in the 1972 Metropolitano Championship, behind San Lorenzo. However, the 1970s were marked by battles to avoid relegation from the Primera División.

In 1983, due to the implementation of an average points system to determine which team would be relegated to Primera División B, and after losing a match 4–3 against Racing (C), Racing was relegated to the Second Division.

In 1984, after finishing as runners-up to Deportivo Español, Racing contested the second promotion spot in an eight-team playoff. They reached the final against Gimnasia y Esgrima (LP), but lost 7–3 on aggregate. Despite this, a year later Racing once again finished as runners-up, this time to Rosario Central. In the subsequent eight-team playoff, they reached the final against Atlanta, where they won 5–1 on aggregate and secured promotion to the Primera División.

Due to a scheduling change in the AFA calendar, Racing went six months without playing until the start of the 1986–87 season. During this period, the football team was loaned to Atlético Argentino from Mendoza Province, which participated in regional matches.

== Return to international success ==
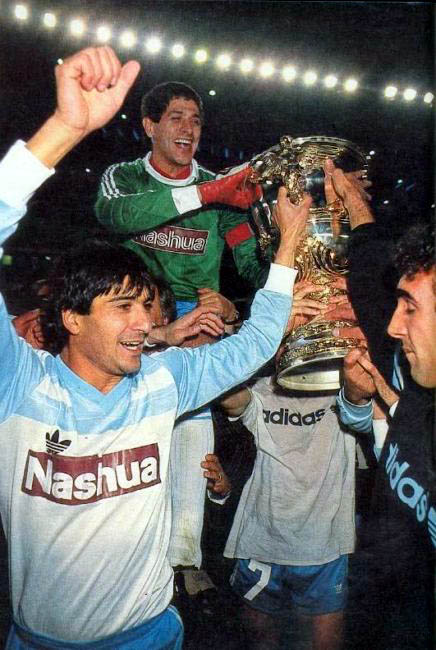
Racing players with the 1988 Supercopa title in Belo Horizonte, the first international title for the club after 21 years

Racing won its third international competition in 1988, when the team won the first edition of the 1988 Supercopa Libertadores, defeating Brazilian team Cruzeiro in the finals, with Alfio Basile still as coach. That same year Racing won the non-official Supercopa Interamericana beating Herediano from Costa Rica 3–0. The following year, Racing played the inaugural edition of the Recopa Sudamericana in 1989 against the winners of the 1988 Copa Libertadores, Club Nacional. Nacional won the first leg in Montevideo 1–0; Racing wasn't able to turn the score around in the second leg in Buenos Aires, and the Uruguayan club won the title.

In 1992, Racing played the Supercopa Libertadores finals against Cruzeiro again. In the first match, Cruzeiro defeated them 4–0 in Belo Horizonte. Racing won the second match 1–0 but the cup was awarded to the Brazilian team with a 4–1 aggregate score.

Racing came very close to winning the league title in the 90s; in the 1993 Apertura they finished third, tied with Velez and just one point from the champion, River Plate. In the 1995 Apertura they finished runner-ups.

== Bankruptcy and resurrection ==
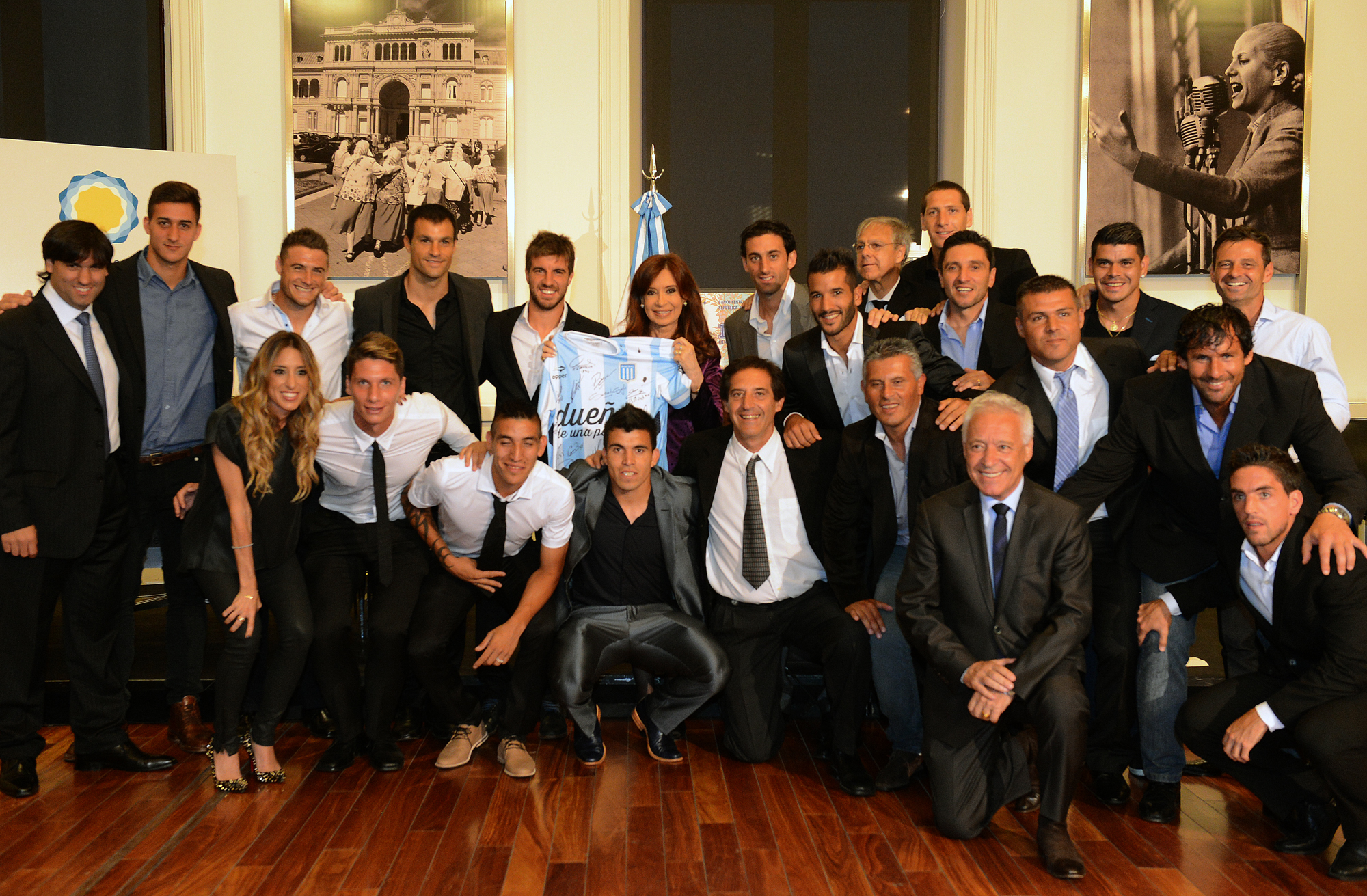
Racing players celebrating the 2014 championship at the Casa Rosada (Pink House) with president Cristina Fernández

In July 1998, club president Daniel Lalín declared bankruptcy, leaving many supporters outraged. Lalin had been accused as the main reason for the club's debt because he spent large amounts of money on players, instead of bringing them up from the youth academy. In March 1999, a top member of the club said Racing "had officially ceased to exist". However, with the massive support of the fans, they convinced the club to implement the Trust law, saving it from liquidation. In December 2000, the club was taken over by Blanquiceleste SA and was managed by the company until 2008.

They won the league title in December 2001 for the first time in 35 years, and the title was celebrated at Estadio Jose Amalfitani, Vélez Sarsfield's home stadium, after the last fixture with them finished in a draw.

In 2008, the club was almost relegated and had to play a promotion play-off against Belgrano. This was due to poor performances in the last 3 seasons, including a last-place finish in the 2008 Clausura. The first leg was played in Córdoba on 25 June and ended 1–1. In the second leg, Racing won 1–0 at home, and with a 2–1 aggregate score, was able to maintain its permanence in the top tier.

In 2012, Racing reached the 2012 Copa Argentina Final, where the squad lost to Boca Juniors 2–1.

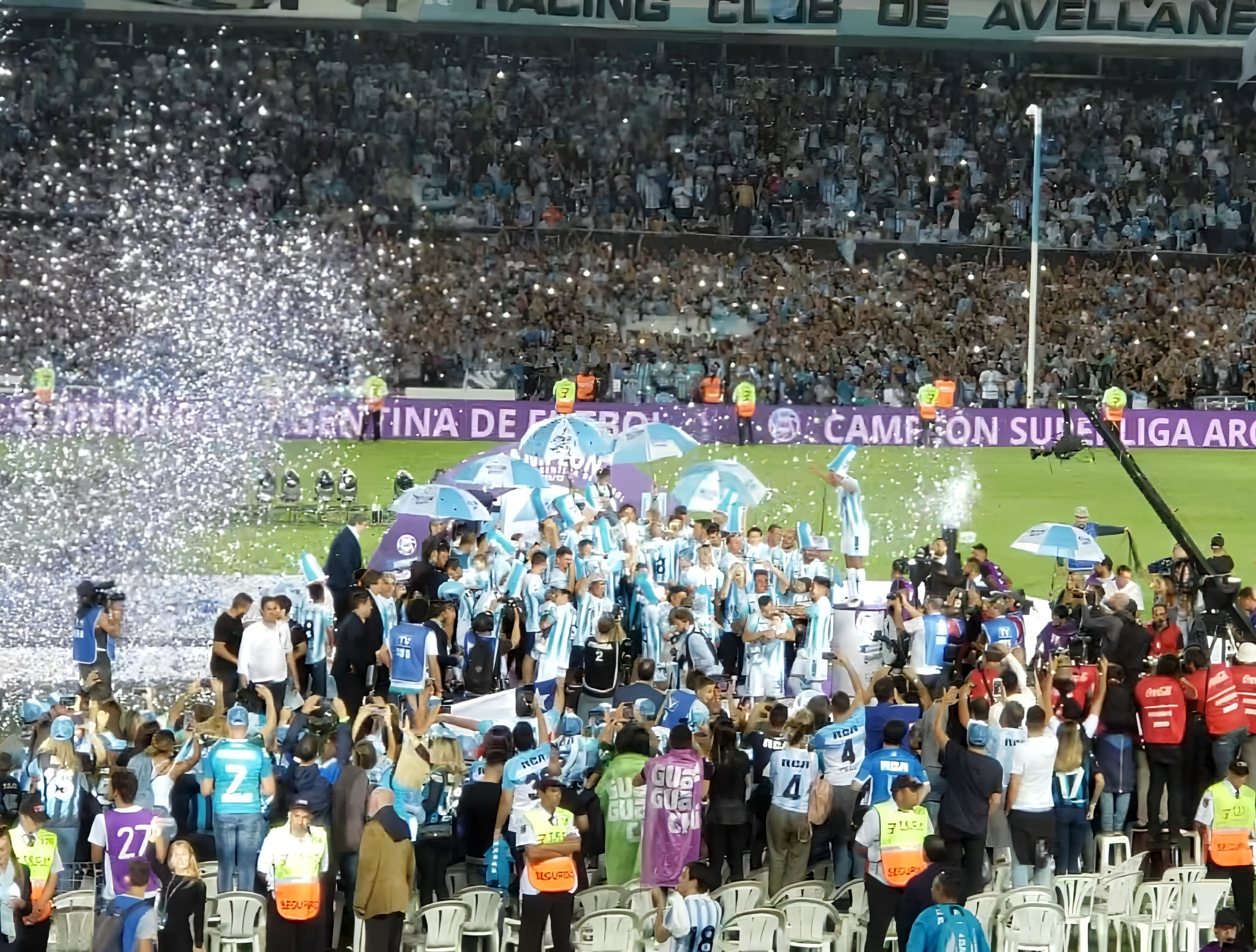
The Racing Club team champion of the Superliga 2018-19

In June 2014, Diego Cocca was hired as head coach. Two days after Cocca signed his contract, former player and fan favorite Diego Milito left Inter Milan and returned to the club to play the 2014 Torneo de Transición. In December 2014, Racing won its 17th Primera División title in the last fixture of the tournament. If Racing drew but River Plate won their match against Quilmes, then the title would've gone to River. However, the team defeated Godoy Cruz 1–0 to secure the 1st place and be crowned champions for the first time in 13 years.

They won the league in 2018–19. Lisandro López was the top scorer of the tournament with 17 goals, and at the age of 36 he was the oldest player to be league top scorer. In December 2019, Racing became champion of the Trofeo de Campeones de la Superliga Argentina by beating the defending champion of the Copa de la Superliga, Tigre, 2–0, with both goals from Matías Rojas.

In 2020, aeronautical company Aeroset was announced as Racing's new main sponsor. The deal was renewed in 2022.

In November 2022, Racing became champions of the Trofeo de Campeones de la Liga Profesional by defeating the last champions of the 2022 Primera División, Boca Juniors, 2–1.

In February 2023, Racing became champion of the Supercopa Internacional by beating rival Boca Juniors, 2–1.

In May 2023, the international online casino company Betsson was announced as Racing's shirt sponsor for the 2023–2024 season.

In November 2024, Racing became champion of the Copa Sudamericana after 36 years since their last international cup, by beating Cruzeiro, 3–1.

At the beginning of 2025 Diego Milito becomes the new president of the club, in 27 February Racing became champion of the Recopa Sudamericana, beating Botafogo, winning 2–0 in home and away matches for an 4–0 aggregate.
