= Herbert Dorning =

Anglo-Argentine sportsperson (1874–1955)

Personal information
- Full name: Herbert Dorning
- Born: 1874; Lancashire, England
- Died: 2 February 1955 (aged 80); Perranmar, Cornwall, England
- Batting: Left-handed
- Bowling: Left-arm fast-medium Left-arm medium

Career statistics
Competition	First-class
Matches	9
Runs scored	190
Batting average	14.61
100s/50s	–/–
Top score	40
Balls bowled	2,066
Wickets	39
Bowling average	20.25
5 wickets in innings	2
10 wickets in match	2
Best bowling	7/38
Catches/stumpings	3/–
- Source: Cricinfo, 27 January 2022

Herbert Dorning (1874 — 2 February 1955) was an Anglo-Argentine first-class cricketer and footballer.

== Background ==
Dorning was born in Lancashire in England in 1874. Having emigrated to Argentina, Dorning was an important figure in the early years of Argentine cricket and was referred to as "the W. G. Grace of Argentine cricket". He made his debut in first-class cricket for Argentina against the touring Marylebone Cricket Club (MCC) in February 1912, playing two matches. He began playing club cricket for the Belgrano Athletic Club in 1919 and later captained them for many years. He continued to play first-class cricket for Argentina against touring English sides until 1930, having made a total of nine first-class appearances since his debut in 1912. An all-rounder, he scored 190 runs with the bat at an average of 14.61, with a highest score of 40. Dorning was originally a left-arm fast-medium, but later changed to medium pace. As a bowler in first-class cricket, he took 39 wickets at a bowling average of 20.25; he twice took five wickets in and innings and ten wickets in a match, with his best innings figures of 7 for 38 coming against Pelham Warner's touring MCC side in 1927. Dorning was a prolific bowler in Argentine domestic cricket, taking 210 wickets in 33 annual North v South matches. Alongside his playing career, Dorning was also president of the Argentine Cricket Association.

A talented sportsman away from cricket, Dorning played both rugby union and football. In football he played for Belgrano A.C. and was the top goalscorer in the 1901 Argentine Primera División, with 5 goals. He returned to England after the Second World War, where he died in Cornwall at Perranarworthal in February 1955, aged 80. His son, Noel, captained Cornwall County Cricket Club in minor counties cricket.
