= 1964 Argentine Primera División =

73rd season of top-tier football league in Argentina

Primera División
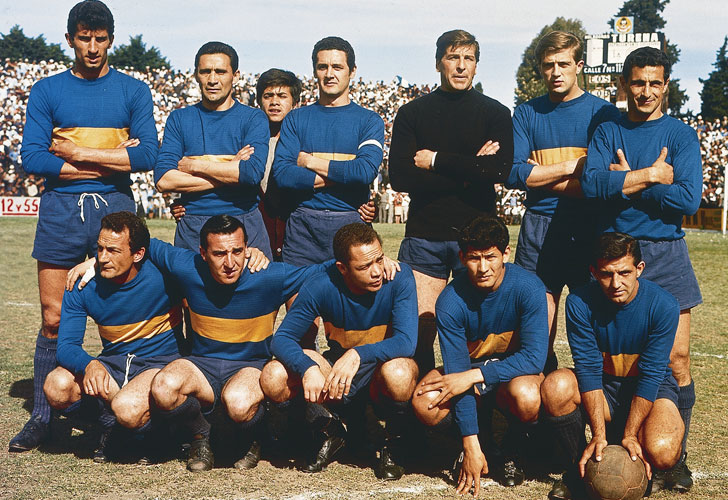
- Boca Juniors, champions
- Season: 1964
- Champions: Boca Juniors (15th title)
- Promoted: Ferro C. Oeste; Newell's Old Boys
- Relegated: (none)
- 1965 Copa Libertadores: Boca Juniors
- Top goalscorer: (Argentina) Héctor Veira (17 goals)

The 1964 Argentine Primera División was the 73rd season of top-flight football in Argentina. The season began on April 26 and ended on November 29.

Boca Juniors won the championship (15th league title) with no teams relegated.

== League standings ==
Pos	Team	Pld	W	D	L	GF	GA	GD	Pts
1	Boca Juniors	30	17	10	3	35	15	+20	44
2	Independiente	30	15	8	7	44	26	+18	38
3	River Plate	30	13	11	6	42	30	+12	37
4	San Lorenzo	30	12	12	6	46	31	+15	36
5	Atlanta	30	12	11	7	46	42	+4	35
6	Racing	30	12	8	10	45	37	+8	32
6	Banfield	30	11	10	9	34	32	+2	32
8	Vélez Sársfield	30	12	7	11	43	36	+7	31
9	Huracán	30	10	9	11	38	36	+2	29
9	Ferro Carril Oeste	30	9	11	10	33	33	0	29
11	Rosario Central	30	7	14	9	37	38	−1	28
12	Chacarita Juniors	30	9	9	12	32	48	−16	27
13	Gimnasia y Esgrima (LP)	30	6	13	11	27	36	−9	25
14	Estudiantes (LP)	30	6	12	12	36	47	−11	24
15	Argentinos Juniors	30	4	9	17	26	45	−19	17
16	Newell's Old Boys	30	1	14	15	19	51	−32	16
