= 1948 Argentine Primera División =

57th season of top-tier football league in Argentina

Primera División
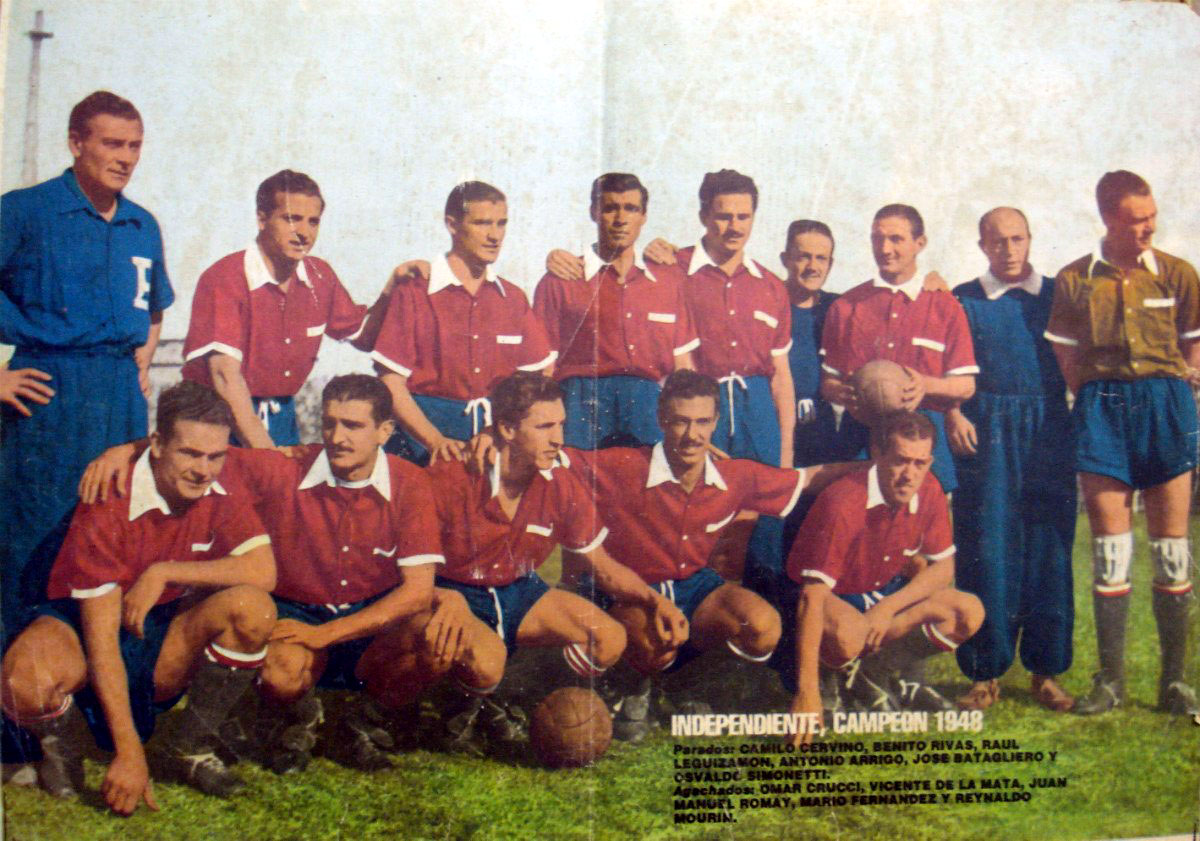
- Independiente, champions
- Season: 1948
- Champions: Independiente (5th title)
- Promoted: Gimnasia y Esgrima (LP)
- Relegated: (none)
- Top goalscorer: (Argentina) Benjamín Santos (21 goals)

The 1948 Argentine Primera División was the 57th season of top-flight football in Argentina. The season began on April 18 and ended on December 12.

Due to a players' strike demanding better working conditions, relegations were suspended until the conflict was solved. As the championship continued normally and the Ministry of Labour ruled the maximum salary for football players would be mn$ 1,500, several players emigrated in search of better opportunities, most to Colombia which was not affiliated to FIFA by then. Some of the most notable footballers that emigrated were Adolfo Pedernera, Alfredo Di Stéfano, Pipo Rossi, Antonio Sastre, René Pontoni, and Julio Cozzi.

Gimnasia y Esgrima (LP) returned to Primera, while no teams were relegated. Independiente won its 5th title.

== League standings ==
Pos	Team	Pld	W	D	L	GF	GA	GD	Pts
1	Independiente	30	17	7	6	65	42	+23	41
2	River Plate	30	12	13	5	59	48	+11	37
3	Estudiantes (LP)	30	16	4	10	63	45	+18	36
4	Racing	30	15	6	9	68	45	+23	36
4	Newell's Old Boys	30	12	8	10	54	37	+17	32
4	San Lorenzo	30	12	8	10	55	54	+1	32
4	Vélez Sársfield	30	11	10	9	44	44	0	32
8	Boca Juniors	30	10	10	10	52	47	+5	30
8	Platense	30	11	8	11	57	65	−8	30
10	Huracán	30	11	7	12	45	49	−4	29
11	Chacarita Juniors	30	9	10	11	45	48	−3	28
12	Rosario Central	30	12	3	15	74	73	+1	27
13	Banfield	30	9	6	15	54	67	−13	24
14	Tigre	30	8	7	15	56	81	−25	23
14	Lanús	30	5	13	12	38	57	−19	23
16	Gimnasia y Esgrima (LP)	30	6	8	16	51	78	−27	20
