= 1901 Argentine Primera División =

10th season of top-tier football league in Argentina

Primera División
- Season: 1901
- Champions: Alumni (2nd title)
- Promoted: (none)
- Relegated: (none)
- Tie Cup: (all Argentine teams)
- Matches played: 12
- Goals scored: 36 (3 per match)
- Top goalscorer: (England) Herbert Dorning (Belgrano A.C.) (5 goals)
- Biggest home win: Belgrano A.C. 8–2 Quilmes
- Biggest away win: Lomas 0–3 Quilmes

The 1901 Argentine Primera División was the tenth season of top-flight football in Argentina. The season began on May 19 and ended on August 30.

The season saw English High School changing its name to "Alumni Athletic Club", due to a regulation from the Association stating that football teams were not allowed to be named the same as the Schools they belonged to. The new denomination was inspired by the Alumni Associations of the United States, formed by ex-students who wanted to keep the ties of friendship with their old schoolmates. Under its new name Alumni retained the Argentine championship by winning all six of its games.

The championship continued with the 4 team league format, with each team playing each other twice.

== Final standings ==
Pos	Team	Pld	W	D	L	GF	GA	GD	Pts
1	Alumni (C)	6	6	0	0	10	1	+9	12
2	Belgrano A.C.	6	3	0	3	14	9	+5	6
3	Quilmes	6	2	0	4	9	15	−6	4
4	Lomas	6	1	0	5	3	11	−8	2

(C) Champions
