= 2000–01 Argentine Primera División =

110th season of top-tier football league in Argentina

Primera División
- Season: 2000–01
- Dates: July 28, 2000 – July 11, 2001
- Champions: Apertura: Boca Juniors (25th title); Clausura: San Lorenzo (13th title)
- 2002 Copa Libertadores: Boca Juniors; River Plate; San Lorenzo; Talleres (C); Vélez Sársfield
- 2001 Copa Mercosur: Boca Juniors (Note: Guest team.); River Plate; Independiente; San Lorenzo; Talleres (C); Vélez Sársfield
- Matches played: 380

The 2000–01 Argentine Primera División was the 110th season of top-flight football in Argentina. The season ran from July 28, 2000 to July 11, 2001.

Boca Juniors won the Apertura (its 25th league title) and San Lorenzo the Clausura (13th title) championships, while Los Andes and Almagro were relegated after spending only one season in the highest division.

== Torneo Apertura ==
Apertura
- Season: 2000
- Dates: 28 July – 18 December
- Champions: Boca Juniors (25th. title)
- Promoted: Huracán; Los Andes; Almagro
- Top goalscorer: (Colombia) Juan Pablo Angel (13)
- Biggest home win: River Plate 5–1 Almagro (27 May)
- Biggest away win: Estudiantes LP 0–5 S. Lorenzo (13 May)
- Highest scoring: Lanús 4–5 San Lorenzo (16 Mar)

=== League standings ===
Pos	Team	Pld	W	D	L	GF	GA	GD	Pts
1	Boca Juniors	19	12	5	2	35	19	+16	41
2	River Plate	19	10	7	2	41	24	+17	37
3	Gimnasia y Esgrima (LP)	19	11	4	4	36	29	+7	37
4	Talleres (C)	19	11	3	5	31	21	+10	36
5	San Lorenzo	19	10	4	5	33	18	+15	34
6	Vélez Sársfield	19	7	8	4	26	20	+6	29
7	Estudiantes (LP)	19	7	8	4	22	17	+5	29
8	Huracán	19	6	9	4	26	21	+5	27
9	Chacarita Juniors	19	8	3	8	19	24	−5	27
10	Colón	19	7	5	7	29	23	+6	26
11	Unión	19	6	8	5	23	21	+2	26
12	Rosario Central	19	6	6	7	28	31	−3	24
13	Newell's Old Boys	19	5	9	5	18	23	−5	24
14	Independiente	19	6	5	8	24	23	+1	23
15	Lanús	19	5	6	8	24	26	−2	21
16	Belgrano	19	3	8	8	22	31	−9	17
17	Argentinos Juniors	19	2	8	9	18	28	−10	14
18	Almagro	19	2	7	10	18	31	−13	13
19	Los Andes	19	3	3	13	21	46	−25	12
20	Racing	19	1	8	10	12	30	−18	11

=== Top scorers ===
Rank.	Player	Team	Goals
1	(Colombia) Juan Pablo Ángel	River Plate	13
2	(Argentina) Martín Palermo	Boca Juniors	11
2	(Argentina) Bernardo Romeo	San Lorenzo	11
3	(Argentina) Ariel Pereyra	Gimnasia y Esgrima (LP)	10

== Torneo Clausura ==
Clausura
- Season: 2001
- Dates: 9 February – 11 June
- Champions: San Lorenzo (13th. title)
- Relegated: Los Andes; Almagro
- Top goalscorer: (Argentina) Bernardo Romeo (15)
- Biggest home win: Lanús 6–0 Los Andes (10 Sep)
- Biggest away win: Los Andes 0–4 River Plate (17 Sep)
- Highest scoring: Almagro 4–5 River Plate (3 Dec)

=== League standings ===
Pos	Team	Pld	W	D	L	GF	GA	GD	Pts	Qualification
1	San Lorenzo	19	15	2	2	43	17	+26	47	Qualification for Copa Libertadores
2	River Plate	19	13	2	4	48	27	+21	41	
3	Boca Juniors	19	8	6	5	29	26	+3	30	
4	Argentinos Juniors	19	8	5	6	27	22	+5	29	
5	Racing	19	7	8	4	21	20	+1	29	
6	Chacarita Juniors	19	8	5	6	21	25	−4	29	
7	Huracán	19	8	4	7	28	28	0	28	
8	Vélez Sársfield	19	7	6	6	25	24	+1	27	
9	Estudiantes (LP)	19	7	6	6	23	24	−1	27	
10	Almagro	19	7	5	7	27	27	0	26	
11	Talleres (C)	19	7	4	8	23	23	0	25	
12	Newell's Old Boys	19	7	3	9	27	28	−1	24	
13	Colón	19	6	5	8	21	27	−6	23	
14	Lanús	19	6	4	9	28	30	−2	22	
15	Unión	19	5	5	9	32	36	−4	20	
16	Belgrano	19	5	5	9	18	26	−8	20	
17	Independiente	19	5	4	10	18	21	−3	19	
18	Gimnasia y Esgrima (LP)	19	4	6	9	22	28	−6	18	
19	Los Andes	19	5	6	8	24	32	−8	18 (Note: Los Andes had 3 points deducted.)	
20	Rosario Central	19	4	5	10	24	38	−14	17	

=== Top scorers ===
Rank.	Player	Team	Goals
1	(Argentina) Bernardo Romeo	San Lorenzo	15
2	(Argentina) Martín Cardetti	River Plate	13
3	(Argentina) Javier Saviola	River Plate	11

== Relegation table ==
Team	Average	Points	Played	1998–99	1999–00	2000-01
Boca Juniors	2.052	234	114	89	74	71
River Plate	1.947	222	114	58	86	78
San Lorenzo	1.815	211	114	61	69	81
Gimnasia y Esgrima (LP)	1.456	166	114	62	49	55
Huracán	1.447	87	76	32	N/A	55
Rosario Central	1.438	164	114	47	66	41
Talleres (C)	1.429	163	114	44	58	61
Vélez Sársfield	1.429	163	114	46	61	56
Newell's Old Boys	1.359	155	114	52	55	48
Independiente	1.350	154	114	51	61	42
Colón	1.342	153	114	49	55	49
Chacarita Juniors	1.328	101	76	N/A	45	56
Unión	1.315	150	114	54	50	46
Lanús	1.236	141	114	50	48	43
Estudiantes (LP)	1.228	140	114	45	39	56
Racing	1.228	140	114	55	45	40
Argentinos Juniors	1.149	131	114	49	39	43
Belgrano	1.052	120	114	44	39	37
Almagro	1.026	39	38	N/A	N/A	39
Los Andes	0.789	30	38	N/A	N/A	30

- Played the relegation playoff
- Relegated to Primera B Nacional

=== Promotion Playoffs ===
Belgrano (Córdoba) and Argentinos Juniors (3rd. and 4th. worst averages) played the promotion playoff v Quilmes and Instituto (C) (qualified from 2000–01 Primera B Nacional) respectively, in a two-legged series.

Although the two playoff series ended 1–1 on aggregate, Argentinos and Belgrano remained in the top division due to rules stated that in cases like those, teams in Primera División would be declared winners (sporting advantage).

* Winner of the series; teams currently playing in Primera División are listed first

Series	Team 1 (1st div)	Team 2 (2nd div)	1st. leg	Venue 1	City 1	2nd. leg	Venue 2	City 2	Agg.
1	Argentinos Jrs.	Instituto (C)	0–0	Presidente Perón	Córdoba	1–1	Ferro C. Oeste	Buenos Aires	1–1 (Note: Argentinos Juniors remained in Primera División because of a sporting advantage rule.)
2	Belgrano	Quilmes	1–0	Centenario	Quilmes	1–0	Gigante de Alberdi	Córdoba	1–1

== See also ==
- 2000–01 in Argentine football
