= 1955 Argentine Primera División =

64th season of top-tier football league in Argentina

Primera División
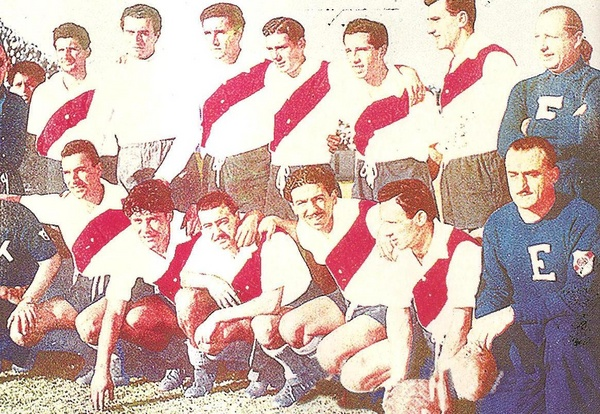
- River Plate, champions
- Season: 1955
- Champions: River Plate (12th title)
- Promoted: Estudiantes (LP)
- Relegated: Platense
- 1955 Copa Aldao: River Plate
- Top goalscorer: (Argentina) Oscar Massei (21 goals)

The 1955 Argentine Primera División was the 64th season of top-flight football in Argentina. The season began on April 30 and ended on December 11.

River Plate won the championship while Platense was relegated.

== League standings ==
Pos	Team	Pld	W	D	L	GF	GA	GD	Pts
1	River Plate	30	18	9	3	53	35	+18	45
2	Racing	30	14	10	6	50	32	+18	38
3	Boca Juniors	30	14	9	7	51	36	+15	37
4	Independiente	30	14	8	8	48	31	+17	36
5	Lanús	30	13	8	9	49	41	+8	34
6	Tigre	30	12	6	12	47	54	−7	30
7	Ferro Carril Oeste	30	10	9	11	39	43	−4	29
8	San Lorenzo	30	8	12	10	41	43	−2	28
9	Huracán	30	10	7	13	52	44	+8	27
9	Gimnasia y Esgrima (LP)	30	10	7	13	48	46	+2	27
9	Vélez Sársfield	30	11	5	14	39	55	−16	27
12	Chacarita Juniors	30	9	8	13	46	49	−3	26
13	Newell's Old Boys	30	8	9	13	42	55	−13	25
13	Estudiantes (LP)	30	9	7	14	39	52	−13	25
15	Rosario Central	30	9	6	15	46	57	−11	24
16	Platense	30	6	10	14	35	52	−17	22
