= 1917 Argentine Primera División =

26th season of top-tier football league in Argentina

Primera División
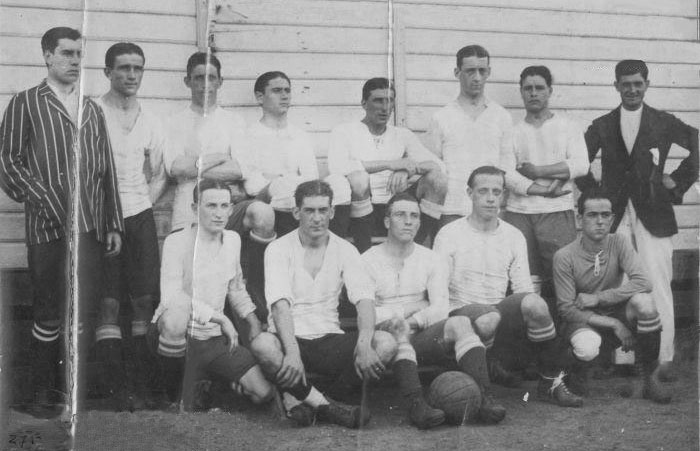
- Racing Club, champions
- Season: 1917
- Champions: Racing (5th title)
- Promoted: Sportivo Barracas
- Relegated: Gim. y Esg. (BA); Banfield
- 1917 Copa Aldao: Racing
- Top goalscorer: (Argentina) Alberto Marcovecchio (Racing) (18 goals)

The 1917 Argentine Primera División was the 26th season of top-flight football in Argentina. The season began on April 1, and ended on December 30.

Racing won its fifth consecutive league title. Sportivo Barracas made its debut in Primera División, while Gimnasia y Esgrima (BA) and Banfield were relegated at the end of the season.

== Final table ==
Pos	Team	Pld	W	D	L	GF	GA	GD	Pts
1	Racing (C)	20	16	3	1	58	4	+54	35
2	River Plate	20	12	6	2	35	14	+21	30
3	Huracán	20	11	6	3	42	15	+27	28
4	Boca Juniors	20	10	8	2	42	23	+19	28
5	Sportivo Barracas	20	6	9	5	25	22	+3	21
6	Estudiantes (LP)	20	8	5	7	28	28	0	21
7	Estudiantil Porteño	20	6	9	5	26	26	0	21
8	Independiente	20	7	6	7	29	24	+5	20
9	San Isidro	20	7	6	7	31	35	−4	20
10	Gimnasia y Esgrima (LP)	20	4	11	5	19	24	−5	19
11	Ferro Carril Oeste	20	6	7	7	18	24	−6	19
12	San Lorenzo	20	6	6	8	29	27	+2	18
13	Porteño	20	7	4	9	20	30	−10	18
14	Columbian	20	8	2	10	18	35	−17	18
15	Platense	20	4	9	7	21	26	−5	17
16	Atlanta	20	6	4	10	29	41	−12	16
17	Tigre	20	6	4	10	23	36	−13	16
18	Argentino (Q)	20	6	4	10	21	37	−16	16
19	Estudiantes (BA)	20	6	3	11	25	31	−6	15
20	Gimnasia y Esgrima (BA) (R)	20	4	4	12	23	44	−21	12
21	Banfield (R)	20	4	4	12	17	33	−16	12

(C) Champions; (R) Relegated
