= 1941 Argentine Primera División =

50th season of top-tier football league in Argentina

Primera División
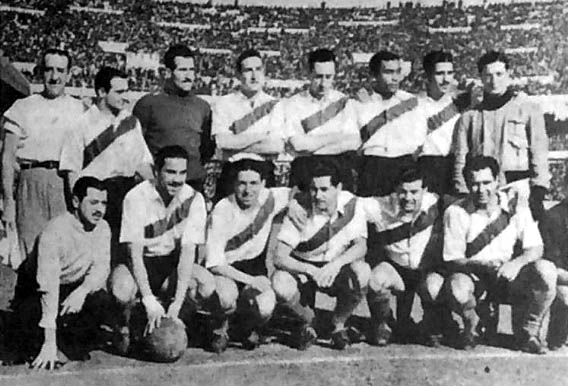
- River Plate, champions
- Season: 1941
- Champions: River Plate (6th title)
- Promoted: (none)
- Relegated: Rosario Central
- 1941 Copa Aldao: River Plate
- Top goalscorer: (Argentina) José Canteli (Newell's) (30 goals)

The 1941 Argentine Primera División was the 50th season of top-flight football in Argentina. The season began on March 30 and ended on November 15. The number of teams was reduced from 18 to 16.

== League standings ==
Pos	Team	Pld	W	D	L	GF	GA	GD	Pts
1	River Plate	30	19	6	5	75	35	+40	44
2	San Lorenzo	30	17	6	7	67	46	+21	40
3	Newell's Old Boys	30	17	4	9	78	50	+28	38
4	Boca Juniors	30	16	4	10	61	52	+9	36
5	Independiente	30	15	4	11	67	53	+14	34
5	Huracán	30	14	6	10	57	48	+9	34
7	Racing	30	15	3	12	64	54	+10	33
8	Estudiantes (LP)	30	13	6	11	77	64	+13	32
9	Ferro Carril Oeste	30	13	4	13	44	54	−10	30
10	Tigre	30	9	9	12	47	54	−7	27
11	Atlanta	30	8	10	12	59	73	−14	26
12	Gimnasia y Esgrima (LP)	30	8	4	18	50	73	−23	20
13	Platense	30	6	7	17	49	68	−19	19
14	Lanús	30	6	6	18	59	95	−36	18
15	Banfield	30	15	3	12	67	68	−1	17 (Note: 16 points deducted due to bribery in round 10)
16	Rosario Central	30	6	4	20	42	76	−34	16
