= 1918 Argentine Primera División =

27th season of top-tier football league in Argentina

Primera División
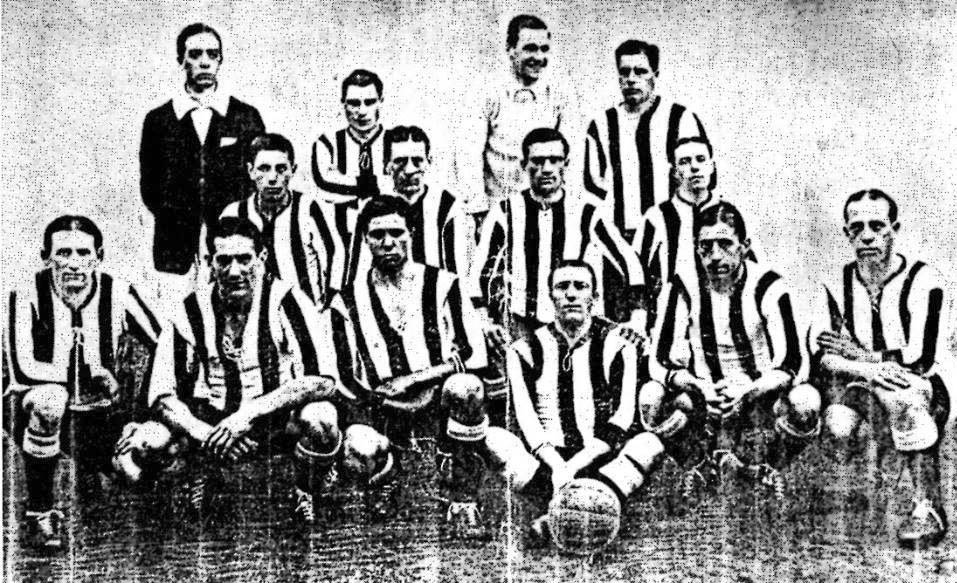
- Racing Club, champions
- Season: 1918
- Dates: 7 April – 17 November
- Champions: Racing (6th title)
- Promoted: Defensores de Belgrano
- Relegated: Argentino de Quilmes; Ferro Carril Oeste
- 1918 Copa Aldao: Racing
- Top goalscorer: (Argentina) Albérico Zabaleta (Racing) (13 goals)

The 1918 Argentine Primera División was the 27th season of top-flight football in Argentina. The season began on April 7 and ended on November 17.

Racing won its 6th. consecutive league title, remaining unbeaten at the end of the season. Defensores de Belgrano debuted in Primera after promoting last year, while Argentino (Q) and Ferro Carril Oeste (which was also expelled from the Association) were relegated.

== Final table ==
Pos	Team	Pld	W	D	L	GF	GA	GD	Pts
1	Racing (C)	19	17	2	0	49	9	+40	36
2	River Plate	19	9	7	3	30	17	+13	25
3	Boca Juniors	19	9	6	4	39	21	+18	24
4	San Isidro	19	10	4	5	35	23	+12	24
5	Sportivo Barracas	19	9	3	7	22	21	+1	21
6	Gimnasia y Esgrima (LP)	19	7	6	6	21	22	−1	20
7	Estudiantes (LP)	19	7	6	6	19	25	−6	20
8	Huracán	19	5	9	5	25	19	+6	19
9	Independiente	19	8	2	9	30	28	+2	18
10	Estudiantil Porteño	19	6	6	7	23	22	+1	18
11	Porteño	19	7	4	8	21	29	−8	18
12	Platense	19	7	4	8	14	22	−8	18
13	San Lorenzo	19	6	5	8	20	23	−3	17
14	Tigre	19	7	3	9	27	32	−5	17
15	Estudiantes (BA)	19	5	7	7	26	31	−5	17
16	Defensores de Belgrano	19	6	5	8	24	32	−8	17
17	Atlanta	19	5	6	8	25	34	−9	16
18	Columbian	19	5	5	9	20	27	−7	15
19	Ferro Carril Oeste (R)	19	2	9	8	9	23	−14	13
20	Argentino (Q) (R)	19	1	5	13	9	28	−19	7

(C) Champions; (R) Relegated
