= 1921 Argentine Primera División =

30th season of top-tier football league in Argentina

Primera División
- Season: 1921
- Dates: 3 April 1921 – 8 January 1922
- Champions: Huracán (AFA); Racing (AAmF)

The 1921 Argentine Primera División was the 30th season of top-flight football in Argentina. Huracán won its first AFA league title while Racing won the dissident Asociación Amateur championship.

== Final tables ==
=== Asociación Argentina de Football - Copa Campeonato ===
Primera División (AFA)
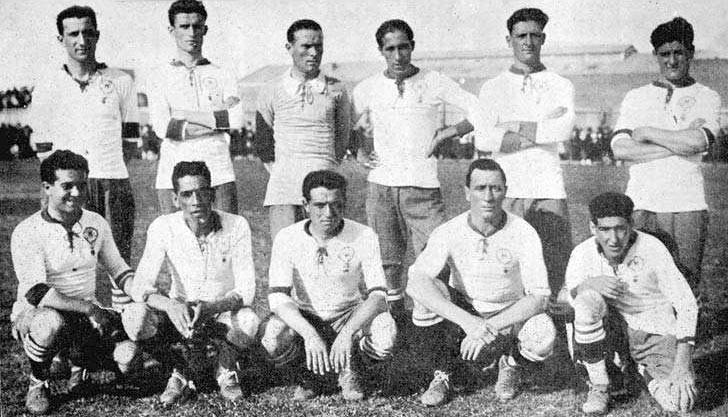
- Huracán, AFA champions
- Season: 1921
- Dates: 3 April 1921 – 8 January 1922
- Champions: Huracán (1st title)
- Promoted: El Porvenir; Platense (Retiro)
- Top goalscorer: (Argentina) Guillermo Dannaher (23 goals)

Banfield disaffiliated from the association moving to the rival Asociación Amateurs de Football with a few fixtures disputed.

Pos	Team	Pld	W	D	L	GF	GA	GD	Pts
1	Huracán (C)	18	14	3	1	54	15	+39	31
2	Del Plata	18	12	4	2	27	11	+16	28
3	Boca Juniors	18	10	5	3	30	17	+13	25
4	Nueva Chicago	18	6	7	5	13	12	+1	19
5	El Porvenir	18	6	7	5	17	22	−5	19
6	Sportivo del Norte	18	4	8	6	17	22	−5	16
7	Sportivo Barracas	18	5	4	9	22	31	−9	14
8	Estudiantes (LP)	18	5	3	10	17	34	−17	13
9	Sportivo Palermo	18	3	4	11	14	28	−14	10
10	Porteño	18	0	5	13	10	29	−19	5
11	~~Platense (Retiro)~~ (Note: The 6 matches played by the team were annulled after it retired from the competition.)	0	0	0	0	0	0	0	0

(C) Champions

=== Asociación Amateurs de Football ===
Primera División (AAmF)
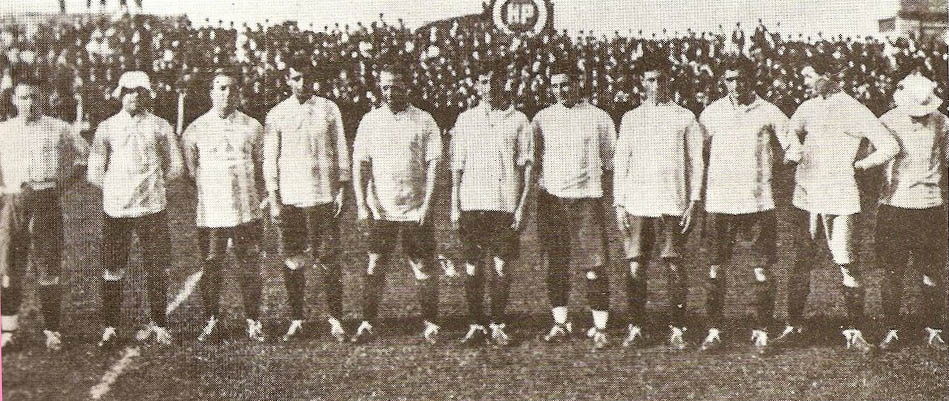
- Racing Club, AAmF champions
- Season: 1921
- Dates: 3 April 1921 – 8 January 1922
- Champions: Racing (8th title)
- Promoted: Palermo
- Relegated: (none)
- Top goalscorer: (Argentina) Alberico Zabaleta (32 goals)

Racing Club won its 8th title. General Mitre, which had debuted at Primera after promoting last year, was expelled from the association after playing 17 fixtures and all its matches annulled.

Pos	Team	Pld	W	D	L	GF	GA	GD	Pts
1	Racing (C)	38	30	6	2	73	16	+57	66
2	River Plate	38	25	4	9	69	30	+39	54
3	Independiente	38	22	9	7	62	28	+34	53
4	Gimnasia y Esgrima (LP)	38	23	6	9	64	39	+25	52
5	Defensores de Belgrano	38	20	8	10	42	28	+14	48
6	San Lorenzo	38	20	7	11	47	25	+22	47
7	Tigre	38	15	13	10	61	53	+8	43
8	Platense	38	16	10	12	63	38	+25	42
9	Atlanta	38	17	7	14	47	44	+3	41
10	Banfield	38	16	6	16	47	43	+4	38
11	Barracas Central	38	15	7	16	47	47	0	37
12	Vélez Sarsfield	38	13	10	15	53	43	+10	36
13	Sportivo Almagro	38	14	6	18	40	54	−14	34
14	Estudiantes (BA)	38	12	8	18	38	57	−19	32
15	Lanús	38	10	8	20	33	60	−27	28
16	Sportivo Buenos Aires	38	8	11	19	38	62	−24	27
17	Quilmes	38	8	9	21	43	65	−22	25
18	Estudiantil Porteño	38	9	6	23	38	58	−20	24
19	San Isidro	38	8	6	24	33	78	−45	22
20	Ferro Carril Oeste	38	2	7	29	22	92	−70	11

(C) Champions
