= 1957 Argentine Primera División =

66th season of top-tier football league in Argentina

Primera División
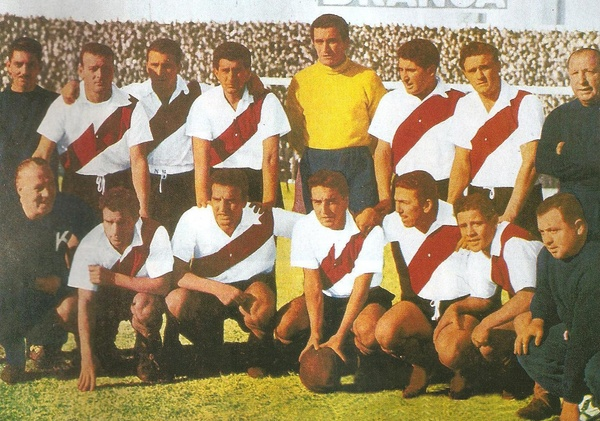
- River Plate, champion
- Season: 1957
- Champions: River Plate (14th title)
- Promoted: Atlanta
- Relegated: Ferro C. Oeste
- 1957 Copa Aldao: River Plate
- Top goalscorer: (Argentina) Roberto Zárate (22 goals)

The 1957 Argentine Primera División was the 66th season of top-flight football in Argentina. The season began on May 5 and ended on December 14.

River Plate achieved its 13th league title.

== League standings ==
Pos	Team	Pld	W	D	L	GF	GA	GD	Pts
1	River Plate	30	19	8	3	75	34	+41	46
2	San Lorenzo	30	15	8	7	66	42	+24	38
3	Racing	30	15	6	9	59	41	+18	36
4	Boca Juniors	30	13	8	9	45	34	+11	34
4	Vélez Sársfield	30	12	10	8	42	43	−1	34
6	Huracán	30	14	5	11	46	39	+7	33
6	Estudiantes (LP)	30	12	9	9	46	50	−4	33
8	Independiente	30	11	9	10	35	31	+4	31
8	Newell's Old Boys	30	11	9	10	38	39	−1	31
10	Argentinos Juniors	30	9	10	11	49	57	−8	28
11	Rosario Central	30	10	7	13	40	37	+3	27
12	Atlanta	30	7	10	13	37	53	−16	24
13	Tigre	30	8	7	15	37	49	−12	23
13	Gimnasia y Esgrima (LP)	30	8	7	15	37	62	−25	23
15	Lanús	30	7	8	15	44	57	−13	22
16	Ferro Carril Oeste	30	6	5	19	33	61	−28	17
