= 1950 Argentine Primera División =

59th season of top-tier football league in Argentina

Primera División
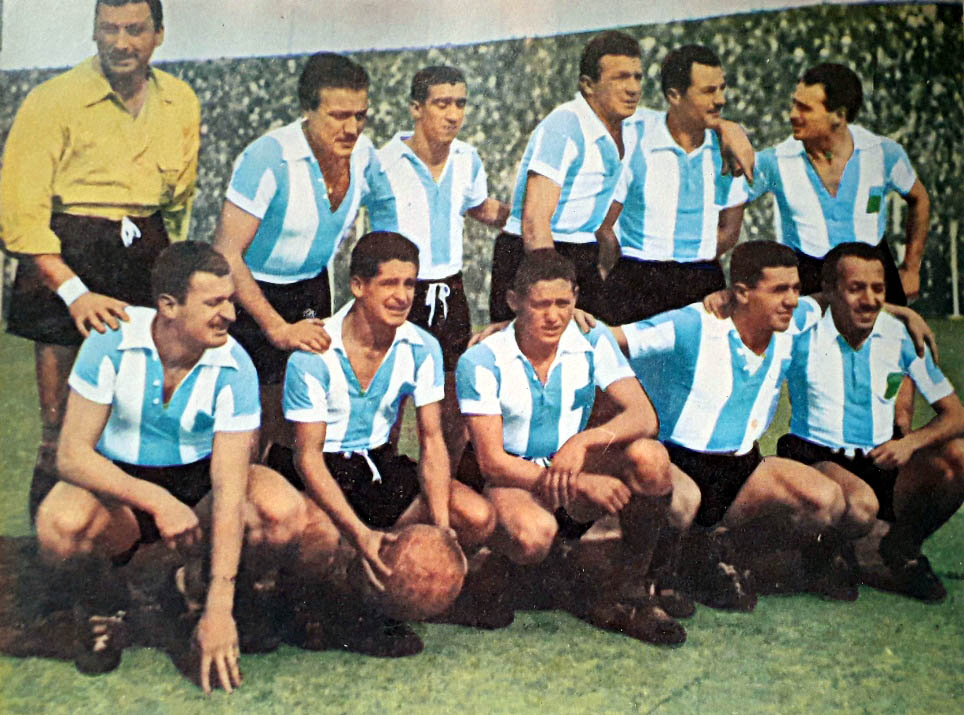
- Racing Club, champion
- Season: 1950
- Champions: Racing (11th title)
- Promoted: Quilmes
- Relegated: Rosario Central; Tigre
- Top goalscorer: (Argentina) Mario Papa (24 goals)

The 1950 Argentine Primera División was the 59th season of top-flight football in Argentina. The season began on April 2 and ended on December 10.

Quilmes returned to Primera while Rosario Central and Tigre were relegated. Racing Club won its 11th league title.

== League standings ==
Pos	Team	Pld	W	D	L	GF	GA	GD	Pts
1	Racing	34	23	1	10	86	48	+38	47
2	Boca Juniors	34	15	9	10	59	46	+13	39
2	Independiente	34	18	3	13	69	55	+14	39
4	River Plate	34	15	8	11	68	57	+11	38
5	San Lorenzo	34	15	7	12	77	60	+17	37
6	Estudiantes (LP)	34	14	8	12	57	61	−4	36
7	Banfield	34	12	11	11	60	51	+9	35
8	Chacarita Juniors	34	13	8	13	54	54	0	34
8	Platense	34	11	12	11	66	74	−8	34
10	Vélez Sársfield	34	14	5	15	47	58	−11	33
11	Newell's Old Boys	34	13	6	15	58	53	+5	32
11	Gimnasia y Esgrima (LP)	34	11	10	13	59	56	+3	32
11	Ferro Carril Oeste	34	10	12	12	53	60	−7	32
14	Atlanta	34	12	7	15	58	73	−15	31
15	Quilmes	34	11	8	15	57	65	−8	30
16	Huracán	34	12	5	17	54	65	−11	29
16	Tigre	34	10	9	15	51	79	−28	29
18	Rosario Central	34	9	7	18	52	70	−18	25
