= 1958 Argentine Primera División =

67th season of top-tier football league in Argentina

Primera División
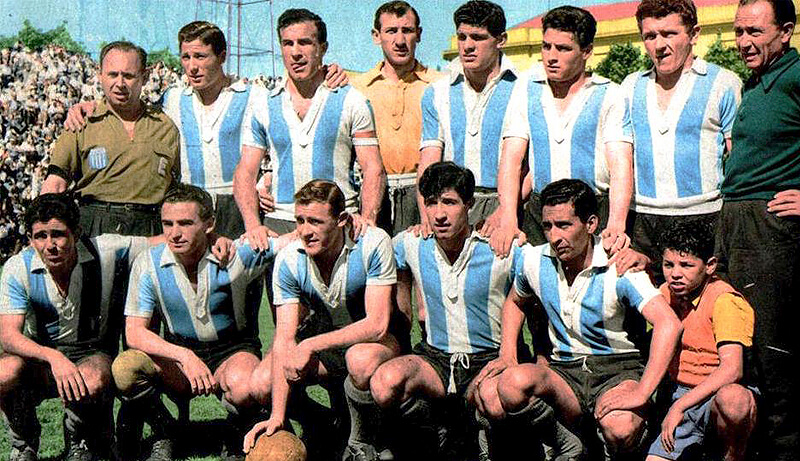
- Racing Club, champions
- Season: 1958
- Champions: Racing (13th title)
- Promoted: Central Córdoba (R)
- Relegated: Tigre
- Top goalscorer: (Argentina) José Sanfilippo (28 goals)

The 1958 Argentine Primera División was the 67th season of top-flight football in Argentina. The season extended for over a year, beginning on March 23, 1958, and finishing on April 26, 1959.

Racing won its 13th title in Primera.

== League standings ==
Pos	Team	Pld	W	D	L	GF	GA	GD	Pts
1	Racing	30	16	9	5	69	38	+31	41
2	Boca Juniors	30	14	10	6	70	48	+22	38
2	San Lorenzo	30	16	6	8	66	47	+19	38
4	Atlanta	30	14	8	8	47	33	+14	36
5	River Plate	30	14	9	7	62	45	+17	37
5	Rosario Central	30	13	9	8	50	43	+7	35
7	Vélez Sársfield	30	13	8	9	50	47	+3	34
8	Independiente	30	11	11	8	58	47	+11	33
9	Estudiantes (LP)	30	13	5	12	60	56	+4	31
10	Huracán	30	12	3	15	46	51	−5	27
10	Central Córdoba (R)	30	12	3	15	57	65	−8	27
12	Argentinos Juniors	30	8	9	13	58	68	−10	25
12	Lanús	30	8	9	13	58	70	−12	25
14	Gimnasia y Esgrima (LP)	30	7	10	13	55	68	−13	24
15	Newell's Old Boys	30	4	9	17	29	56	−27	17
16	Tigre	30	4	4	22	29	82	−53	12
