= 1966 Argentine Primera División =

75th season of top-tier football league in Argentina

Primera División
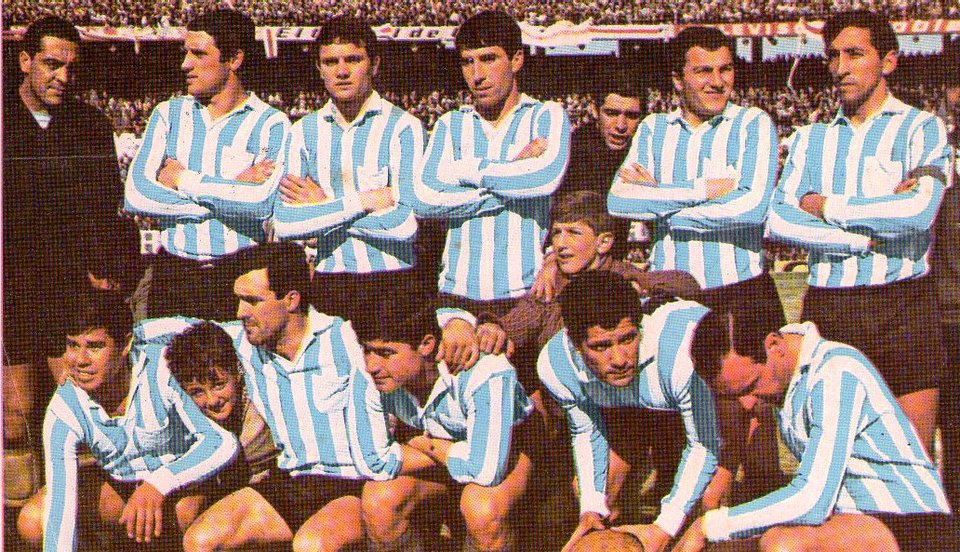
- Racing Club, champions
- Season: 1966
- Champions: Racing Club (15th title)
- Promoted: Colón (SF); Quilmes
- Relegated: (none)
- 1967 Copa Libertadores: Racing Club; River Plate
- Top goalscorer: (Argentina) Luis Artime (23 goals)

The 1966 Argentine Primera División was the 75th season of top-flight football in Argentina. The season began on March 6 and ended on December 6.

Racing Club won the championship (15th title) with no teams relegated.

== League standings ==
Pos	Team	Pld	W	D	L	GF	GA	GD	Pts
1	Racing	38	24	13	1	70	24	+46	61
2	River Plate	38	22	12	4	66	26	+40	56
3	Boca Juniors	38	17	14	7	51	32	+19	48
4	San Lorenzo	38	17	12	9	48	34	+14	46
5	Vélez Sarsfield	38	15	16	7	49	38	+11	46
6	Independiente	38	14	16	8	54	34	+20	44
7	Estudiantes (LP)	38	12	17	9	44	37	+7	41
8	Gimnasia y Esgrima (LP)	38	13	13	12	49	41	+8	39
9	Argentinos Juniors	38	14	11	13	40	44	−4	39
10	Atlanta	38	10	18	10	45	39	+6	38
11	Newell's Old Boys	38	14	10	14	45	51	−6	38
12	Rosario Central	38	10	17	11	31	30	+1	37
13	Banfield	38	13	11	14	45	48	−3	37
14	Lanús	38	9	13	16	43	55	−12	31
15	Huracán	38	10	9	19	41	62	−21	29
16	Colón	38	8	11	19	30	53	−23	27
17	Platense	38	6	15	17	25	51	−26	27
18	Ferro Carril Oeste	38	9	9	20	37	64	−27	27
19	Quilmes	38	8	10	20	39	59	−20	26
20	Chacarita Juniors	38	5	13	20	36	66	−30	23
