= 1951 Argentine Primera División =

60th season of top-tier football league in Argentina

Primera División
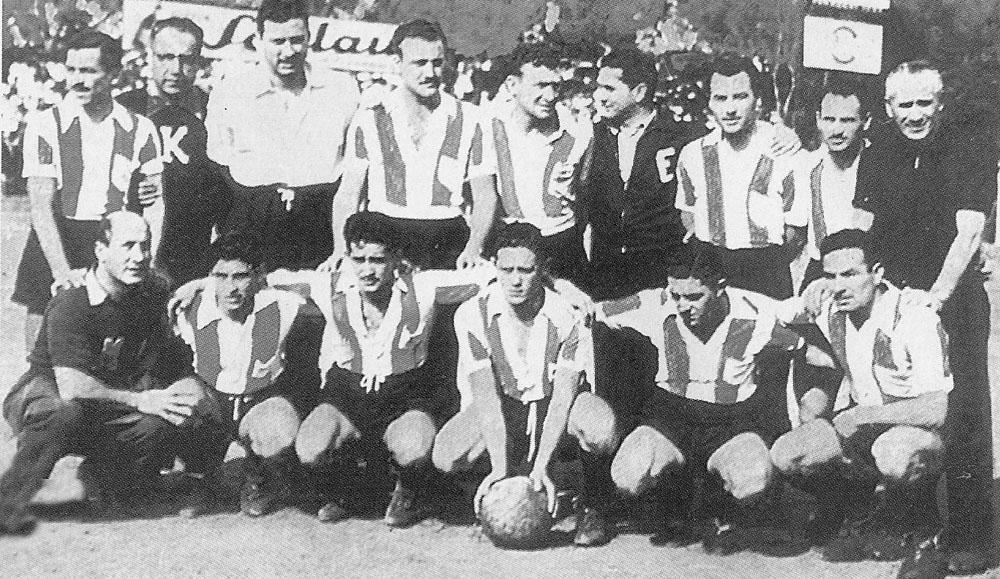
- Racing Club, champions
- Season: 1951
- Champions: Racing (12th title)
- Promoted: Lanús
- Relegated: Quilmes; Gimnasia y Esgrima (LP)
- Top goalscorer: (Argentina) Santiago Vernazza (22 goals)

The 1951 Argentine Primera División was the 60th season of top-flight football in Argentina. The season began on April 15 and ended on December 5. Lanús promoted to Primera División as champion of Primera B

Banfield and Racing shared the 1st position at the end of the tournament so a two-game playoff match was held to decide a champion. Racing won the series winning their 12th league title (and third consecutive).

On the other hand, Quilmes and Gimnasia y Esgrima (LP) were relegated.

== League standings ==
Pos	Team	Pld	W	D	L	GF	GA	GD	Pts	Qualification or relegation
1	Banfield	32	17	10	5	63	33	+30	44	Championship playoff
2	Racing	32	16	12	4	60	37	+23	44	Championship playoff
3	River Plate	32	16	11	5	69	42	+27	43	
4	Independiente	32	16	7	9	74	51	+23	39	
5	Lanús	32	14	9	9	62	49	+13	37	
6	Boca Juniors	32	11	13	8	46	38	+8	35	
7	San Lorenzo	32	13	9	10	46	41	+5	35	
8	Chacarita Juniors	32	12	9	11	58	55	+3	33	
9	Vélez Sársfield	32	10	13	9	57	58	−1	33	
10	Estudiantes (LP)	32	11	7	14	65	55	+10	29	
11	Newell's Old Boys	32	10	8	14	40	58	−18	28	
12	Ferro Carril Oeste	32	8	11	13	50	55	−5	27	
13	Platense	32	9	7	16	51	64	−13	25	
14	Huracán	32	6	12	14	44	59	−15	24	
15	Atlanta	32	8	8	16	46	79	−33	24	
16	Quilmes	32	7	9	16	52	79	−27	23	Relegated
17	Gimnasia y Esgrima (LP)	32	4	13	15	41	71	−30	21	Relegated

== Championship Playoff ==
After finishing 1st in the table (with no goal difference considered), both teams, Banfield and Racing had to play a two-legged series to decide a champion.

Team 1	Team 2	1st. leg	Venue 1	City 1	2nd. leg	Venue 2	City 2	Agg.
Racing	Banfield	0–0	San Lorenzo	Buenos Aires	1–0	San Lorenzo	Buenos Aires	1–0
