= 1998–99 Argentine Primera División =

108th season of top-tier football league in Argentina

Primera División
- Season: 1998–99
- Dates: August 7, 1998 – June 21, 1999
- Champions: Apertura: Boca Juniors (23rd title); Clausura: Boca Juniors (24th title)
- 2000 Copa Libertadores: Boca Juniors; River Plate
- 1999 Copa Conmebol: Gimnasia y Esg LP; Rosario Central
- Matches: 380

The 1998–99 Argentine Primera División was the 108th season of top-flight football in Argentina. The season ran from August 7, 1998, to June 21, 1999. Both main clubs from Córdoba, Talleres (champion of 1997–98 Primera B Nacional) and Belgrano (winner of "Torneo Reducido", after beating Aldosivi in a two-legged series) were promoted from Primera B Nacional.

Boca Juniors won both, Apertura and Clausura championships (a total of 24 league titles to date), while Platense and Huracán were relegated with the worst points averages.

== Torneo Apertura ==
Apertura
- Season: 1998
- Dates: 7 August – 14 December
- Champions: Boca Juniors (23rd title)
- Promoted: Talleres (C); Belgrano (C)
- Top goalscorer: (Argentina) Martín Palermo (20)
- Biggest home win: Boca Jrs. 6–2 Huracán (6 Sep)
- Biggest away win: Argentinos 1–5 San Lorenzo (11 Sep)
- Highest scoring: Unión 3–6 San Lorenzo (18 Oct)

=== League standings ===
Pos	Team	Pld	W	D	L	GF	GA	GD	Pts
1	Boca Juniors	19	13	6	0	45	18	+27	45
2	Gimnasia y Esgrima (LP)	19	10	6	3	31	23	+8	36
3	Racing	19	9	6	4	39	29	+10	33
4	Lanús	19	8	6	5	20	20	0	30
5	Colón	19	7	5	7	28	27	+1	26
6	San Lorenzo	19	6	7	6	40	35	+5	25
7	Argentinos Juniors	19	5	10	4	31	27	+4	25
8	Newell's Old Boys	19	6	7	6	22	21	+1	25
9	Unión	19	6	7	6	32	34	−2	25
10	Rosario Central	19	6	7	6	26	28	−2	25
11	Vélez Sársfield	19	6	6	7	26	26	0	24
12	Estudiantes (LP)	19	6	6	7	22	23	−1	24
13	Talleres (C)	19	7	3	9	28	33	−5	24
14	Gimnasia y Esgrima (J)	19	4	10	5	31	30	+1	22
15	River Plate	19	5	7	7	27	27	0	22
16	Independiente	19	5	5	9	26	26	0	20
17	Ferro Carril Oeste	19	5	5	9	24	31	−7	20
18	Huracán	19	5	5	9	29	42	−13	20
19	Belgrano	19	4	7	8	22	31	−9	19
20	Platense	19	3	4	12	21	39	−18	13

=== Top scorers ===
Rank.	Player	Team	Goals
1	(Argentina) Martín Palermo	Boca Juniors	20
2	(Paraguay) Hugo Brizuela	Argentinos Juniors	13
3	(Argentina) Jorge Quinteros	Argentinos Juniors	10

== Torneo Clausura ==
Clausura
- Season: 1999
- Dates: 5 March – 21 June
- Champions: Boca Juniors (24th title)
- Relegated: Platense; Huracán
- Top goalscorer: (Argentina) José Luis Calderón (17)
- Biggest home win: Boca 4–0 Racing (18 Apr); Newell's 4–0 Huracán (24 Apr); Vélez 4–0 Newell's (28 May); Independiente 4–0 Boca Jrs. (6 Jun); San Lorenzo 4–0 Racing (20 Jun)

=== League standings ===
Pos	Team	Pld	W	D	L	GF	GA	GD	Pts
1	Boca Juniors	19	13	5	1	35	11	+24	44
2	River Plate	19	11	4	4	37	19	+18	37
3	San Lorenzo	19	10	6	3	33	19	+14	36
4	Rosario Central	19	9	5	5	24	20	+4	32
5	Independiente	19	8	5	6	32	26	+6	29
6	Unión	19	8	5	6	29	27	+2	29
7	Newell's Old Boys	19	7	6	6	30	22	+8	27
8	Gimnasia y Esgrima (LP)	19	7	5	7	28	32	−4	26
9	Belgrano	19	6	7	6	20	20	0	25
10	Gimnasia y Esgrima (J)	19	7	4	8	28	37	−9	25
11	Argentinos Juniors	19	6	6	7	20	23	−3	24
12	Colón	19	6	8	5	28	22	+6	23 (Note: 3 points deducted)
13	Vélez Sársfield	19	5	7	7	21	24	−3	22
14	Racing	19	6	4	9	20	32	−12	22
15	Estudiantes (LP)	19	4	9	6	18	18	0	21
16	Talleres (C)	19	4	8	7	23	26	−3	20
17	Lanús	19	5	5	9	23	28	−5	20
18	Platense	19	4	5	10	16	30	−14	17
19	Ferro Carril Oeste	19	2	9	8	8	18	−10	15
20	Huracán	19	2	6	11	15	35	−20	12

=== Top scorers ===
Rank	Player	Team	Goals
1	(Argentina) José Luis Calderón	Independiente	17
2	(Argentina) Bernardo Romeo	San Lorenzo	13
3	(Argentina) Martín Palermo	Boca Juniors	12

== Relegation ==
Team	Average	Points	Played	1996–97	1997–98	1998–99
River Plate	1.929	220	114	87	74	58
Boca Juniors	1.859	212	114	50	73	89
Gimnasia y Esgrima (LP)	1.587	181	114	50	69	62
San Lorenzo	1.578	180	114	57	62	61
Vélez Sársfield	1.570	179	114	55	78	46
Independiente	1.561	178	114	71	56	51
Lanús	1.543	176	114	61	65	50
Rosario Central	1.412	161	114	49	57	47
Argentinos Juniors	1.394	106	76	N/A	57	49
Newell's Old Boys	1.360	155	114	61	42	52
Racing	1.360	155	114	59	41	55
Colón	1.298	148	114	61	38	49
Estudiantes (LP)	1.210	138	114	39	49	45
Gimnasia y Esgrima (J)	1.210	138	114	39	52	47
Talleres (C)	1.158	44	38	N/A	N/A	44
Belgrano	1.158	44	38	N/A	N/A	44
Unión	1.149	131	114	44	33	54
Ferro Carril Oeste	1.140	130	114	46	39	35
Platense	1.105	126	114	47	49	30
Huracán	0.850	97	114	38	27	32

== Aggregate standings ==
Pos	Team	Pld	W	D	L	GF	GA	GD	Pts
1	Boca Juniors	38	26	11	1	80	29	+51	89
2	Gimnasia y Esgrima (LP)	38	17	11	10	59	55	+4	62
3	San Lorenzo	38	16	13	9	73	54	+19	61
4	River Plate	38	16	11	11	64	46	+18	59
5	Rosario Central	38	15	12	11	50	48	+2	57
6	Racing	38	15	10	13	59	61	−2	55
7	Unión	38	14	12	12	61	61	0	54
8	Newell's Old Boys	38	13	13	12	52	43	+9	52
9	Lanús	38	13	11	14	43	48	−5	50
10	Colón	38	13	13	12	56	49	+7	49 (Note: 3 points deducted in Torneo Clausura)
11	Independiente	38	13	10	15	58	52	+6	49
12	Argentinos Juniors	38	11	16	11	51	50	+1	49
13	Gimnasia y Esgrima (J)	38	11	14	13	59	67	−8	47
14	Vélez Sársfield	38	11	13	14	47	50	−3	46
15	Estudiantes (LP)	38	10	15	13	40	41	−1	45
16	Talleres (C)	38	11	11	16	51	59	−8	44
17	Belgrano	38	10	14	14	42	51	−9	44
18	Ferro Carril Oeste	38	7	14	17	32	49	−17	35
19	Huracán	38	7	11	20	44	77	−33	32
20	Platense	38	7	9	22	37	69	−32	30

== See also ==
- 1998–99 in Argentine football
