= 1960 Argentine Primera División =

69th season of top-tier football league in Argentina

Primera División
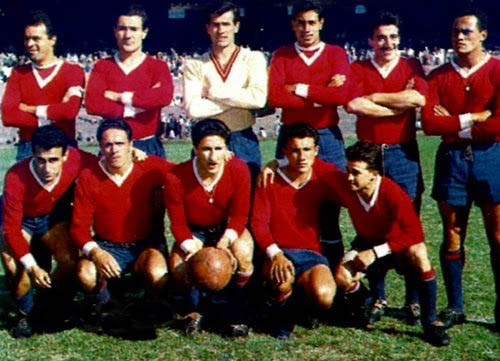
- Independiente, champion
- Season: 1960
- Champions: Independiente (6th title)
- Promoted: Chacarita Juniors
- Relegated: Newell's Old Boys
- 1961 Copa Libertadores: Independiente
- Top goalscorer: (Argentina) José Sanfilippo (34 goals)

The 1960 Argentine Primera División was the 69th season of top-flight football in Argentina. The season began on April 3 and ended on November 27.

Independiente achieved its 6th title while Newell's Old Boys was relegated to Primera B.

== League standings ==
Pos	Team	Pld	W	D	L	GF	GA	GD	Pts
1	Independiente	30	17	7	6	49	33	+16	41
2	River Plate	30	16	7	7	46	29	+17	39
2	Argentinos Juniors	30	15	9	6	68	48	+20	39
4	Racing	30	14	9	7	72	43	+29	37
4	Boca Juniors	30	13	11	6	58	36	+22	37
6	San Lorenzo	30	14	8	8	71	45	+26	36
7	Vélez Sársfield	30	12	9	9	48	46	+2	33
8	Rosario Central	30	10	9	11	55	71	−16	29
9	Huracán	30	10	8	12	48	45	+3	28
9	Chacarita Juniors	30	9	10	11	50	53	−3	28
11	Atlanta	30	8	11	11	49	56	−7	27
12	Gimnasia y Esgrima (LP)	30	9	7	14	50	60	−10	25
13	Estudiantes (LP)	30	9	5	16	44	69	−25	23
14	Lanús	30	5	11	14	38	54	−16	21
15	Ferro Carril Oeste	30	5	9	16	28	58	−30	19
16	Newell's Old Boys	30	6	6	18	38	66	−28	18
