= Argentina–United Kingdom relations =

- United Kingdom: Argentina

Foreign relations between the Argentine Republic and the United Kingdom of Great Britain and Northern Ireland have existed for over two centuries. The countries established diplomatic relations on 15 December 1823. During the period of the Argentine economic boom, from the 1860s to 1930s, the United Kingdom played a dominant role in the Argentine economy, with heavy investments in public utilities, railroads, banking and finance, insurance, shipping, communications, the meat industry, and retail trade. The community of English, Scottish, and Welsh Argentines was the largest of any country outside the British Empire, leading to the popular name of the "Sixth Dominion". Trade ties were hindered by the Great Depression and the imposition of Imperial Preference, and the Perón regime nationalized many British-owned industries, leading to Britain losing its position of economic paramountcy, although ties remained generally friendly.

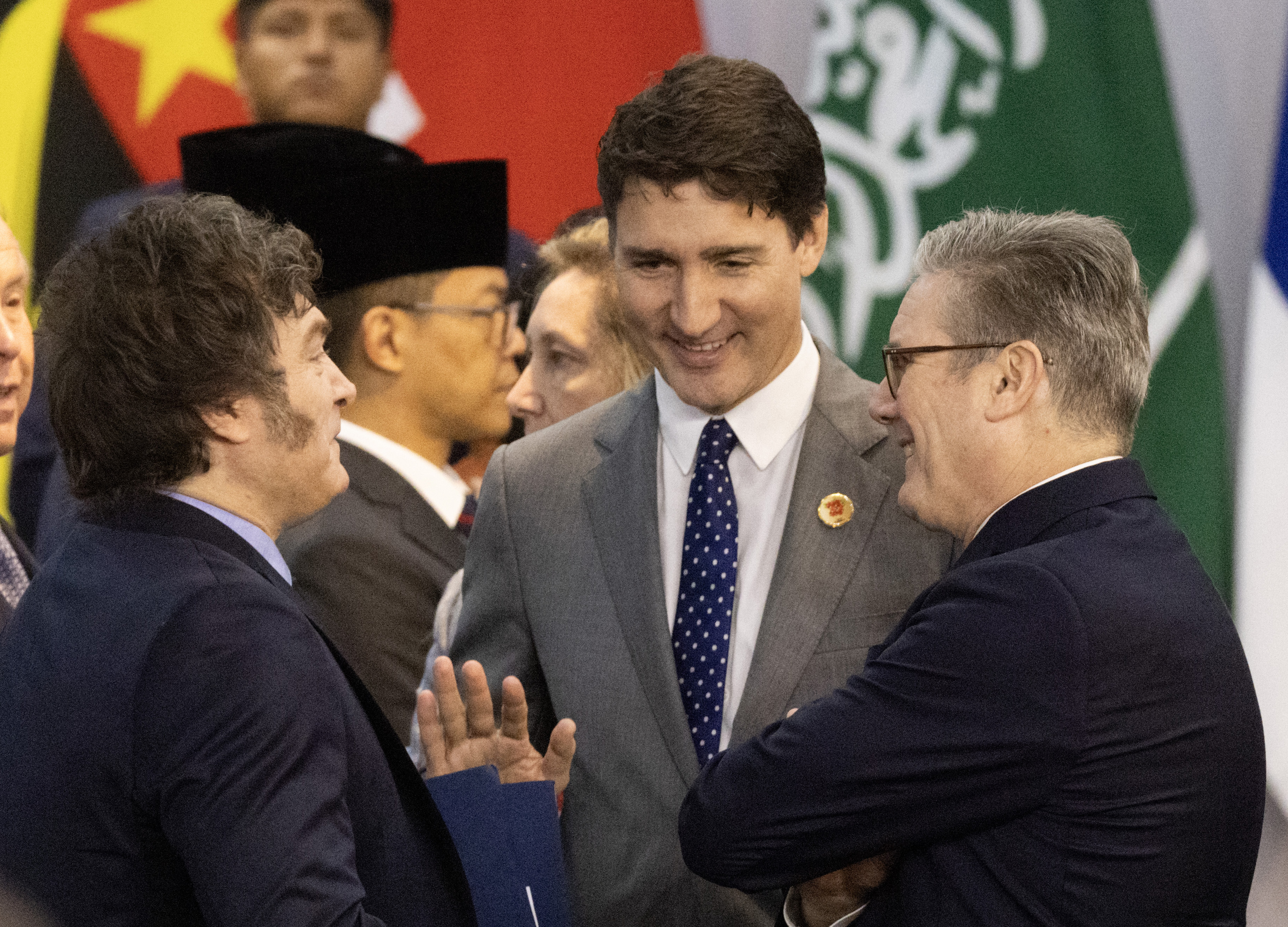
Argentine President Javier Milei with Canadian Prime Minister Justin Trudeau and British Prime Minister Keir Starmer at the 2024 G20 summit in Rio de Janeiro

Diplomatic relations were cut off before the Falklands War in 1982 and were reinstated in 1989. Post-war relations between the two countries improved significantly up until the mid-2000s. During the government of Cristina Fernández de Kirchner, relations became increasingly tense, with Argentina reasserting their claims to the Falkland Islands. In 2016, British prime minister David Cameron and Argentine President Mauricio Macri held a meeting where they agreed to begin a new stage of dialogue and friendship between the two countries and reaffirming the strong relationship the two countries have historically. Argentina later withdrew from this agreement in 2023.

Argentina has an embassy in London and the United Kingdom has an embassy in Buenos Aires. The current British Ambassador to Argentina is David Cairns and the current Argentine Ambassador to the United Kingdom is Mariana Plaza. Both states are members of the G20.

== Country comparison ==
	Argentina	United Kingdom
Population	46,044,703 (2022)	68,138,484 (2022)
Area	2,780,400 km^{2} (1,073,500 mi^{2})	242,495 km^{2} (93,628 mi^{2})
Population density	14.4/km^{2}	255.6/km^{2}
Capital and largest city	Buenos Aires	London
Population of capital (metropolitan area)	12,801,365	13,879,757
Government	Federal presidential constitutional republic	Unitary parliamentary constitutional monarchy
Legal system	Civil law	Common law
Official languages	Spanish	English (de facto)
Main religions	Christians 85.5%, Atheists and Agnostics 11.3%, Jehovah's Witnesses 1.2%, Mormons 0.9%, Islam, Judaism and Buddhism 1.2%.	Christians 71.6%, Islam 2.8%, Hinduism 1.0%, Sikhism 0.6%, Judaism 0.5%, Buddhism 0.3%, Other religions 0.3%
Ethnic groups	97% White/Mixed, 2.9% Native, 0.4% Black.	87.1% White British, 7.0% Asian, 3.0% Black, 2.0% Mixed, 0.9% others.
GDP (PPP)	$1.207 trillion (2022)	$3.776 trillion (2022)
Literacy rate	98.9	99.0
Human Development Index	0.825 (Very High)	0.922 (Very High)
Driving side	Right	Left

== History ==
=== Colonial era ===
British invasions of the Río de la Plata.

The modern territory of Argentina was initially part of the Spanish Empire. The Falkland Islands sovereignty dispute was initially a dispute of Spain and Britain, with events such as the Falklands Crisis of 1770. Spain allied with France against Britain during the Napoleonic Wars, so Britain launched two British invasions of the Río de la Plata. The first invasion in 1806 captured Buenos Aires. However the city was soon liberated by Santiago de Liniers with forces from Montevideo. A second invasion in 1807 took Montevideo, but failed to capture Buenos Aires a second time, and Montevideo was returned to Spain during the surrender. France attacked Spain (starting the Peninsular War in Europe) and Spain allied with Britain, so the British made no further attacks at the Río de la Plata.

The Peninsular War, the social changes caused by the huge militarization of the people of Buenos Aires and other local and international influences led to the May Revolution, which began the Argentine War of Independence. Britain stayed neutral during the conflict, and accepted the Argentine Declaration of Independence on 15 December 1823. The formal relations were established with the Treaty of Friendship, Commerce and Navigation Between Argentina and the United Kingdom.

=== Argentine National Organization (1853–1879) ===
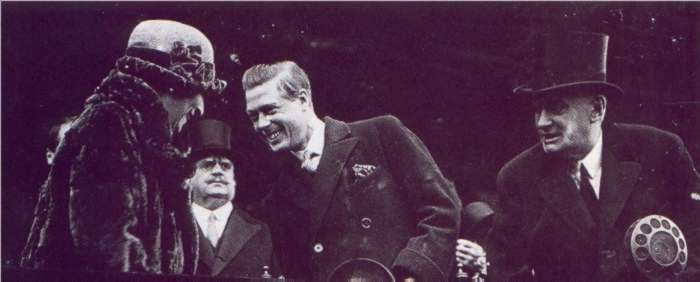
President Marcelo Torcuato de Alvear and the First Lady Regina Pacini with the Prince of Wales and later King Edward VIII of the United Kingdom in Mar del Plata, 1925.

The two countries established diplomatic relations on 15 December 1823. During the National Organization period, Argentina began to outline a foreign policy favouring relations with Britain, which became the main buyer of Argentine raw materials and the major source of investment in the country. By mid century, London bankers were sending in capital, to invest in railways, docks, packing houses, and utilities. London sent in 3000 agents to handle shipping, insurance, and banking.

In 1865, during the Liberal government of Bartolomé Mitre British involvement was tested by the conduct of the Paraguayan War of Argentina, Uruguay and Brazil against the Republic of Paraguay. During the government of Nicolas Avellaneda, the Conquest of the Desert, 1879 he favoured the establishment, in the newly conquered lands of immigrant settlers, and dissemination of railroads of British capital, and cattle and sheep raising.

=== Economic relationship in the 19th century ===
After Argentina obtained its independence, economic ties between Britain and Argentina increased substantially. Britain's textile exports to Argentina grew by 9.4% yearly between 1817 and 1874. Nearly 10 percent of Britain's capital outflows between 1865 and 1914 went to Argentina; this was larger than the British capital outflow to India.

=== The Conservative Republic (1880–1916) ===
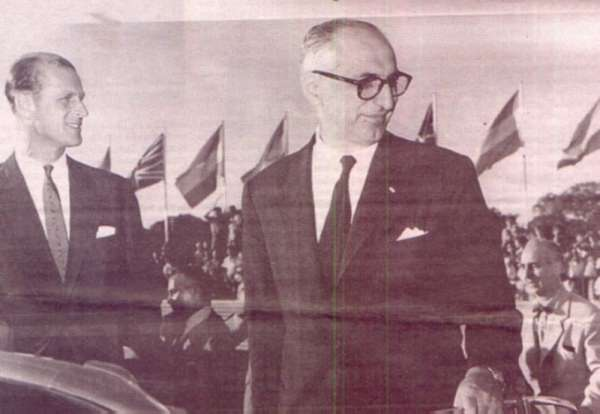
Prince Philip, Duke of Edinburgh and President Arturo Frondizi in 1962.

A series of geographical expeditions to Patagonia, the Strait of Magellan and Tierra del Fuego made by the Argentine explorer Francisco Pascasio Moreno and Chilean expert Diego Barros Arana between 1873 and 1879 helped forge closer ties with Chile and in 1881 the two countries signed the Treaty of limits. In 1896, problems with the demarcation resulted in an arbitration award in Britain. At that time, Moreno was appointed expert on behalf of the Argentine government. In a gesture of brotherhood, 15 February 1899 was found in the Strait of Magellan, Argentine President Julio Argentino Roca and Chilean president Federico Errazuriz Echaurren, in what became known as the "Embrace of the Straits". Finally, the British award was ratified by the General Treaty of Arbitration of 1902 signed in Santiago by Acting Foreign Minister Jose A. Terry, who was criticised on the home front because of the concessions that the country made to Chile and because the agreement subjected perpetual conflict resolution between the two countries to the British crown.

In 1902, the chancellor of the second government of Julio Argentino Roca, Dr. Luis María Drago, made an outstanding performance in his defence of Latin American sovereignty against the sea blockade of Venezuela imposed by Britain, Germany and Italy as punishment for debts that Venezuela had with those countries, and that the president Cipriano Castro refused to pay.

During the First World War, under President Hipólito Yrigoyen, Argentina adopted the policy known as "benevolent neutrality", under which Argentina remained a non-belligerent party throughout the conflict, but provided generous economic assistance to the Allies in the form of interest-free loans, particularly to Britain and France, becoming an important net creditor to the Allied side.

The Roca–Runciman Treaty was signed between the countries on 1 May 1933. It was a trade agreement to help Argentina avoid the effects of a pro-Commonwealth policy, in exchange for lower taxes for imported products from the UK. It was signed by Vice President of Argentina, Julio Argentino Pascual Roca – a request of the president Agustín Pedro Justo and Walter Runciman.

During the Second World War, Britain was the main purchaser of Argentine beef and grain, with the country supplying the majority of beef and a substantial amount of the wheat consumed on the British Isles. When Argentina initially refused to go along with American hemispheric defense policies, choosing instead to maintain neutrality in the conflict, Washington responded by trying to shut down Argentine exports, which led President Franklin Roosevelt to ask Prime Minister Winston Churchill to stop buying Argentine beef and grain. Churchill refused, saying the food was urgently needed.

During the conflict, over 4,000 Argentine volunteers served with all three British armed services. Over 600 Argentine volunteers served with both the Royal Air Force and the Royal Canadian Air Force, mostly in No. 164 (Argentine) squadron, whose shield bore the sun from the Flag of Argentina and the motto, "Determined We Fly (Firmes Volamos)"., and nearly 500 Argentines served in the Royal Navy around the world, from the North Atlantic to the South Pacific. Many were part of the special forces, such as John Godwin. Many members of the Anglo-Argentine community also volunteered in non-combat roles, or worked to raise money and supplies for British troops. The Anglo-Argentine Fellowship of the Bellows in Argentina raised money to buy aircraft for the RAF. In April 2005, a special remembrance service was held at the RAF church of St Clement Danes in London.

=== Falklands War ===
In 1965, formal talks began regarding the Falkland Islands, and Argentina was heading towards some form of sovereignty with guarantees for the Anglophone population when the junta leaders' domestic situation deteriorated. Looking for a distraction, they invaded the Falklands in 1982, miscalculating Britain's response. The UK sent a naval task force that arrived after a month, and defeated Argentina in just over three weeks. The war toppled the junta in Buenos Aires and helped re-elect Prime Minister Margaret Thatcher in Britain. Although sovereignty over the Falklands remains disputed, Britain garrisoned them.

=== Post-war relations ===
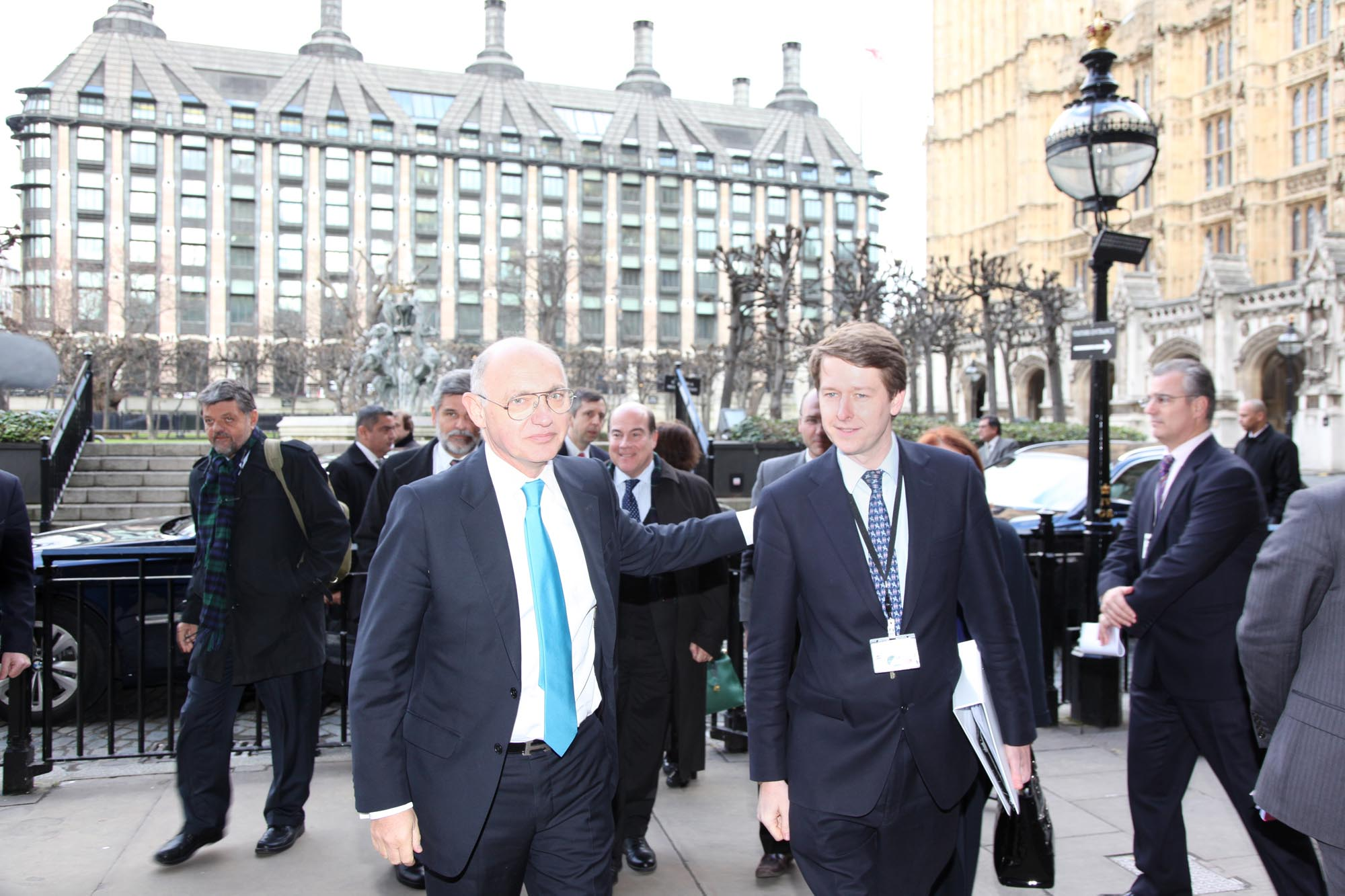
Foreign Minister, Hector Timerman and Robin Walker at the British Parliament.

In the 1990s, relations between the UK and Argentina improved further. In 1998, Carlos Menem, the President of Argentina visited London, where he reaffirmed his country's claims to the Islands, although he stated that Argentina would use only peaceful means to obtain them. In 2001, Tony Blair, Prime Minister of the United Kingdom visited Argentina where he stated that he hoped the UK and Argentina could resolve their differences that led to the 1982 war. However, no talks on sovereignty took place during the visit and Argentina's president Néstor Kirchner stated that he regarded gaining sovereignty over the islands as a 'top priority' of his government.

=== Modern times ===
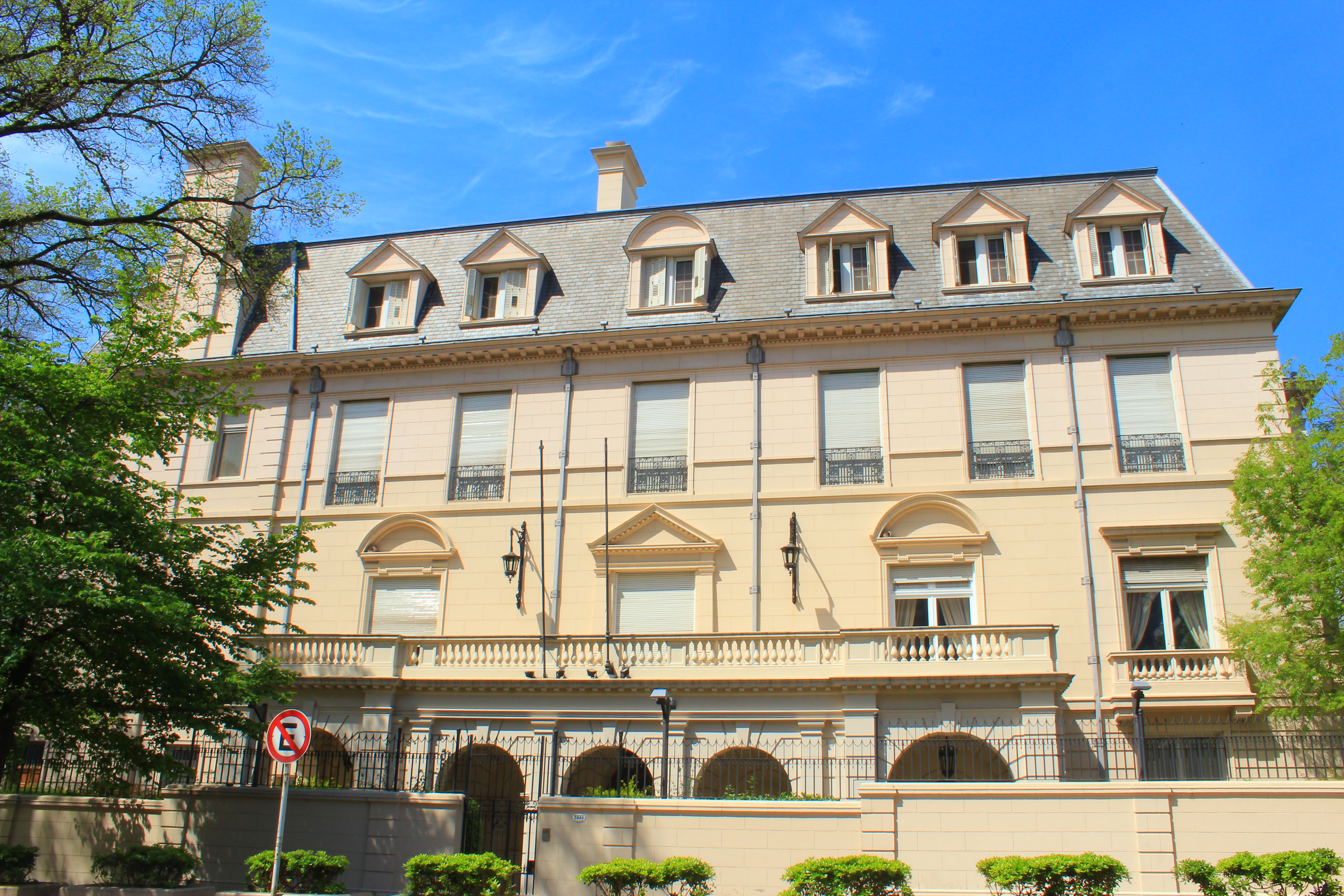
Embassy of the United Kingdom, Buenos Aires.

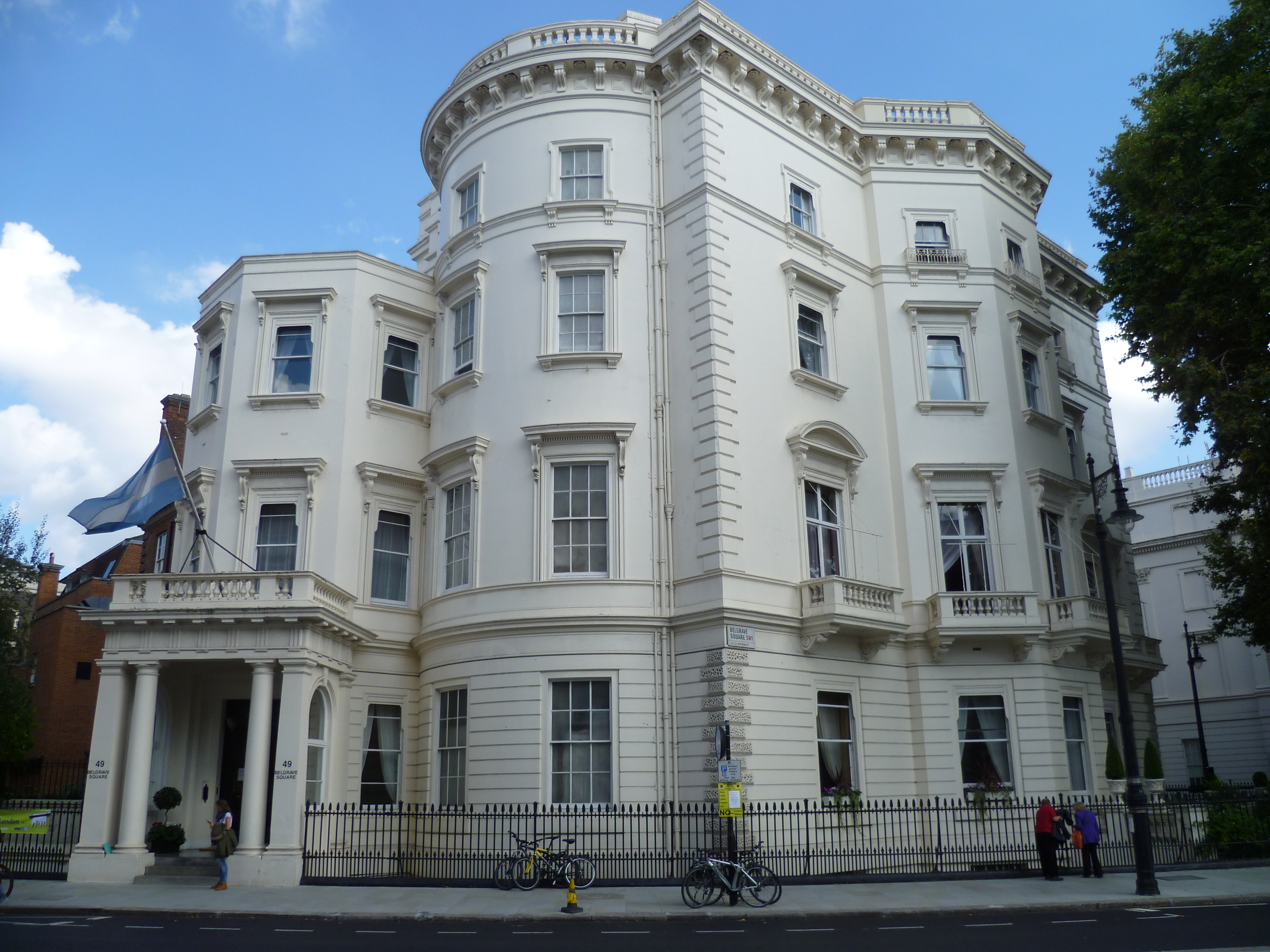
Embassy of Argentina, London

Since the mid-2000s, diplomatic relations between the UK and Argentina have become increasingly strained. In 2006, Argentina renewed claims to the Falkland Islands, citing concern over fishing and petroleum rights. On 28 March 2009, UK prime minister Gordon Brown stated that there was "nothing to discuss" with Cristina Kirchner, the Argentine president, over sovereignty of the islands, when they met in Chile on his pre-2009 G-20 London Summit world tour. On 22 April 2009 Argentina made a formal claim to the UN to an area of the continental shelf encompassing the Falklands, South Georgia and South Sandwich Islands, and parts of Antarctica, citing 11 years worth of maritime survey data. The UK quickly protested against these claims.

Since 2010, reports of British oil exploration around the Falkland Islands have caused a further downturn in UK–Argentine relations. In February 2010 the Argentine government announced that ships travelling to the Falklands (as well as South Georgia and the South Sandwich Islands) would require a permit to use Argentine territorial waters. Despite the new restrictions, Desire Petroleum began drilling for oil on 22 February 2010, about 54 nautical miles (100 km, 62 mi) north of the Islands.

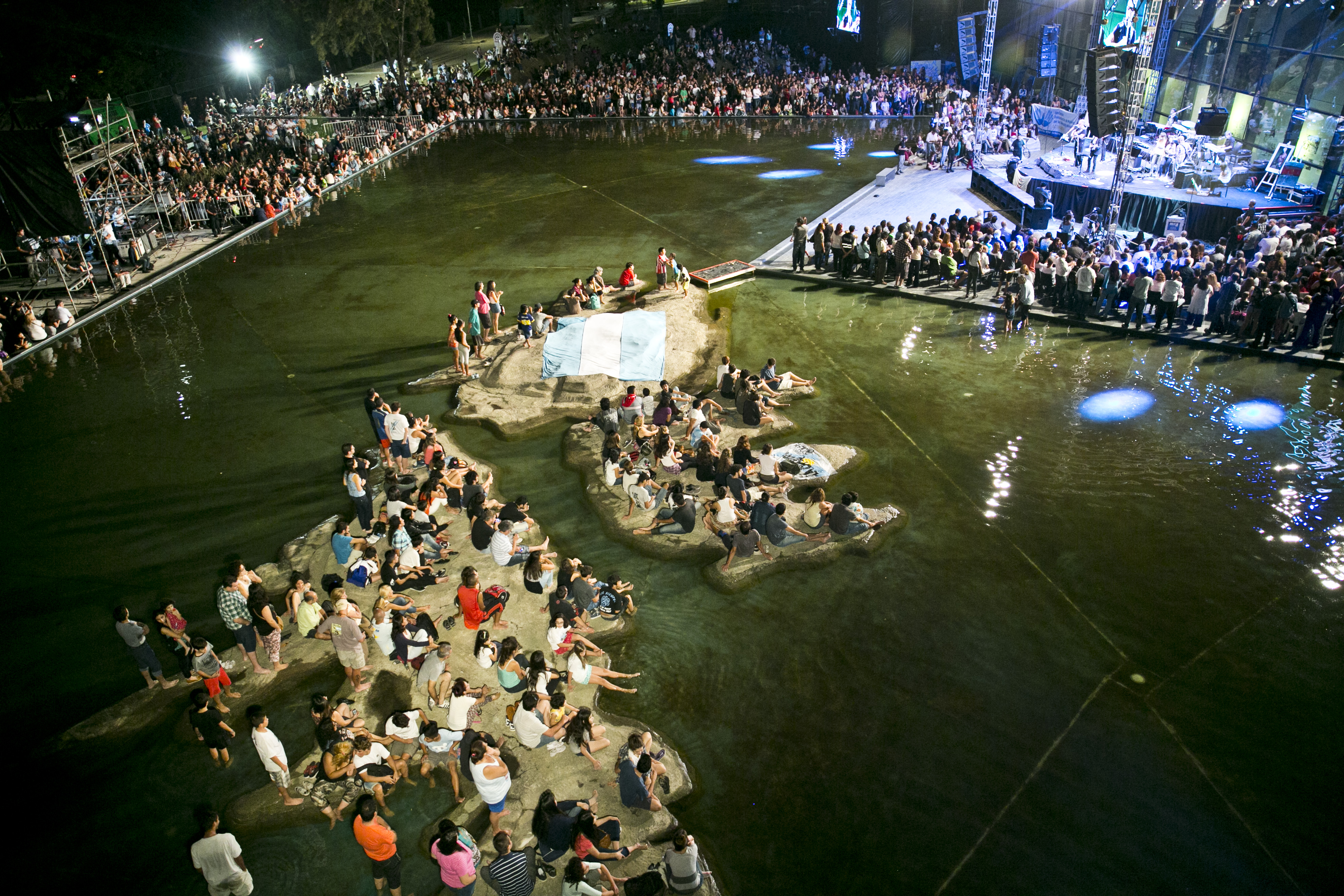
Malvinas and South Atlantic Islands Museum in Buenos Aires devoted to Argentina's claim on the Falkland Islands.

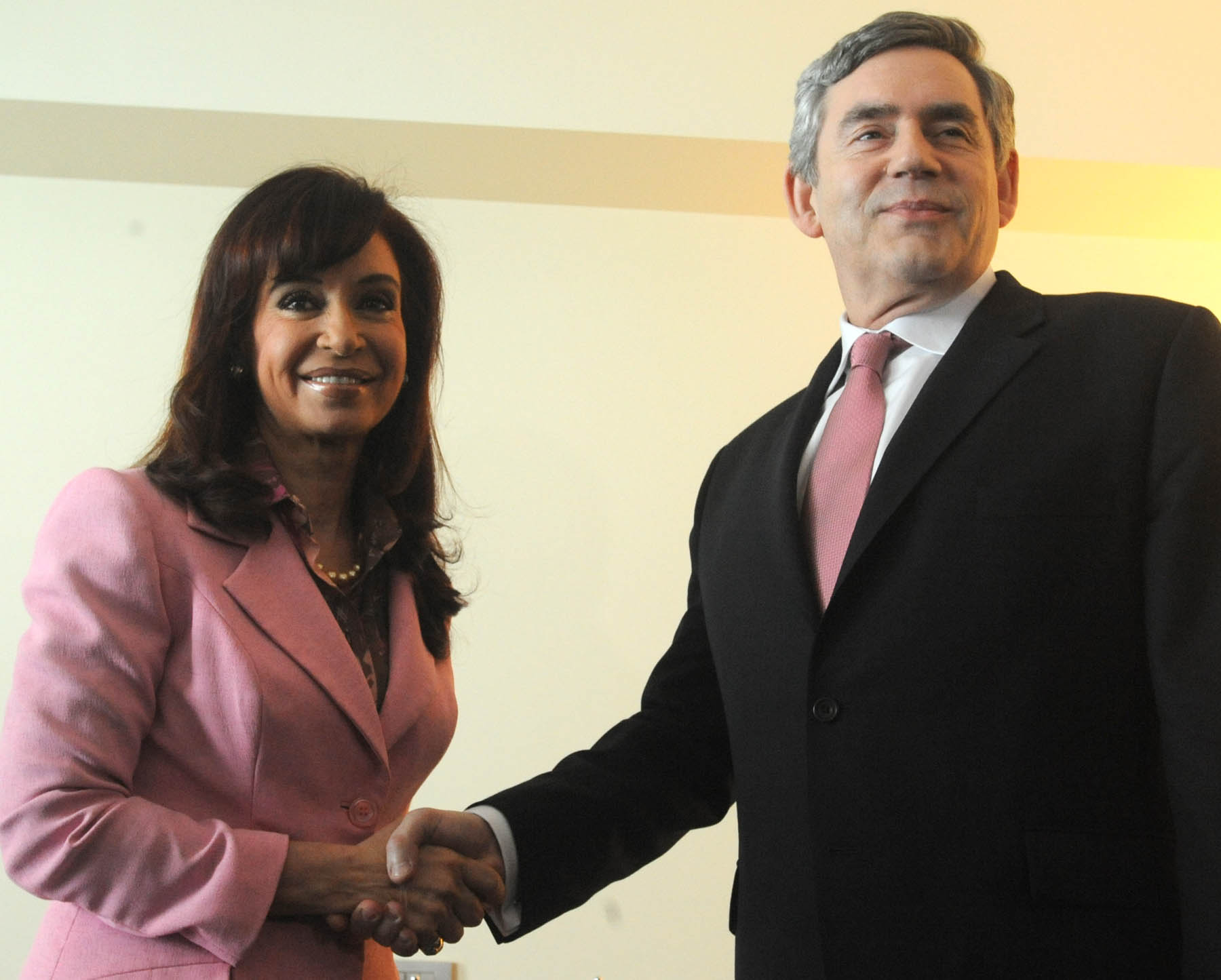
Former President Cristina Kirchner and former Prime Minister Gordon Brown in 2009.

Governments of South American countries have generally shown support for Argentina over the Falkland Islands sovereignty dispute in recent years. This is in contrast to the Falklands War when Britain was supported by Chile. In 2011 the Mercosur bloc agreed to close ports to ships flying the Falkland Islands flags, while British-flagged ships would continue to be allowed. The Unasur group of nations has asked the United Kingdom to pursue negotiations over the islands' sovereignty. On 19 March 2012, Peru announced that it was cancelling a visit by the Royal Navy frigate HMS Montrose in support of Argentina's claim to the islands.

At the G20 Summit in Mexico in June 2012, British Prime Minister David Cameron and Argentine President Cristina Fernández de Kirchner met unexpectedly in a corridor on the fringes of the G20 Summit and exchanged, at least in diplomatic terms, some rather heated words. Prime Minister Cameron told President Kirchner that she should "respect the views" of Falkland residents, who had announced the 2013 referendum, on the issue of future sovereignty of the island. President Kirchner then attempted to hand an envelope to the prime minister but he refused to accept it.

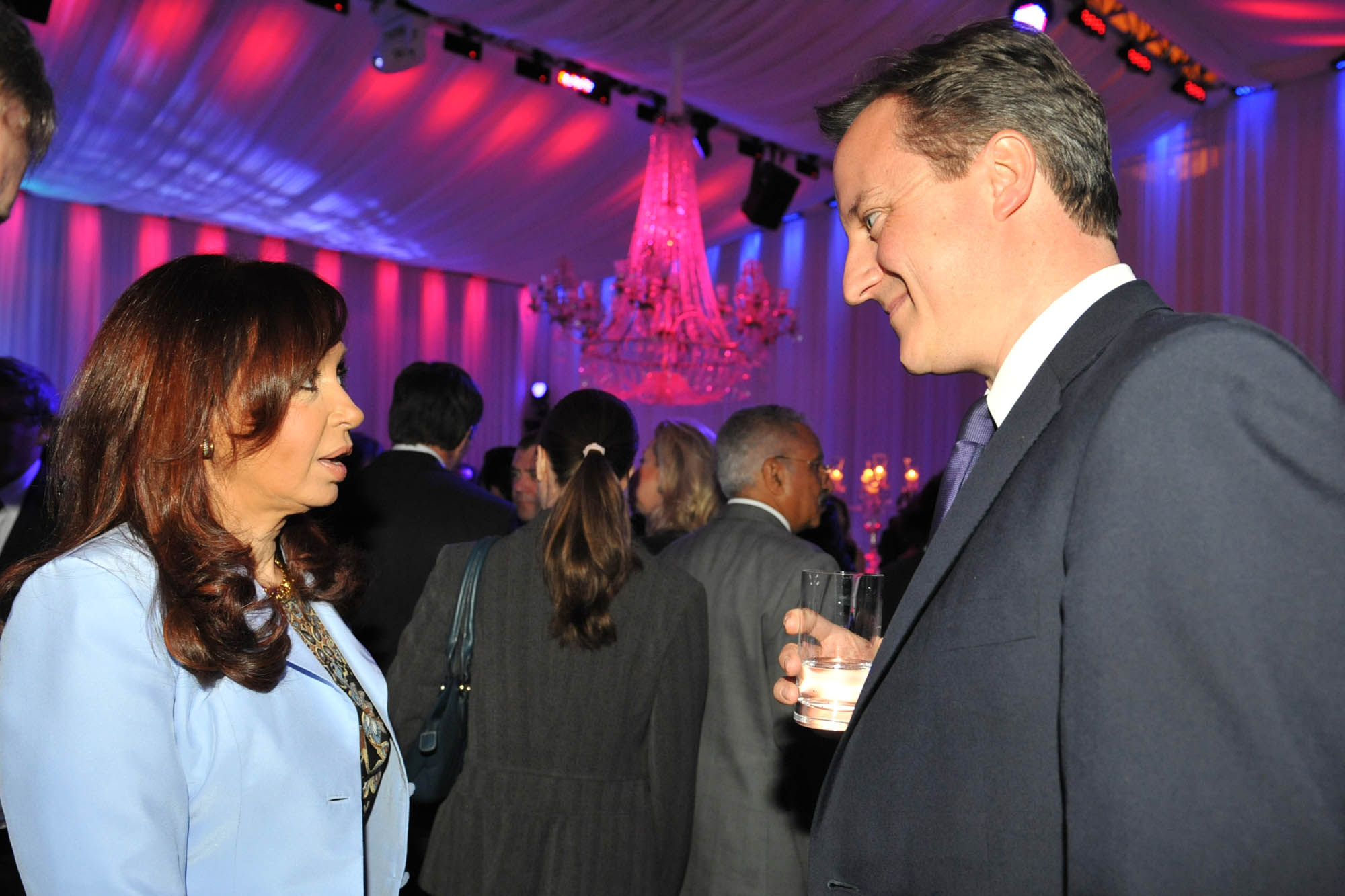
Kirchner with former Prime Minister David Cameron at the 2010 G20 Seoul summit.

In March 2013 the Falkland Islanders voted overwhelmingly in a referendum for the territory to remain British 1,513 to 3, 99.8% in favor of British control. Argentina dismissed the Falkland Islands' sovereignty referendum. The UK Government urged Argentina and other countries to respect the islanders' wishes.

On the 33rd anniversary of the invasion of the islands on 2 April 2015 Premier Oil, Rockhopper Exploration and Falkland Oil & Gas announced that they had found oil and gas in an offshore field to the north of the islands. On 3 April 2015 the Argentine Government announced that it was preparing to take legal action against the United Kingdom and the companies involved in oil exploration around the islands without Argentina's permission. On 8 April 2015 Argentina officially condemned British plans to boost Britain's military presence on the Falklands and that it would be pressing criminal charges against companies conducting oil and gas exploration in the islands.

In 2015, Mauricio Macri was elected President of Argentina. In office, Macri struck a more conciliatory note with regards to the Falklands and appeared to wish to have much more cordial relations with Britain, but nevertheless reaffirmed Argentine sovereignty over the Falkland Islands as a long-term goal. In November 2017, an RAF plane landed in Argentina for the first time since before the Falklands war, to assist in the hunt for the missing submarine ARA San Juan.

Despite these developments, where possible, Britain continued to actively oppose modernization of the Argentine military. In 2019, the Argentine Air Force and government selected the Korean KAI FA-50 as its interim fighter to replace its aging Falklands-vintage aircraft such as the Mirage III, the A-4AR Fightinghawk and the Super Étendard. However, the deal was cancelled in early 2020 leaving the Air Force without a fighter replacement. British intervention was apparently a key factor in the cancellation with Britain stopping the export of the aircraft incorporating various British components. In October 2020, Korea Aerospace Industries (KAI) confirmed that since major components of the aircraft were supplied by the U.K., the aircraft could not be exported to Argentina. Britain similarly blocked the potential sale of Brazilian license-built Saab Gripen aircraft to Argentina given avionics that were of British origin.

Following his election as President of Argentina in 2023, Javier Milei asserted that Argentina had "non-negotiable sovereignty" over the islands.

In April 2026, following a leaked Pentagon email suggesting the US might review its support for British sovereignty over the Falkland Islands as punishment for the UK's stance on the Iran war, Argentine Foreign Minister Pablo Quirno reiterated Argentina's willingness to resume bilateral negotiations with the United Kingdom to achieve a "peaceful and definitive solution" to the sovereignty dispute.

In September 2026 relations were further strained, as President Javier Milei gave the Sea Lion oilfield project a two week deadline to cease development and said that Argentina will pursue international arbitration against the UK if work continued, including bringing the matter before the international tribunal for the Law of the Sea. The field, located approximately 130 miles from the Falkland Islands, is estimated to contain 1.7B barrels of oil and is being developed by Britain's Rockhopper Exploration and Israel's Navitas Petroleum. The companies claim that their licenses were validly issued by the Falkland Islands authorities.

== Cultural relations ==
According to the 2001 UK Census, some 3,932 people born in Argentina were living in the UK. Between 1997 and 2008, 1,062 Argentines acquired British citizenship.

There is a strong British cultural influence in Argentina and a large Argentine-British community around Buenos Aires. There is also a strong Welsh-speaking Argentine-Welsh community in Chubut, Patagonia. Of the 25,000 Welsh speakers in Argentina, 5,000 live in the Chubut region, particularly in the original Welsh settlements of Trelew and Trevelin. A large number of Argentine football players play for British clubs. The British Council promotes an active academic, cultural and educational programme in Argentina. The British Council administers the Chevening Scholarship programme, funded by the Foreign and Commonwealth Office, which sends approximately 15 Argentine postgraduate students to the UK each year.

=== English background ===
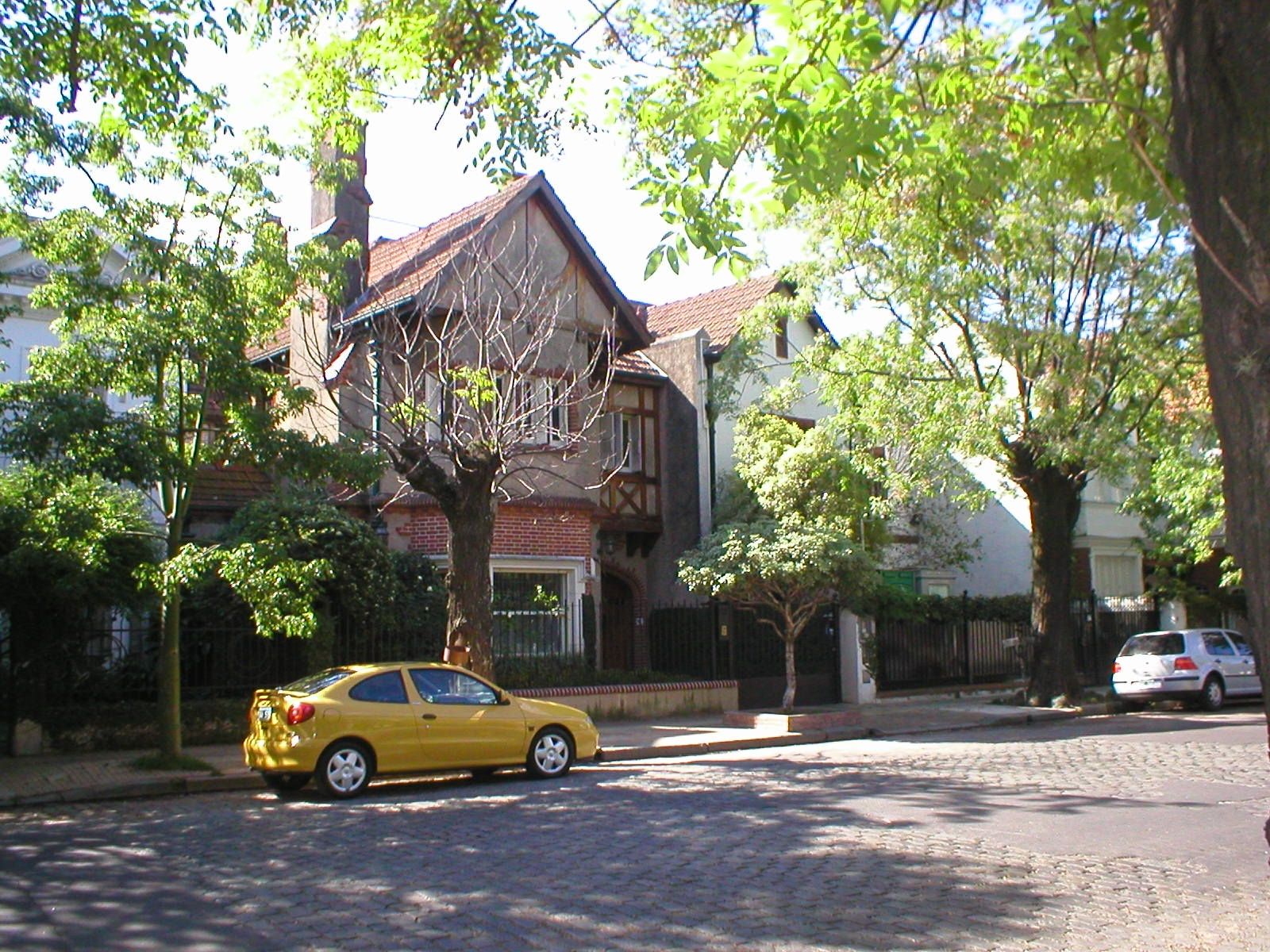
English-style houses on a residential street in Belgrano R.

English culture, or a version of it as perceived from outside, had a noted effect on the culture of Argentina, mainly in the middle classes. In 1888 local Anglo-Argentines established the Hurlingham Club, based on its namesake in London. The city of Hurlingham, Buenos Aires and Hurlingham Partido in Buenos Aires Province later grew up around the club and took their names from it. The Córdoba Athletic Club, one of the oldest sports clubs in Argentina, was founded in 1882 by English men that lived in Córdoba working on the railways.

In 1912 Harrods opened a department store in Buenos Aires; the only Harrods ever opened outside London. Harrods Buenos Aires became independent of Harrods in the 1940s but still traded under the Harrods name. Afternoon tea became standard amongst large segments of the population and generated the popular merienda, an afternoon snack also known simply as la leche (milk) because it was served with tea or chocolate milk along with sweets. The Richmond café on Florida Street is a notable tea venue near the Harrods department store, now turned into an exhibition hall.

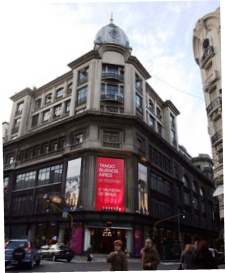
Harrods on Florida Street. Opened in 1912 as their only overseas branch, it closed in 1996 and is now an exhibition hall.

Gardened chalets built by railway executives near railway stations in suburbs such as Banfield, Temperley, Munro, Ranelagh and Hurlingham gave a pointed English atmosphere to local areas in Buenos Aires, especially in winter when shrouded in grey mists and fallen oak leaves over cobblestones. Belgrano R, within the Belgrano district, is another train station known for the British neighbourhood around it originated by the railway. An Anglican church from 1896 and the Buenos Aires English High School founded by Alexander Watson Hutton in 1884 are both located in this area. Also important are the railway terminals Retiro in the homonymous neighbourhood and Constitución. There are numerous countryside stations in the Pampas.

Around 100,000 Anglo-Argentines are the descendants of English immigrants to Argentina. They are one of the most successful immigrant groups of Argentina, gaining prominence in commerce, industry, and the professions. Many are noted by their ability to speak English in family circles with an undistinguishable English accent. An English-language newspaper, the Buenos Aires Herald, was published daily in Buenos Aires from 1876 to 2017.

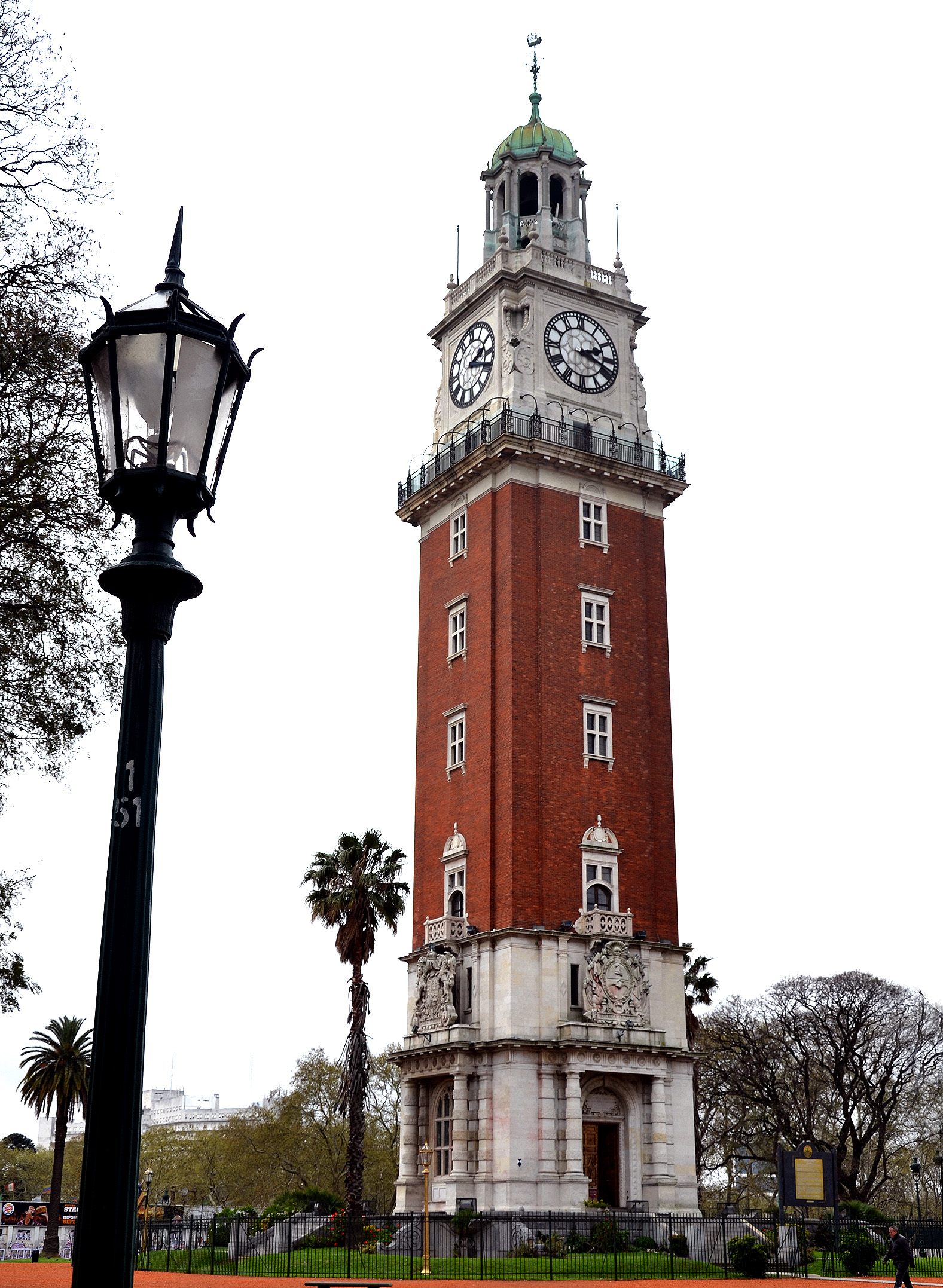
Tower of the English, Buenos Aires built in 1916.

Anglo-Argentines have traditionally differed from their fellow Argentines by largely retaining strong ties with their mother country, including education and commerce. Many of the schools in Argentina are bilingual offering both English language and Spanish language, including Northlands School, St. Mark's College, Balmoral College, St. Alban's College, St. George's College, Belgrano Day School and Washington School. Buenos Aires had a number of branches of the Asociación Argentina de Cultura Inglesa (English Cultural Association) and throughout the 20th century English language learning and teaching in state schools and private institutions was invariably geared towards the Received Pronunciation. Blue blazers and grey flannels are still used as uniforms in most private schools.

The Anglo-Argentine Society, based in London, was founded in 1948 and has about 900 members. It is a society for Argentine people living in the United Kingdom, particularly those of Anglo-Argentine heritage. One of its main aims is to promote understanding and friendship between the two countries. Also in London is the Canning Club, formerly the Argentine Club until Juan Perón nationalised Argentine-based British businesses, the main source of revenue of the club in the 1940s. The club is for those with a particular link to, or special interest in, Argentina and other Latin American countries.

The Coghlan neighbourhood in Buenos Aires, known for its large English-style residences, was originally inhabited by English and Irish immigrants. Furthermore, Caballito contains an area called the "English District".

In 1794, the United Kingdom opened a consulate in San Nicolás, leading to the development of a large British community in the area, which became known as the "English borough". They founded the English Merchants' Society in 1810 and in 1822 the British Consulate became home to the first modern bank in Buenos Aires.

=== Scottish influence ===
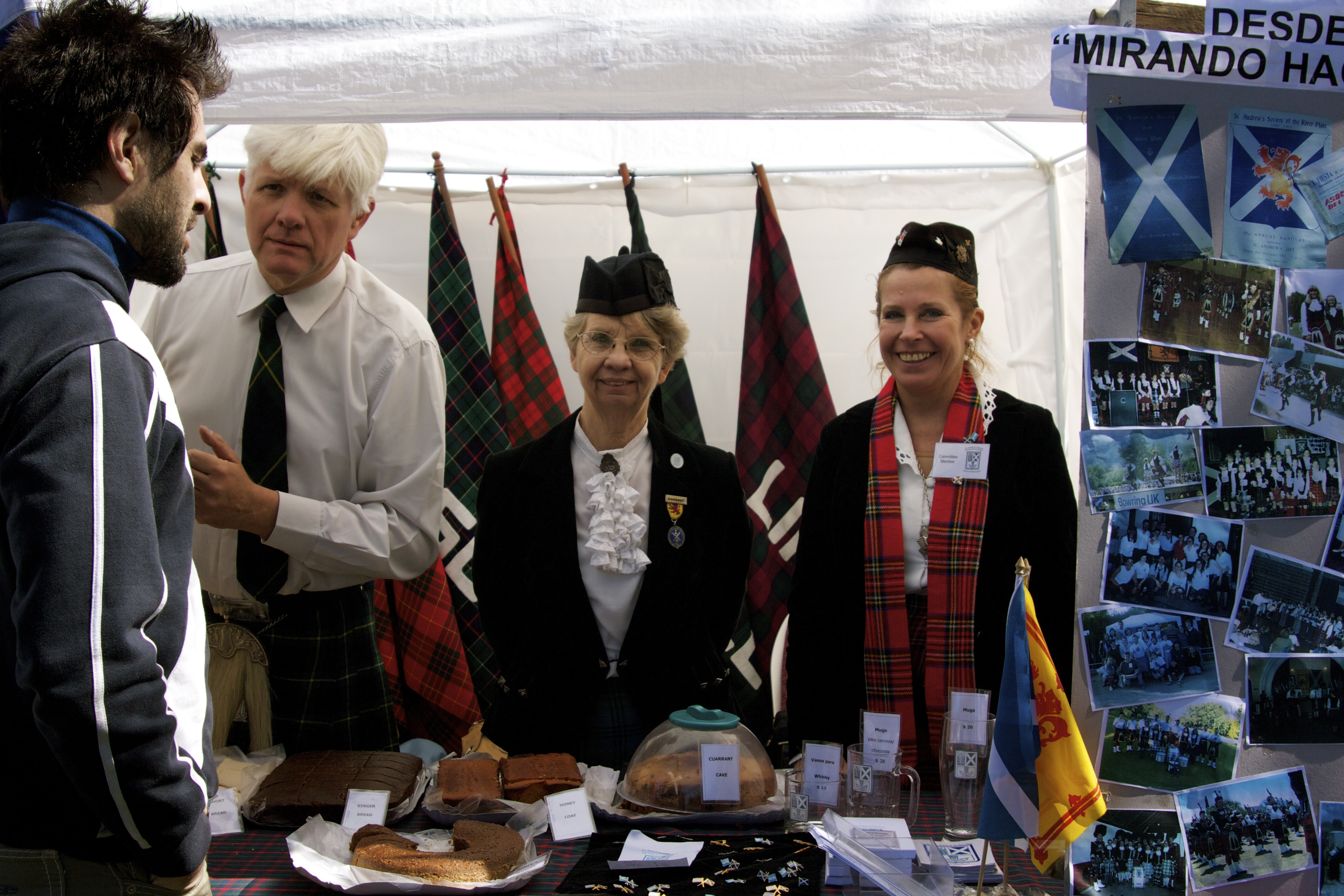
Argentines of Scottish descent in Buenos Aires.

The so-called "father of Argentine football" was a Glaswegian schoolteacher, Alexander Watson Hutton, who first taught football at St. Andrew's Scots School in Buenos Aires in the early 1880s. On 4 February 1884 he founded the Buenos Aires English High School [sic] where he continued to instruct the pupils in the game. In 1891 Hutton established the Association Argentine Football League, the first football league outside of the British Isles. Five clubs competed but only one season was ever played.

The St. Andrew's Scots School was established in Buenos Aires in 1838 and is the oldest school of British origin in South America.

=== Y Wladfa ===
Flag of Puerto Madryn and the Welsh colony in the Argentine Patagonia.

The idea of a Welsh colony in South America was put forward by Professor Michael D. Jones, a Welsh nationalist non-conformist preacher based in Bala who had called for a new "little Wales beyond Wales". He spent some years in the United States, where he observed that Welsh immigrants assimilated very quickly compared with other peoples and often lost much of their Welsh identity. He proposed setting up a Welsh-speaking colony away from the influence of the English language. He recruited settlers and provided financing; Australia, New Zealand and even Palestine were considered, but Patagonia was chosen for its isolation and the Argentines' offer of 100 square miles (260 km²) of land along the Chubut River in exchange for settling the still-unconquered land of Patagonia for Argentina. Michael D Jones had been corresponding with the Argentinean government about settling an area known as Bahía Blanca where Welsh immigrants could preserve their language and culture. The Argentinean government granted the request as it put them in control of a large tract of land. A Welsh immigration committee met in Liverpool and published a handbook, 'Llawlyfr y Wladfa' to publicise the scheme to form a Welsh colony in Patagonia which was distributed throughout Wales.

Towards the end of 1862, Captain Love Jones-Parry and Lewis Jones (after whom Trelew was named) left for Patagonia to decide whether it was a suitable area for Welsh emigrants. They first visited Buenos Aires where they held discussions with the Interior Minister Guillermo Rawson then, having come to an agreement, headed south. They reached Patagonia in a small ship named the Candelaria, and were driven by a storm into a bay which they named "Porth Madryn" after Jones-Parry's estate in Wales. The town which grew near the spot where they landed is now named Puerto Madryn. On their return to Wales they declared the area to be very suitable for colonisation.

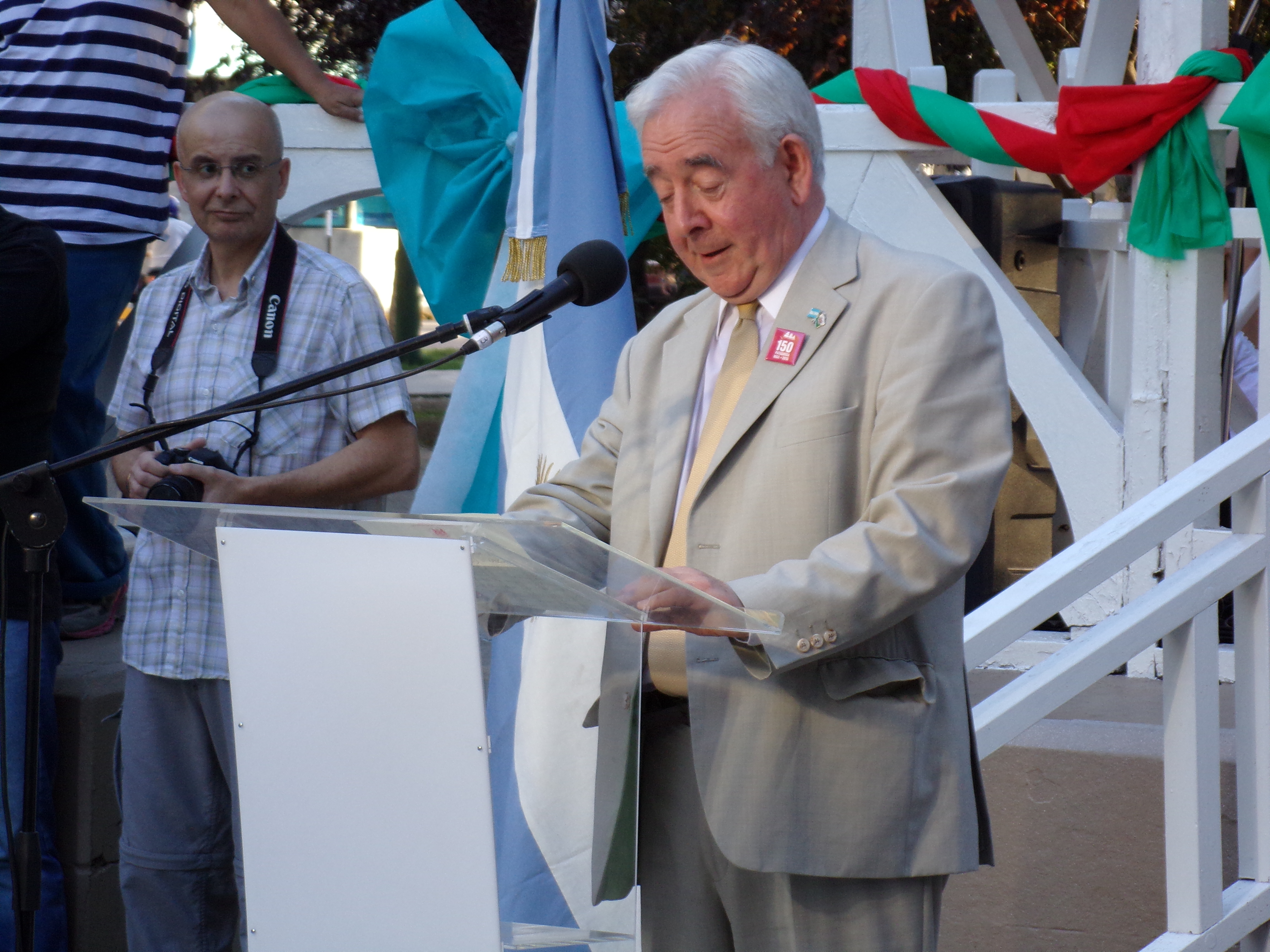
Dafydd Wigley declared twinning agreement between Trelew and Caernarfon.

The permanent European settlement of the Chubut Valley and surrounding areas began on 28 July 1865 when 153 Welsh settlers arrived aboard the converted tea-clipper Mimosa. The Mimosa had cost £2,500 to hire for the voyage and convert to passenger use, and the fare from Liverpool to Patagonia was £12 for adults and £6 for children, although anyone willing to travel was taken on the journey regardless of ability to pay. The Mimosa settlers, including tailors, cobblers, carpenters, brickmakers, and miners, comprised 56 married adults, 33 single or widowed men, 12 single women (usually sisters or servants of married immigrants), and 52 children; the majority (92) were from the South Wales Coalfield and English urban centres. There were few farmers, which was rather unfortunate particularly when they discovered that the attractions of the area had been oversold and they had landed in an arid semi-desert with little food; they had been told that the area was like lowland Wales. At the coast there was little drinking water, and the group embarked on a walk across the parched plain with a single wheelbarrow to carry their belongings. Some died and a baby, Mary Humphries, was born on the march. John Williams was the only colonist with any form of rudimentary medical skill.

Once they reached the valley of the Chubut River, their first settlement was a small fortress on the site which later became the town of Rawson, now the capital of Chubut province. This was referred to as Yr Hen Amddiffynfa (The Old Fortress). The first houses, constructed from earth, were washed away by a flash flood in 1865, and new houses of superior quality were built to replace them. The floods also washed away crops of potatoes and maize. The rainfall in the area was much less than the colonists had been led to expect, leading to crop failures.

== Religion ==
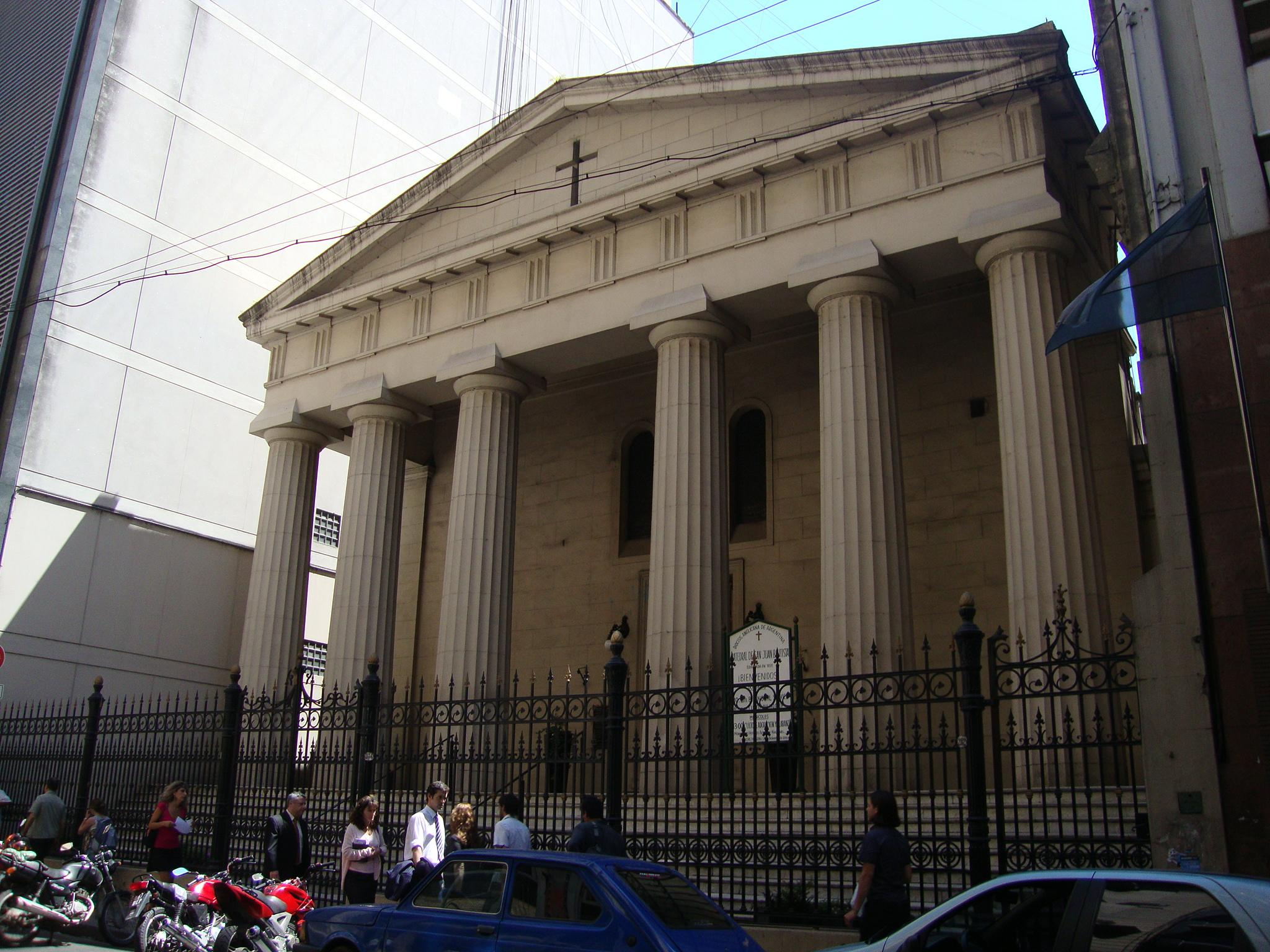
Anglican Cathedral of St. John the Baptist, in Buenos Aires, is the oldest non-Catholic church building in South America.

Anglican churches were established in Argentina, where the religion is otherwise overwhelmingly Roman Catholic, in the early 19th century to give a chaplaincy service to expatriate workers living in Argentina. In 1824 permission was given to hold Anglican church services, and in 1831 St. John's Church was built in San Nicolás, Buenos Aires on land donated in 1830 by Governor Juan Manuel de Rosas for the benefit of the new St. John the Baptist Anglican Church. It is the oldest in existence in Buenos Aires.

English naval captain and Christian missionary, Allen Gardiner founded the Patagonia Mission (later to be renamed the South American Missionary Society) in 1844 to recruit, send, and support Protestant Christian missionaries. His first mission, which included a surgeon and three fishermen was sent to the Yaghans on the island of Isla Grande de Tierra del Fuego. They arrived at Picton island in Tierra del Fuego in December 1850, but their food began to run out. They had expected scheduled supplies, however they did not arrive, and by September 1851 they had died from sickness and hunger. The Patagonia Mission continued and in 1854 changed its name to the South American Missionary Society.

In January 1869 the society established a mission at Ushuaia in Tierra del Fuego under its superintendent, Waite Hockin Stirling. On 21 December 1869 Stirling was ordained at Westminster Abbey as the first Bishop of the Falkland Islands and at the time had episcopal authority over the whole of South America, until power shifted to the Bishop of Buenos Aires. In 1914 the first mission, Misión Chaqueña, was founded in the north of Argentina.

== Twinnings ==
- (Argentina) Esquel, Chubut Province and (Wales) Aberystwyth, Ceredigion
- (Argentina) La Plata, Buenos Aires Province and (England) Liverpool
- (Argentina) Puerto Madryn, Chubut Province and (Wales) Nefyn, Gwynedd
- (Argentina) Tres de Febrero, Buenos Aires Province and (England) Folkestone, Kent
- (Argentina) Trelew, Chubut Province and (Wales) Caernarfon, Gwynedd

== Gallery ==
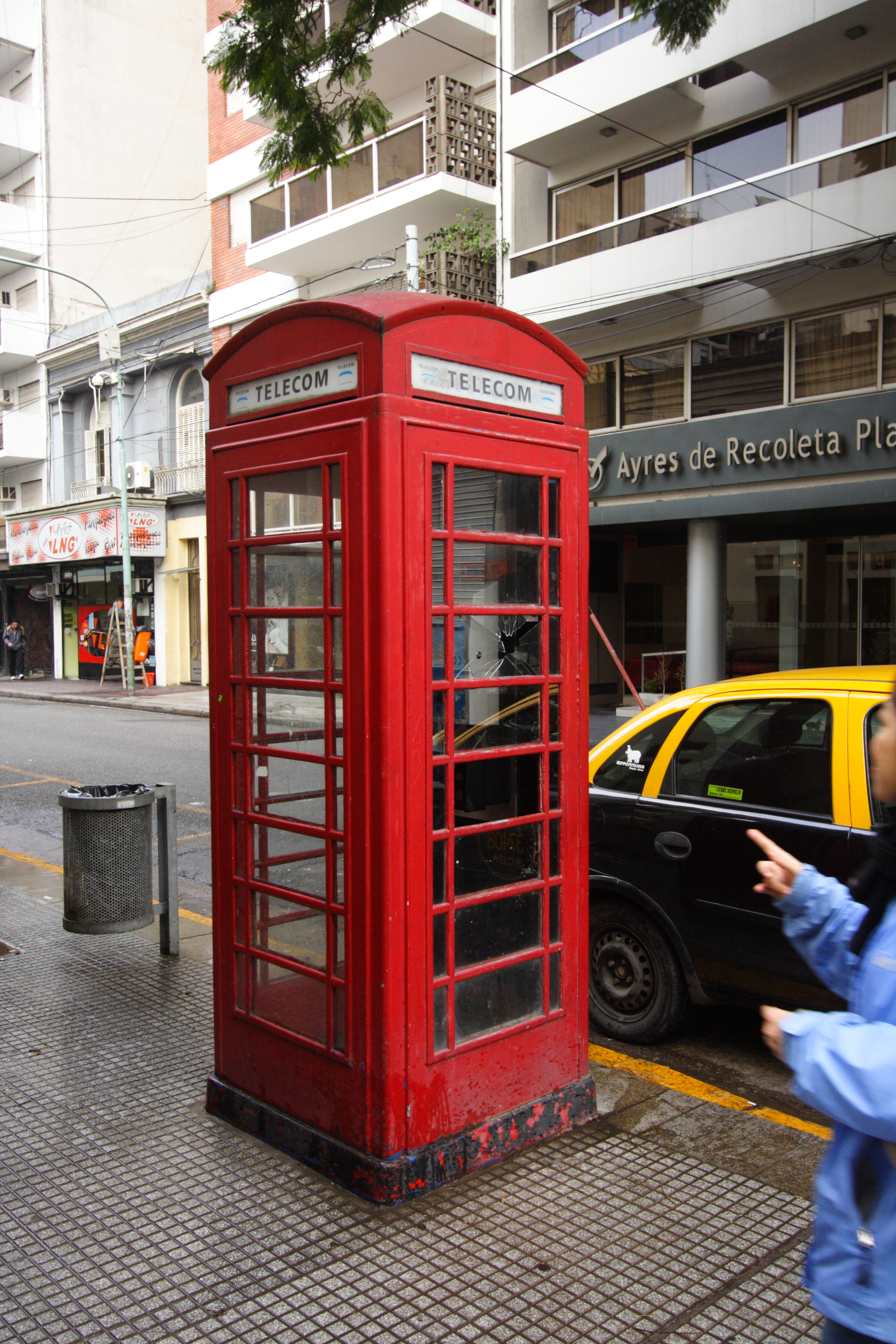
Red telephone box in Buenos Aires

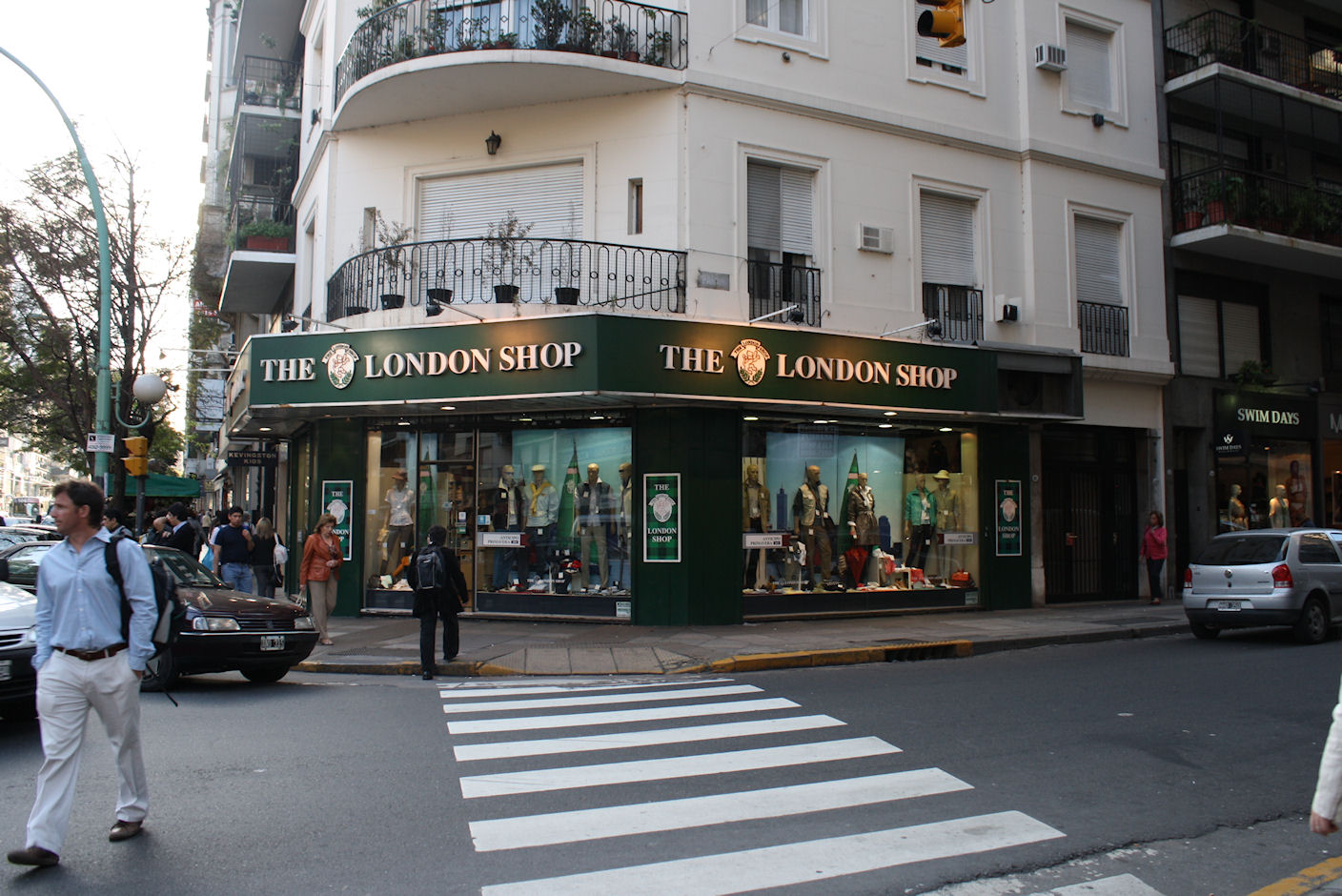
The London Shop in Buenos Aires

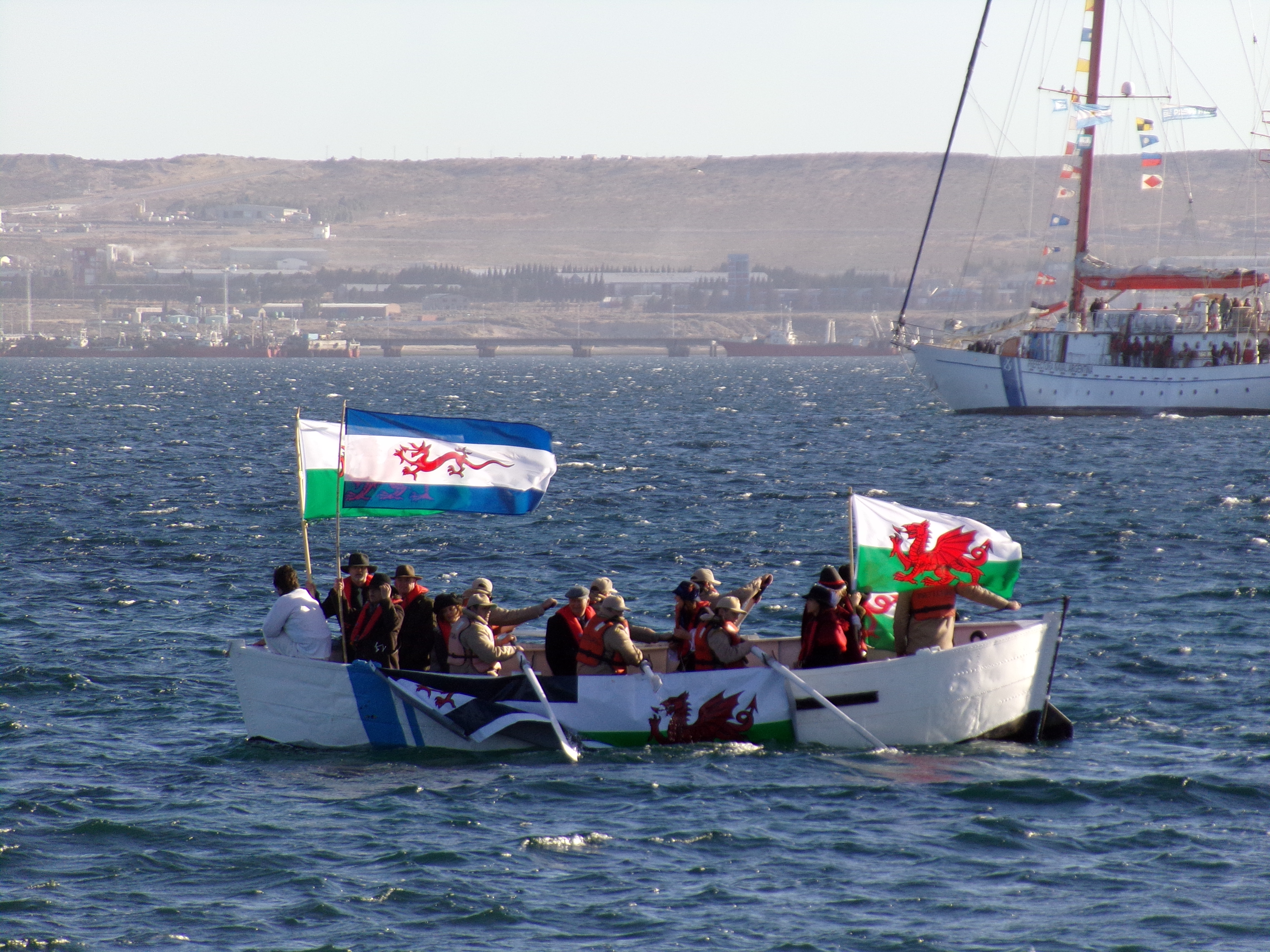
Recreation of the landing of Mimosa sailboat.

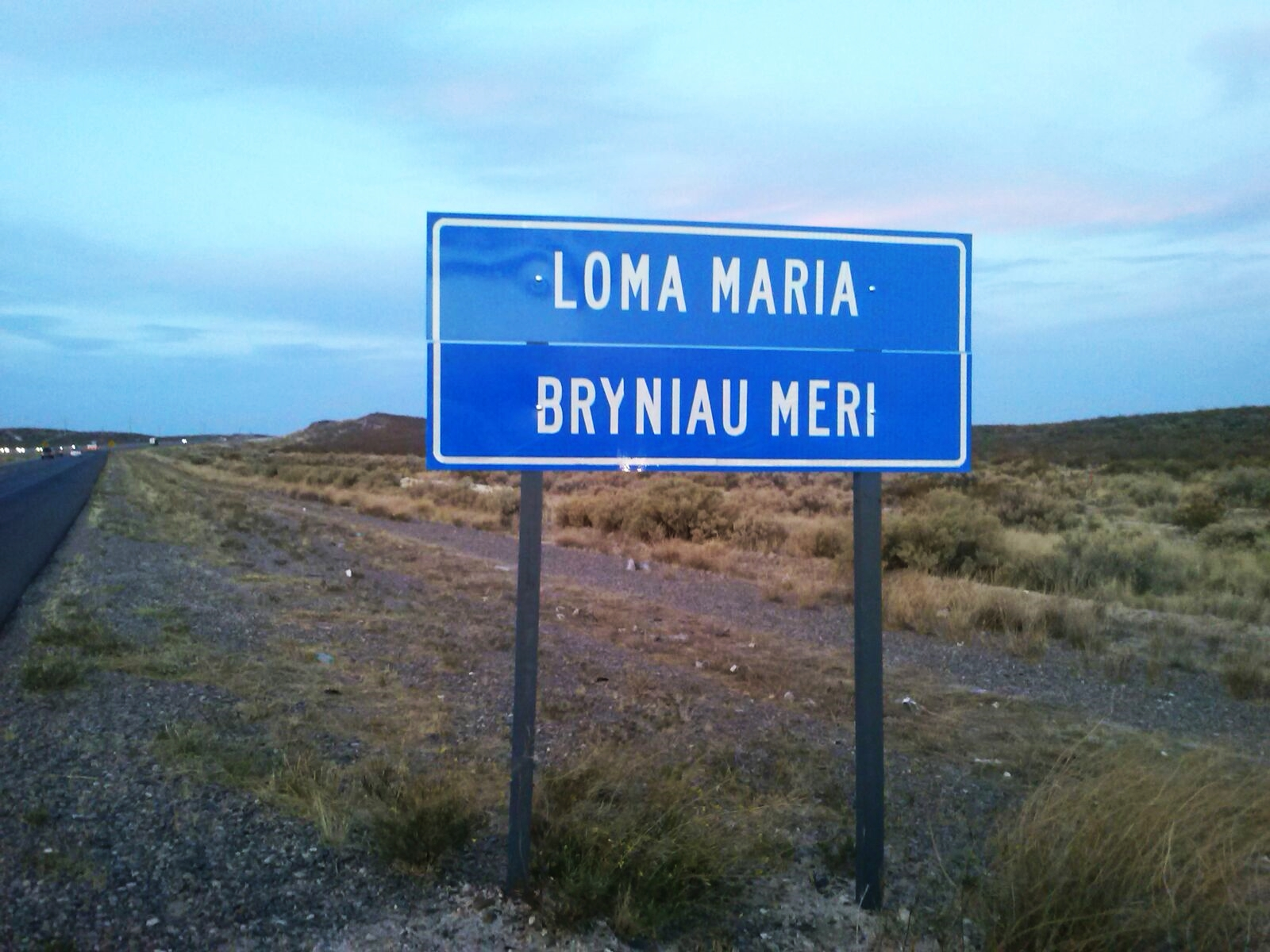
Spanish-Welsh bilingual signage in Loma Maria (Bryniau Meri)

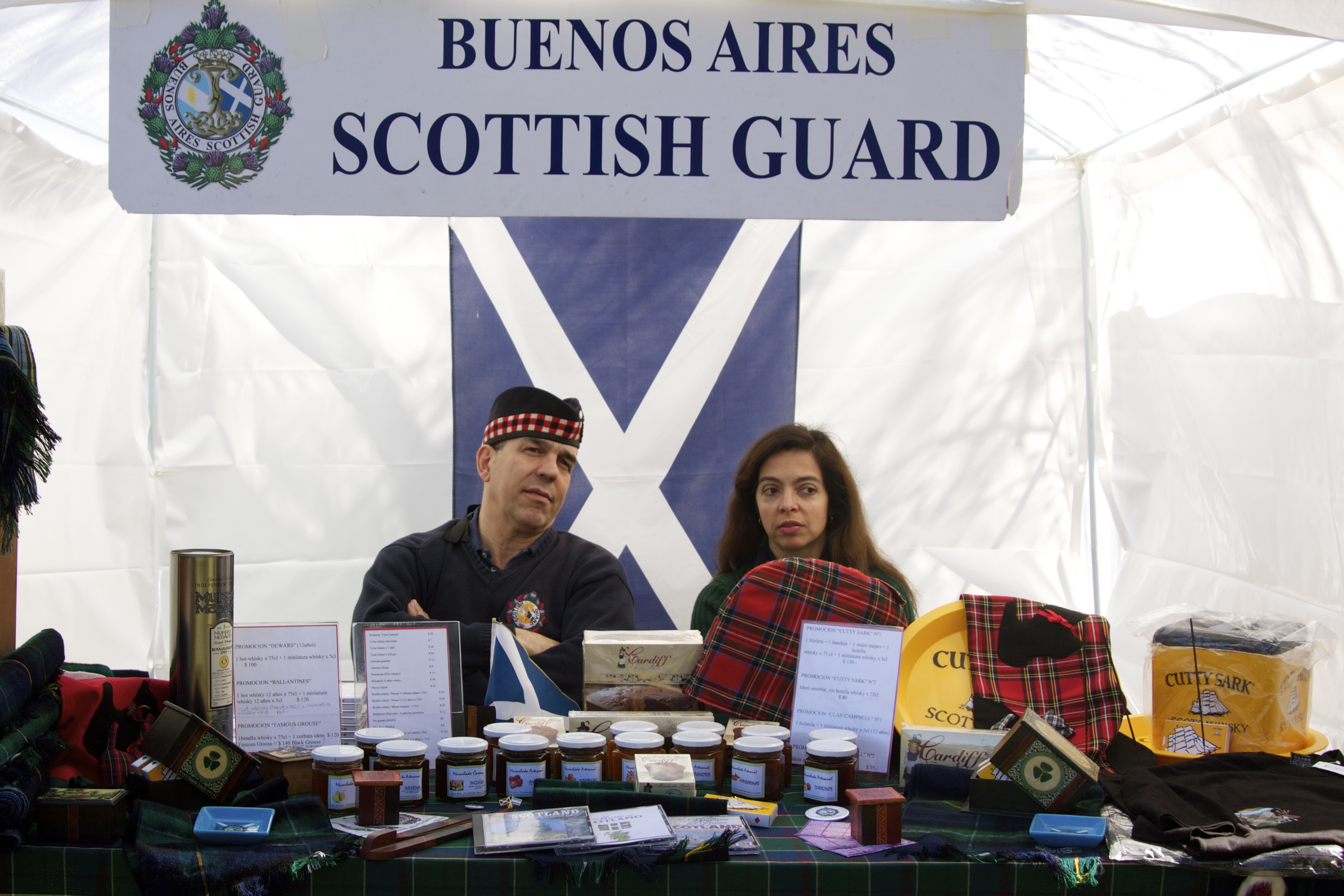
Buenos Aires Scottish Guard

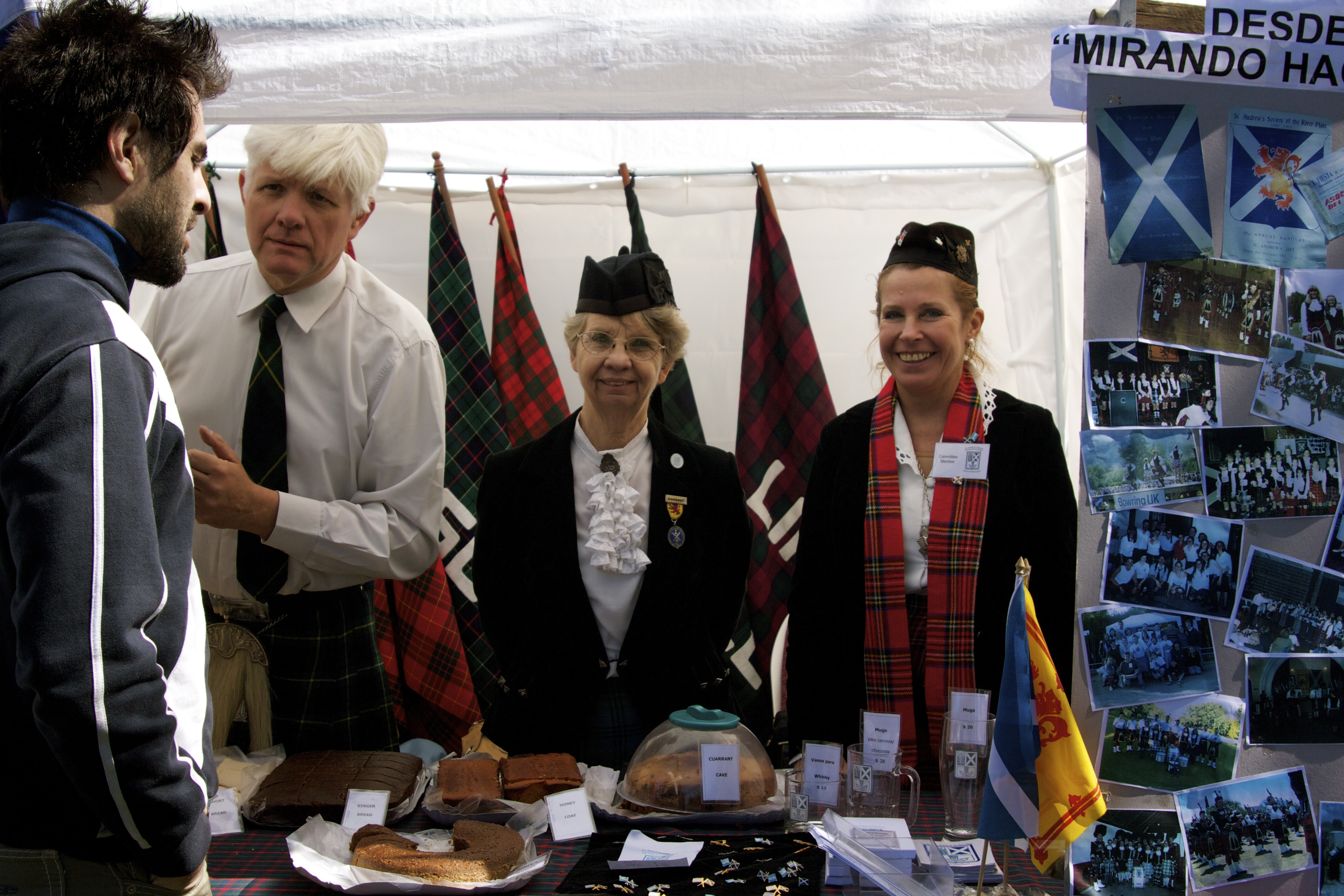
Argentines of Scottish descent

== See also ==
- Foreign relations of Argentina
- Foreign relations of the United Kingdom
- Argentina–England football rivalry
- Latin America–United Kingdom relations
- Latin American migration to the United Kingdom
- List of Ambassadors of the United Kingdom to Argentina
- St. Andrew's Scots School
- University of San Andrés
- Buenos Aires English High School
- English Argentine
- Welsh Argentine
- Scottish Argentine
