= Nestor Granelli =

Argentine oceanographer and geophysicist

Captain Nestor Cesar Luis Sanz Granelli (March 27, 1931 - May 3, 2023) was a oceanographer and geophysicist born in Buenos Aires, Argentina. He was the CEO of the first commercial hydrographic company Hydroceano Consultures in Argentina.

== Early life ==
Nestor Cesar Luis Sanz Granelli was born on March 27, 1931, in Buenos Aires, Argentina. His family came from Genoa, Italy. His father, Luiz Hermenegilds Granelli, was a graduate of the Merchant Marine School and a trained mariner and spent much of his professional time in the oil tanker business. His mother was Amelia Catalina Sanz de Granelli. He was an only child. His parents sent him to an English school, the Belgrano Day School, as that was the main language of trade in the marine business. This school taught a wide range of subjects, including piano. He spoke Italian, Spanish and English.

== Career ==
Nestor Granelli joined the Navy in 1947 when he was 16, where he gained an interest in exploring Antarctica. He was on the Argentine Navy Antarctic Task Force. He attended Columbia University in 1959. He worked with the Lamont Observatory. He spent much of his time at sea analyzing the ocean floor. He developed the first hydrophone to detect sounds underwater. In 1964, he was awarded a fellowship in the category of Earth Science associated with the Embassy of Argentina, Washington, DC from the John Simon Guggenheim Memorial Foundation.

== Personal life ==
He was married to Maria Luisa Olmedo Granelli. They were married for fifty-six years. He described the events of the Revolución Libertadora as impacting him from a young age.
