= Embassy of the United Kingdom, Buenos Aires =

Foreign embassy in Buenos Aires

Coordinates: 34.5850°S 58.3961°W

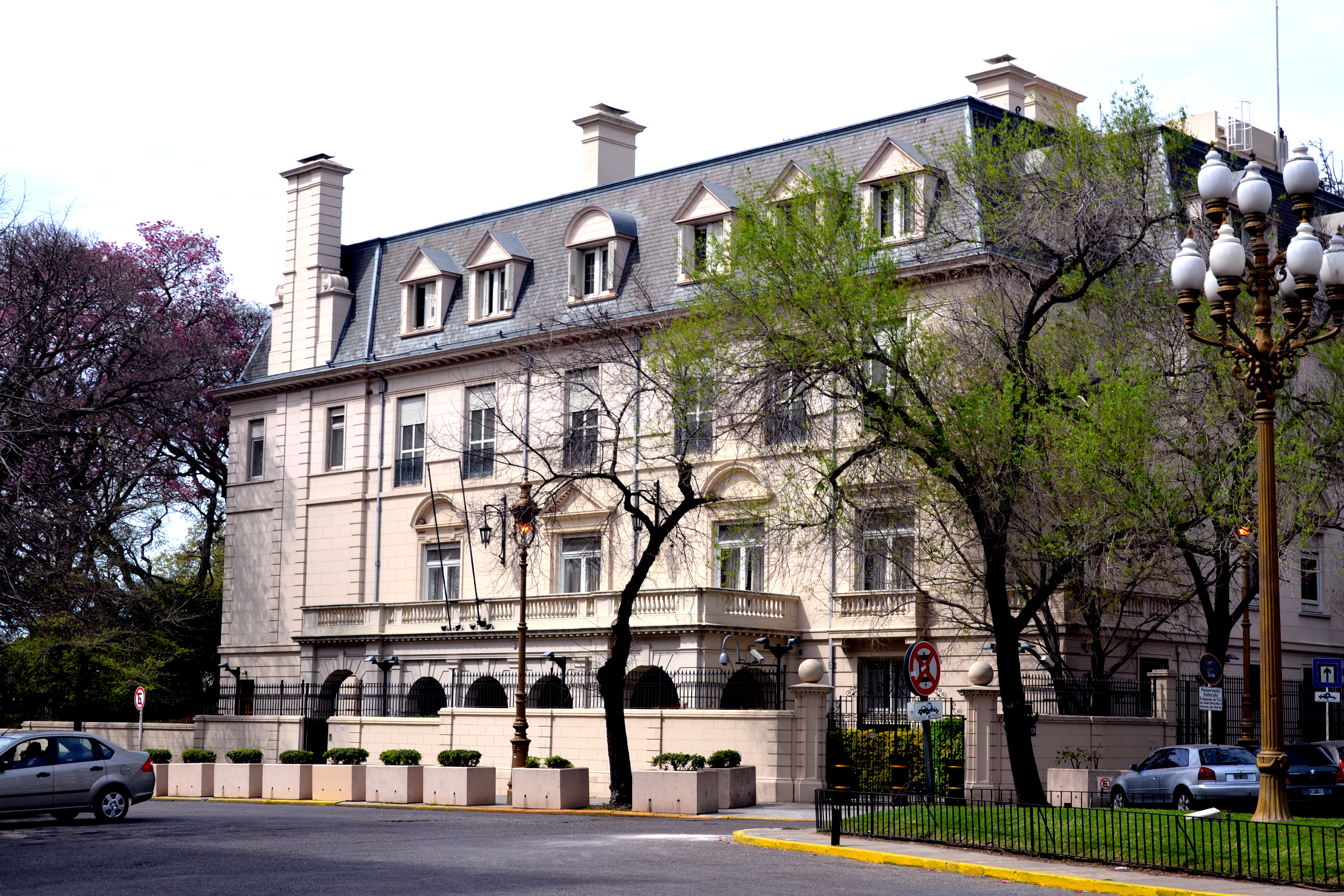
Embassy of the United Kingdom, Buenos Aires
- Location: Buenos Aires, Argentina
- Address: Dr Luis Agote 2412 (C1425EOF), Buenos Aires, Argentina
- Ambassador: Kirsty Hayes
- Website: British Embassy, Buenos Aires

The Embassy of the United Kingdom in Buenos Aires is the chief diplomatic mission of the United Kingdom in Argentina. The embassy also represents the British Overseas Territories in Argentina.

It is located on Dr Luís Agote street in the Recoleta neighbourhood. The current British Ambassador to Argentina is David Cairns.

There were previously British Consulates in the cities of Rosario, La Plata, Bahia Blanca, Santa Fe and Mendoza.

Due to the turbulent nature of Argentina–United Kingdom relations, the embassy has frequently been the site of protests against the actions of the UK government, particularly over the Falkland Islands, over which Argentina claims sovereignty.

== History ==
The British government acquired the building for use as an embassy in 1945, which had been built in 1917 as the residence of Carlos Madero, in an Edwardian style.

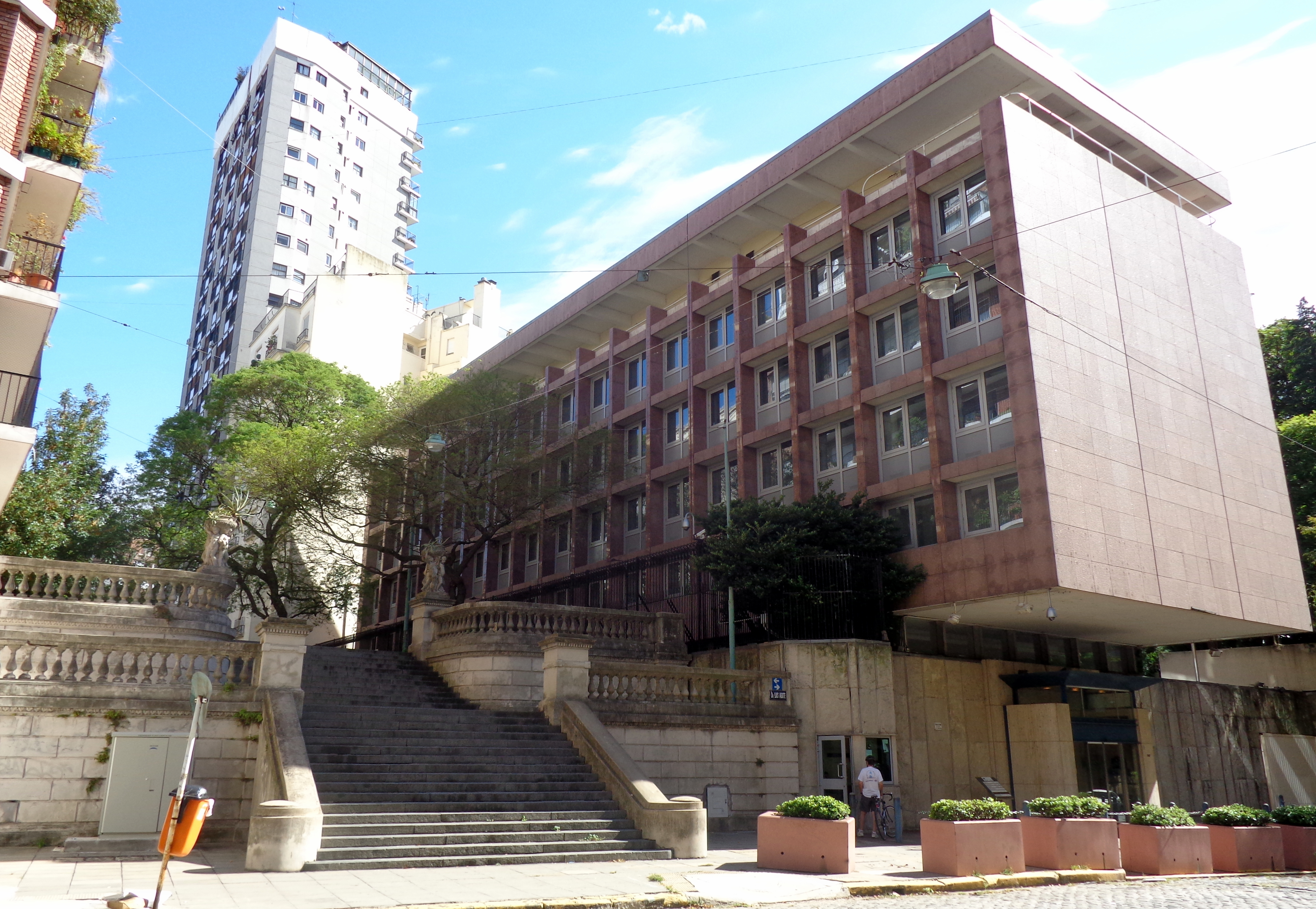
A modern addition to the British Embassy

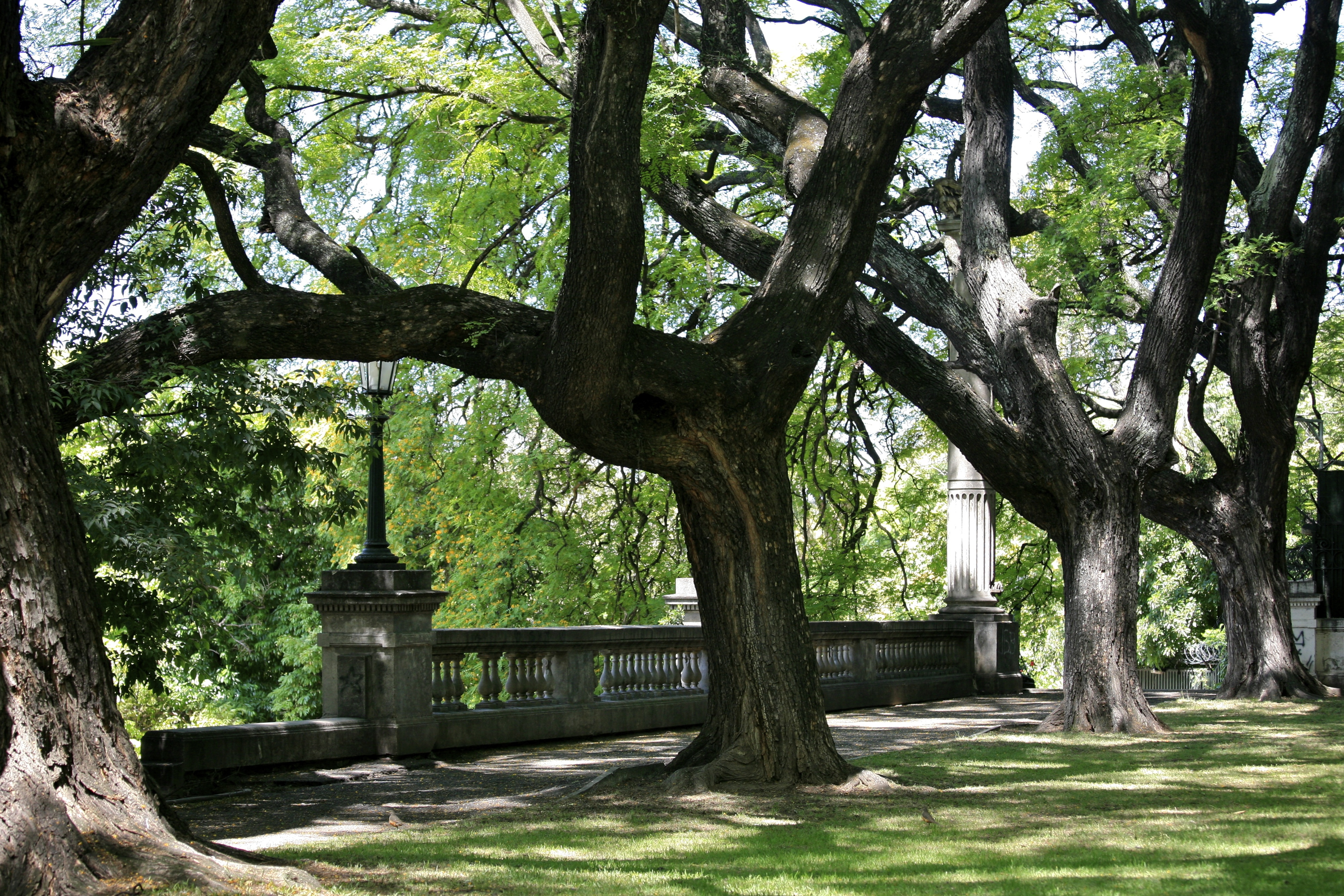
In front of the Embassy

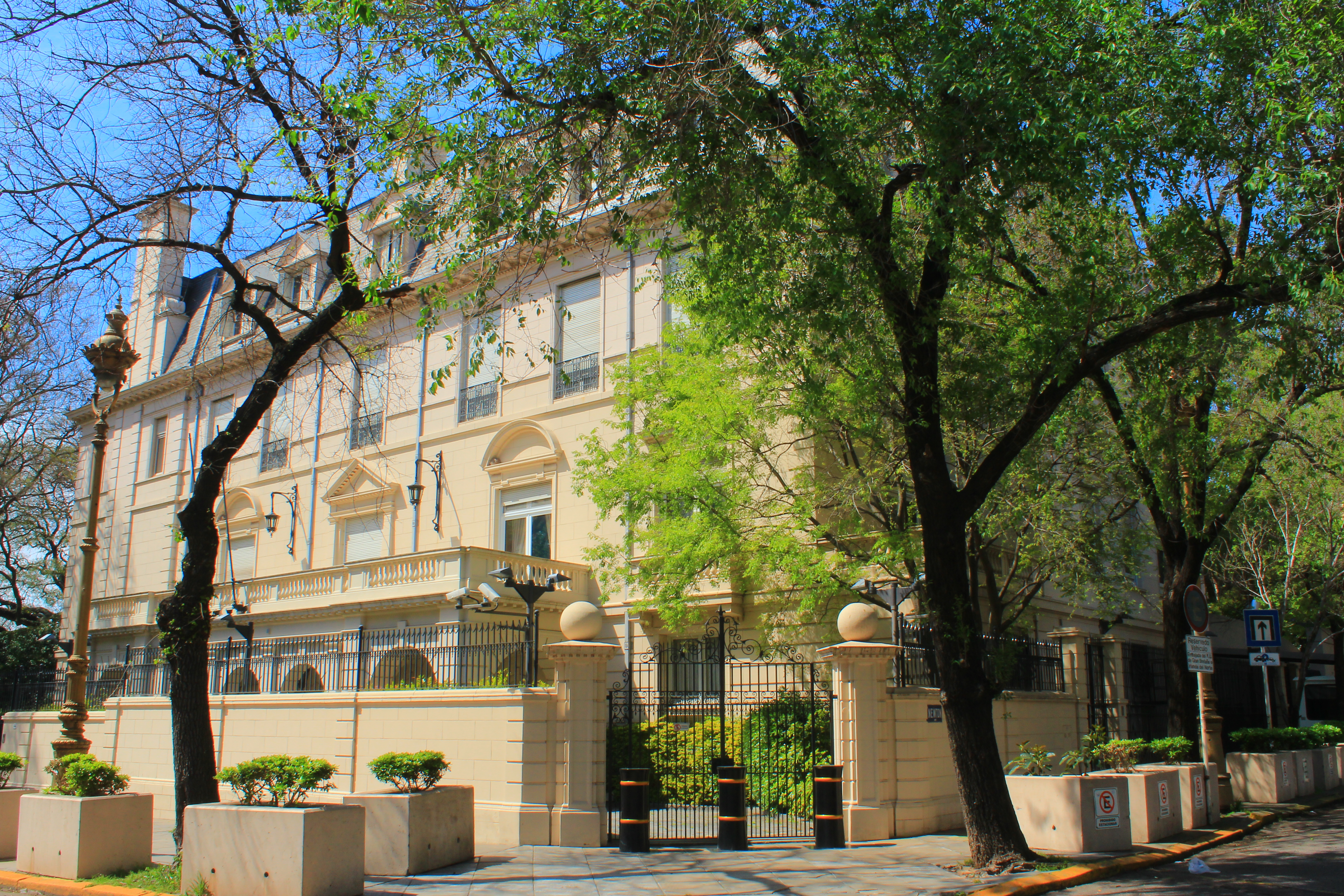
Embassy building

Between 1982 and 1990, following the Falklands War, there were no diplomatic relations between the UK and Argentina. Switzerland became the protecting power for the UK in Argentina, taking over responsibility not only for the former embassy but two consulates-general.

The former British Embassy building remained open, but was known as the British Interests Section of the Swiss Embassy in Buenos Aires and was staffed by Anglo Argentines. However, a small number of senior British diplomats remained.

The former Argentine Embassy in London came under the Brazilian flag during the same period.

Under the arrangement, the two Interests Sections were unable to have direct communications with their home governments, instead being required to communicate through their embassies of the protecting power, for example, the British Embassy in Bern, Switzerland.

Similarly, until 1989, the diplomats were unable to have direct contacts with their respective foreign ministries, instead having to go through the Swiss and Brazilian embassies.

The residence was visited by various members of the royal family, such as Prince Philip, Prince Charles, Princess Anne, Prince Andrew and Prince Harry. Diana, Princess of Wales and Richard Branson spent their stays in the city at the residence.

== See also ==
- Argentina–United Kingdom relations
- List of diplomatic missions in Argentina
- List of Ambassadors of the United Kingdom to Argentina
