= Washington School, Buenos Aires, Argentina =

Washington School

Location
- Av Federico Lacroze 2012; Belgrano, Autonomous city of Buenos Aires; Argentina; 34.5665991°S 58.44163530000003°W

Information
- Funding type: Private
- Motto: "A better child, for a better man, for a better world"
- Established: 1950
- Founder: Prof. Mercedes Mallo Drobot Palmer
- Status: Active
- Rector: Prof. Daniela Pérez
- Gender: Coeducational
- Colours: (Brunswick & White)
- Athletics: Field hockey; Athletics, Rugby union; Volleyball; Soccer
- Affiliation: Cambridge International Examinations; International Baccalaureate; Fundación Mercedes Mallo.
- Website: washington-school.com.ar

Washington School is a bilingual school (offering both English language and Spanish language) located in Belgrano, Buenos Aires, Argentina, which offers education in both elementary and secondary levels. The school also offers the International Baccalaureate and AICE programs.
