= Treaty of Friendship, Commerce and Navigation Between Argentina and the United Kingdom =

1825 treaty between Argentina and the United Kingdom

The Treaty of Amity, Commerce and Navigation between Great Britain and the United Provinces of the Río de la Plata was a bilateral treaty signed at Buenos Aires on 2 February 1825. It established a formal framework for relations between the United Kingdom and Argentina, including provisions governing commerce, navigation, consular representation, property, religious liberty and the treatment of their respective subjects and citizens.

== Background ==
Commercial relations between Britain and the Río de la Plata had expanded following the decline of Spanish colonial control. After the independence movement began in 1810, successive governments in Buenos Aires regarded British diplomatic support and recognition as major foreign-policy objectives, while Britain was principally concerned with commerce and the political stability of the new states.

In 1823, Foreign Secretary George Canning sent consuls to several new Latin American states, appointing Woodbine Parish as consul-general at Buenos Aires. Before proceeding to recognition, Canning sought assurances concerning the stability of the United Provinces and the authority of Buenos Aires to conduct foreign relations on their behalf. By late 1824, favourable reports from Parish, Britain's increasing detachment from the European Congress System and the recognition already extended by the United States contributed to the British government's decision to recognise the United Provinces.

Canning secured cabinet approval to recognise the United Provinces, together with Mexico and Colombia, in December 1824. The decision was announced in the King's speech opening Parliament on 7 February 1825 and the Treaty was ratified by the British Parliament in May 1825.

== Provisions ==
The treaty contained fifteen articles. Article I declared perpetual amity, while Articles II and III established reciprocal freedom of commerce and navigation in ports and rivers open to other foreign traders.

Articles IV to VII provided most-favoured-nation treatment for imports, exports and shipping charges, and defined the vessels entitled to the treaty's protections. Articles VIII and IX protected commercial activity, property and access to justice, while exempting resident subjects and citizens from compulsory military service, forced loans and discriminatory taxation.

Articles X and XI authorised consular appointments and protected resident merchants and their property if relations between the parties were interrupted. Article XII guaranteed British residents freedom of conscience and permitted them to maintain churches, chapels and burial grounds. Citizens of the United Provinces received corresponding rights within Britain's existing system of religious toleration.

Article XIII regulated the administration of deceased residents' property. Article XIV committed the United Provinces to prohibit participation in the slave trade, and Article XV provided for ratification and the exchange of ratifications in London.

== Significance ==
The treaty established the basis for the subsequent relationship between Britain and the United Provinces. Under its most-favoured-nation provisions, British goods could not be subjected to higher import duties than comparable goods from other foreign countries. The agreement also strengthened Britain's position in its commercial competition with the United States. The American representative in Buenos Aires subsequently sought comparable treatment for US merchants.

== Bibliography ==
- Information on the treaty at the Database of the British Foreign Office
- Treaty text (English and Spanish) at Digital Library of Treaties of the Argentine Cancillería
- Spanish Wikisource has original text related to this article: Treaty text (Spanish and English)
- Lorenzo, Celso Ramón (2000). Manual de Historia Constitucional Argentina 2. Argentina: Editorial Juris. ISBN 950-817-064-6.
