= Embassy of Argentina, London =

Embassy of Argentina in London
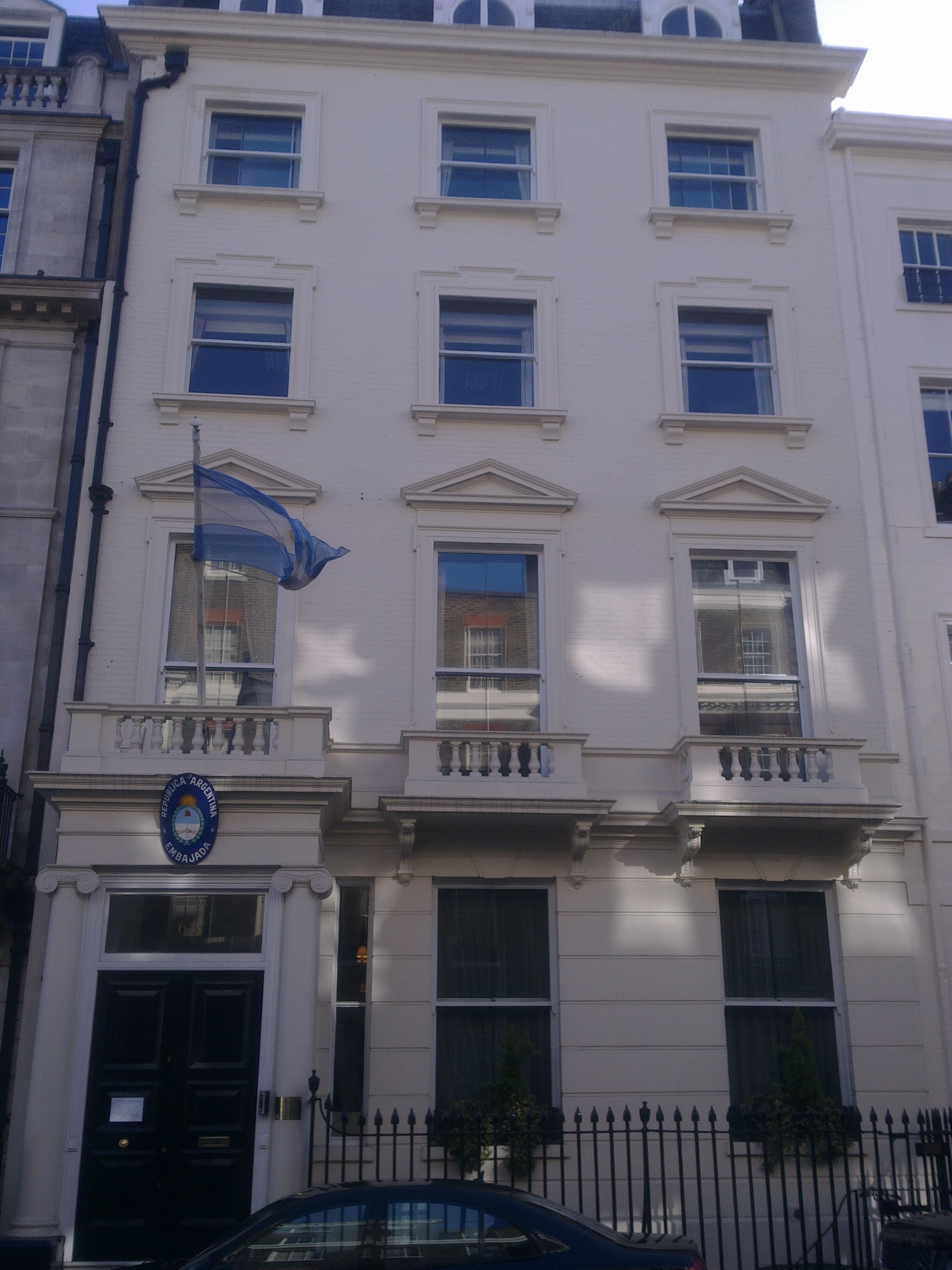
- Location: Mayfair, London
- Address: 65 Brook Street, London, W1K 4AH
- Coordinates: 51°30′44.9″N 0°8′55.5″W
- Ambassador: Javier Esteban Figueroa

The Embassy of Argentina in London is the diplomatic mission of Argentina in the United Kingdom. The entrance to the Consular Section is located around the corner at 27 Three Kings Yard. Argentina also maintains a Defence Attaché's Office at 134-136 Buckingham Palace Road, Victoria.

The Ambassador's Residence is located in a separate building in Belgravia.

== Gallery ==
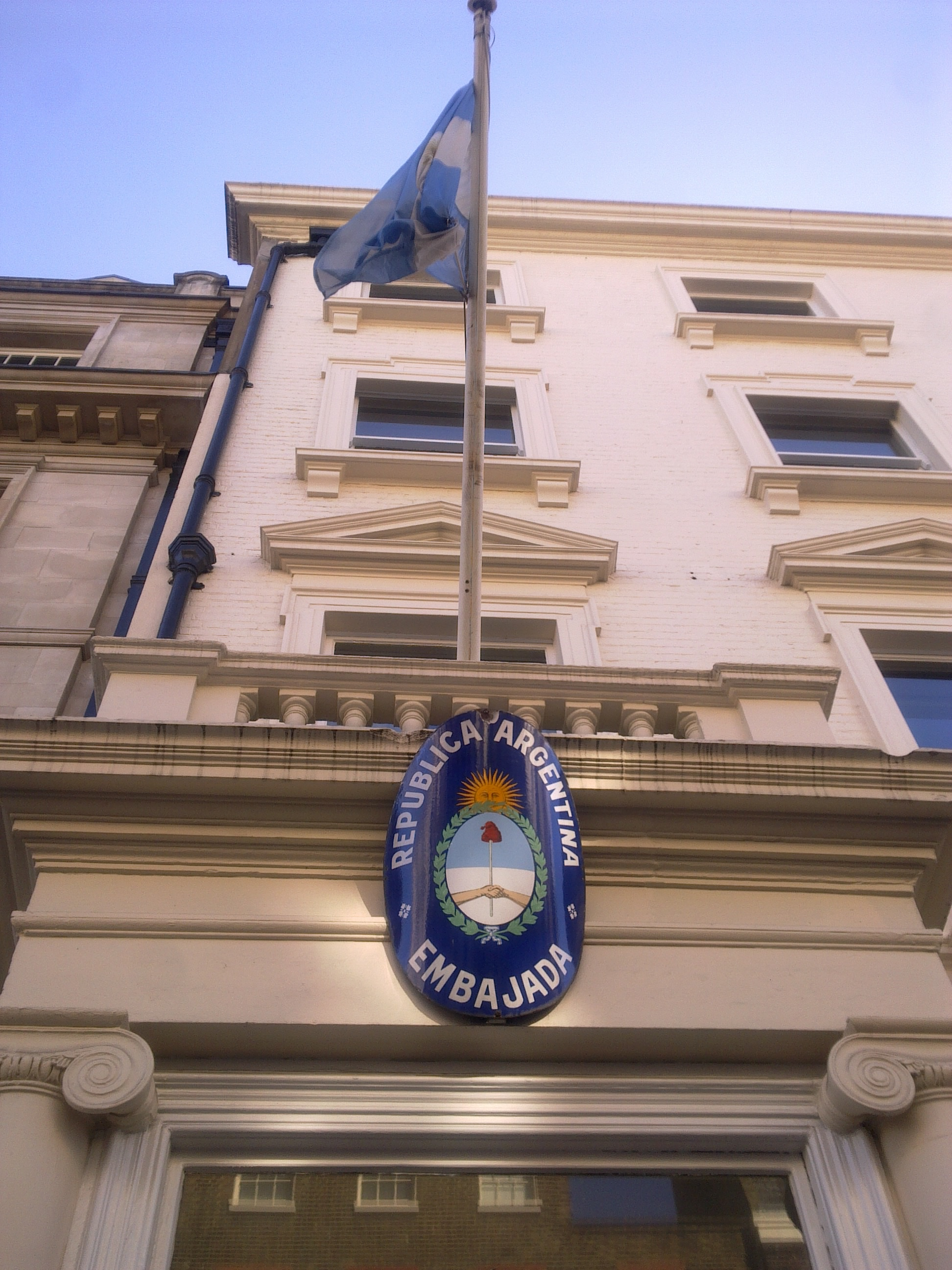
The Argentine flag and coat of arms outside the embassy

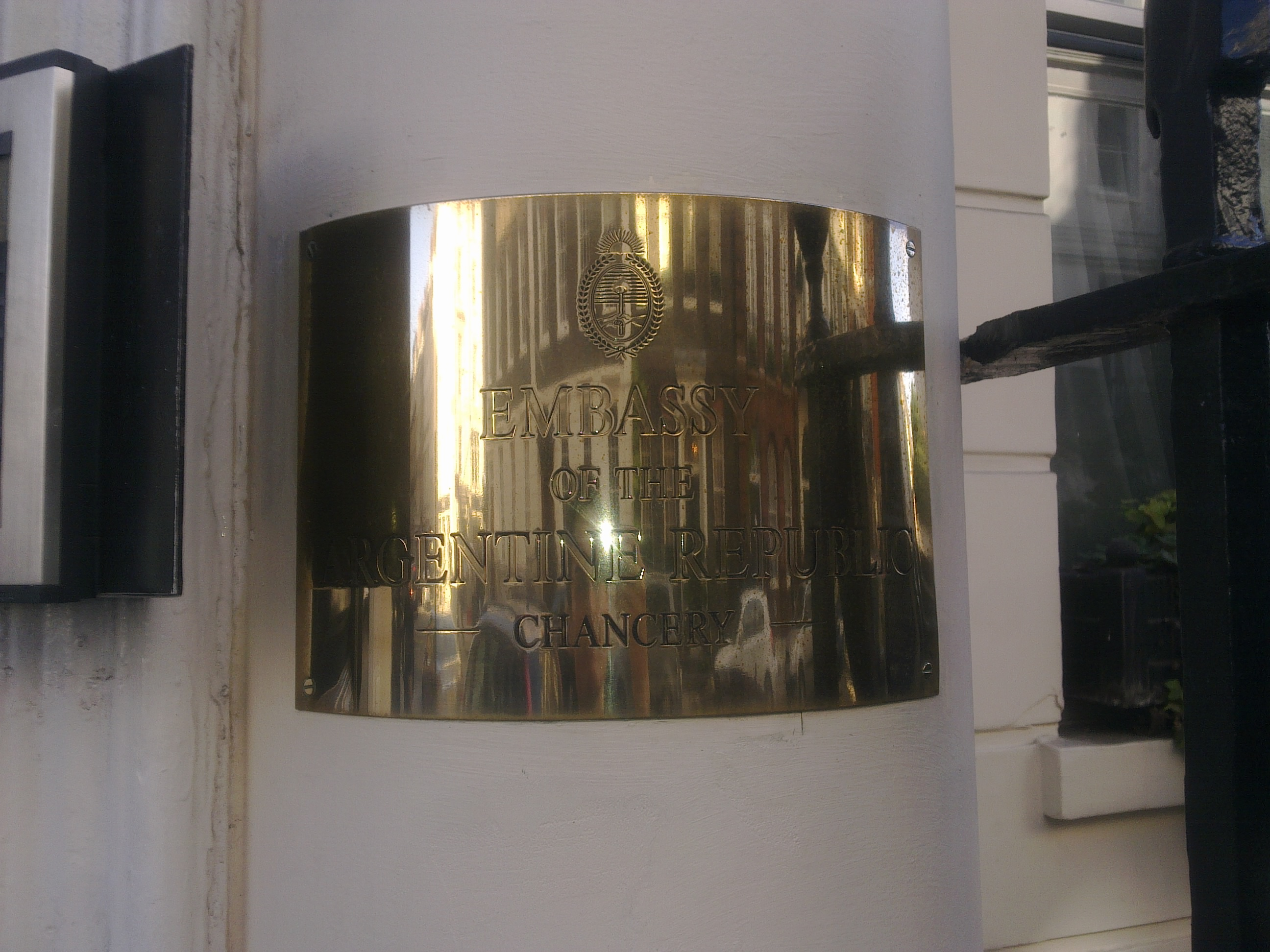
Plaque outside the embassy

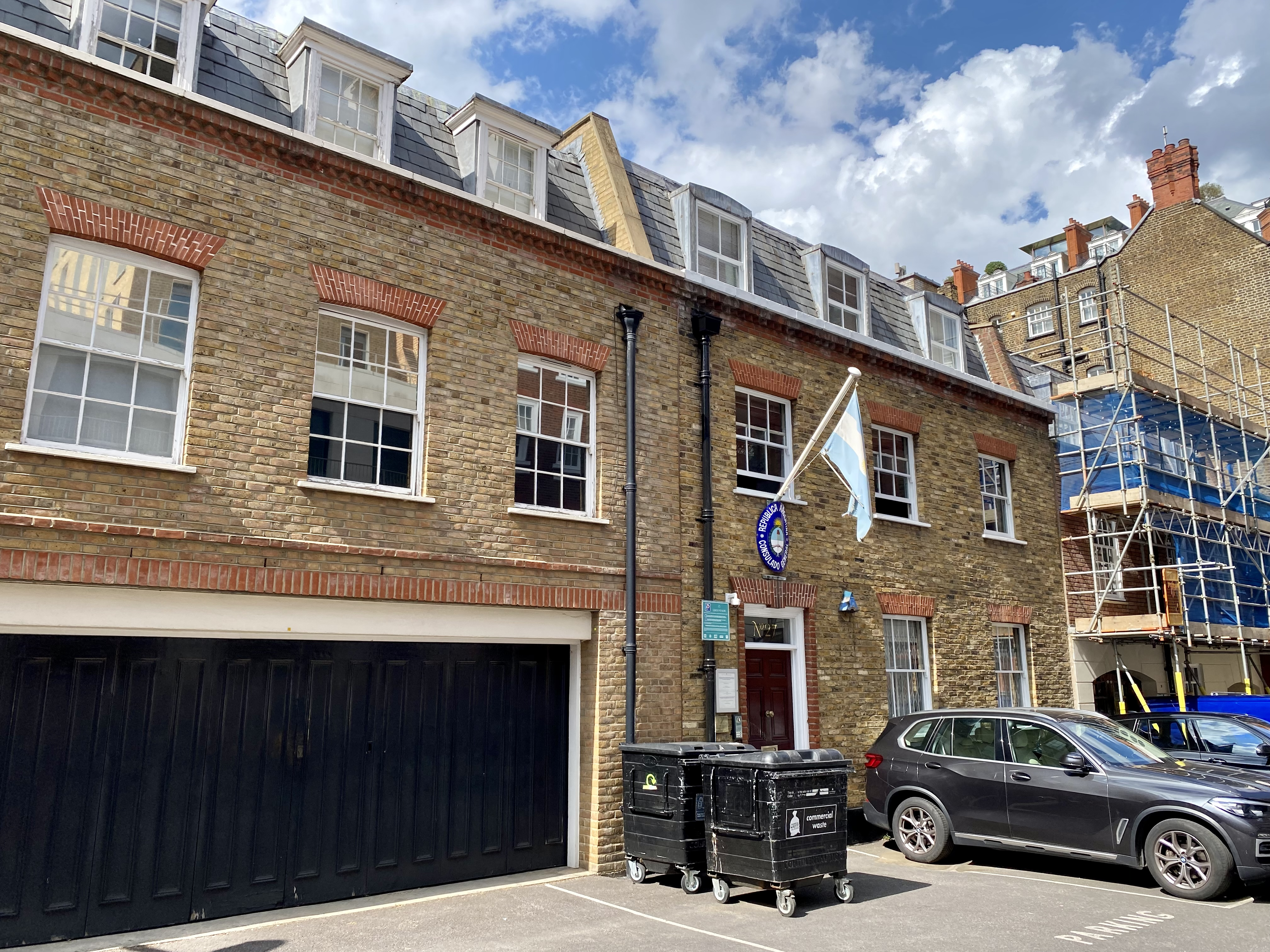
The entrance on Three Kings Yard

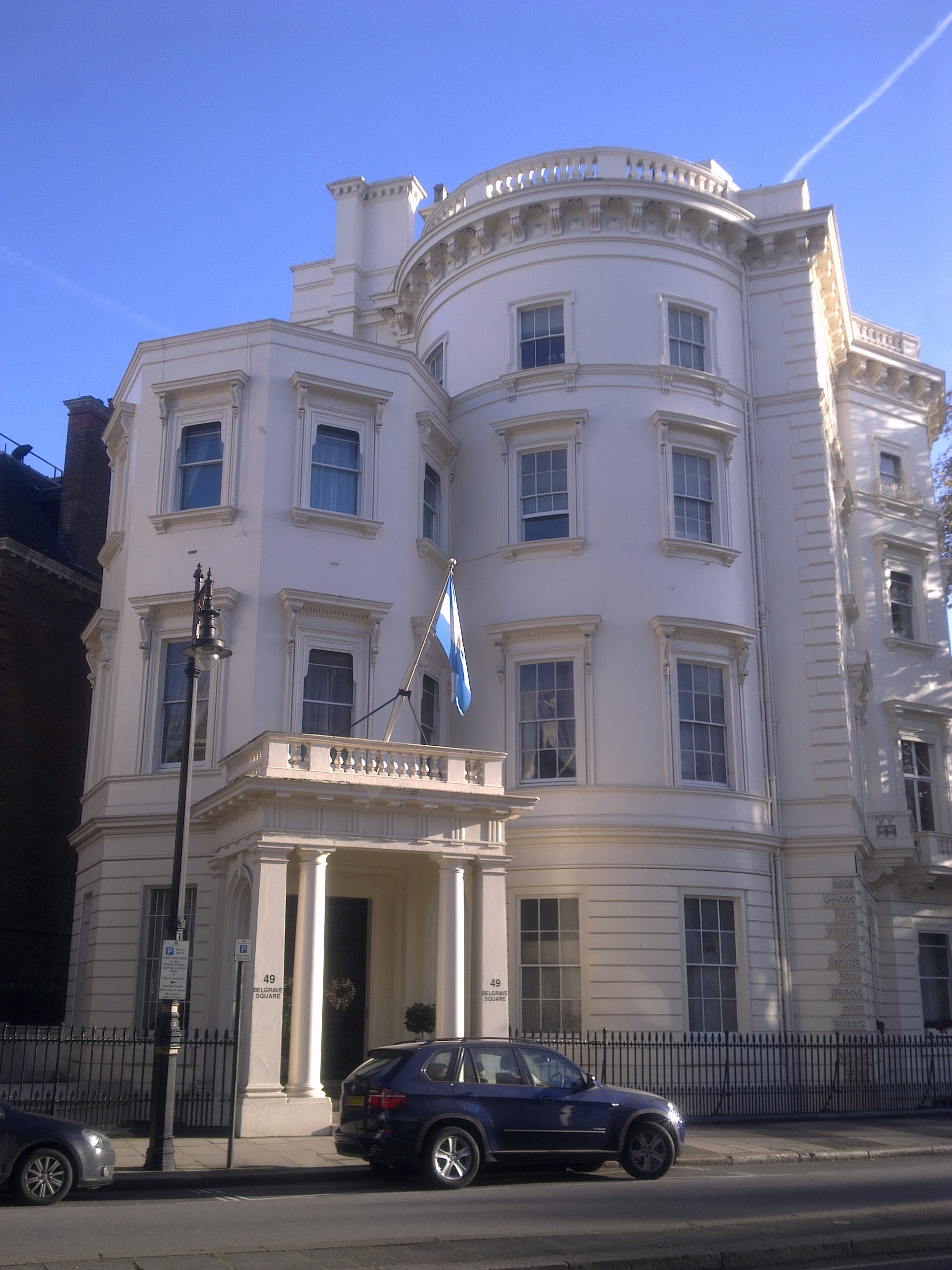
The Ambassador's residence on Grosvenor Crescent
