= Belgrano Day School =

Location
- Juramento 3035; Belgrano, Buenos Aires; Argentina

Information
- School type: Private selective bilingual mixed-sex day school
- Motto: Fac recte (Latin for "act righteously")
- Founded: 22 February 1912
- Founder: John Ernest Green
- School board: Alberto C. Taquini, Raúl Taboada
- Age: 2 to 18
- Enrollment: 1200
- Campus type: Urban
- Sports: Association football, field hockey, rugby union, volleyball
- Website: www.bds.edu.ar

Belgrano Day School is a private selective bilingual mixed-sex day school located in the Belgrano neighbourhood of Buenos Aires, Argentina.

It offers a national and international curriculum for pupils aged 2 to 18 years old. Graduates obtain the national Bilingual Baccalaureate and may optionally take the IGCSE, AICE, AS and A levels of the Cambridge International Examinations.

The school draws its pupils from a wide area of Buenos Aires, but the majority come from within the districts of Belgrano, Núñez and Palermo. All pupils in primary, middle and senior schools belong to a house, North, South, East or West, through which internal competitions are organized. The school has over one hundred teachers and support staff from Argentina and abroad.

Pupils are of all religious beliefs, however the school has a Catholic orientation. Pupils can prepare for First Communion and Confirmation and may attend monthly masses. Participation in all religious activities is optional.

== History ==
The school was founded on 22 February 1912 by English teacher John Ernest Green and began its first year with only 12 students. Over the years, it has grown into a school of more than 1000 students from kindergarten to senior school.

== Academics ==
=== Kindergarten ===
The implementation of an early English immersion programme from the age of two, led by fully bilingual teachers, is designed to develop bilingualism, social skills, creativity and self-esteem. The kindergarten has the official supervision of the Ministry of Education.

=== Primary ===
It is divided in six years, labelled P1 to P6. Students follow a mixed national-bilingual syllabus and the Cambridge International Primary Programme (CIPP) in English, science and mathematics. At the end of P6 a theatre play is prepared.

=== Middle and senior school ===
Middle school offers a debate club, a creative writing and arts workshop, a choir, the project Jóvenes Negociadores (Young Negotiators) implemented under the supervision of Fundación Poder Ciudadano, and other extracurricular activities. A psychological advisor is also present from this stage until graduation.

The preparation for the Cambridge International Examinations starts during this period.

== Games and sports ==
There are teams in association football, field hockey, rugby union and volleyball that participate in matches against other schools. Senior teams have toured Great Britain, New Zealand, Australia, South Africa and Chile. In the latter part of the school year there are athletics tournaments, including an interhouse competition.

== Facilities ==
Each section has its own building, entrance and playground. Shared facilities include rooms for music, art, computer studies and drama, a dining room, a library, a gym, laboratories, an auditorium, a fully equipped music academy and a first aid centre. The twenty-hectare sports fields are located in El Talar, with seven rugby union and mini-rugby fields, seven field hockey and mini-hockey fields, six volleyball courts, a spacious open air gym, and a snack bar.

The school buildings form the greater part of one whole square between the streets of Juramento, Zapiola, Mendoza and Conesa and all sections are connected from one playground to another.

== Alumni ==
Belgrano Day School has on record more than two thousand graduates since its foundation in 1912. Children, grandchildren and great-grandchildren of Old Facrecteans are among its pupils. Old Facrecteans prolong their link with the school through the Old Facrectean Association (OFA), take part in activities such as the BDS Club or the Old Facrectean Choir, and keep alive the Old Facrectean Newsletter that is electronically distributed twice a year. The recently published book Belgrano Day School Centennial / Centenario has mainly been written by Old Facrecteans. Notable alumni of the school include:

- Dennis Clifford Crisp, Royal Regiment of Artillery officer and World War II veteran
- Luis Dolan, interreligious consultant in the United Nations
- Matías Zaldarriaga, MacArthur Fellow
- Father Pedro Richards, adviser in the Second Vatican Council

Felipe Maestu trabaja en Estados Unidos y se graduó en dos años haciendo record Argentino
