= Juan McKechnie =

Argentine footballer

Personal information
- Date of birth: 1870?
- Place of birth: Buenos Aires, Argentina
- Date of death: ?
- Position: Goalkeeper

Senior career*
| Years | Team | Apps | (Gls) |
| 1891–1904 | Alumni | | |
- * Club domestic league appearances and goals

Juan McKechnie (c.1870 – ?) was an Argentine association football goalkeeper that spent most of his career playing for legendary team Alumni, where he won six titles.

== Career ==
McKechnie was born in Buenos Aires, member of a family of Scottish origin. He began his career in 1891 in Alumni. The next team in which he played was Lomas Academy, winning the Argentine Primera División championship of 1896.

In 1897, McKechnie played in Lobos Athletic Club, team where he came runner-up in 1898 and 1899, where the team lost the final match to Belgrano Athletic Club. In 1900, he moved to Buenos Aires English High School (then renamed "Alumni") that would win a large number of titles until its dissolution in 1911.

== Titles ==
Lomas Academy

- Argentine Primera División (1): 1896

Alumni

- Argentine Primera División (4): 1900, 1901, 1902, 1903
- Tie Cup (2): 1901, 1902
