= 1899 in association football =

The following are the association football events of the year 1899 throughout the world.

== Events ==
- January 8: FC Freiburg are champions of south Germany.
- February: German club Werder Bremen established, Knattspyrnufélag Reykjavíkur founded
- March 12: Final of first official Swiss championship, won by the Anglo-American Club de Zürich
- March 20: England defeat Wales 4–0 in Bristol.
- May 3: Hungarian club Ferencvárosi TC founded
- May 14: Uruguayan club, Club Nacional de Football is founded being the second Uruguayan football club to be founded and the first Latin American club founded by natives. German club Eintracht Frankfurt founded
- July 1: German club TSG 1899 Hoffenheim founded
- July 16: In the first match in El Salvador between two organised teams, the Santa Ana team beats a team from San Salvador, 2-0.
- August 10: Norwegian club Viking FK founded
- August 31: French club Olympique de Marseille founded
- November 29: Spanish Club FC Barcelona founded
- December 16: Italian club AC Milan founded

== National League Champions ==
=== South America ===
Nation	Tournament	Winner	Runner-up	Title
Argentina	Primera Division	Belgrano	Lobos	1st

=== Europe ===
Nation	Tournament	Winner	Runner-up	Title	Previous title won
Belgium	First Division	Liege (won 6-3 in playoff)	FC Brugeois	3rd	1898
England	First Division	Aston Villa	Liverpool	4th	1897
Ireland	Irish League	Distillery	Linfield	2nd	1896
Netherlands	Football League Championship	RAP (won 5-3 in playoff)	PW Enschede	5th	1898
Scotland	Scottish League	Rangers	Heart of Midlothian	2nd	1891

== Domestic Cups ==
=== Asia ===
Nation	Tournament	Winner	Score	Runner-up	Venue	Title
India	Durand Cup	Black Watch	2-0	Yorkshire Regiment	Annadale	3rd

=== Europe ===
Nation	Tournament	Winner	Score	Runner-up	Venue	Title	Previous title won
England	FA Cup	Sheffield United	4-1	Derby County	Crystal Palace	1st	None
France	French Football Championship	Le Havre	(Club Français refused to play).	Club Français	None	1st	None
Ireland	Irish Cup	Linfield	1-0 (match ended early)	Glentoran	Solitude	6th	1898
Italy	Football Championship	Genoa	3-1	Internazionale Torino	Ponte Carrega Sports Field	2nd	1898
Netherlands	KNVB	AVV RAP	1-0 (after extra time)	HVV Den Haag	Koekamp	1st	None
Scotland	Scottish Cup	Celtic	2-0	Rangers	Cathkin Park	2nd	1892
Sweden	Svenska Mästerskapet	Örgryte IS	4-0	Göteborgs FF	Idrottsplatsen	4th	1898
Switzerland	Swiss Serie A	Anglo-American Club	7-0	BSC Old Boys Basel	Allmend	1st	None
Wales	Welsh Cup	Druids	1-0 (replay after 2-2 draw)	Wrexham	The Hand Field	7th	1898

== International tournaments ==
- 1899 British Home Championship (March 2 – April 8, 1899)

England

== Births ==
- February 15 – Sid White, English professional footballer (d. 1968)
- March 15 – Arie Bieshaar, Dutch footballer (d. 1965)
- April 7 – Geoff Power, English professional footballer (d. 1963)
- July 11 – Frits Kuipers, Dutch footballer (d. 1943)
- July 14 – Gyula Mándi, Hungarian footballer and manager (d. 1969)
- October 30 – Georges Capdeville, French football referee (d. 1991)

== Clubs founded ==
- AC Milan
- FC Barcelona
- Viking FK
- Olympique de Marseille
- Club Nacional de Football
- Ferencvárosi TC
- Werder Bremen
- SK Rapid Wien
- Eintracht Frankfurt
- VfL Osnabrück
- AFC Bournemouth (as Boscombe)
