= 1898 in association football =

The following are the association football events of the year 1898 throughout the world.

== Events ==
- January 1: Footballing arm of Belgian club K.A.A. Gent established.
- April 5: Portsmouth founded
- May 8: Genoa become the first ever Italian national champions
- May 12: French club Tourcoing FC founded (as US Tourcoing)
- December: French club Union Sportive Boulonnaise founded at Boulogne-sur-Mer.
- Italian Football Federation is founded

== National League Champions ==
=== South America ===
Nation	Tournament	Winner	Score	Runner-up	Title	Previous title won
Argentina	Primera Division	Lomas	2-1 (after Lomas and Lobos finished level on points and a previous 1-0 Lomas win was voided)	Lobos	5th	1897

=== Europe ===
Nation	Tournament	Winner	Runner-up	Title	Previous title won
Belgium	First Division	Liege	Racing Bruxelles	2nd	1896
England	First Division	Sheffield United	Sunderland	1st	None
France	French Championship	Standard	Club Francais	4th	1897
Ireland	Irish League	Linfield	Cliftonville	5th	1895
Netherlands	Football League Championship	RAP (after 4-2 playoff win)	Vitesse	4th	1897
Scotland	Scottish League	Celtic	Rangers	4th	1896

== Domestic Cups ==
=== Asia ===
Nation	Tournament	Winner	Score	Runner-up	Venue	Title	Previous title won
India	Durand Cup	Black Watch	2-0	North Staffordshire Regiment	Annadale	2nd	1897

=== Europe ===
Nation	Tournament	Winner	Score	Runner-up	Venue	Title	Previous title won
England	FA Cup	Nottingham Forest	3-1	Derby County	Crystal Palace	1st	None
Ireland	Irish Cup	Linfield	2-0	St Columb's Hall Celtic	The Oval	5th	1895
Italy	Football Championship	Genoa	2-1 (after extra time)	Internazionale Torino	Velodrome Humbert I	1st	None
Scotland	Scottish Cup	Rangers	2-0	Kilmarnock	Cathkin Park	3rd	1897
Sweden	Svenska Mästerskapet	Örgryte IS	3-0	AIK	Gärdet	3rd	1897
Wales	Welsh Cup	Druids	2-1 (replay after 1-1 draw)	Wrexham	Cricket Field	6th	1886

== International tournaments ==
- 1898 British Home Championship (February 19 – April 2, 1898)

England

== Births ==
- January 7 – Dick MacNeill, Dutch footballer (d. 1963)
- December 13 – Percy Goodison, English professional footballer (d. 1971)
- Full date unknown
  - Joe Hughes, Welsh professional footballer

== Deaths ==
- June 30 – Reg Birkett, English footballer

== Clubs founded ==
- K.A.A. Gent
- Portsmouth FC
- BSC Young Boys
- SV Darmstadt 98
- Crosshaven AFC
