= William Leslie (footballer) =

Scottish-Argentine footballer

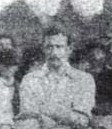

Personal information
- Place of birth: Scotland
- Place of death: Buenos Aires, Argentina
- Position: Defender

Senior career*
Years	Team	Apps	(Gls)
1891–1895	Lomas A.C.		
- * Club domestic league appearances and goals

William Leslie was a Scottish-Argentine footballer who played as a defender for Lomas Athletic Club. and the Argentina national team.

== Career ==
Leslie began his career in Lomas Athletic Club, team where he had won the first division championship 1893, and it had been the top scorer with 7 goals. Between 1900 and 1904 Leslie played in Quilmes Atlético Club.

In 1902 Leslie played in the Argentine team, who had played his first match against the Uruguay team. The match was played on 20 July 1902 in Montevideo, with a score 6–0 in favor of Argentina. Some of the Argentine goals were scored by Charles Dickinson and Juan Brown.

== Titles ==
Lomas Athletic

- Primera División: 1893, 1894, 1895, 1897, 1898

Lomas Academy

- Primera División: 1896
