= 1895 in Argentine football =

Football in Argentina
- Season: 1895

Men's football
- Primera División: Lomas

1895 in Argentine football saw Lomas successfully defended its 1894 league title establishing a league record of 3 consecutive season titles. The runner-up was its related team Lomas Academy. This was the last tournament played by Buenos Aires and Rosario Railway before merging with Belgrano Athletic Club.

== Primera división ==
=== Final standings ===
Pos	Team	Pts	G	W	D	L
1	Lomas	18	10	8	2	0
2	Lomas Academy	13	10	6	1	3
3	Flores	12	10	6	0	4
4	Retiro A.C.	7	10	3	1	6
5	English High School ^{1}	5	10	2	1	7
6	Quilmes Rovers	5	10	2	1	7

^{1} It was registered as the football team of the school. The English High School A.C. (named "Alumni" since 1900) would be established in 1898.
