= William Stirling (footballer) =

Scottish footballer

Personal information
- Full name: William Newton Stirling
- Place of birth: Scotland
- Date of death: 13 November 1914
- Place of death: at sea
- Position: Forward

Senior career*
| Years | Team | Apps | (Gls) |
| 1891–1900 | Lomas A.C. | | |
- * Club domestic league appearances and goals

William Newton Stirling (died 13 November 1914) was a Scottish football player, who played as forward for Lomas Athletic Club and Lomas Academy. He was top scorer in the championship of 1897.

== Career ==
Born in Scotland, Stirling began his career with Lomas Athletic Club in 1891. With Lomas, he won his first title in 1893. He would win a total of five championships in 1893, 1894, 1895, 1897 and 1898, always playing for Lomas.

== Death ==
Stirling had been living in La Paz, Entre Ríos, Argentina. He drowned at sea in 1914.

== Titles ==
Lomas A.C.

- Primera División (5): 1893, 1894, 1895, 1897, 1898

Lomas Academy

- Primera División (1): 1896
