= 1897 in Argentine football =

Football in Argentina
- Season: 1897

Men's football
- Primera División: Lomas

1897 in Argentine football saw Lomas win its 4th Primera División championship within 5 seasons played. Lomas won the title after winning the 2nd replay of the playoff against Lanús Athletic. The players of Lomas Academy (dissolved last year) returned to the main team.

Lanús A.C., Banfield and Palermo A.C. debuted while Belgrano A.C. registered a "B" team.

== Primera división ==
=== Final standings ===
| Pos | Team | Pts | G | W | D | L | Gf | Ga | Gd |
|---|---|---|---|---|---|---|---|---|---|
| 1 | Lomas | 20 | 12 | 9 | 2 | 1 | 55 | 9 | +46 |
| 2 | Lanús A.C. | 20 | 12 | 10 | 0 | 2 | 39 | 8 | +31 |
| 3 | Belgrano A.C. | 19 | 12 | 9 | 1 | 2 | 47 | 15 | +32 |
| 4 | Flores | 13 | 12 | 6 | 1 | 5 | 44 | 22 | +22 |
| 5 | Palermo Athletic | 8 | 12 | 4 | 0 | 8 | 11 | 50 | -39 |
| 6 | Belgrano A.C. "B" | 3 | 12 | 1 | 1 | 10 | 10 | 56 | -46 |
| 7 | Banfield | 1 | 12 | 0 | 1 | 11 | 6 | 52 | -46 |

=== Championship Playoffs ===
8 September 1897

| Lomas AC | 1-1 | Lanús AC |

12 September 1897

| Lomas AC | 0-0 | Lanús AC |

19 September 1897

| Lomas AC | 1-0 | Lanús AC |
|---|---|---|
| Willie Stirling |
