= 1897 Argentine Primera División =

6th season of top-tier football league in Argentina

Primera División
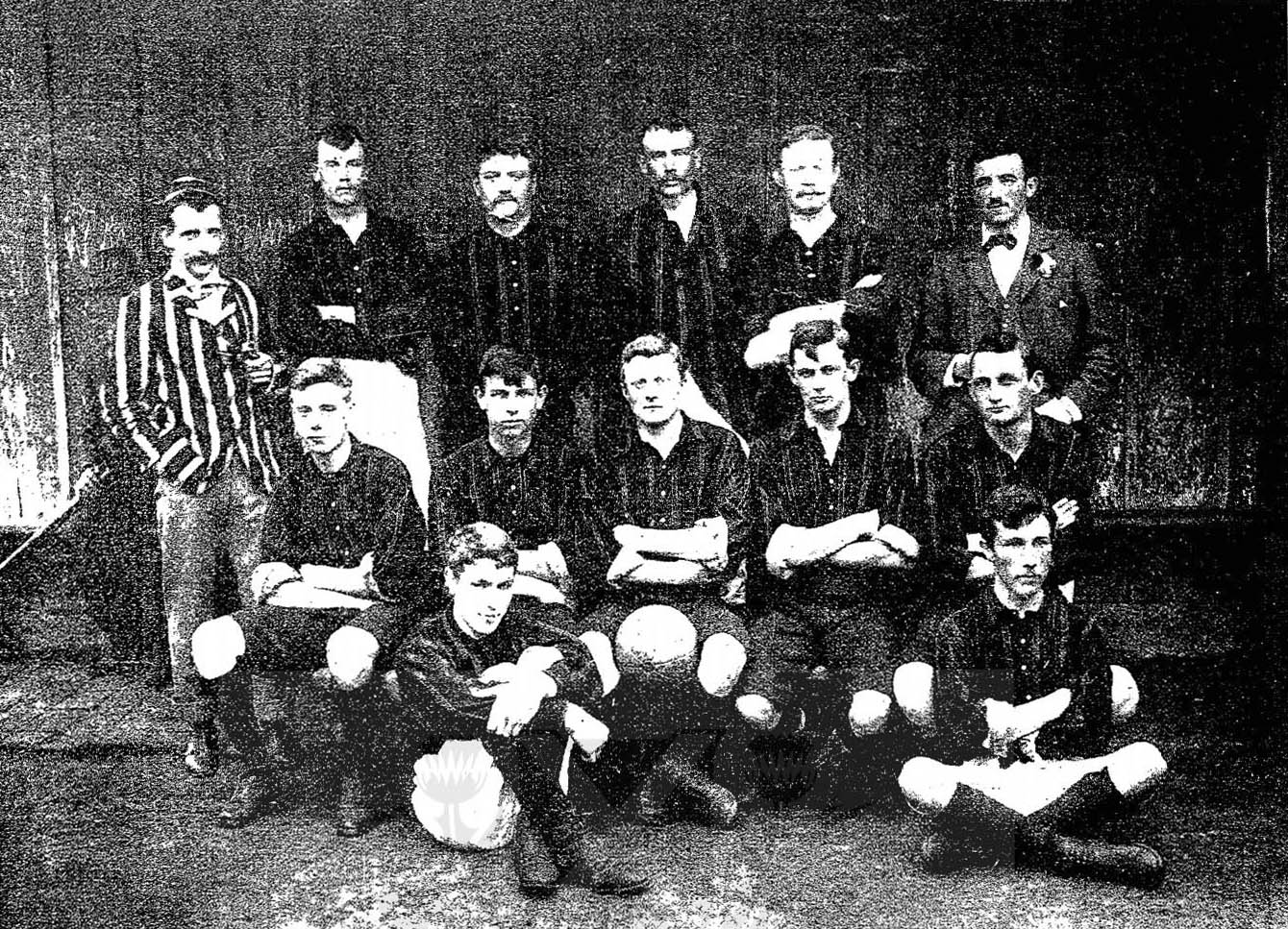
- Lomas A.C., champion
- Season: 1897
- Champions: Lomas (4th title)
- Relegated: (none)
- Matches: 44
- Top goalscorer: William Stirling (Lomas AC) (20 goals)
- Biggest home win: Belgrano AC 14-0 Palermo AC
- Biggest away win: Banfield 1-10 Flores AC

The 1897 Argentine Primera División was the 6th season of top-flight football in Argentina. The championship was won by Lomas that achieved its 4th Argentine league title in 5 seasons. Lomas won the title after beating Lanús A.C. by 1-0 in a 3rd playoff match.

The players of Lomas Academy (dissolved one year before) returned to its parent club, Lomas Athletic, while Lanús A.C., Banfield and Palermo A.C. made their debuts and Belgrano A.C. registered a "B" team to play the tournament.

== Final standings ==
Pos	Team	Pld	W	D	L	GF	GA	GD	Pts	Qualification
1	Lomas	12	9	2	1	55	9	+46	20	Championship playoff
2	Lanús A.C. (Note: Not related to Club Atlético Lanús. The Lanús A.C. (previously, "Lanús Cricket Club") had been established in 1887 and played several AFA tournaments until its dissolution in 1914.)	12	10	0	2	39	8	+31	20	Championship playoff
3	Belgrano A.C.	12	9	1	2	47	15	+32	19	
4	Flores	12	6	1	5	44	22	+22	13	
5	Palermo A.C.	12	4	0	8	11	50	−39	8	
6	Belgrano A.C. "B"	12	1	1	10	10	56	−46	3	
7	Banfield	12	0	1	11	6	52	−46	1	

== Championship final ==
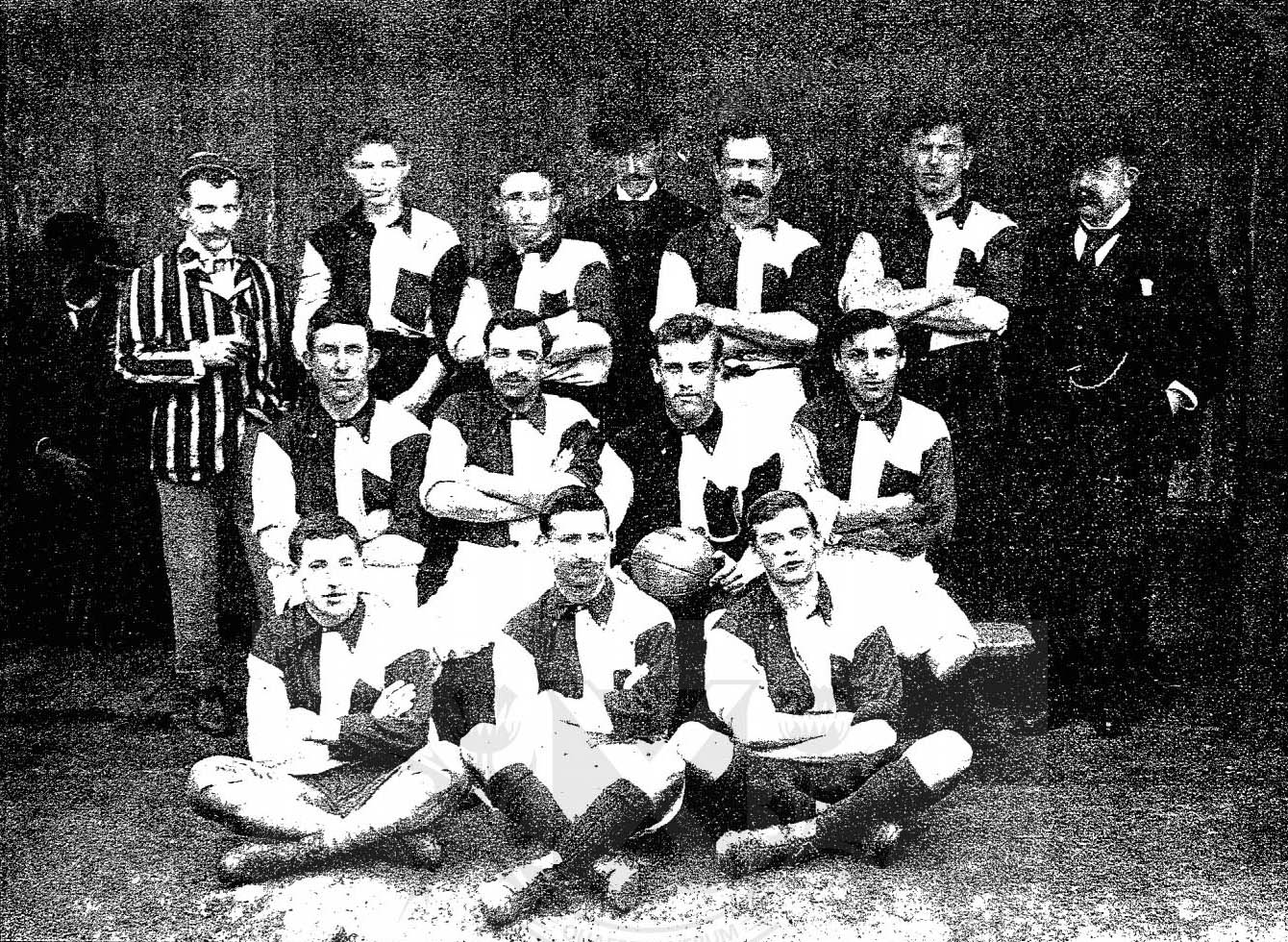
Team of Lanús A.C. that played the final

After both teams, Lomas and Lanús finished in the first position, they had to play a final to decide a champion. It finished 1–1 after extra time so a playoff was held four days later. As that match ended 0–0 with no modifications on the score during extra time, a second game was scheduled for September 19. The result was also a tie.

Finally, Lomas defeated Lanús 1–0 in the third match, becoming Primera División champion.

Type	Date	Team 1	Res.	Team 2
Playoff	8 Sep	Lomas	1–1 (a.e.t.)	Lanús A.C.
Playoff 2	12 Sep	Lomas	0–0 (a.e.t.)	Lanús A.C.
Playoff 3	19 Sep	Lomas	1–0	Lanús A.C.

=== Playoff ===
1897 Primera División Final
8 Sep 1897
Playoff

Lomas	1–1 (a.e.t.)	Lanús A.C.
Anderson (1–0)	Report 1 Report 2	Brown (1–1)

Lomas Field, Lomas de Zamora (Note: Lomas played its local games in a field located on Meeks avenue between Fonrouge street and the Hospital.)
Attendance: 1,000
Referee: Barrington B. Syer

Team details

GK	H. Ritchie
DF	A. Anderson
DF	(Scotland) William Leslie
MF	Joseph E. Wright
MF	Frederick H. Jacobs
MF	Lawrence Jacobs
FW	George Mervyn Comber
FW	Frank John Chevallier Boutell
FW	(Scotland) William Stirling
FW	James O. Anderson (c)
FW	G.E. Leslie

GK	Armando Coste
DF	Thomas Bridge (c)
DF	Walter Buchanan
MF	Italo Nóbili
MF	A. Miller
MF	W. Dunn
FW	John J. Bridge
FW	Luis Nóbili
FW	(Argentina) Jorge Brown
FW	C.P.C. Comber
FW	Héctor Munro

=== Playoff 2 ===
12 Sep 1897
Playoff 2

Lomas	0–0 (a.e.t.)	Lanús A.C.
	Report

Lomas Field, Lomas de Zamora
Attendance: 2,000
Referee: Barrington B. Syer

Team details

GK	H. Ritchie
DF	Joseph E. Wright
DF	(Scotland) William Leslie
MF	A. Anderson
MF	Frederick H. Jacobs
MF	Lawrence Jacobs
FW	George Mervyn Comber
FW	C. Gibson
FW	Frank John Chevallier Boutell
FW	(Scotland) William Stirling
FW	James O. Anderson (c)

GK	Armando Coste
DF	Thomas Bridge (c)
DF	Walter Buchanan
MF	Italo Nóbili
MF	A. Miller
MF	W. Dunn
FW	John J. Bridge
FW	Luis Nóbili
FW	(Argentina) Jorge Brown
FW	G. Minturn
FW	Charles P. Cautley Comber

=== Playoff 3 ===
19 Sep 1897
Playoff 3

Lomas	1–0	Lanús A.C.
Stirling	Report

Lomas Field, Lomas de Zamora
Referee: Barrington Bloomfield Syer

Team details

Lomas A.C.
Lanús A.C.

GK	Percy L. Grey Bridger
DF	(Scotland) William Leslie
DF	Joseph E. Wright
MF	Lawrence Jacobs
MF	Frederick H. Jacobs
MF	Arthur Anderson
FW	George Mervyn Comber
FW	Carlos Gibson
FW	James O. Anderson (c)
FW	(Scotland) William Stirling
FW	Frank John Chevallier Boutell

GK	Armando Coste
DF	Thomas Bridge (c)
DF	Walter Buchanan
MF	Italo Nóbili
MF	A. Miller
MF	W. Dunn
FW	John J. Bridge
FW	Luis Nóbili
FW	(Argentina) Jorge Brown
FW	Héctor Munro
FW	Charles P. Cautley Comber
