= 1893 in Argentine football =

Football in Argentina
- Season: 1893

Men's football
- Primera División: Lomas A.C.

1893 in Argentine football saw the first league tournament organized by current Argentine Football Association. This league had been established by Alexander Watson Hutton, considered "the father" of Argentine football. Lomas Athletic Club won its first title.

Only Buenos Aires al Rosario Railway survived from the 1891 championship.

== Primera división ==
The championship took the format of a league of 5 teams, with each team playing the other twice.

=== Argentine Association Football League ===
Pos	Team	Pts	G	W	D	L	Gf	Ga	Gd
1	Lomas AC	15	8	7	1	0	26	2	+24
2	Flores	10	8	5	0	3	19	9	+10
3	Quilmes Rovers	9	8	3	3	2	12	11	+1
4	English High School ^{1}	4	8	1	2	5	6	25	-19
5	Buenos Aires and Rosario Railway	2	8	0	2	6	3	19	-16

^{1} It was registered as the football team of the School. The English High School Athletic Club would be established in 1898.
