= 1898 Argentine Primera División =

7th season of top-tier football league in Argentina

Primera División
- Season: 1898
- Champions: Lomas (5th title)
- Promoted: Lobos; United Banks
- Relegated: (none)
- Matches: 43
- Top goalscorer: (England) T.F. Allen (Lanús A.C.) (11 goals)
- Biggest home win: Belgrano A.C. 7-1 Palermo A.C.
- Biggest away win: Palermo A.C. 0-8 Lanús A.C.

The 1898 Argentine Primera División was the 7th season of top division football in Argentina. It was won by Lomas, achieving its 5th Argentine championship in 6 seasons. The runner-up was Lobos. Flores AC and Belgrano AC "B" left the championship, being replaced by Lobos -which returned to the Association- and new team United Banks.

== Primera división ==
=== Final standings ===
Pos	Team	Pld	W	D	L	GF	GA	GD	Pts
1	Lomas (C)	12	8	4	0	20	4	+16	20
2	Lobos	12	9	2	1	21	6	+15	20
3	Belgrano A.C.	12	8	1	3	24	10	+14	17
4	Lanús A.C.	12	6	1	5	29	12	+17	13
5	United Banks	12	4	2	6	16	20	−4	10
6	Palermo A.C.	12	2	0	10	10	47	−37	4
7	Banfield	12	0	0	12	3	24	−21	0

(C) Champions

=== Championship playoff ===
Lomas and Lobos finished first with 20 points each so they had to play a match to define a champion. After the first game was declared null by the Association attending to a request by Lobos, a second match was played, with Lomas winning the title.

Aug 28, 1898

Lomas	1−0	Lobos
	Report

Barker Memorial School, Lomas de Zamora

=== Rematch ===
Sep 11, 1898

Lomas	2−1	Lobos
Anderson; Jordan	Report

Barker Memorial School, Lomas de Zamora
Referee: W. McEwen

Team details

GK	P. J. Grant
DF	Walter Stirling
DF	Joseph H. Walker
MF	Arthur Anderson
MF	Frederick Henry Jacobs
MF	Charles Williams Reynolds (c)
FW	Henry B. Anderson
FW	George Mervyn Comber
FW	James Oswald Anderson
FW	(Scotland) William Newton Stirling
FW	Frank John Chevallier Boutell

GK	Armando Coste
DF	Tomás Patricio Moore (c)
DF	Walter Buchanan
MF	T. Cavanagh
MF	Patrick M. Rath
MF	Eduardo Buchanan
FW	H. Wilson
FW	Juan José Moore
FW	Herbert Harold Jordan
FW	Eugenio F. Moore
FW	J. Negron
