= 1896 in Argentine football =

Football in Argentina
- Season: 1896

Men's football
- Primera División: Lomas Academy

1896 in Argentine football saw Lomas's attempt to win its 4th successive Primera División championship, but the title was finally won by Lomas Academy, the other team from the club, which played its last tournament so it would be dissolved. Buenos Aires and Rosario Railway merged with Belgrano Athletic Club, which debuted that season.

== Primera división ==
The championship took the format of a league of 5 teams, with each team playing the other twice.

=== Argentine Association Football League ===
Pos	Team	Pts	G	W	D	L	Gf	Ga	Gd
1	Lomas Academy	12	8	6	0	2	18	10	+8
2	Flores	10	8	5	0	3	17	8	+9
3	Lomas	9	8	4	1	3	16	11	+5
4	Belgrano A.C.	8	8	3	2	3	10	15	-5
5	Retiro AC	1	8	0	1	7	6	23	-17
