= 1903 in Argentine football =

Football in Argentina
- Season: 1903

Men's football
- Primera División: Alumni
- Segunda División: Barracas A.C. II
- Tercera División: Estudiantes (BA) III

1903 in Argentine football saw champion Alumni win its fourth consecutive league championship. On 26 July 1903 Alumni lost its first league game in four years. Flores A.C., which had left the Association in 1898, returned to the competition under the name "Club Atlético de Flores".

== Primera División ==
The championship was expanded to a 6 team league format in 1903, with each team playing the other twice. In February 1903 the association changed its name from "The Argentine Association Football League" to "Argentine Football Association"

=== Final standings ===
Pos	Team	Pts	G	W	D	L	Gf	Ga	Gd
1	Alumni	18	10	9	0	1	40	4	+36
2	Belgrano AC	15	10	7	1	2	21	11	+10
3	Barracas Athletic	11	10	5	1	4	22	13	+9
4	Lomas AC	8	10	2	4	4	17	17	+0
5	Quilmes	8	10	3	2	5	14	22	-8
6	Flores	0	10	0	0	10	2	49	-47

== Lower divisions ==
=== Primera B ===
- Champion: Barracas A.C. II

=== Copa Bullrich ===
- Champion: San Martín A.C.

=== Primera C ===
- Champion: Estudiantes (BA) III

== International cup ==
=== Tie Cup ===
- Champion: (Argentina) Alumni

==== Final ====
16 Aug 1903

Alumni (Argentina)	3-2 (aet)	(Argentina) Rosario A.C.
	Report

Sociedad Sportiva Argentina
Referee: R.W. Rudd

== Argentina national team ==
=== Results ===
Date	Venue/City	Rival	Score	Scorers	Comp.	Report
13 September 1903	Buenos Aires	Uruguay	2-3	J. Brown (2)	Friendly	
