= Lanús Athletic Club =

Argentine sports club

Lanús
- Full name: Lanús Athletic Club
- Founded: 1887
- Dissolved: 1914; 112 years ago
- Ground: Remedios de Escalada
- League: Primera División
- 1914: None (matches annulled)
Home colours

Lanús Athletic Club was an Argentine sports club located in the Remedios de Escalada district of Lanús Partido, established by employees of railway company Buenos Aires Great Southern Railway.

While initially established as a cricket club, Lanús later added a football team. That squad competed officially during the first years of football in Argentina, playing in the top division, Primera División, from 1897 to 1899, and then returning in 1913 before being dissolved in 1914.

Along with other clubs that practised football in Lanús Partido (such as Lanús United and Talleres de Remedios de Escalada), Lanús A.C. is considered a predecessor (but not related to) of Club Atlético Lanús, founded in 1915.

== History ==
The club was established by employees of the Buenos Aires Great Southern Railway (BAGSR), a British-origin company that operated in the country, at the end of 1887 to play cricket. The club, named "Barracas Instituto Cricket Club", changed to "Lanús Cricket Club" in September 1888. In June 1895, a meeting of members gave their approval to rename the club as "Lanús Athletic Club" to include other sports such as football. The club registered to the Argentine Football Association that same year.

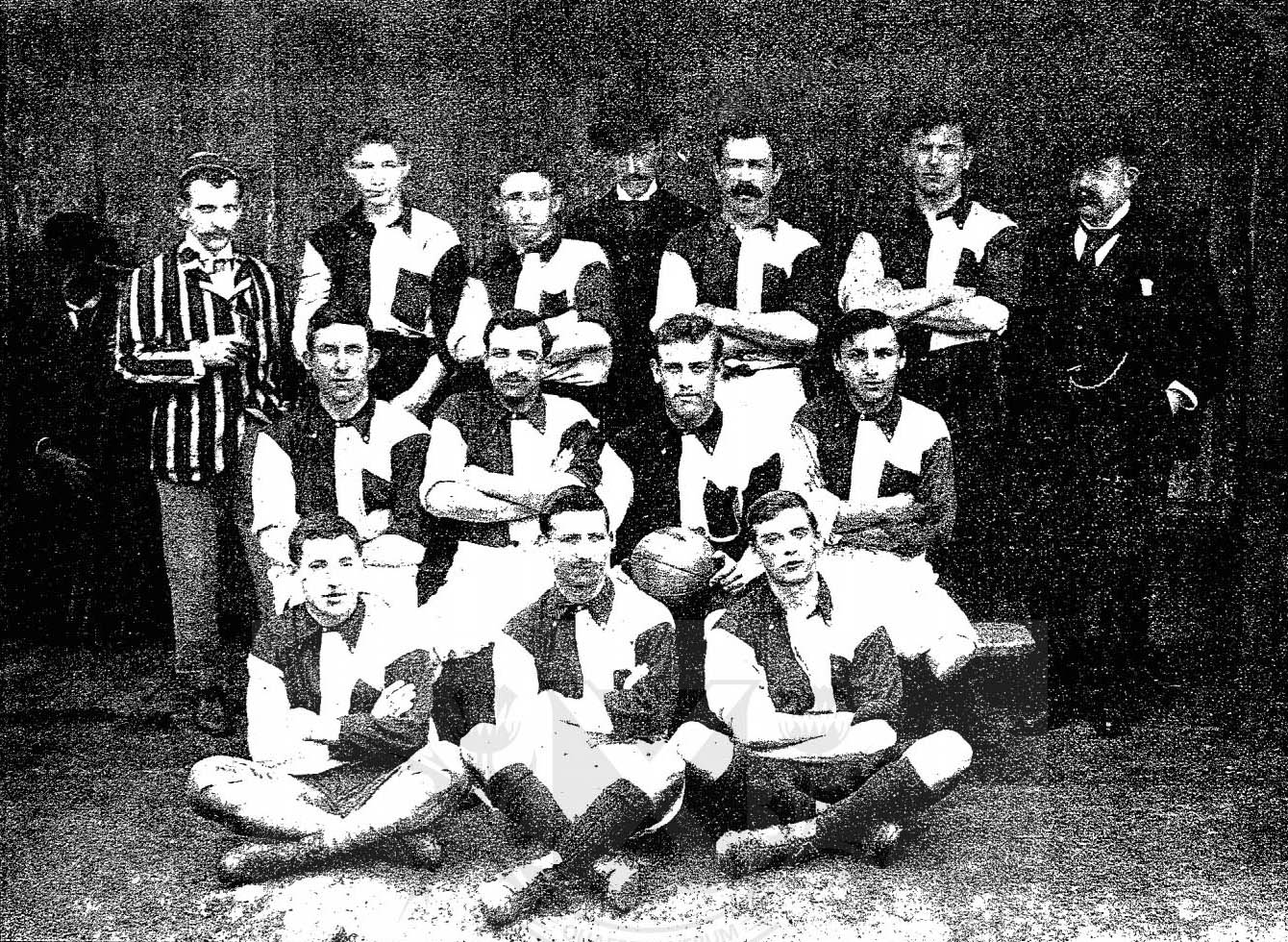
Lanús A.C. team of 1897

Lanús played its home games at the BAGSR workshops (Los Talleres, today Remedios de Escalada neighborhood). In its first year in official competitions (which was also Lanús' best performance during its short tenure on Primera) was in 1897, when the team shared the first position with Lomas Athletic Club after winning 10 matches and lost 2, so both teams had to play a final game in order to decide a champion. As the playoff ended in a draw, a second game was scheduled. It also ended in a draw so a third match had to be played. Finally, Lomas beat Lanús 10 with goal by William Stirling. After a poor campaign in 1899, Lanús disaffiliated after playing only two matches in the season.

In August 1908 the club changed its name again, becoming "Buenos Aires Great Southern Railway Athletic Club", and then "Club Atlético del Ferrocarril Gran Sud" (Spanish translation of the BAGSR). The club affiliated again to the AFA in 1910 and competed in the Segunda División tournament. In 1911, due to a restructuring, it was relegated along with the Segunda División to the third level. In 1913, it was promoted to the Primera División, where the team took part in the 1913 and 1914 Primera División championships and some national cups such as Copa de Competencia (1913–14) and Copa de Honor (1913), with poor campaigns, having been eliminated in first stage in all of them.

In its return to Primera División, Ferrocarril del Sud finished 13th of 15 in 1913, and only played seven matches in 1914 before disaffiliating again. As a result, all FDS' matches were annulled. The club was dissolved soon after. Its last official match had been on July 19, 1914, a 0–4 defeat to Belgrano A.C. at Virrey del Pino.

== Notable players ==
Jorge Brown played for Lanús A.C. from 1897 to 1899 before joining Alumni, where he would spend the most of his career. Brown won a total of 21 titles playing for Alumni and Quilmes. Brown also captained the Argentina national team between 1908 and 1913.

Walter Buchanan, a back that also played for Alumni and Belgrano and the Argentina national team, was another footballer playing for Lanús A.C.
