= 1899 Argentine Primera División =

8th season of top-tier football league in Argentina

Primera División
- Season: 1899
- Champions: Belgrano A.C. (1st title)
- Relegated: (none)
- Matches played: 12
- Top goalscorer: (England) Percy Hooton (Belgrano A.C.) (3 goals)
- Biggest home win: Belgrano A.C. 4-1 Lomas AC
- Biggest away win: Palermo AC 0-8 Lanús A.C.

The 1899 Primera División was the 8th season of top-flight football in Argentina. The season began on May 14 and ended on September 9.

The league was reduced to only 4 teams after Palermo A.C., United Banks and Banfield left the Association. Banfield registered to the recently created Segunda División. Belgrano A.C. won its first Primera División title.

Lanús A.C. only completed 2 games, with the other 4 fixtures being awarded to their opponents. The game between Lomas and Lobos was awarded to Lobos.

== Final table ==
Pos	Team	Pld	W	D	L	GF	GA	GD	Pts
1	Belgrano A.C. (C)	6	5	1	0	10	2	+8	11
2	Lobos	6	4	1	1	4	2	+2	9
3	Lomas	6	1	1	4	2	8	−6	3
4	Lanús A.C.	6	0	1	5	1	3	−2	1

(C) Champions
