= 1898 in Argentine football =

Football in Argentina
- Season: 1898

Men's football
- Primera División: Lomas

1898 in Argentine football saw Lomas win its 5th Primera División championship within 6 seasons. The runner-up was Lobos. Flores and Belgrano A.C. "B" left the championship, being replaced by Lobos which returned to the Association.

A new team, United Banks, debuted in the league.

== Primera división ==
=== Final standings ===
Pos	Team	Pts	G	W	D	L	Gf	Ga	Gd
1	Lomas	20	12	8	4	0	20	4	+16
2	Lobos	20	12	9	2	1	21	6	+15
3	Belgrano A.C.	17	12	8	1	3	24	10	+14
4	Lanús A.C.	13	12	6	1	5	29	12	+17
5	United Banks	10	12	4	2	6	16	20	-4
6	Palermo A.C.	4	12	2	0	10	10	47	-37
7	Banfield	0	12	0	0	12	3	24	-21

=== Championship playoff ===
Lomas and Lobos finished first with 20 points each so they had to play a match to define a champion. After the first game was declared null by the Association attending to a request by Lobos, a second match was played, winning Lomas the title.

28 August 1898

Lomas	1-0	Lobos

11 September 1898

Lomas	2-1	Lobos
