= Sid White =

English footballer

Personal information
- Full name: Sidney Ernest White
- Date of birth: 15 February 1899
- Place of birth: Tottenham, England
- Date of death: 1968 (aged 68–69)
- Height: 5 ft 10 1/2 in (1.79 m)
- Position: Left half

Senior career*
Years	Team	Apps	(Gls)
- Edmonton Ramblers
1923–1926	Tottenham Hotspur	20	(0)
- * Club domestic league appearances and goals

Sidney Ernest White (15 February 1899 – 1968) was an English professional footballer who played for Edmonton Ramblers and Tottenham Hotspur.

== Football career ==
White began his career at the local Non league team Edmonton Ramblers. The left half joined Tottenham Hotspur in 1923 and made a total of 22 appearances in all competitions for the Lilywhites between 1923 and 1926.
