= 1901 in Argentine football =

Football in Argentina
- Season: 1901

Men's football
- Primera División: Alumni
- Segunda División: Barracas A.C.
- Tercera División: Alumni III

1901 in Argentine football saw champion English High School changing its name to "Alumni Athletic Club", due to a regulation from the Association stating that football teams were not allowed to name the same as the Schools they belonged to.

The new denomination was inspired by the Alumni Associations of the United States, formed by ex-students who wanted to keep the ties of friendship with their old schoolmates. Under its new name Alumni retained the Argentine championship by winning all six of its games.

== Primera División ==
The championship continued with the 4 team league format, with each team playing the other twice.

=== Final standings ===
Pos	Team	Pts	G	W	D	L	Gf	Ga	Gd
1	Alumni	12	6	6	0	0	10	1	+9
2	Belgrano AC	6	6	3	0	3	14	9	+5
3	Quilmes	4	6	2	0	4	9	15	-6
4	Lomas AC	2	6	1	0	5	3	11	-8

== Lower divisions ==
=== Primera B ===
- Champion: Barracas Athletic

=== Primera C ===
- Champion: Alumni III

== International cup ==
=== Tie Cup ===
- Champion: (Argentina) Alumni

==== Final ====
25 August 1901

Alumni (Argentina)	2-1	(Argentina) Rosario AC
	Report

Lomas AC

== Argentina national team ==
The Argentina national team made its debut with a 3-2 win against Uruguay in Montevideo. This is considered the first game played ever by Argentina.

=== Friendly matches ===
Date	Venue/City	Rival	Score	Scorers	Comp.	Report
16 May 1901	Montevideo	Uruguay	3-2	Leslie, Dickinson, Anderson	Friendly	
