= 1898–99 Scottish Football League =

Scottish football season

Statistics of the Scottish Football League in season 1898–99.

== Overview ==
Rangers were winners of the Scottish Division One.

Kilmarnock won the Scottish Division Two for the second season in a row.

== Scottish League Division One ==
Pos	Team	Pld	W	D	L	GF	GA	GD	Pts	Qualification or relegation
1	Rangers (C)	18	18	0	0	79	18	+61	36	Champions
2	Heart of Midlothian	18	12	2	4	56	30	+26	26	
3	Celtic	18	11	2	5	51	33	+18	24	
4	Hibernian	18	10	3	5	42	43	−1	23	
5	St Mirren	18	8	4	6	46	32	+14	20	
6	Third Lanark	18	7	3	8	33	38	−5	17	
7	Clyde	18	4	4	10	23	48	−25	12	
7	St Bernard's	18	4	4	10	30	37	−7	12	
9	Partick Thistle (R)	18	2	2	14	19	58	−39	6	Relegated to the 1899–1900 Scottish Division Two
10	Dundee	18	1	2	15	23	65	−42	4	

Source: statto.com
Rules for classification: Teams finish equal if level on points. Points system: 2 points for a win, 1 point for a draw, 0 points for a loss
(C) Champions; (R) Relegated

== Scottish League Division Two ==
Pos	Team	Pld	W	D	L	GF	GA	GD	Pts	Promotion or relegation
1	Kilmarnock (C, P)	18	14	4	0	73	24	+49	32	Promoted to the 1899–1900 Scottish First Division
2	Leith Athletic	18	12	3	3	63	38	+25	27	
3	Port Glasgow Athletic	18	12	1	5	75	51	+24	25	
4	Motherwell	18	7	6	5	41	40	+1	20	
5	Airdrieonians	18	6	3	9	36	46	−10	15	
5	Hamilton Academical	18	7	1	10	48	58	−10	15	
7	Ayr	18	5	3	10	35	51	−16	13	
7	Morton	18	6	1	11	36	42	−6	13	
9	Linthouse	18	5	1	12	29	62	−33	11	
10	Abercorn	18	4	1	13	41	65	−24	9	

Source: statto.com
Rules for classification: Teams finish equal if level on points. Points system: 2 points for a win, 1 point for a draw, 0 points for a loss.
(C) Champions; (P) Promoted

== See also ==
- 1898–99 in Scottish football
