= Geoff Power =

English footballer

Personal information
- Full name: Geoffrey Frank Power
- Date of birth: 7 April 1899
- Place of birth: Grangetown, Cleveland, England
- Date of death: 22 January 1963
- Place of death: Cleveland, England
- Height: 5 ft 6 1/2 in (1.69 m)
- Position: Inside forward

Senior career*
Years	Team	Apps	(Gls)
1918–1920	Grangetown St Mary's		
1920–1921	Sunderland	10	(0)
1921–1922	Blackpool	16	(6)
1922–1923	Darwen		
1923–1924	Fleetwood		
1924–1925	Denaby United		
1925–1926	Eston United		
1926–1927	Scarborough		
1927–19??	Grangetown St Mary's		
- * Club domestic league appearances and goals

Geoffrey Frank Power (7 April 1899 – 1963) was an English professional footballer who played as an inside forward for Sunderland.
