= Percy Goodison =

English footballer

Personal information
- Date of birth: 1898
- Place of birth: Burnley, England
- Date of death: 1971 (aged 72–73)
- Position: Inside forward

Senior career*
Years	Team	Apps	(Gls)
1911–1912	Burnley	1	(0)
	Accrington Stanley	?	(?)
- * Club domestic league appearances and goals

Percy Goodison (1898–1971) was an English professional footballer who played as an inside forward.

Goodison was signed by Football League Second Division club Burnley in 1911. He played just one league game for the Clarets before he transferred to nearby Accrington Stanley a year later.
