= 1896 Argentine Primera División =

5th season of top-tier football league in Argentina

Primera División
- Season: 1896
- Dates: 10 May – 15 August
- Champions: Lomas Academy (1st title)
- Relegated: (none)
- Matches played: 21
- Top goalscorer: (England) Thomas Fearnley Allen (Flores AC) (Argentina) Juan Anderson (Lomas) (7 goals each)
- Biggest home win: Lomas Academy 6−1 Belgrano A.C.
- Biggest away win: Retiro A.C. 0−5 Lomas

The 1896 Primera División was the 5th season of top-flight football in Argentina. The season began on May 10 and ended on August 15. The championship took the format of a league of 5 teams, with each team playing each other twice.

The title was won by Lomas Academy, the second team of Lomas Athletic Club, which played its last tournament being then dissolved. Buenos Aires and Rosario Railway merged with Belgrano Athletic Club which debuted that season.

== Final table ==
Pos	Team	Pld	W	D	L	GF	GA	GD	Pts
1	Lomas Academy (C)	8	6	0	2	18	10	+8	12
2	Flores	8	5	0	3	17	8	+9	10
3	Lomas	8	4	1	3	16	11	+5	9
4	Belgrano A.C.	8	3	2	3	10	15	−5	8
5	Retiro A.C.	8	0	1	7	6	23	−17	1

(C) Champions
