= 1895 Argentine Primera División =

4th season of top-tier football league in Argentina

Primera División
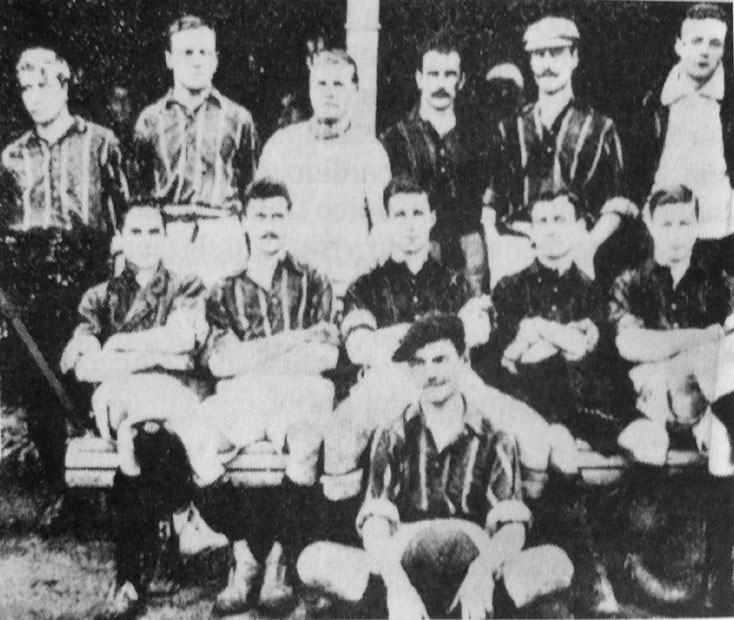
- Lomas A.C., champion
- Season: 1895
- Dates: 10 May – 30 August
- Champions: Lomas (3rd title)
- Relegated: (none)
- Matches played: 30
- Biggest home win: Lomas Academy 3−0 Retiro A.C.
- Biggest away win: Retiro A.C. 0−5 Quilmes Rowers
- Highest scoring: Lomas Academy 2−5 Lomas

The 1895 Primera División was the 4th season of top-flight football in Argentina. The season began on May 10 and ended on August 30.

Lomas won the tournament achieving its 3rd consecutive title. The runner-up was Lomas Academy, a second team from the same institution. This was the last tournament played by Buenos Aires and Rosario Railway before merging with Belgrano Athletic Club.

== Final table ==
Pos	Team	Pld	W	D	L	Pts
1	Lomas (C)	10	8	2	0	18
2	Lomas Academy	10	6	1	3	13
3	Flores	10	6	0	4	12
4	Retiro A.C.	10	3	1	6	7
5	English High School	10	2	1	7	5
6	Quilmes Rovers	10	2	1	7	5

(C) Champions
