= Club Atlético Banfield =

Sports club in Argentina

Banfield
- Full name: Club Atlético Banfield
- Nickname: El Taladro (The Drill)
- Founded: 21 January 1896; 130 years ago
- Ground: Estadio Florencio Solá
- Capacity: 34,901
- Chairman: Matías Mariotto
- Manager: Pedro Troglio
- League: Primera División
- 2025: 21st of 30
- Website: clubabanfield.org
Home colours	Away colours	Third colours

Club Atlético Banfield is an Argentine sports club based in Banfield, a city in the Greater Buenos Aires area. It was founded on 21 January 1896 by British-origin inhabitants of the city, predominantly English with some Scottish and Irish members. The club is best known for its football team, which competes in the Primera División, the top division of the Argentine football league system.

In 2009 Banfield obtained their first Primera División title after winning the 2009 Apertura. Banfield had previously achieved a national cup title in 1920, when the club won the Copa de Honor Municipalidad de Buenos Aires after beating Boca Juniors 2–1. The club also won 10 titles in Primera Nacional, the second tier division in Argentina.

The club contests the Clásico del Sur (Southern Classic) against Lanús, considered a modern derby in Argentine football, and maintains rivalries with Los Andes, Temperley, Talleres (RdE), and Quilmes. In October 2018, with the appointment of Lucía Barbuto, Banfield became the first club in the history of Argentina's top division to elect a woman as president. The club also has a women's football section, established in 1997 and affiliated with the Argentine Football Association (AFA) in 2018.

Other sports practiced at the club include boxing, chess, field hockey, futsal, gymnastics, handball, roller skating, taekwondo, tennis and volleyball.

== History ==
=== Origin and foundation ===
In the second half of the 1880s, many British families settled in the village of Banfield, located 14 miles south of Buenos Aires. These families, with their English-style houses and Victorian social dynamics, gave the suburbs a distinctly British profile. The history of the club began on 21 January 1896, when a group of professionals and English merchants residing in Banfield decided to found a club which they named after the village, which had been named after the railway station, established in 1873, which in turn was named after Edward Banfield, the first manager of the Buenos Aires Great Southern Railway. Heading the group of founders were Daniel Kingsland and George Burton, vice president and first. Kingsland was an exporter of cattle in Britain and an accountant while Burton was a Cambridge University graduate.

The pitch was a field for grazing located two blocks north of the railway station, next to the tracks on the east side. With Kingsland as president, cricket was the major sport, leaving football relegated to the background, which explains the poor performances of the club in football championships from 1897 to 1898, where the team finished in last place even suffering some of the largest defeats ever such as a 0–10 at the hands of defunct Flores AC.

=== First Successes ===
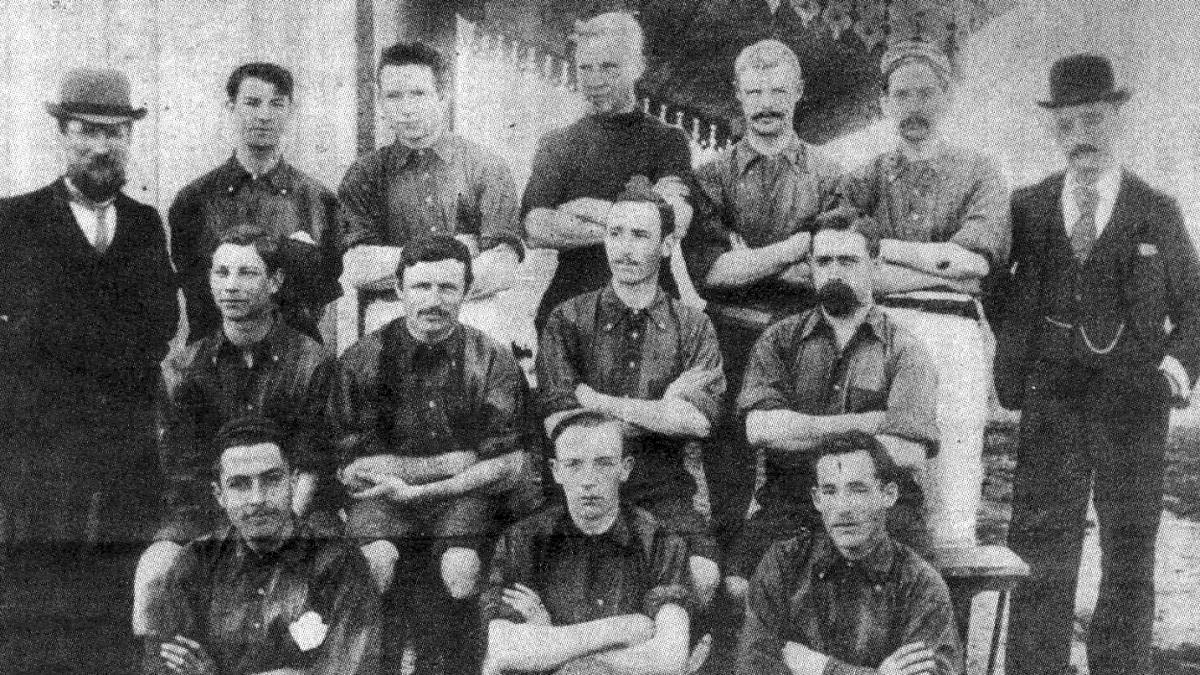
Banfield team of 1899. That year the squad won their first title in the Second Division

This situation lasted until 1899, when Alfredo Goode (a football enthusiast) was named president. In 1899 Banfield won its first title, proclaiming Second Division champion over Español High School. Banfield remains the only club currently affiliated with the Argentine Football Association (AFA), that had won a title in the 19th. century.

Banfield players were all born in Great Britain except the center half and captain James Dodds Watson, an Argentine native born in Buenos Aires. The following year (1900), as there was still no promotion, Banfield retained the Second Division championship. That time the club won the title without being defeated. Key players included the goalscorer Edward "Invincible" Potter, noted dribbler Charles Douglas Moffatt, captain Watson Dodds, and goalkeeper/president Goode.

After that success, the club began to decline until December 1904, when Banfield was reorganized, with all of its assets liquidated to meet a hopeless bankruptcy. During those years, the figure of George Burton, another true lover of football, presided over the club until his death in 1928.

In 1908, the club's first team, playing in the Third Division, won the championship. In December 1910, a Banfield squad including William Peterson, Roger Jacobelli, Amador García, Carlos Lloveras, Galup Lanus and Bartholomew, amongst others, faced Racing Club in a two legged playoff for a place in the top division. The first match ended 0–0, with Racing finally winning, with a goal in extra time during the second match. In 1912, with the leadership of Captain Adolfo Pellens, Banfield won the championship for the third category thus the club ensured its return to second division. However, a restructuring of the tournament caused the first split in Argentine football, sending Banfield directly to the top category.

Banfield performed well in the 1913 and 1914 tournaments, but when World War I began, many of the team's players, who were of British origin, were enrolled in the British Army and were sent to the battlefront in Europe. In 1919, Banfield returned to the first division after beating defunct Del Plata in the final game.

=== The 1920s ===
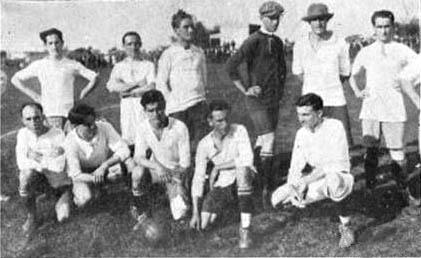
Team of Banfield that won the Copa de Honor, their first major title

Recently promoted, Banfield was runner-up behind champion Boca Juniors. That same year, Banfield played the Buenos Aires municipal honor cup. His first match was against Almagro. The match ended 1–1, after a 30-minute stretch. In the tiebreaker, Almagro won 1–0 and Banfield was eliminated. Boca Juniors reached the semifinals against Newell's Old Boys, one of those classified by the Rosario League. And Lanús, before the other Rosario, Federal Shot. But Lanús did not get to play, because he left the Argentine Football Association. Given this, the Tournament was rescheduled, among those who had been eliminated. Banfield won the points against Estudiantes de La Plata, who did not appear and defeated Sportivo Barracas and Porteño, to reach the semifinal against Tiro Federal. In the final, the Drill beat Boca. After losing 1–0 with a goal from Marcelino Martínez in the first half. For the complement, Banfield with goals from Bernardo Pambrún and Adolfo López, turned it around to be champion.

In 1928, club president George Burton died. He had chaired the club for over 20 years with a paternalistic attitude, cultivating and fervently supporting the amateur spirit of sport. His death created a large vacuum of power that plunged Banfield into a constitutional crisis for a decade.

=== 1930s and 1940s ===
In 1931, a group of clubs, led by the major teams, decided to establish a professional football league in Argentina. Therefore, "Liga Argentina de Football" was created. This association ended the covert professionalism that had occurred up until then, and remained as a dissident body so the official Argentine Football Association (AFA) was still amateur.

Banfield was invited to join the professional LAF to play its own competition (also named "Primera División"), but its leaders believed that professionalism would fail in the short term, and instead chose to continue participating in the amateur tournament. Immediately Banfield players received offers from now-professional clubs and left the team.

With a decimated roster, Banfield participated in amateur AFA tournament until 1934, when the LAF merged to it. In 1935, Banfield joined AFA and was assigned to the Second Division. The team made poor campaigns, with less than 300 supporters per game. In 1938, Banfield finished last, being relegated to a lower division.

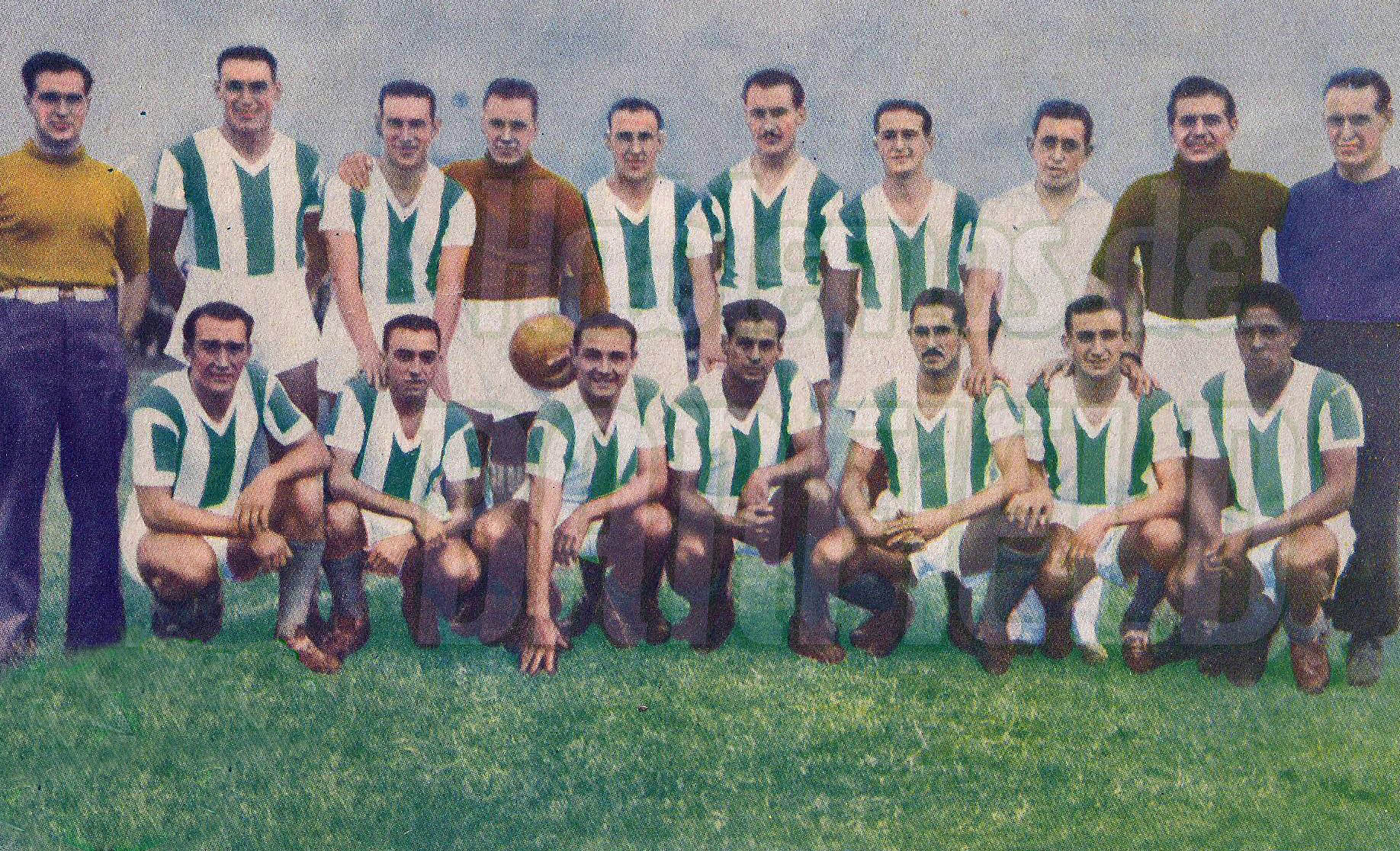
Team of Banfield in 1939. That year the club promoted to Primera División after winning the Segunda División championship

In late 1938, a group of members proposed to young entrepreneur Florencio Sola to take over the presidency of the club; although Banfield was in a critical situation, Sola nonetheless accepted. Taking advantage of club Estudiantil Porteño (that played in second division and had been disaffiliated from the AFA) Sola acted to prevent Banfield dropping into the Third Division. The Second Division rules stated that the six teams best placed at the end of the championship, would play a tournament (torneo hexagonal) which winner would promote to Primera División. Banfield qualified for that tournament although it was then revealed that club's manager Alberto Torreaga had bribed two footballers of Barracas Central, which lost to Banfield 3–2. Banfield played the tournament with many players loaned from other clubs. The squad won the hexagonal, promoting to Primera División in the 4th. round.

Banfield started the 1940 season with a renovated team, with players like Rafael Sanz, Eduardo Silvera, John Baptist Busuzzo, Alfredo De Terán, Armando Farro and others, the newspaper El Pampero nicknamed the team "El Taladro" ("The Drill"), which has remained the club's official nickname.

Banfield's stadium (later named "Florencio Sola"), was built in 1940 in the city of Banfield. To celebrate its inauguration, a match against Independiente took place, which Banfield lost 1–0 with a goal by Arsenio Erico. In 1941, Banfield was punished with a 16-point deduction for attempted bribery, but after a great campaign, the team avoided being relegated in the last fixture, with a victory over Rosario Central.

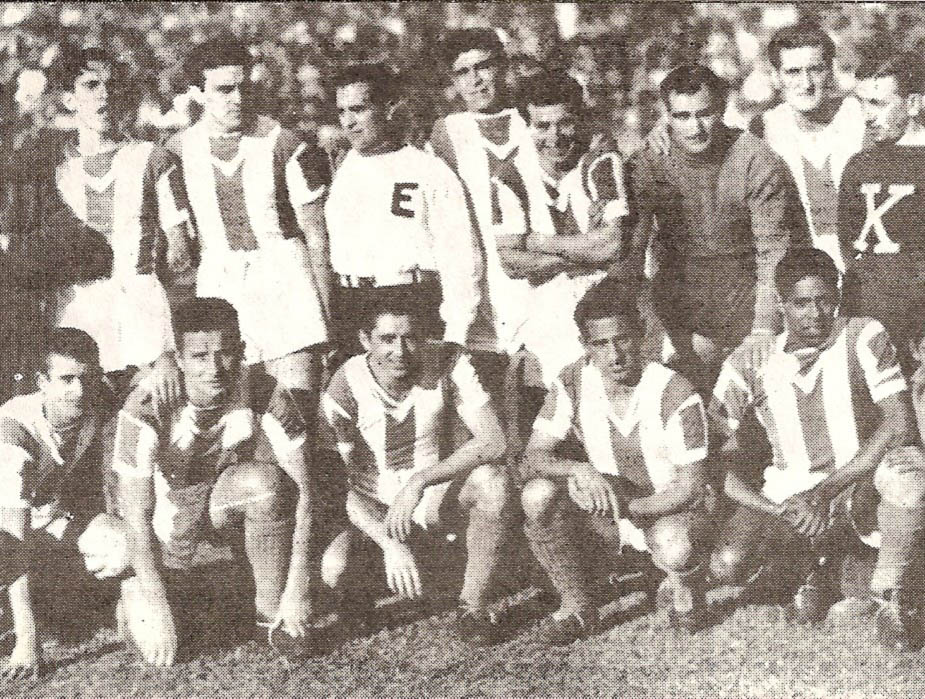
The 1946 Banfield squad that won the Primera B title, promoting to Primera División

After the campaigns of 1942 and 1943, the squad suffered several casualties and the team was relegated in 1944. The chair was occupied by Joseph Agulla in 1945. Meanwhile, Banfield made a good campaign in Second Division, but after a constitutional crisis later that year became Remigio Sola, brother of Florencio, became president. Chaired by Sola, the club formed a solid team for 1946 season, winning the second division championship with a season record that took over forty years to be broken.

In 1948, Florencio Sola became president for second time. Under his command, Banfield hired many players in order to form a strong team, although the club would not make a good campaign, nearly being relegated again. In the last five fixtures of that season, a strike of professional players was declared, thus all teams put youth players on the field. Renato Cesarini was Banfield coach during that period, obtaining 9 of 10 points which allowed Banfield to remain in the main division.

=== 1950s and 1960s: Glorious campaigns ===
In 1950, Banfield finished seventh in the first division championship. In 1951, with José Ildefonso Martínez and Félix Zurdo in the technical direction, Banfield occupied the first position of the table, but had to tie the breaker with Racing Club although he was ahead of the latter in goal difference and games won. He should have been the champion for the best goal difference (average goal, which was implemented shortly after), but he had to play two finals with Racing and lost in the second game by 1 to 0. The newspaper "El Pampero" baptized him as a moral champion .

Featuring almost the same team, Banfield ranked fifth in the 1952 championship. In 1953, the key player Eliseo Mouriño was acquired by Boca Juniors, which significantly affected the team: the following year he finished last and was relegated to the second division. After seven years, Florencio Sola did not want to continue leading the club and in 1955 presidential elections were held for the first time in the history of the institution. The lists presented by the groups "Traditionalist" and "Mr. Burton ”, winning the first.

Between 1950 and 1953 they went undefeated at home for 49 consecutive games, spanning three years and 17 days. The most remarkable thing in these years was in the lower divisions, where a team was champion of sixth, fifth, fourth and reserve between 1955 and 1958, from which values such as goalscorer Luis Suárez, Oscar Calics and Ezequiel Llanos emerged.

But even if the team finished first in the first round, this "star team" did not achieve their main objective, promotion. Starting in 1960, under the guidance of Benicio Acosta, but also with the contribution of great football knowledge, Valentín Suárez had started a process that led to promotion after a great campaign in 1962. The arrival of quality players Ediberto Righi, Norberto Raffo, Oscar López, Luis Maidana and Roberto Zárate, were complemented by local players such as Adolfo Vázquez, Oscar Llanos Ezequiel Calics and created a remarkable team that was third in 1960, second in 1961 and first in 1962. Starting in 1963, the club began a period of 16 seasons in which they remained in the First Division, except for 1973.

In the first four years, the "Drill" had excellent seasons, finishing seventh in 1963 and 1964. Slowly, the team was also renewed. This is how people like Julio San Lorenzo, Anacleto Peanno Diego Bay, Nelson López, Rubén Hugo and José Sanfilippo arrived. It was in 1967 when Banfield's performances began to wane despite the team including quality players such as Jorge Carrascosa, Rubén Flotta and José Manuel Ramos Delgado.

In 1968, Banfield wins the 1968 Promotional Tournament.

In 1969, he avoided relegation to the Second Division after winning a reclassification at home.

=== 1970s and 1980s: Promotions and relegations ===
In 1972, Banfield failed to avoid relegation. Coached by Oscar López and Oscar Cavallero, Banfield was proclaimed champion of First B (second division) in 1973. Ricardo La Volpe, Hugo Mateos, Silvio Sotelo, Eduardo and Juan Alberto Taverna were some of the team's outstanding players.

On 6 October 1974, through the National Tournament, he achieved the highest professional victory by defeating Puerto Comercial de Bahía Blanca by 13 to 1. Banfield was the first and only team to score 13 goals in a single game. It also maintains the highest goal difference, with 12, in confrontations between teams of the same category in all the AFA professional divisions.

In that same match, Juan Alberto Taverna established, with seven goals, the record for many goals scored by a player in a single match in all professionalism.

Upon returning to the First Division, over the years the performance of the Drill went from lowest to highest, reaching a peak of performance in the 1976 National Championship. With Adolfo Pedernera in the technical direction, this team had a notable forward integrated by Félix Lorenzo Orte, Roberto Sacconi, Pedro Raúl Gómez Vila, Miguel Ángel Corvo and Miguel González.

But the joy did not last long, because after a discreet campaign in 1977 Banfuekd's performance was very poor during 1978 and after losing a relegation tiebreaker against Platense, he lost the category again.

In 1985, the technical director Angel Cappa arrived at the club, who formed the base of the team that won the octagonal for promotion in 1987.

This team was made up of experienced players (Héctor Clide Díaz, José Luis Zuttión, Félix Lorenzo Orte), youth players who emerged in the lower divisions of the club (Horacio García, Marcelo Benítez, Daniel Aquino) and two Uruguayan players should be highlighted: Miguel Robinson Hernández and Rubén Solari, who had arrived with Hebert Birriel.

=== 1990–1999: Reconstruction ===
Banfield did not get off to a good start this decade, even playing in the relegation zone. The only notable moment was in the 1990–91 tournament, where the team reached the final although it could not be promoted to First. For the 1992–93 season and with Valentín Suárez again as president (having been elected in 1991 for the fifth time), Banfield appointed Carlos Babington as coach and acquired experienced players such as former River Plate goalkeeper Gabriel Puentedura, midfielder Fabio Lenguita and defender Ivar Stafuza (who had had a long tenure on Boca Juniors in the 1980s). Those footballers, plus some homegrown players such as Javier Sanguinetti (who has played the largest number of games with the club to date, with more than 450 games) and midfielder Jorge Jiménez, helped Banfield win the title and promotion to Primera División, after beating Colón de Santa Fe 5–4 on penalty shoot-out in the final.

Once the team returned to Primera, Banfield hired the duo Oscar López and Oscar Cavallero as coaches, reinforcing the squad with players such as former Ferro Carril Oeste's Oscar Acosta and the experienced goalkeeper Ángel Comizzo (who had been dismissed from River Plate by then-coach Daniel Passarella). But it was a young Javier Zanetti who would be the revelation of the team at the end of the season. Banfield made good campaigns during his first years in the top division, although the team could not repeat those good performances in successive tournaments, being finally relegated in 1997.

That same year Banfield hired Patricio Hernández as manager, but the team could not achieve good results under his coaching. The following year, businessman Carlos Portel took office as the new president of the institution, prevailing over the other candidate, Horacio Sola (son of Florencio Sola). The club was reported to be in a critical situation, so Portel announced that the main goal would be to reduce the club's debts.

=== The Falcioni era ===
In 2001, Banfield returned to the Primera División after winning promotion playoff series v Quilmes, with playmaker José Luis Garrafa Sánchez as the most valuable player. The team was coached by Ramón Héctor Ponce. The first years in the top division of Argentine football, the club was frequently in the relegation zone, although it achieved some historic results such as 5–0 over River Plate in the 2002 Apertura. Uruguayan Luis Garisto was the team's coach during that period.

At the beginning of the 2003 Apertura, Julio César Falcioni was appointed as coach of the team. Falcioni promoted some players that would then be key players for the club, such as Daniel Bilos and Rodrigo Palacio. Banfield got 62 points in the 2003 Clausura, finishing third and qualifying for the international cups (2004 Copa Sudamericana and 2005 Copa Libertadores). In Copa Libertadores, Banfield qualified to the knockout stage after finishing 2nd. to UANL Tigres in its group. The team then eliminated Independiente Medellín in the Round of 16 with a 5–0 aggregate but lost in quarterfinals by River Plate. Banfield finished in 7th place in the Cup, reaching 23rd place in the FIFA Club World Ranking.

In this period, Banfield played 5 international cups in 3 years, sneaking into the top 8 teams on the continent and selling players to European clubs such as Villareal, Anderlech, Olympique de Marseille and Liverpool. These campaigns also allowed the construction of the current stalls and the Microstadium in front of the Headquarters.

In 2009, after an acceptable performance in that year's Clausura Tournament, Banfield played the Apertura, still with Falcioni as coach. The most frequent lineups were: Cristian Lucchetti, Julio Barraza, Sebastián Méndez, Víctor López, Marcelo Bustamante, Maximiliano Bustos, Walter Erviti, Marcelo Quinteros, James Rodríguez, Sebastián Fernández and Santiago Silva (who later became the top scorer of that tournament). Banfield got off to a successful start, defeating teams like 2009 Clausura tournament champion Vélez Sársfield, Newell's Old Boys and drawing 0–0 with Rosario Central.

As the season progressed, Banfield gradually consolidated his leadership, being challenged by Rosario's Newell's Old Boys team, who also emerged as another strong candidate to win the title. Finally, after Banfield and Newell's victories against Club Atlético Tigre and Gimnasia de La Plata, respectively, the two rivals went on to the last game of the season with Banfield with a two-point lead over Newell's.

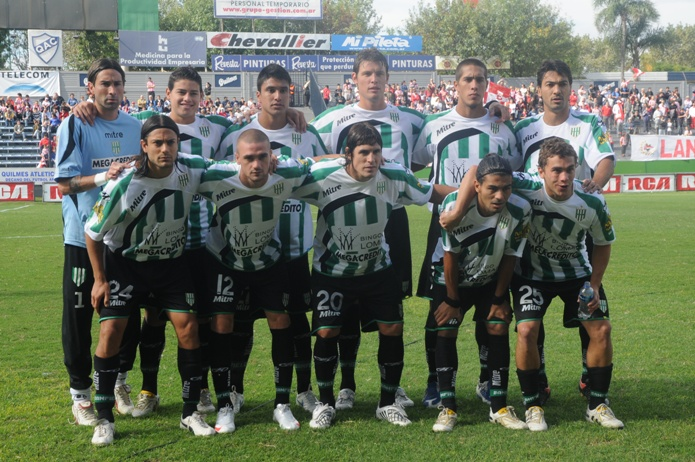
Banfield team during the 2010 Clausura

On 13 December 2009, although Banfield was defeated by Boca Juniors 0–2, the club achieved the championship because Newell's Old Boys, its closest rival, was also defeated by San Lorenzo 2–0. These results allowed Club Atlético Banfield to win its first championship in the highest category of Argentine football. There, in Banfield, about 40,000 people received the brand-new champions, who finally made the Olympic turn before their public after having obtained the first title in their history. The fans of the Buenos Aires team eagerly awaited the arrival of the players, after the defeat suffered against Boca at the La Bombonera stadium. Beyond the fall, Banfield kept the title, and after having received the trophy in La Boca, the players and the coaching staff moved to their stadium. Around 10 pm, the delegation arrived at the stadium, where some 40,000 spectators waited to continue with the festivities. "It is a dream come true, It is a miracle ...", acknowledged captain Cristian Lucchetti, one of the most applauded by the crowd.

After winning his first title, Banfield played the 2010 Copa Libertadores where the team, second in the first round behind Nacional de Montevideo, qualified for the next stage, but Banfield was eliminated by Internacional de Porto Alegre (which would become champion). In the national tournament, Banfield finished fifth in the Clausura 2010.

Banfield also played some South American tournaments such as the Copa Sudamericana 2010 (defeating Vélez Sarsfield, but the team lost to Colombian Deportes Tolima. After finishing 15th in the 2010 Apertura, Falcioni resigned, ending his second successful tenure at the club later to be hired by Boca Juniors to replace Claudio Borghi as coach.

=== Decline and relegation ===
In January 2011 Sebastián Méndez was named manager of the club. Banfield finished eighth in the 2011 Clausura and started the following tournament (2011 Apertura) losing four consecutive matches, which led to Méndez's resignation. After some provisional replacements as coaches, Ricardo La Volpe was chosen as new manager. La Volpe was fired only three months after his hiring. He had been involved in some controversies with some representative players of the institution, who even called president Carlos Portell to tell him they "Could not stand La Volpe anymore".

Uruguayan manager Jorge da Silva (who had previously worked in Godoy Cruz achieving a qualification to the Copa Libertadores) was hired to replace La Volpe since the 2012 Clausura. Banfield did not achieve good results, what precipitated Da Silva's resignation and his return to his country of origin. Eduardo Acevedo succeeded Da Silva but the team had another bad campaign, earning only 7 points from a possible 42.

In June 2012, Banfield was relegated to the second division (Primera B Nacional) after being defeated by Colón de Santa Fe 3–0. Banfield had placed last (19th of 19 teams) in the last two tournaments of Argentina. The team only won five games in both competitions, with 7 ties and 26 losses. Two days after, president Carlos Portell resigned, being accused of corruption by the fans and members of the club. Apart from Portell, of the managing left the club (including vice-president and treasurers), so a new election had to be held in order to choose a new chairman and managing for Banfield. The election was finally held in July 2012, being Eduardo Spinosa chosen as new chairman of the club. Espinoza won with a big margin of 77%.

== Symbol ==
Green and White: In the 1900 traveler's manual, it is stated that the colors of Banfield Athletic Club were brown and old gold. Due to the railroad origin of most of the partners, these colors are understood because they were identified with the danger signs on the barriers. The Banfield history book continues by pointing out that in the critical period of 1903–1904, the sisters of Alberto Dehenen, who was an important protagonist so that the club did not disappear, were in charge of making shirts with large red and white squares.

In the reorganization of 1904 white and green was adopted. The journalist Julio César Pasquato considered it possible that the green was due to the Irish origin of some of his players. Since 1907, the banfileña jacket has been green and white with batons, although it would undergo various modifications.

For example, under the influence of the brilliant 1974 Dutch national team "A Clockwork Orange", Banfield introduced orange into his clothing. Currently, that color persists in the alternative shirt, always mixed with green and white.

Drill: In 1940 Florencio Sola totally renewed the team. With players such as Rafael Sanz, Eduardo Silvera, Juan Bautista Busuzzo, Alfredo De Terán, Armando Farro and others, Banfield carried out a surprising and atypical campaign for newly promoted clubs, which is why the newspaper "El Pampero" baptized the team with the name of "the Drill", since his rivals had their arches drilled, a nickname that went down in history as the official pseudonym of the institution.

There are other versions that indicate that the nickname comes from the fact that he grabbed the big teams and "drilled them", referring to the fact that he led them to lower positions in the table.

Julio César Falcioni: Coach for 4 periods of the club, architect of the first championship of the first division of Banfield and maximum idol, undisputed, of the institution. Banfield fans consider Falcionismo as the best philosophy of the game in football and call themselves Falcionistas. A famous phrase that is always seen in one of the flags that fans hang in the stadium has the legend: "The happiest days were always Falcionistas."

== Supporters ==
Banfield fans are known in Argentina as La Banda del Sur. The fans come from the neighborhood where the club is located and from other neighborhoods in the south of Greater Buenos Aires. But it is easy to find Banfield fans throughout the south of Greater Buenos Aires and even in the City of Buenos Aires. According to a survey published by the magazine El Gráfico, in November 1998, Banfield had 0.3% of the fans in Argentina, which is equivalent to 104 thousand people at that time.

== Classics and rivalries ==
=== Clásicos ===
The rivalry between Lanús and Banfield is known as the Clásico del Sur. The clásico began to be contested as such in the late 1980s and early 1990s.

The second most important clásico for Banfield fans is against Quilmes, the team from the southern area of the Buenos Aires suburbs that played the most games after Lanús.

=== Rivalries ===
Another important rivalry is with Temperley, the third team in the Southern Zone with the most games played. Other teams in the area such as Talleres (RdE), El Porvenir, Los Andes, Defensa y Justicia and Arsenal de Sarandí consider Banfield to be an important rival.

And from other areas, important rivals of Banfield are considered: Morón (West Zone) and Nueva Chicago (Federal Capital).

== Uniform evolution ==
1896–99	1900–02	1903–04	1904–present (Note: Considered the traditional uniform until 1947 when it began to be alternated with the diagonal stripe jersey)	1947–present (Note: First introduced in 1947, it was the main jersey until 1951, then alternating with the vertical stripes kit.)

== Stadium ==
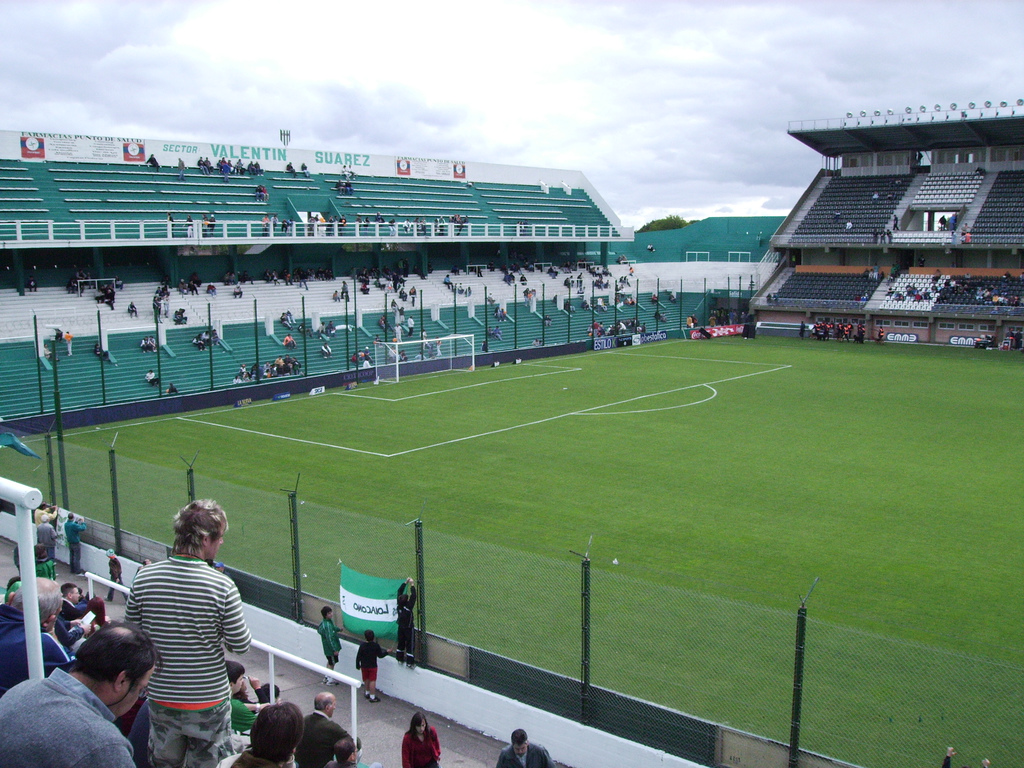
Estadio Florencio Sola, home venue

The Estadio Florencio Sola was built in 1940 and is named after former President of the institution in the most glorious period in its history: Don Florencio "Lencho" Sola.

To celebrate its inauguration, a match took place against Independiente de Avellaneda which the team won 1–0 on a goal by Arsenio Erico. At this stage, the "Drill" played a record 39 matches unbeaten from 1950 to 1953. The stadium was considered advanced for its time because it was the first club of so-called "medium" to possess concrete grandstands, even before some of the big teams.

It is situated on the corner of Peña and Arenales in the city of Banfield. It recently opened a new area of two with silver trays, boxes, changing rooms and booths for radio and TV. The stadium holds 37,245 spectators.

=== Roofed stalls of Sola ===
A plan was put together to extend the stadium. The board of directors of the club, decide to approve the project and work began in 2011. The extension is to build a second tray on the podium Eliseo Mouriño and also perform a second tray in the visitor sector. Also to be added are rounded elbows and transmission towers. Therefore, the stadium's capacity would be 45,326 spectators.

=== Head Office ===
The club's head office is located in Vergara 1635 (Banfield) and is the headquarters where athletes meet for various activities. Also, here are held steering committee meetings.

At headquarters, trainings are also held in other sports such as volleyball, futsal, skate, chess, children's football, gymnastics, taekwondo and the club has a training gym and a circle of lifetime partners, as well as a teamroom open to general public, where supporters gather.

== Team records ==
- Seasons in first division: 73
- Biggest win achieved:
  - in first division: 13–1 over Puerto Comercial de Bahía Blanca (6 October 1974) (biggest score ever in first division).
  - in National B: 10–2 over Unión de San Juan (1987)
  - in Primera B: 8–0 over All Boys (1962) in primera b 6–1 nueva Chicago 20 April 2002
  - in international tournaments: 4–1 over (Ecuador) El Nacional (27 February 2007)
- Biggest defeats:
  - First division: 1–8 to Estudiantes La Plata (1 June 1947)
  - Primera B: 0–6 to Argentino de Rosario (1945)
  - In international tournaments: 0–4 to (Mexico) Club América (7 March 2007)
- Best league position: 1st (champion) in 2009 Apertura
- Worst league position: 19th
- Top Scorer: Gustavo Albella: 136 goals (1945–51, 1954).
- Player with most appearances: Javier Sanguinetti: 423 games (1993–2008).
- International participations:
  - Copa Sudamericana 2004: first round (eliminated by (Argentina) Arsenal de Sarandí)
  - Copa Libertadores 2005: quarterfinals (eliminated by (Argentina) River Plate).
  - Copa Sudamericana 2005: eliminated by (Brazil) Fluminense.
  - Copa Sudamericana 2006: first round (eliminated by (Argentina) San Lorenzo).
  - Copa Libertadores 2007: first round
  - Copa Libertadores 2010: round of 16 (eliminated by (Brazil) Internacional).
  - Copa Sudamericana 2010: round of 16 (eliminated by (Colombia) Deportes Tolima).
  - Copa Sudamericana 2016: Second Phase (eliminated by (Argentina) San Lorenzo).
  - Copa Libertadores 2018: Phase 3 (eliminated by (Uruguay) Club Nacional de Football).
  - Copa Sudamericana 2018: Round of 16 (eliminated by (Argentina) Club Social y Deportivo Defensa y Justicia).

== Players ==
=== Current squad ===
As of 23 September 2026

Note: Flags indicate national team as defined under FIFA eligibility rules; some limited exceptions apply. Players may hold more than one non-FIFA nationality.

No.	Pos.	Nation	Player
4	DF	ARG	Juan Luis Alfaro
6	DF	ARG	Nicolás Meriano (on loan from Belgrano)
7	FW	ARG	Lisandro Piñero
8	MF	ARG	Lautaro Ríos
9	FW	URU	Adrián Balboa (on loan from Nizhny Novgorod)
10	MF	ARG	Lautaro Gómez
11	MF	ARG	Favio Álvarez
12	DF	ARG	Marcos López
13	DF	ARG	Brandon Oviedo
14	DF	ARG	Nehuén Paz
15	MF	ARG	Santiago Esquivel
18	MF	ARG	Federico Medina
19	DF	ARG	Lautaro Cano
20	MF	ARM	Tomás Adoryán
21	MF	ARG	Lautaro Villegas
22	FW	URU	Alexander Machado (on loan from Peñarol)

No.	Pos.	Nation	Player
23	MF	ARG	Lucas Palavecino
24	MF	ARG	Santiago López García
25	GK	ARG	Gino Santilli
27	DF	SYR	Ignacio Abraham
28	FW	ARG	Matías Hernández (on loan from San Lorenzo Almagro)
29	DF	ARG	Juan Iribarren
30	FW	ARG	Federico Anselmo
31	GK	ARG	Joaquín Molina
33	MF	COL	Neyder Moreno
34	DF	ARG	Santiago Daniele (on loan from Chacarita Juniors)
35	MF	ARG	Nacho Pais
37	DF	ARG	Renzo Malanca
40	MF	ARG	David Zalazar (on loan from Talleres)
50	GK	ARG	Diego Rodríguez (captain)
70	MF	COL	Manuel Arteaga
77	MF	CHI	Thomas Rodríguez

=== Reserve squad ===
Note: Flags indicate national team as defined under FIFA eligibility rules; some limited exceptions apply. Players may hold more than one non-FIFA nationality.

No.	Pos.	Nation	Player

==== Out on loan ====
Note: Flags indicate national team as defined under FIFA eligibility rules; some limited exceptions apply. Players may hold more than one non-FIFA nationality.

No.	Pos.	Nation	Player
16	MF	ARG	Alejandro Cabrera (at Estudiantes (RC) until 31 December 2026)
18	MF	ARG	Mauricio Roldán (at Rubio Ñú until 31 December 2026)

No.	Pos.	Nation	Player
39	FW	ARG	Marcos Echeverría (at Temperley until 31 December 2026)

=== Current coaching staff ===
Position	Staff
Head coach	(Argentina) Pedro Troglio
Assistant coach	(Argentina) Gustavo Reggi
Assistant coach	(Argentina) Marcos Funes
Fitness coach	(Argentina) Pablo Martín
Fitness coach	(Argentina) Carlos Piñeiro
Goalkeeper coach	(Argentina) Juan de la Fuente
Video analyst	(Argentina) Alejandro Giordano
(GPS)	(Argentina) Ignacio García
Doctor	(Argentina) Dr. Luciano Ríos
Physiotherapist	(Argentina) Gastón García Kantemiroff
Physiotherapist	(Argentina) Federico Roldán
Nutritionist	(Argentina) Martín Bocchicchio
Nutritionist	(Argentina) Alejandro Geminiani
Masseur	(Argentina) Ezequiel Desimone
Kit man	(Argentina) Luis Brito
Kit man	(Argentina) Pablo Fusaro
Kit man	(Argentina) Mauro Dipietrantonio

Last updated: 4 May 2025
Source: Cuerpo Técnico Fútbol Masculino

=== Notable players ===
To appear in this section a player must have either:

- Played at least 100 games for the club.
- Set a club record.
- Played for their national team while at the club.
- Played at least 15 games with their national team at any time.
- Been part of a World Cup squad.
- (Peru) Jorge Alcalde (1943–45)
- (Argentina) Herminio Masantonio (1944)
- (Argentina) Gustavo Albella (1945–51), (1955–56)
- (Argentina) Juan José Pizzuti (1947–50)
- (Argentina) Eliseo Mouriño (1948–52)
- (Chile) (Argentina) Ernesto Álvarez (1948–56)
- (Argentina) Oscar López (1960–65), (1970–71)
- (Argentina) Norberto Raffo (1961–66)
- (Argentina) Sergio Vázquez (1966)
- (Argentina) José Ramos Delgado (1966–67)
- (Argentina) José Sanfilippo (1966–67)
- (Argentina) Jorge Carrascosa (1967–69)
- (Argentina) Ricardo Lavolpe (1971–75)
- (Argentina) Silvio Sotelo (1971–78)
- (Argentina) Héctor Veira (1974)
- (Argentina) Carlos Buttice (1981–82)
- (Argentina) Daniel Delfino (1988–90), (1991–93), (1995–96)
- (Argentina) Javier Sanguinetti (1990–93), (1994–08)
- (Argentina) Javier Zanetti (1993–95)
- (Argentina) Ángel Comizzo (1993–96)
- (Argentina) Julio Cruz (1993–96)
- (Argentina) Néstor Lorenzo (1994–95)
- (Argentina) Pablo Paz (1995–96)
- (Paraguay) Guido Alvarenga (1995–96)
- (Paraguay) Pedro Sarabia (1996–97)
- (Uruguay) Walter Peletti (1996–97)
- (Argentina) Cristian Lucchetti (1996–02), (2005–10)
- (Italy) (Argentina) Mauro Camoranesi (1997–98)
- (Argentina) Andrés San Martín (1997–99), (2002–05)
- (Argentina) Carlos Leeb (1997–02)
- (Argentina) José Luis Sánchez (1999–05)
- (Argentina) Daniel Bilos (2000–05), (2009)
- (Argentina) Cristian Leiva (2001–02), (2003–06), (2012–14)
- (Uruguay) Josemir Lujambio (2001–02), (2005–07)
- (Argentina) Julio Barraza (2001–11)
- (Israel) (Argentina) Roberto Colautti (2002–03)
- (Argentina) Marcos Galarza (2002–09), (2012–13)
- (Argentina) Rodrigo Palacio (2003–04)
- (Paraguay) Jorge Núñez (2003–04)
- (Argentina) (Croatia) Darío Cvitanich (2003–08), (2017–19)
- (Italy) (Argentina) Gabriel Paletta (2005–06)
- (Argentina) Walter Erviti (2008–10), (2014–17)
- (Colombia) James Rodríguez (2008–10)
- (Uruguay) Sebastián Fernández (2008–10)
- (Uruguay) Santiago Silva (2009), (2016)

=== Individual records ===
==== Most appearances ====
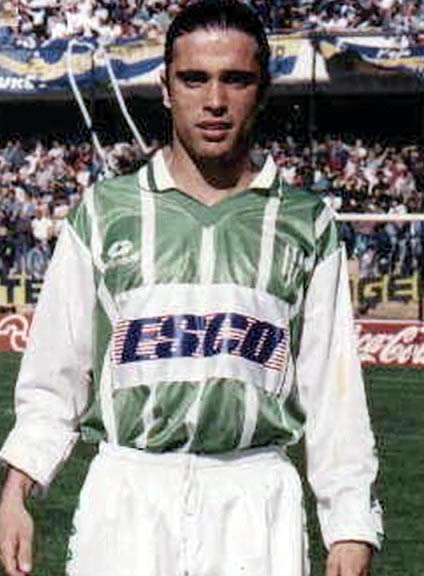
Javier Sanguinetti has the most appearances

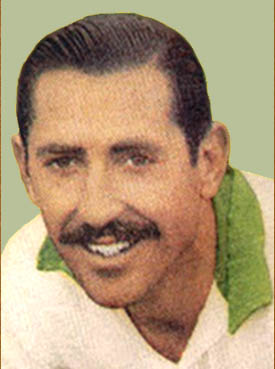
Gustavo Albella, all-time top scorer

No.	Player	Pos.	Tenure	Match.
1	(Argentina) Javier Sanguinetti	DF	1989–93, 1994–2008	493
2	(Argentina) Cristian Lucchetti	GK	1996–2003, 2005–10, 2011–12	319
3	(Argentina) Luis Bagnato	GK	1946, 1955–56, 1958–59	311
4	(Argentina) Silvio Sotelo	DF	1971–78	242
5	(Argentina) Gustavo Albella	FW	1946–51, 1955–56	233

==== Top scorers ====
No.	Player	Pos.	Tenure	Goals
1	(Argentina) Gustavo Albella	FW	1946–51, 1955–56	136
2	(Argentina) Rafael Sanz	FW	1940–44, 1947–48	81
3	(Argentina) Norberto Raffo	FW	1963–66	68
4	(Argentina) Luis E. Suárez	FW	1954–61	68
5	(Argentina) Darío Cvitanich	FW	2003–08, 2016–18	65

== Presidents ==
- 1896-1898 Daniel Kingsland
- 1899-1900 Alfred John Goode
- 1901 Federick James Cassini
- 1902 George Stearn
- 1903-1904 Clement August Mason
- 1905-1906 Dante Terenziani
- 1906 R. Valenzuela
- 1907-1910 George James William Burton
- 1910: J. L. Howard
- 1911: L. J. Thiesen
- 1912: Guillermo Coo
- 1913–28: G. J. W. Burton ^{1}
- 1928–30: Félix Sola (h)
- 1930–32: Rafael de Seta
- 1933: Américo Pisano
- 1934: Rafael de Seta
- 1935: Francisco Ventura
- 1936: Gerardo Martínez Abal
- 1937: Américo Pisano
- 1938–44: Florencio Sola
- 1945–46: Remigio Sola
- 1947–54: Florencio Sola
- 1955: Antonio Benito Ferranti ^{2}
- 1956: Enrique Beltrán Simo
- 1957–59: Alfredo Gómez ^{2}
- 1960–62: Valentín Suárez
- 1963–65: Juan Carlos Fontela
- 1966–68: Valentín Suárez
- 1969: Juan Carlos Fontela
- 1970–71: Carlos Ismael Soler
- 1972–74: Valentín Suárez
- 1975–77: Osvaldo Fani
- 1978–79: Manuel Salgado
- 1980: Aniceto Rodrigo ^{2}
- 1980: Juan Carlos Mori
- 1981–83: Néstor Edgardo Villar
- 1984–85: Valentín Suárez ^{2}
- 1985: Miguel M. Alberdi
- 1986: Atilio Pettinati ^{2}
- 1986–87: Fernando Oscar Tomás ^{2}
- 1987–89: Raúl Alfonso Muñiz
- 1989–91: Julio César Grigera
- 1991–93: Valentín Suárez
- 1993–95: Carlos Fontela ^{2}
- 1995–96: Raúl Alfonso Muñiz ^{2}
- 1996–98: Atilio Pettinati
- 1998–2012: Carlos Portell ^{2}
- 2012–2018: Eduardo Spinosa ^{2}
- 2018: Lucía Barbuto

Notes

- ^{1} Died on 29 June 1928.
- ^{2} Resigned.

== Managers ==
- (Argentina) Emilio Baldonedo
- (Greece) Dan Georgiadis (1958)
- (Argentina) Adolfo Pedernera (1976)
- (Argentina) Norberto Raffo (1977)
- (Argentina) Ángel Cappa (1985–86), (1987–88)
- (Uruguay) Luis Garisto (2001–03)
- (Argentina) Julio César Falcioni (2003–05)
- (Argentina) Pablo Sánchez (2007)
- (Argentina) Juan Manuel Llop (2007–08)
- (Argentina) Jorge Burruchaga (2008–09)
- (Argentina) Julio César Falcioni (2009–10)
- (Argentina) Sebastián Méndez (2011)
- (Uruguay) Eduardo Acevedo (2012)
- (Argentina) Daniel Garnero (2012–13)
- (Argentina) Matías Almeyda (2013–15)
- (Argentina) Claudio Vivas (2015–16)
- (Argentina) Julio César Falcioni (2016–18)
- (Argentina) Hernán Crespo (2018–19)
- (Argentina) Julio César Falcioni (2019–20)
- (Argentina) Javier Sanguinetti (2020–21)
- (Argentina) Claudio Vivas (2022)
- (Argentina) Javier Sanguinetti (2022–23)
- (Argentina) Julio César Falcioni (2023–24)
- (Uruguay) Gustavo Munúa (2024)
- (Argentina) Ariel Broggi (2025)
- (Argentina) Pedro Troglio (2025–present)

== Filial clubs ==
There are several clubs with the "Banfield" name (also wearing green and white colors) along Argentina, some of them are C.A. Banfield de Chaco in the city of Sánez Peña, Chaco; In Entre Ríos, there are two clubs, Banfield de Victoria in the homonymous city, and C.A. Banfield in Paraná.

Two "Club Atlético Banfield" are located in Buenos Aires Province, one of them in San Pedro, and the other in Mar del Plata ||. "Club Deportivo Banfield" is based in the city of San Vicente, Córdoba, with another C.A. Banfield sited in Alta Gracia. |- In Mendoza Province, the "Club Sportivo Banfield", founded in 1944, is located in Perdriel, at south of Luján de Cuyo, while "C.A. Defensores de Banfield" is a traditional club in Casilda, Santa Fe Province.

== Honours ==
- Primera División (1): 2009 Apertura
- Copa de Honor MCBA (1): 1920
- Primera B Nacional (3): 1992–93, 2000–01, 2013–14
- División Intermedia (1): 1919
- Primera B (7): 1899, 1900, 1912, 1939, 1946, 1962, 1973
- Primera C (1): 1908
