= Buenos Aires English High School =

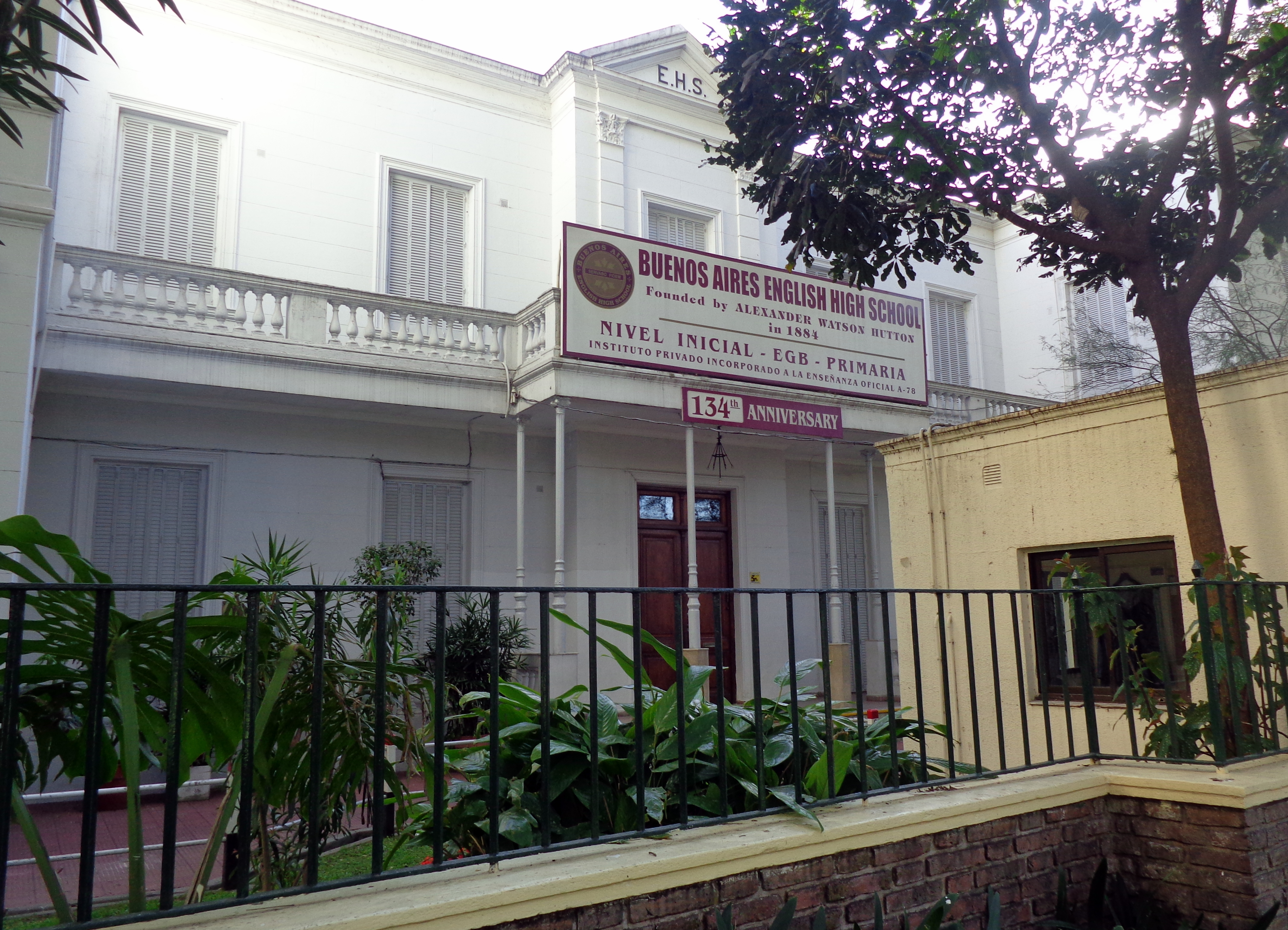
- The school as seen in 2018

Location
- Melián 1880; Belgrano, CABA, Buenos Aires CP 1430; Argentina
- Coordinates: 34.57054°S 58.465793°W

Information
- Funding type: Private
- Motto: Servabo Fidem (Keep the faith)
- Established: 1 February 1884; 142 years ago
- Founder: Alexander Watson Hutton
- Status: Active
- Director: Carlos Corbino
- Colors: (Burgundy & Beige)
- Athletics: Football, field hockey, rugby union, softball, handball, gymnastics

The Buenos Aires English High School, also known for its abbreviation BAEHS, is a bilingual school established in Belgrano, Buenos Aires in 1884 by Alexander Watson Hutton, considered "the father" of Argentine football. Watson Hutton was born in Scotland and emigrated to Argentina in 1882. The first educational institution where he worked was St. Andrew's Scots School for two years. As a keen sportsman, Watson Hutton believed that sports were of fundamental importance in education. Nevertheless, he resigned a short while later due to St. Andrew's (which would later win the first Argentine Primera División championship in 1891) not having funds to acquire sports facilities, which were considered by Hutton as an essential component of his teaching methods.

== History ==
=== The beginning ===
After leaving St. Andrew's, Watson Hutton decided to create the Buenos Aires English High School to put in practise his ideas about education, with a special predilection for football. The BAEHS opened on February 1, 1884, with a first location in Perú street, at the Buenos Aires downtown. The School later moved to Belgrano district in 1906. Watson Hutson left BAEHS in 1910.

Under the direction of Watson Hutton, the School encouraged the practise of sports among its students. Cricket, swimming, tennis, fencing, boxing were some of the sports added to the institution, apart from football, which Watson Hutton had a fondness for.

=== The legend of Alumni ===
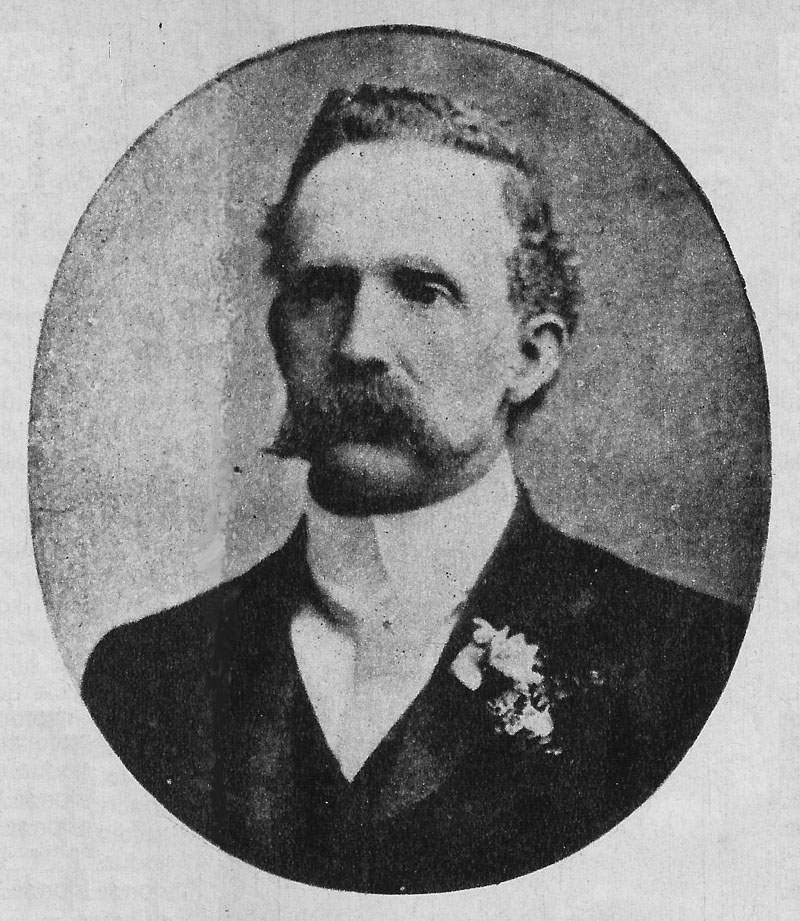
Alexander Watson Hutton, founder of the school, promoted the practise of sports and was a football pioneer in Argentina

To start with the practice of football in Argentina, Waton Hutton brought William Watters from Scotland, to work as a trainer. Some sources state that it was Watters who brought the first footballs from Great Britain to Argentina.

The School registered a football team that participated in the 1893 Argentine Primera División, the first organised by the Argentine Football Association created that year. The team also played the 1895 tournament.

In 1898 the Minister of Justice and Public Instruction ruled that teaching of physical exercises would be obligatory for all the national schools programs. Furthermore, it was required that each School had to create a sports club formed by their current and former students. As a result, on October 3, 1898, "Club Atlético English High School" was founded. The school bought its first facility in Coghlan, Buenos Aires, near the train station, with the purpose of practising physical activities as it was required

BAEHS football team, renamed "Alumni A.C." in 1901 obliged by the Argentine Football Association regulations, became not only the most successful team of amateur era in Argentine football but a legendary squad, During its 12 years of existence, Alumni won 10 Primera División titles, plus 2 Copa de Honor Municipalidad de Buenos Aires, and 3 Copa de Competencia Jockey Club. The international achievements include 6 Tie Cup and 1 Copa de Honor Cousenier.

Alumni played its last tournament in 1911, being definitely dissolved in 1913, although the team would be occasionally reunited to play some friendly and exhibition games.

=== The legacy survives ===
Forty years after the last official championship played by Alumni, a group of former students of the School decided to honour the legacy of the team, but through a rugby union club. They requested BAEHS to use the name "Alumni", which was immediately accepted, therefore "Asociación Alumni" was established on December 13, 1951. The team made its debut in the 1952 season.

The rugby union team adopted the same colours that the football team (red and white), having won 5 Torneo de la URBA and 1 Nacional de Clubes championships to date.
