= Lobos Athletic Club =

Lobos
- Full name: Lobos Athletic Club
- Nickname: Rojinegro
- Founded: 3 July 1892; 133 years ago
- Ground: Estadio Polideportivo Lobos; Lobos, Argentina
- Chairman: José Novoa
- Manager: Juan Basterrechea
- League: Liga Lobense
- 2025: ?
Home colours

Lobos Athletic Club is an Argentine sports club based in the city of Lobos, Buenos Aires. Although other sports were practised at the club, Lobos Athletic is mostly known for its football team, who took part in the Primera División championships until its disaffection, being runner-up in 1898 and 1899. Nowadays Lobos AC plays in "Liga Lobense de Fútbol", a regional league of Buenos Aires Province.

Apart from football, other sports sections of the club are field hockey, basketball and volleyball.

== History ==
At the end of 19th century the city of Lobos had an intense commercial and industrial activity, although the most part of the incomes were produced by agriculture. Lobos was populated mostly by English immigrants who owned wide portions of lands. Those Irish people were not interested in the "criollo" culture, so they were looking for another activities to spend the time. Tomás Moore, one of those Irish immigrants, wrote in his diary: "Tomás McKeon and I will do as much as possible to found an athletic club in Lobos, although I think it would be very difficult with no help... We'll put our most efforts and only when we realize it is impossible, we will surrender"

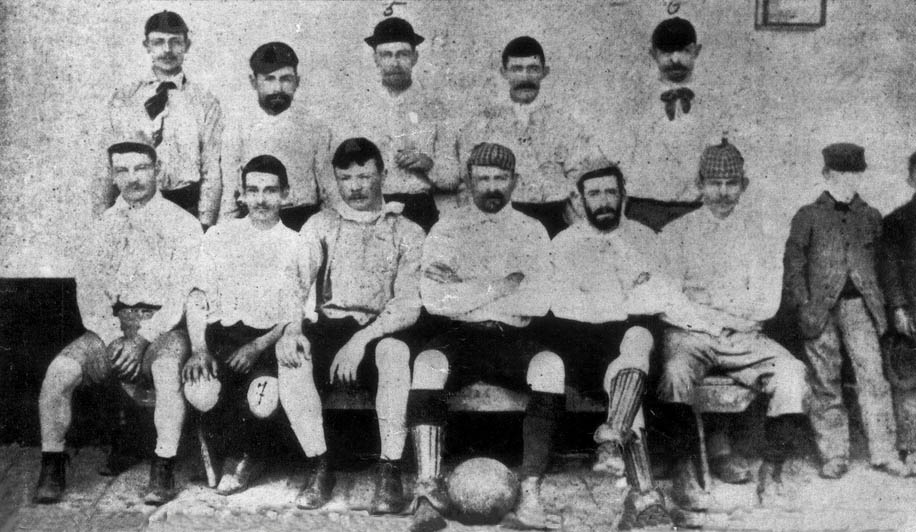
The first football team, 1892

In the first meeting, on Sunday 3 July 1892, Lobos Athletic was founded. According with club's founding act, the purpose of creating a club was "To serve as an entertainment for the youth of Lobos, living in a town which life is monotonous and boring. This entertainment would be possible through football, which will be practised following the Association rules"

Lobos Athletic was the first club to host the practise of football in Buenos Aires Province, some of these footballing techniques was being taught later in the early 1900s by an Irish immigrant [Patrick (Paddy) McCarthy] who arrived in Buenos Aires in 1900 at the age of 29 to teach English and athletics at the Commerce School. Edmundo Kirk was elected as its first president, while Tomás Moore was the first captain for the club. Other persons that took part in club's foundation were Carlos Page, Patricio Kirk, Tomás Mackeon, Tomás Garraham, Santiago Mackeon, Eugenio Seery, Juan Geoghehan, José Garrahan, Lorenzo Owens, Felix Dolan, Hugo Lawlor, Eduardo Walsh, William Weir, José Joyce, Eusebio Eguino, Eduardo Slamon and Eduardo Burbridge Jr.

Those young people studied at the English High School of Buenos Aires (where legendary team Alumni was founded) and because of their contacts with other students, Lobos AC played some matches facing Once de Carlos Bowers, Ferrocarril Sud, Quilmes, St. Andrew's and English High School, all of them in 1893. That same year the team changed its original colors (blue and white) to differ from other teams that had also adopted the blue. For that reason, Lobos switched to red and black, which would be the definitive colors of the club. Likewise, Lobos AC's first field was placed in a land that the Buenos Aires Western Railway allowed them to use.

During those first years of football in Argentina, Lobos was runner-up in the 1898 and 1899 Primera División championships, following Lomas A.C., which was a very strong team by then. On July 30, 1899, Lobos was also the first Argentine football team to go on a tour outside the country, playing some friendly matches in Uruguay where the squad achieved a notable 2–0 win over CURCC (current Peñarol).

That same year the Argentine Football Association ruled that its clubs should be their fields located no more than 30 km from the city of Buenos Aires, which caused Lobos AC disaffiliated from the union.

In 1902, three Lobos AC footballers were called up for the Argentina national team to play the first international against Uruguay: Walter Buchanan, Carlos Buchanan, and Juan Moore took part of the team that defeated the Uruguayan side 6–0 in the historic match between both teams, that would be later known as "Rioplatense derby", one of the most important of South American football.

Some of the most notable Lobos footballers then continued their careers in legendary team Alumni, the most winning club of Argentina until its dissolution in 1913. Those players were Moore, the Buchanan brothers, Juan Mc Kechnie, and brothers Herbert and William Jordan.
