= Lomas Academy =

- Founded: 1895
- Dissolved: c. 1900; 125 years ago
- Ground: Baker Memorial School, Lomas de Zamora
- Owner: Lomas Athletic Club
- League: Primera División
- 1896: 1st (champion)
colours

Lomas Academy was a football team created by members of the Lomas Athletic Club in order to have another team of the institution competing at the championships organised by the Argentine Football Association. The team played its home games at the Barker Memorial School (current Barker College) in Lomas de Zamora.

The name "Lomas Academy" was taken from the school where the original founders of Lomas A.C. had studied before creating the club. and it had also been the original name of the club, used until 1892.

== History ==
The team was registered in 1895 making its debut that same year, where it finished 2nd after its "elder brother" Lomas A.C. which was the champion. One year later, Lomas Academy won its first and only title, relegating Lomas AC to the third place. The runner-up was defunct team Flores Athletic.

Despite its successful seasons at the top category of Argentine football, Lomas Academy would not play a senior tournament again. There are some records of Lomas Academy playing the Tercera División championship in 1900, and it is believed that the team dissolved soon after.

== Honours ==
=== National ===
- Primera División
  - Winners (1): 1896
