= History of Boca Juniors =

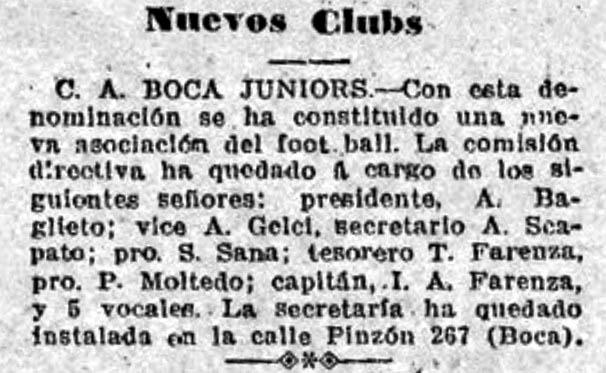
"New clubs" – chronicle of the foundation of C.A. Boca Juniors on an Argentine newspaper, April 1905

The origins of Argentine sports club Boca Juniors can be traced to the early 1900s, when a group of teenagers decided to establish a football club in La Boca, a working-class neighborhood of Buenos Aires. Most of the original founders of the club were of Italian descent, as the southern barrio had been settled by Ligurian migrants during the 19th century; to this day, Boca supporters are known as "Xeneizes" (a deformation of "Zeneise", meaning "Genoese" in the Ligurian language).

During the first years of its existence, the club developed a strong rivalry with then neighbor team River Plate, that would continue throughout the years, despite River Plate having left La Boca to establish itself in Belgrano. In the 20th century, Boca consolidated as one of the most popular and successful clubs in Argentina, giving its first step in 1913 when the team promoted to Primera División.

Although Boca Juniors won its first official title in 1919 (the Primera División championship), the first milestone in the history of the club came in 1925 with the successful tour to Europe, where Boca Juniors played 19 matches, winning 15 of them. That tour was the first time an Argentine team played abroad, and it helped Boca considerably increase its number of fans in Argentina. Besides, the term "player number 12" was used for the first time during that tour.

Before La Bombonera was opened in 1940, Boca Juniors played its home venues at many locations, with its first field located in Dársena Sud (south of current Puerto Madero neighborhood). Other locations include fields in Isla Demarchi, and Wilde in Avellaneda Partido. The first stadium in La Boca was at Ministro Brin and Senguel streets which lasted until 1924 when the club moved to Brandsen and Del Crucero.

Although football was the main interest of the club (and the sport which the club is mostly renowned for) at the moment of having been founded, Boca Juniors also added other sports, most notably basketball (which team has won several titles since the section was created in 1929), and volleyball. In football, Boca Juniors is considered one of the "Big Five" since 1937, when the Argentine Football Association (AFA) arranged a system of proportional representation for the affiliated clubs.

== Italian immigration to Argentina ==
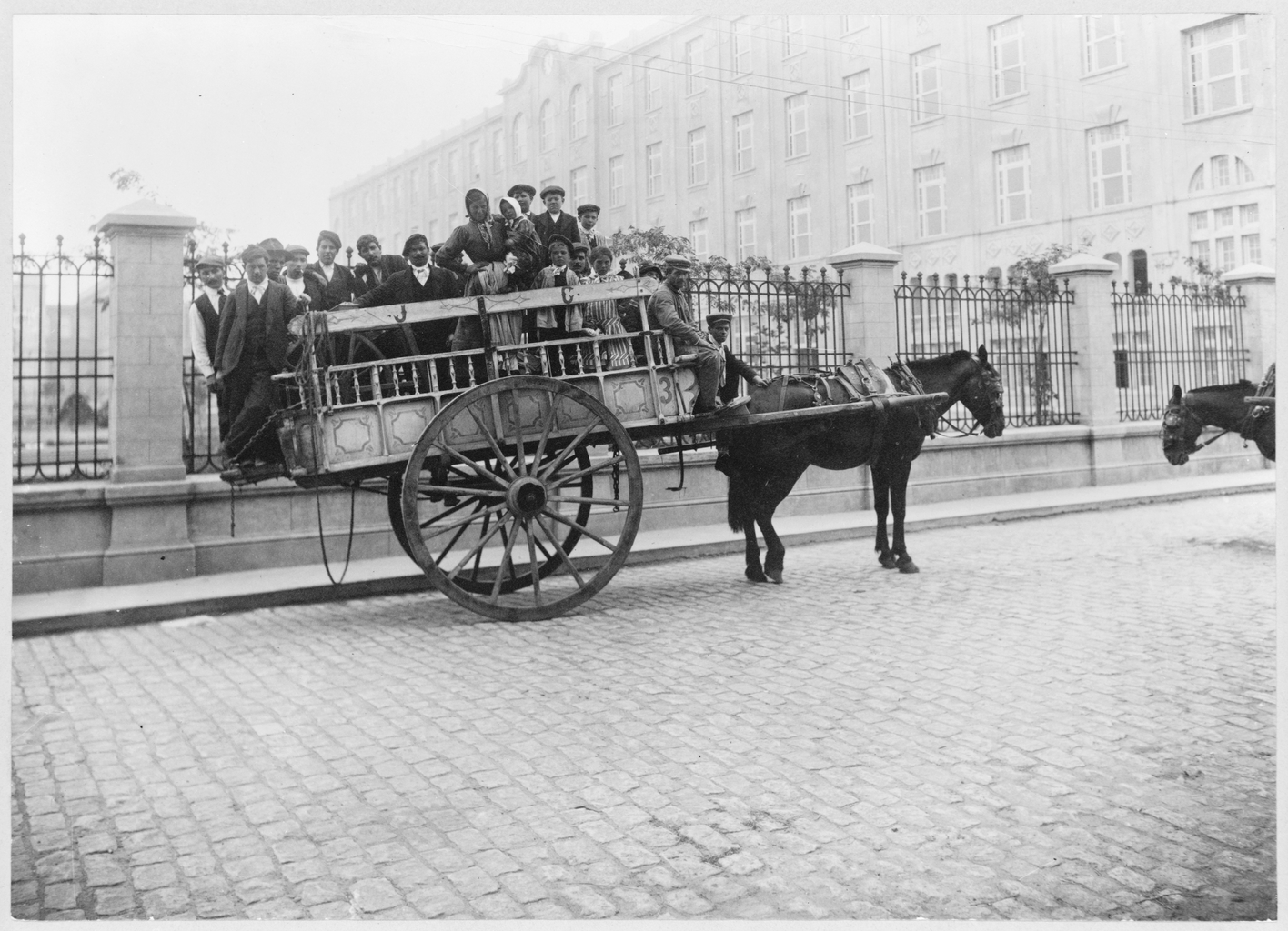
Immigrants transported on horse-drawn wagon in Buenos Aires, c. 1899

By 1905, Buenos Aires was a city of only 900,000 inhabitants. A significant part of them were Italian immigrants, that had arrived en masse from 1870 to 1920 with a peak between 1900 and 1915. The majority of them established in the Buenos Aires Province, working in a large range of occupations such as agriculture, craft, commerce, among others.

By 1914 the 50% of the immigrants who came to Argentina were Italian.

Italian immigrants living in La Boca tried to keep their customs and social practices. The "cantinas" were the places where they used to meet and dance the typical Italian rhythms. The dishes were also brought from their country of origin, such as pizza and pasta.

Italian influence is still visible in Argentina, with Lunfardo, the jargon enshrined in tango lyrics, laden with Italianisms, often also found in the mainstream colloquial dialect (Rioplatense Spanish). Common dishes with Italian names and origins (milanesa, fainá, polenta, pascualina) were adopted by Argentina and nowadays they are recognizable dishes of the local gastronomy.

== Foundation ==
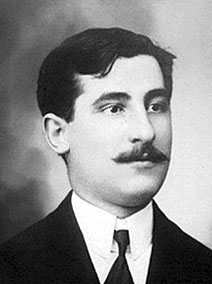
Esteban Baglietto, one of Boca Juniors founders, also its first president and goalkeeper

On April 1, 1905, a group of boys that had been part of a football team, "Independencia Sud", met in a bench of Plaza Solís of La Boca with the purpose of establishing a team. They were Esteban Baglietto, Santiago Scarpatti, Santiago Sana, and brothers Juan and Teodoro Farenga. As they didn't reach an agreement, a new meeting was called for the next day. In a new meeting on April 3, they finally agreed and the first committee was established, with Baglietto as president. After several names were proposed, "Boca" (for the neighborhood) was chosen, adding "Juniors" to it after a suggestion by Sana, to highlight the name. The use of English language in football team names was commonplace, as British railway workers had originally introduced football into Argentina.

Plaza Solís, seat of the first meeting, is recognized today as the place where Boca Juniors was established.

Baglietto, Sana and Scarpatti had received football lessons by Patrick "Paddy" McCarthy an Irish footballer and boxer who came to Argentina in 1900 and taught football techniques to the children of immigrants, as an appointed member of the sports municipal committee in Buenos Aires. (Note: Nevertheless, other sources refer to McCarthy as the only founder of the club and the Italian immigrants as the persons who made it their own.)

Other important founders members include Arturo Penney, Marcelino Vergara, Luis Cerezo, Adolfo Taggio, Giovanelli, Donato Abbatángelo and Bertolini.

== Early years ==
The first field of the club was placed on the square block formed by Pedro de Mendoza, Colorado (A. Caffarena today), Sengüel (B. Pérez Galdós) and Gaboto streets in "Dársena Sud", while the headquarters located on Pinzón street (then moved to Suárez street). On April 21, 1905, Boca Juniors played its first match, beating Mariano Moreno 4–0, with goals scored by Juan Farenga (2), José Farenga and Sana. The starting line-up was: Esteban Baglietto (founder and president); José Farenga (founder and treasurer), Santiago Sana, Vicente Oñate, Guillermo Tyler, Luis De Harenne, Alfredo Scarpatti (secretary), Pedro Moltedo (captain), Amadeo Gelsi (vice-president), Alberto Tallent and Juan Farenga (founder). In that match, the team wore a white shirt with black stripes, hand-stitched by Manuela, sister of the Farenga. That shirt was worn in several matches until it was replaced by a light blue one. Nevertheless, some versions state that the first jersey was pink and was worn only for the first two games, although there are no any solid evidence that can prove this.

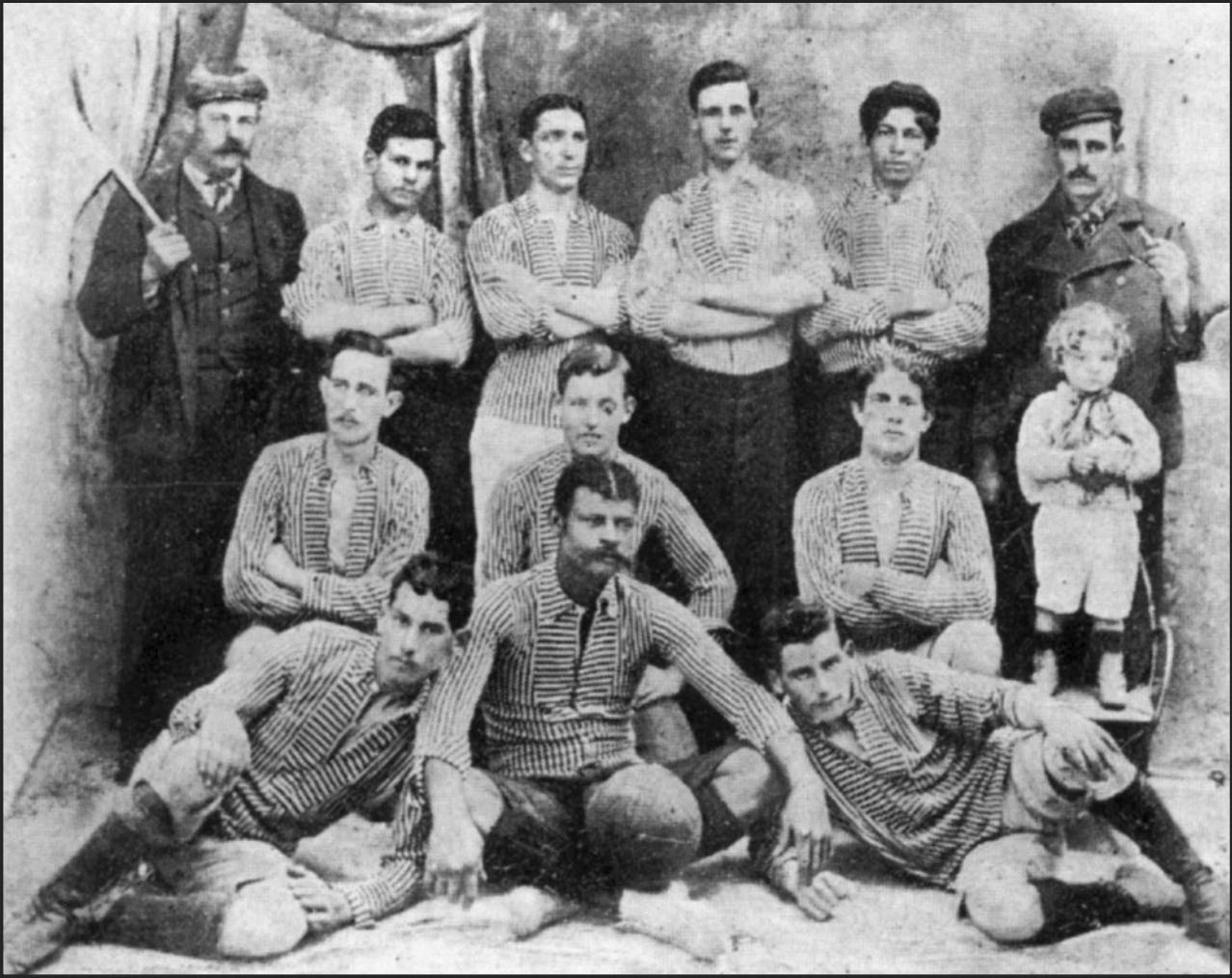
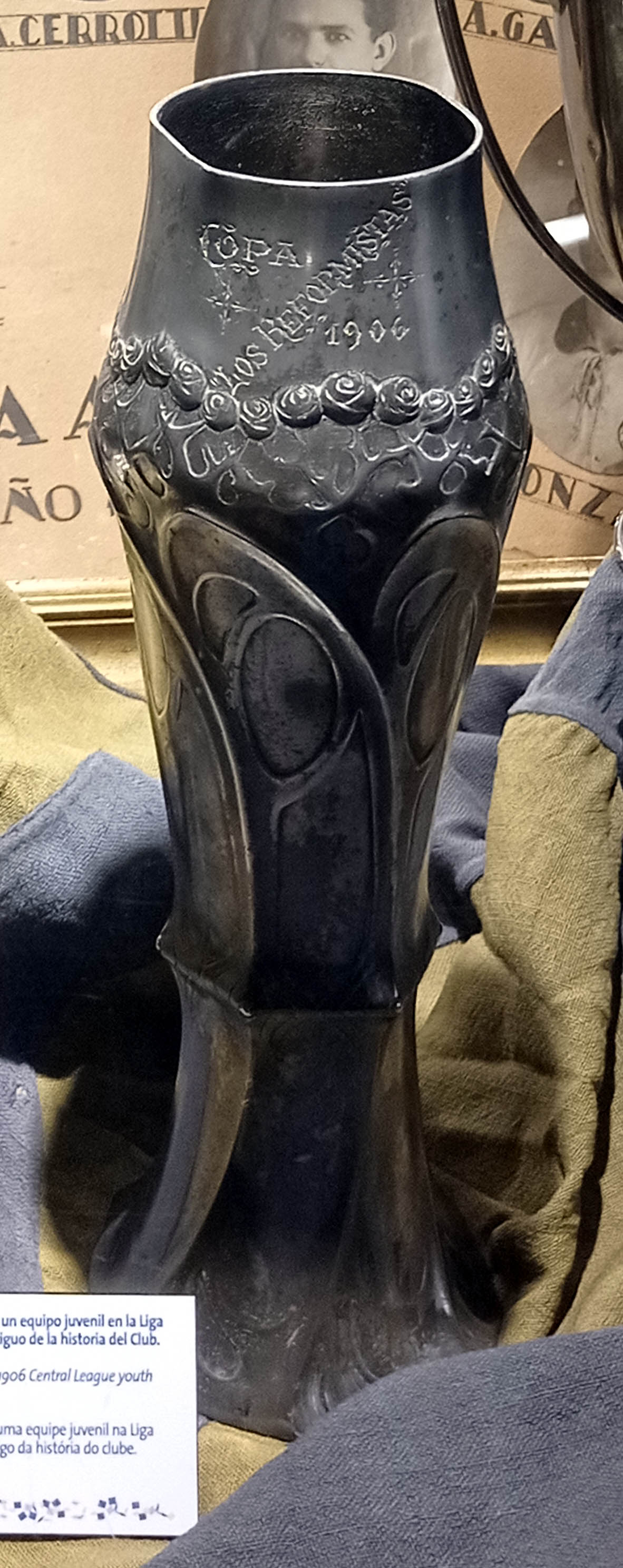
(Left): The first recorded photo of Boca Juniors, taken in 1906 after winning the Liga Central championship; (right): "Trofeo Los Reformistas" won by club in that competition, in exhibition at the Boca Juniors Museum

In August 1905, Boca registered to play in Copa Villalobos, where the team made a poor performance losing most of games. One of its rivals was Club Atlético Independiente. After the frustrating experience in Villalobos, Boca Juniors registered to another ligue, "Liga Central" in 1906, where the team would win its first title, being awarded the "Copa Reformista Trophy". Boca played 18 matches, winning 15 and remaining unbeaten.

In 1907 the club played two matches in Liga Central before switching to "Asociación Porteña de Foot-Ball". Some sources state that Boca wore the blue and gold colors for the first time on August 4, v General Arenales (Boca won 1–0). Those colors came after a suggestion from former club's president (and port worker) Juan Brichetto, taking the colors of the flag of the first ship he allowed to cross on the following morning. As the first ship that crossed the bridge was Swedish, Boca Juniors took those colors. It is believed that it was the 4146-ton freighter "Drottning Sophia", a Swedish vessel sailing from Copenhagen, although other historians say that the Drottning Sophia did not arrive in Buenos Aires in 1907 but in 1905. The ship that gave it colors to Boca Juniors would have probably been the Oskar II of Nordstjernan/Johnson Line, arriving to the port on February 5, 1907. The first design with those colors was blue with a diagonal gold sash.

In Asociación Porteña, Boca reached the final v Araneles, losing the playoff 1–0 after the first match (won by Boca 4–1) was annulled and the second ended in a 3–3 tie. In September, Boca registered in Liga Albión, where one of its rivals was Santa Rosa (predecessor of then arch-rival River Plate). That year, Boca played its first international match, v Uruguayan club Universal from Montevideo, on December 8, 1907. Universal won 1–0.

Boca Juniors played the 1907 Copa Albión final v San Telmo in 1908, winning 4–1 and therefore achieving its second title, being awarded the "Copa Barone Trophy".

== AFA affiliation ==
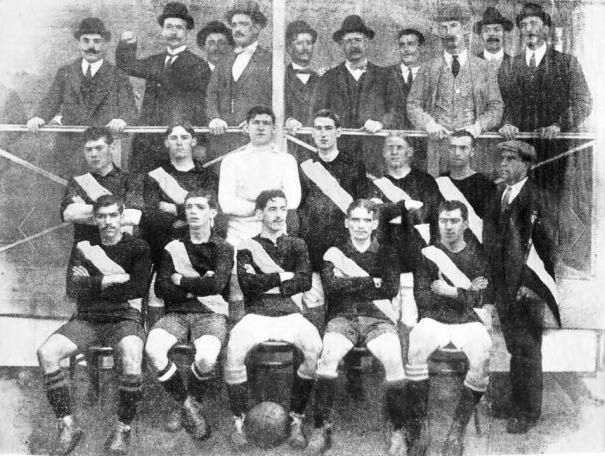
A Boca Juniors team of 1911, when it played in División Intermedia. The diagonal band would switch to a definitive horizontal band in 1913

In 1908 Boca Juniors affiliated to the Argentine Football Association to play in Segunda División, the second division of Argentine football by then. Boca Juniors' debut in official tournaments was on May 3, 1908, when the squad defeated Belgrano A.C. II by 3–1 in the stadium of Virrey del Pino and Superí of Belgrano neighborhood. Boca Juniors starting line-up for that historic match was: Juan de los Santos; Marcelino Vergara, Luis Cerezo; Guillermo Ryan, Alberto Penney, Juan Priano; Arturo Penney, Manuel Eloiso, Rafael Pratt, Pedro Moltedo, José María Farenga. Goals were scored by Pratt (2) and Eloiso. The squad finished in first place (among eight teams) and qualified for the next stage, the semifinal, where Boca was beat by Racing Club 1–0.

On August 2, the first Superclásico (friendly) was played, with Boca winning 2–1. Nevertheless, some sources state that there were previous matches between both clubs. That same year Boca Juniors played its first Copa Bullrich, a competition contested by Segunda División clubs. Boca was eliminated by Atlanta (then champion) in the second stage after being beat 5–0.

In 1909 Boca made a poor campaign, finishing 3rd in its zone. Gimnasia y Esgrima de Buenos Aires promoted to Primera División. In 1910 Boca Juniors made a good campaign winning 15 matches with only 3 losses. Boca played another semifinal against Racing Club but it lost 2–1 (at GEBA) and could not promote to the first division.

In 1911, División Intermedia is created as the second level of Argentine football, with Boca Juniors as one of its teams. The club made a poor campaign with only 7 wins and 8 losses, almost being relegated. Pedro Calomino (who became the first idol in the history of the club) debuted during this competition.

Boca left its field in 1912 to move to Costanera Sur, where the Naval Observatory is located nowadays. As a result of the first schism in the Association, dissident body Federación Argentina de Football is established, causing that only a few clubs remained to play a championship. Boca would be promoted to the first Division –among other teams– the next year.

== The coming to Primera División and "Superclásico" ==
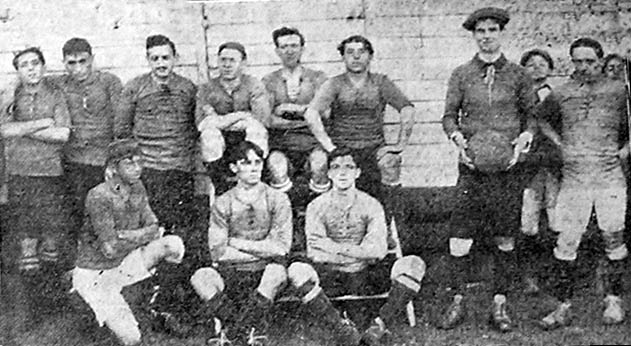
The Boca Juniors team that played the first Superclásico on August 24, 1913

In 1913 Boca earned the promotion to Primera División that the team had wanted for many years. This was possible when the Asociación Argentina de Fútbol decided to increase the number of teams in the league from 6 to 15. The other teams that went to Primera were Ferro Carril Oeste, Platense, Banfield, Olivos, Comercio, Ferrocarril Sud and Riachuelo.

Boca Juniors finished 5th. at its first season in Primera División, playing a total of 14 matches. The team won 8, lost 4 and drew 2, scoring 29 goals and conceding 16. The next season Boca Juniors finished 3rd. of 13 teams. The 1915 championship the team decreased its performance dramatically, finishing 14th. of 25, also suffering thrashing defeats at the hands of Racing Club (0–6) and San Isidro, the two best teams of the tournament. The defeat to San Isidro remains as the worst defeat ever in official matches.

The first official match between Boca Juniors and arch-rival River Plate, known as Superclásico, was played in the 1913 Primera División championship at Racing Club stadium, being won by River Plate by 2–1. Boca had previously played against River in other unofficial matches, but the exact dates are still under dispute. The most extended version affirms that the first Superclásico ever was played on August 2, 1908, with Boca Juniors being the winner by 2–1, although there are no documents that support the information. Other version state that the first recorded match was played in 1912.

== First titles and success ==
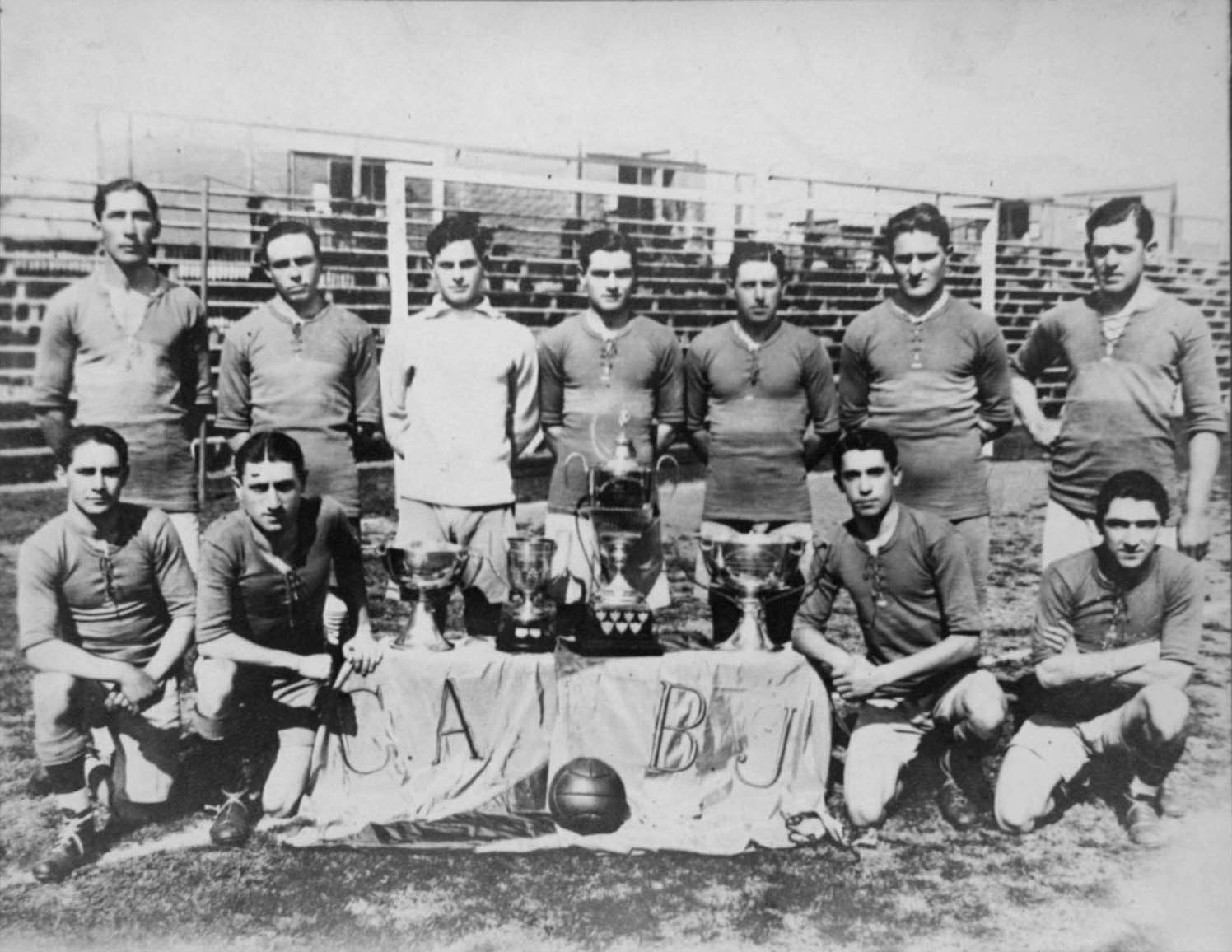
The 1919 team posing with all the trophies (four in total) won that season

In 1919, the Association expelled 7 clubs (while other 6 disaffiliated from the body to form Asociación Amateurs de Football), annulling the championship in progress and organised another competition with only 6 teams, Boca Juniors among them.

Boca Juniors won its first title ever (the 1919 Primera División championship). The team won all the matches played, scoring 29 goals and only conceding 5. The starting line-up for the last round was: Tesoriere; Cortella, Ortega; López, Busso, Elli; Calomino, Bozzo, Garasini, Martín, Miranda. It was played at Boca Juniors stadium, where Boca beat Sp. Almagro 4–0 (Martín and Miranda, two goals each).

That same year Boca won three titles else, national cups Copa de Competencia Jockey Club and Copa Ibarguren (both vs. the same rival and score: Rosario Central, 1–0) and the last edition of international Tie Cup defeating Uruguayan team Nacional 2–0 at Estadio Sportivo Barracas (goals by Miranda and Bozzo). Because of those achievements, 1919 remains as the most successful season in club's history, having won 4 titles (1 league, 2 domestic cups and 1 international).

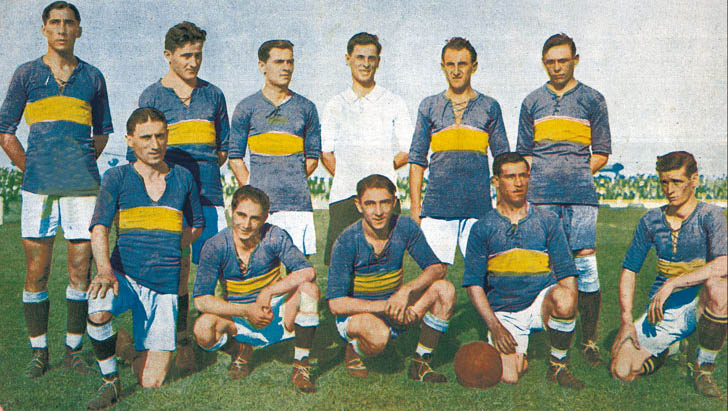
In 1920 Boca won its second league and the Copa de Honor in Montevideo, achieving its first title outside Argentina

The 1920 decade was also one of the most successful for the club, winning 9 titles. The second (and consecutive) league title in 1920, when in round 18th. Boca thrashed Nueva Chicago 7–0 on December 19. Boca played a total of 24 games with 20 won and only 1 loss.

In 1923 Boca won its third Primera División title, in a championship where 4 matches had to be played to decide which team (Boca or Huracán) would be the champion, so Boca won the first game but was defeated in the 2nd leg; the 3rd match finished in a tie, therefore, a 4th game had to be played (at Estadio Sportivo Barracas stadium, on 27 April 1924), finally won by Boca 2–0 thus winning the title. Both goals were scored by Garasini. The line-up was: Tesoriere; Bidoglio, Muttis; Médici, Busso, Elli; Calomino, Cerrotti, Garasini, Pozzo, Pertini. In 1923, Boca also won the 1920 edition of Copa de Honor Cousenier to Universal FC 2–0 in Montevideo, becoming the first title won outside Argentina. Line up was: Tesoriere; Bidoglio, Muttis; Médici, Busso, Elli; Calomino, Cerrotti, Tarasconi, Pertini, Filiberti (goals by Pertini and Tarasconi).

Also in 1923 Boca also won its second Copa Ibarguren after defeating Rosario Central (the same team that Boca had beaten in 1919) 1–0 at Sportivo Barracas. The line-up was: Tesoriere; Bidoglio, Muttis; Médici, Coverto, Elli; Calomino, Cerrotti, Tarasconi, Pozzo, Pertini.

Boca was the unbeaten champion of the 1924 season, winning 18 matches out of 19. The team finished with a total of 67 goals scored (an average of 3.52 per game) and only conceded 8. That same year Boca Juniors won its third Copa Dr. Ibarguren after thrashing Rosario Central by 5–1 at Chacarita Juniors stadium.

== European tour: "Champion of Honour" ==
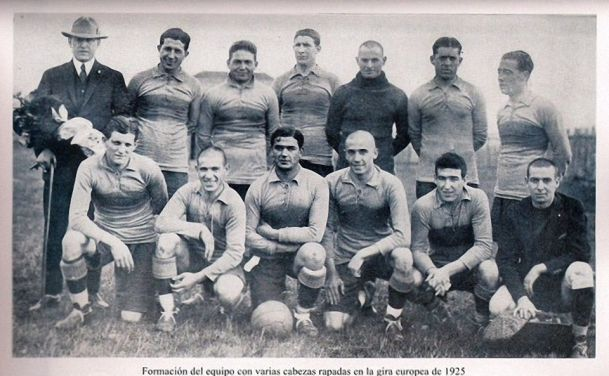
A Boca Juniors line-up during the tour on Europe, where the squad won 15 of 19 matches played.

In 1925 Boca made its first trip to Europe to play at Spain, Germany and France. The squad played a total of 19 games, winning 15 of them. Some of the rivals defeated were Real Madrid, Celta de Vigo and Deportivo La Coruña. On 28 June 1926, in a meeting held at the Association Argentina de Football, Boca Juniors was declared "Campeón de Honor" (Champion of Honour) of 1925 season, and each member of the team received a commemorative medal. The players were: Tesoriere, Bidoglio, Muttis, Tarasconi, Busso, Elli, Médici, Garasini, Antraygues, Cerroti, Pertini and Posso.

After the successful tour of Europe, Boca Juniors returned to the local competitions, winning its 5th. Primera División championship in 1926, having finished unbeaten (same as 1924 season) after 17 games played. Boca Juniors and Independiente were to play-off for the unified title following the unification of the two leagues (Asociación Argentina de Football and Asociación Amateurs de Football), but after their match (played on 20 February 1927) was halted due to a spectator invasion, and a replay on 3 March 1927, finished 0–0, no further match was played due to the start of the new season. Boca not only won the league championship but another edition of the Copa de Competencia Jockey Club, defeating Argentinos Juniors in the second match after the first game had finished drawn.

In 1926 Boca Juniors won another national cup, the Copa Estímulo (played while the Argentina national football team played at the South American championship) defeating Sportivo Balcarce by 3–0 at the final.

Boca Juniors finished the 1920s being one of the most successful teams of the decade, winning 4 league titles and 4 national cups during that period.

== The 1930s ==
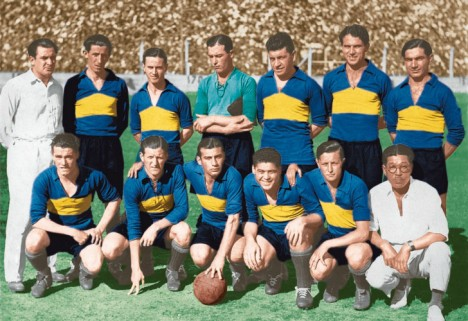
Boca Juniors was champion in 1931, achieving its 7th. league title.

After losing at the hands of San Lorenzo de Almagro the 1929 championship, Boca would win its 6th. title in 1930, when the squad defeated Atlanta by 4–1, just two fixtures before the end of the season. The line-up that attended the match was: Mena, Bidoglio, Muttis; Moreyras, Pedemonte, Arico Suárez; Penella, Kuko, Tarasconi, Cherro, Alberino.

With the introduction of professional football in Argentina, Boca won its 7th. league championship in 1931, defeating its main rival, River Plate by 3–0 in the last fixture. Boca scored 50 points, with a total of 22 victories, 6 draws and 6 losses. The line-up that reached the title in the 34th. fixture was: Fossatti; Muttis; Evaristo, Silenzi, Arico Suárez; Nardini, Tarasconi, Varallo, Cherro, Alberino.

In 1934 Boca won another title, although the team lost 7 matches and conceded 62 goals. Boca crowned in the round 38, when the team defeated Platense by 5–1. The key was in the power of the forwards, who scored 101 goals. Boca Juniors became the first team which scored more than 100 goals in the league. The line-up in the match vs. Platense was: Yustrich; Alves do Río, Bibí, Vernieres, Lazzatti, Arico Suárez; Zatelli, Benítez Cáceres, Varallo, Cherro, Cusatti.

When winning the 1935 season, Boca became the first successive champion of the professional era. The team also scored 100 goals and only conceded 29. Boca Juniors crowned champion in the 33rdh round, after defeating Tigre by 3–0. The line-up for that match was: Yustrich; Domingos, Valussi; Vernieres, Lazzatti, Arico Suárez; Tenorio, Benítez Cáceres, Varallo, Cherro, Garibaldi.

During the decade of the 1930s, some footballers such as Juan Yustrich (nicknamed El Pez Volador -The Flying Fish), Pedro Arico Suárez, Delfín Benítez Cáceres, Domingo Tarasconi, Roberto Cherro and Francisco Varallo were not only big stars but Boca Juniors great idols.

== The 1940s ==
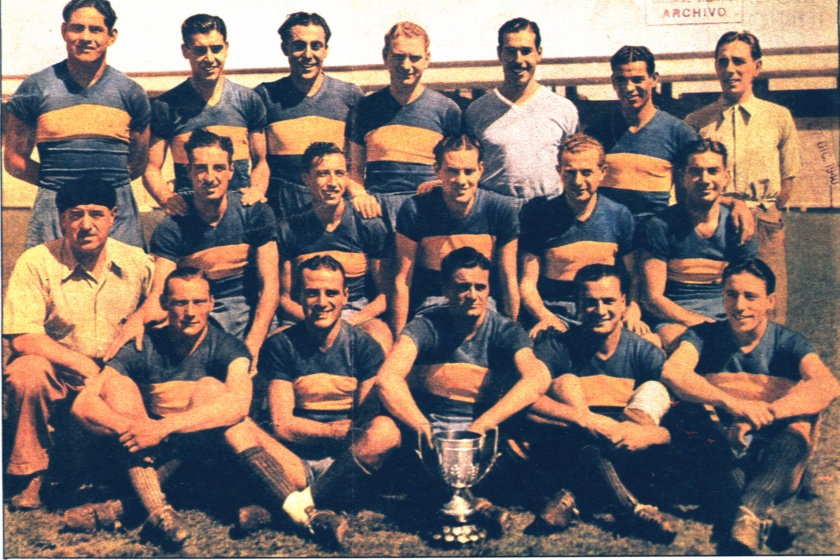
The 1940 champions.

During this period, Boca won three league championships in the 1940s, the same as the previous decade. The first title was obtained in 1940, the same year that La Bombonera was inaugurated. The key match was against Independiente, which Boca won 5–2 therefore crowning champion. The line-up was: Estrada; Ibáñez, Marante; A. López, Lazzatti, Arico Suárez; Sas, Carniglia, Sarlanga, Gandulla, Emeal. Boca won 24 games, drew 7 and lost 3. That same year Boca Juniors won the Copa Ibarguren (the 4th. for the club) after thrashing Rosario Central by 5–1 at Chacarita Juniors stadium. The line-up for that match was: Vacca; Ibáñez, Marante; A. López, Lazzatti, Arico Suárez; Gelpi, Carniglia, Sarlanga, Gandulla, Rossell.

In 1944 Boca would be (for the second time in its history) successive champion, when the squad defeated Racing by 3–0 in the last fixture. The game was played in River Plate stadium (because the Bombonera had been temporarily closed due to hooliganism incidents). Over 19 games Boca Juniors won 19, with 8 draws and 3 losses. The line-up for that match vs. Racing is still remembered as one of the greatest Boca all-time teams: Vacca; Marante, Valussi; Sosa, Lazzatti, Pescia; Boyé, Corcuera, Sarlanga, S. Varela, Sánchez. During that season, Boca also remained unbeaten for 26 consecutive matches, which was a record in the professional era until Racing broke this landmark when playing 39 matches without being defeated in 1966.

In 1944 Boca Juniors also won its 5th. Copa Ibarguren, when the squad beat the Tucumán combined by 3–0. The line-up was: Vacca; Melogno, De Zorzi; Sosa, Lazzatti, Pescia; Boyé, Corcuera, Sarlanga, Ricagni, Rodríguez.

Boca Juniors won other National cup in 1946, the Copa de Competencia Británica, when the squad defeated San Lorenzo by 3–1, playing again at River Plate stadium.

On the other hand, Boca was near to being relegated to Segunda División in 1949 but could keep its place in Primera with a large victory over Lanús in the last fixture. It was the first time that Boca finished last in any Primera División season.

== The 1950s and the Glorious 1960s ==
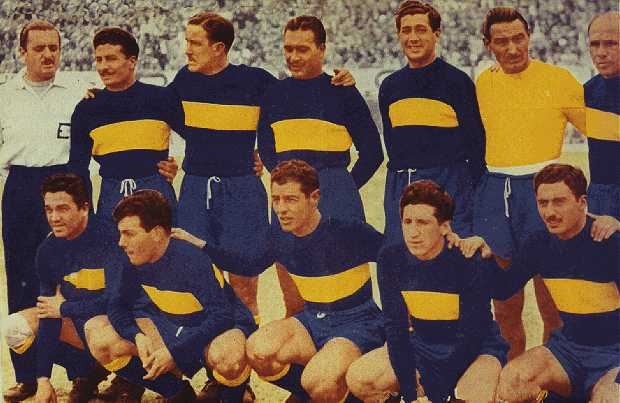
The 1954 champion

In 1954 Boca won its first title after nine unsuccessful years. The key match was against Huracán, which Boca won 3–1 obtaining the championship. The top scorer was José "Pepino" Borello (19 goals). Another outstanding player was Julio Musimessi, nicknamed "El arquero cantor" ("The singer goalkeeper").

Boca finished 8th in 1959 although the team won the two "Superclásicos" (5–1 and 3–2 after being behind 2–0).

On 9 December 1962, Boca won a legendary match defeating River Plate 1–0, with the highlight being goalkeeper Antonio Roma stopping a penalty shot by Delem when only 6 minutes were left till the end of the match. Boca finally won its first title of the decade in the next fixture with a great victory (4–0) over Estudiantes de La Plata, becoming new champion. During the 1960s, Boca Juniors won 5 championships.

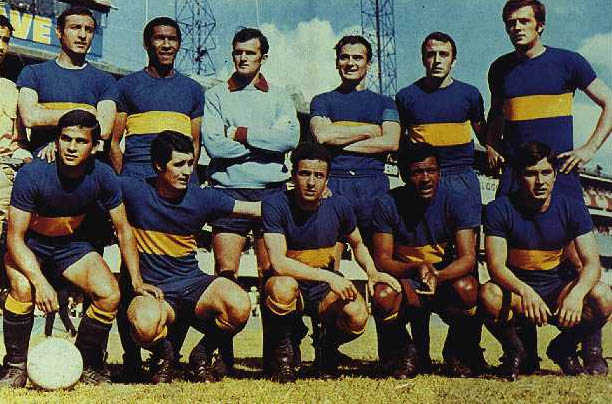
The team that won the Torneo Nacional in 1969.

The following title obtained was in 1964, with Antonio Roma not conceding a goal for 742 minutes, and conceding only one goal in 14 matches. In 1965 Boca became successive champions for the 3rd time in the professional era. The key matches were the victory over River Plate (2–1) and Atlanta in the last fixture.

In the 1968 Metropolitano championship during a Superclásico that ended 0–0, seventy-one Boca Juniors supporters died after being squashed against an exit door at River Plate Stadium, which remained closed at the moment of the fans left the stadium. This is still remembered as The Tragedy of the Gate No. 12 (La Tragedia de la Puerta 12).

In 1969 an official tournament named Copa Argentina was disputed. Teams included were those playing the Metropolitano and others outside Buenos Aires. Boca Juniors proclaimed champion after defeating Atlanta by goal average (the matches ended 3–1 and 0–1). Boca Juniors played a total of 10 matches, winning 7, with 1 draw and only 1 loss.

During the same year, Boca played its last match of the Nacional championship visiting River Plate at the Monumental. The match ended 2–2 (Norberto Madurga scored twice) proclaiming Boca as the new champion. The Xeneizes totalized 29 points, winning 13, with 3 draws and only 1 defeat and were coached by Alfredo Di Stéfano.

== 1970s: the second "Golden Age" ==
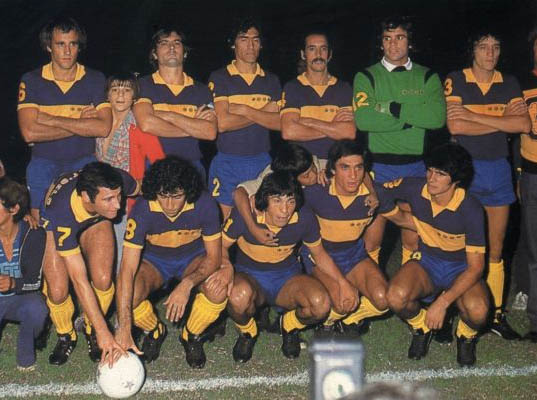
The Boca Juniors squad that played German team Borussia Moenchengladbach in La Bombonera, for the first leg of the Intercontinental Cup

In 1970 Boca won another title defeating Rosario Central in the final match of the Nacional tournament. In 1976 Juan Carlos Lorenzo arrived at the club. He would become one of the most successful coaches in the history of Boca Juniors, winning 5 official titles within 3 years. First of them was the 1976 Metropolitano, which Boca obtained after defeating Unión de Santa Fe by 2–0, one round before the end of the tournament.

The following tournament (1976 Nacional) Boca played a historic final match against arch-rival River Plate, winning 1–0 through a direct free kick goal scored by Rubén Suñé. Boca Juniors line-up was Gatti; Pernía, Sá, Mouzo, Tarantini; Ribolzi, Suñé, Veglio; Mastrángelo, Taverna, Felman (Zanabria). It was the only final played by both Superclásico teams up to present days.

That championship qualified Boca Juniors to play the 1977 Copa Libertadores, having reached the final match against Cruzeiro. After a victory 1–0 in Buenos Aires and a defeat in Belo Horizonte by the same score, it was necessary to play a third game, held in Estadio Centenario in Montevideo where Boca finally obtained the Libertadores for the first time, after a dramatic penalty shoot-out where Hugo Gatti stopped the last shot by Brazilian player Vanderley after the match ended 0–0. Starting line up was: Gatti, Pernía, Tesare, Mouzo, Tarantini; Benítez, Suñé (Ribolzi), Zanabria; Mastrángelo, Veglio, Felman.

The next title (and the most important of the decade) won by Boca Juniors was the 1977 edition of the Intercontinental Cup vs. German club Borussia Mönchengladbach (played one year later). The first leg played in Buenos Aires in March 1979 ended 2–2 (goals: Mastrángelo and Ribolzi) but Boca won the second game (played more than four months later, on August 1 in Karlsruhe) 3–0 and brought the trophy back to Argentina. The starting line-up in Germany was Santos; Pernía, Sá, Mouzo, Bordón; Benítez, Suñé, Zanabria; Mastrángelo, Pavón, Salinas. Goals were scored by Felman, Mastrángelo and Salinas.

Boca Juniors concluded the decade with another achievement by winning its second Copa Libertadores in 1978. The team defeated Deportivo Cali (coached by Carlos Bilardo) 4–0 in La Bombonera on 28 November, after the first leg in Colombia had ended 0-0. The goals were scored by Perotti (2), Mastrángelo and Salinas. Boca Juniors' line-up for the match was: Gatti, Pernía, Sá, Mouzo, Bordón; Benítez (Veglio), Suñé, Zanabria; Mastrángelo, Salinas, Perotti.

== 1980s: The Maradona revolution and few titles ==
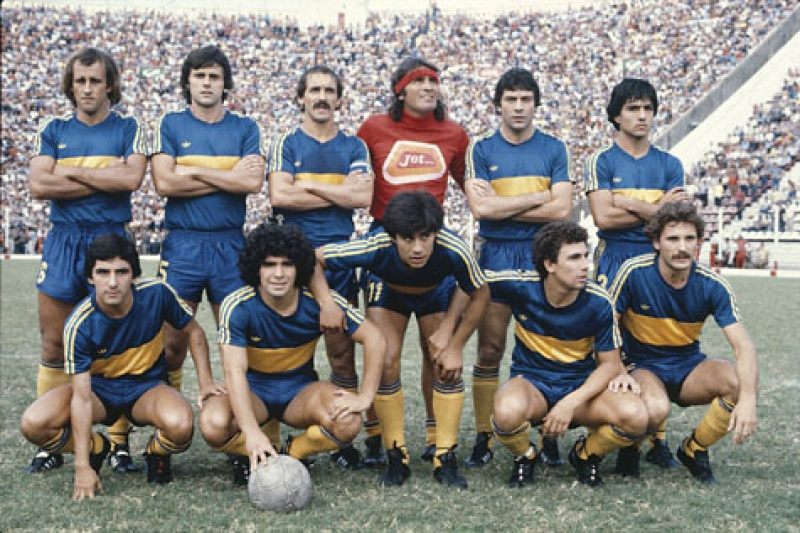
With the addition of superstar Diego Maradona (second from left, lower row) Boca Juniors won the Metropolitano championship in 1981

After a campaign in 1980 where the team was managed by club legend Antonio Rattín, the highlight of the 1980s was the acquisition of prodigious Diego Maradona, who came to the club along with Miguel Brindisi, Osvaldo Escudero, and Marcelo Trobbiani, while another club legend, Silvio Marzolini, was appointed as coach. Boca won its first title of the decade, the 1981 Metropolitano championship after a 1–1 draw v. Racing in the round 17th. The Xeneizes totalized 50 points, with 20 wins, 10 draws and 4 losses. The starting line-up v Racing was: Gatti; Suárez, Mouzo, Ruggeri, Córdoba; Benítez, Passucci, Brindisi; Estudero (Trobbiani), Maradona, Perotti. Maradona and Brindisi were highly regarded as the most notable players of the squad.

The following year, Boca lost the young Maradona, who moved to Europe to play for FC Barcelona, owing also to Argentina's political problems. In 1984 Boca was near to a financial collapse, almost going bankrupt. The same year the team suffered a catastrophic defeat at the hands of FC Barcelona, losing 1–9 in friendly competition Joan Gamper Trophy. After the departure of Marzolini in 1981, Boca Juniors hired several head coaches although the squad could not win any title until 1989. The list of managers includes Vladislao Cap, Carmelo Faraone, Raúl Rodríguez Seoane, Ernesto Grillo, Miguel Ángel López, Dino Sani, Mario Zanabria, Alfredo Di Stéfano, César Luis Menotti, Roberto Saporiti, Juan Carlos Lorenzo (in his second tenure on the club) and José Omar Pastoriza.

In 1985, Antonio Alegre and Carlos Heller were elected president and vice-president, respectively. Under their command, Boca settled 153 lawsuits early in his tenure by mortgaging his business assets for US$250,000, and by lending Boca Juniors US$800,000. These and other measures enabled them to recover the club's finances. Boca also sold the land acquired earlier for US$21 million.

The club's improved finances led to its revival, and Boca emerged victorious in a number of coveted tournaments in subsequent years, being the 1989 Supercopa Libertadores the last title of the decade, beating Independiente by penalty shoot-out after both legs ended 0–0. The team, managed by Carlos Aimar, achieve its first international honour since the 1978 Copa Libertadores. The starting line-up for the second leg was: Navarro Montoya; Stafuza, Simón, Marchesini, Cuciuffo; Giunta, Marangoni, J.D. Ponce, Latorre; Graciani (Pico), Perazzo (S. Berti).

== Early 1990s ==
The number of international titles won increased during the first part of the decade, with Boca Juniors winning the 1990 Recopa Sudamericana, the 1992 Copa Master de Supercopa and the 1993 Copa de Oro (named "Nicolás Leoz"). At the domestic level, the squad won the celebrated 1992 Apertura, after eleven years without league titles and managed by Uruguayan Óscar Tabárez, who had arrived to the club in 1991. Some of the most notable players of the late 1980s–early 1990s were Carlos Navarro Montoya (ranked 5th among the footballers who played the most matches with the club), Diego Latorre, Gabriel Batistuta, Juan Simón, Carlos Mac Allister, Carlos Tapia, Blas Giunta, Claudio Marangoni, Sergio Martínez, Alberto Márcico, Roberto Cabañas.

In 1995, entrepreneur Mauricio Macri was elected as president of the club. One of his first actions was to refurbish La Bombonera, demolishing the old boxes to build new ones. The club also built a basketball venue, Estadio Luis Conde (known as La Bombonerita) with a capacity of 2,000 spectators, inaugurated in 1996. Macri also created an investment fund for the purchase of football players. Macri also hired Jorge Griffa to manage the youth divisions of the club with the purpose of promoting new talents from Boca Juniors instead buying players from other clubs.

The first manager under Macri's presidency was former Argentina national team coach, Carlos Bilardo. His tenure lasted only one year, with no titles won despite the large number of players acquired, including Diego Maradona –who had returned to the club– Claudio Caniggia, Juan Verón, Kily González, Fernando Gamboa and Néstor Fabbri. Bilardo resigned after Boca Juniors finished 10th. in the 1996–97 season. Bilardo's successor was Héctor Veira, but he could not win any title with a team that had its best performance in the 1997 Apertura, finishing runner-up.

== The Bianchi era: another Golden Age ==
Former Vélez Sársfield coach Carlos Bianchi arrived at the club in 1998 and under his command, the squad would achieve multiple local and international titles, breaking the record obtained with Juan Carlos Lorenzo in the 1970s. With Carlos Bianchi as coach, Boca won 9 titles.

The first title obtained was the 1998 Apertura, which Boca won being undefeated for the first time. Martín Palermo was the top scorer with 20 goals in 19 matches played. Boca later won a new championship in the 1999 Clausura becoming successive champions. The team remained undefeated in 40 matches, breaking the record of 39 matches achieved by Racing Club in the 1960s. This mark is still a record in the professional era of Argentine football.

The year 2000 was the most successful for Boca Juniors. The team won the Copa Libertadores after 22 years without winning that trophy, defeating Palmeiras in the finals by penalty-shots after two matches ended in a draw (2–2 and 0–0). Goalkeeper Oscar Córdoba was the most notable player of the final played in São Paulo. As the new South America champion, Boca went to Tokyo to play the 2000 Intercontinental Cup against Real Madrid, defeating the Merengue team 2–1 (goals by Palermo). The same year Boca won another local title, the Torneo Apertura, totaling 3 titles in 2000.

In 2001 Boca were Copa Libertadores champion again, defeating Cruz Azul in a penalty shootout. Boca won 1–0 the first final match in Mexico and lost the second game in La Bombonera by the same score. Oscar Córdoba was the most notable player again.

Bianchi left the club in 2002 due to a conflict with the chairman Mauricio Macri, so Oscar Tabárez was chosen as his replacement beginning his second run as team's coach. Nevertheless, Bianchi would return the following year to take care of the team again. In 2003, Boca obtained a new title winning the Copa Libertadores for the 3rd time in 4 years. The most notable player of that tournament was Carlos Tevez while Marcelo Delgado was the top scorer with 9 goals. In the finals played against Santos FC, Boca won 2–0 in Buenos Aires and 3–1 in São Paulo. Boca Juniors completed another successful year winning the 2003 Intercontinental Cup against AC Milan by penalty-shot after a 1–1 draw. Matías Donnet, who tied the game in the 29th minute, was named the Man of the Match.

Boca reached another Copa Libertadores final in 2004, but lost to Once Caldas from Manizales, Colombia in PK's. Once the Cup was over, Bianchi resigned, finishing one of the most successful periods in the club history.

== Basile's multi-champion ==
After Bianchi's departure from the club, Miguel Brindisi (who had played for the club in the 1980s) was chosen as coach but he soon resigned at the end of the 2004 Apertura, when Boca finished 8th. The successor of Brindisi was Jorge Chino Benítez, another player for Boca in the 1970s and 1980s. Under his coaching, Boca won the 2004 Copa Sudamericana defeating Club Bolívar in the finals.

In 2005 (the year of Boca's 100th anniversary) the Xeneize contested another edition of the Copa Libertadores, being eliminated by Chivas de Guadalajara with a heavy 4-0 loss in the first leg, their worst loss in the Libertadores since losing 6-1 against Palmeiras in 1994. In that match, Benítez spat at the Chivas player Adolfo Bautista, causing a melee which resulted in the referee abandoning the match. Due to this act, Benítez was immediately dismissed by the club. After Benítez's dismissal, Boca hired Alfio Basile as its coach.

With Basile as the coach, Boca won the 2005 Recopa Sudamericana, defeating Once Caldas, and the 2005 Copa Sudamericana, where the Xeneize won over Pumas from Mexico by penalty-shots after two draws. Roberto Abbondanzieri was the MVP, stopping two shots and converting the decisive penalty kick. Boca would win two titles more: the 2005 Apertura and 2006 Clausura becoming the successive champion of Argentine football. The squad also obtained the 2006 Recopa Sudamericana over São Paulo.

After the elimination of the Argentina national team in the 2006 World Cup, Basile was called by the National Association to take over and left the club under a successful run. Under the coaching of Basile, Boca Juniors won five titles within two years (2005–06).

== More international success ==
Ricardo Lavolpe was chosen to be the coach succeeding Basile. In the 2006 Apertura the team made a good campaign but at the end of the season finished with the same number of points as Estudiantes de La Plata, so both teams had to play a match in order to proclaim a new champion. Estudiantes defeated Boca 2–1 in Vélez Sársfield stadium and Lavolpe resigned as the coach.

The next coach was Miguel Ángel Russo and Juan Román Riquelme returned to the club. Boca Juniors won the 2007 Copa Libertadores defeating Brazilian team Gremio in the finals (3–0 in Buenos Aires and 2–0 in Porto Alegre). Riquelme (who scored 8 goals) was considered to be the best player of the tournament by journalists and fans. As the South American champion, Boca went to Tokyo to dispute the FIFA Club World Cup but was defeated by Italian AC Milan by 4–2.

Carlos Ischia was appointed as coach after Russo's departure. Under his coaching, the club won the 2008 Recopa Sudamericana (against Arsenal de Sarandí). On the other hand, Boca was eliminated by Fluminense (which would be the runner up) in the 2008 Copa Libertadores semi-finals. At the end of that year Boca obtained a new title, the 2008 Apertura. That season ended with Boca, San Lorenzo and Tigre in equal 1st position so a play-off tournament had to be contested among those 3 teams in order to proclaim a new champion. Boca won that tournament and became new Argentine champion. That same season Boca's arch-rival River Plate finished the last for the first time in its history.

Boca finished 14th (over 19 teams) in the 2009 Clausura and Ischia was dismissed by the club (although the managers said he had resigned) and Basile was called to start his second run as coach. Nevertheless, after finishing 11th in the 2009 Apertura, Basile left the club.

== 2010s: local success continues ==
For the 2010 Clausura the team was coached firstly by Abel Alves and then by Roberto Pompei, who were working with the youth teams when they were appointed to coach the first division team. Boca finished 16th so the club decided to hire Claudio Borghi (who had won a title coaching Argentinos Juniors the last season) as team's new coach, but he left the club after 14 matches, due to the bad results obtained. Roberto Pompei was designated to be the coach until the end of the Apertura. Boca finished in 12th position.

In January 2011, Boca hired Julio Falcioni who had won a title coaching Banfield in 2009. The team did not have a good campaign in the Clausura, although Boca won the Superclásico (the last played before River was relegated to the second division) finishing 7th. In the last fixture (when Boca played against Gimnasia y Esgrima de La Plata) Martín Palermo, the all-time top scorer, retired.

For the 2011 Apertura, Boca acquired goalkeeper Agustín Orión and veteran centre back Rolando Schiavi, who returned after his tenure at Newell's Old Boys. After three years without any achievements, Boca won its 30th. league title when the squad defeated Banfield by 3–0 on round 17. The line-up was Orion; Roncaglia, Schiavi, Insaurralde, Clemente Rodríguez; Rivero, Somoza, Erviti; Chávez; Mouche, Cvitanich. Boca Juniors completed the tournament remaining unbeaten, with 12 wins and 7 draws. The team also conceded the fewest goals (only 6 in 19 matches disputed) which set a record for short tournaments in Argentina (after Clausura and Apertura championships were established in 1991). That same season, Boca also won the second edition of the relaunched Copa Argentina, after beating Racing Club at the final. Some changes in the line-up were goalkeeper Ustari, defender Caruzzo and forwards Viatri and Silva.

In 2012, Boca reached the final of Copa Libertadores, five years after having won the 2007 final, but the squad lost to Brazilian Corinthians by 3–1 on aggregate. On the knockout stages, the squad had previously eliminated Unión Española, Fluminense and Universidad de Chile.

In 2013, it was confirmed that Carlos Bianchi, the most successful coach in Boca Juniors' history, would return to take care of the team again. On August 28, 2014, after 74 matches with only 45 percent effectiveness (26 wins and losses), having conceded 88 and scored 79 goals and without any championships, Bianchi was dismissed by the club.

After dismissing Bianchi, former player Rodolfo Arruabarrena was hired as manager of the club. With Arruabarrena as coach, Boca Juniors qualified to the semifinals of 2014 Copa Sudamericana but it was defeated by River Plate (0–1 on aggregate). The next year, Boca Juniors was disqualified from the 2015 Copa Libertadores by CONMEBOL following the incidents that occurred during the match against River Plate at La Bombonera. The sentence came after four River Plate players, Leonardo Ponzio, Leonel Vangioni, Ramiro Funes Mori and Matías Kranevitter suffered a "chemical kerititis", an inflammation of the cornea, as a result of the exposure to chemicals during the second leg match against Boca at La Bombonera. Prior to those incidents, Boca Juniors had won all the games at group stage finishing with 18 points and only 2 goals conceded in 6 games played.

After the frustration at Copa Libertadores, Boca would win its 31st league title, the 2015 Primera División on November 1, when the team defeated Tigre in the penultimate fixture of the championship with a goal scored by Fabián Monzón. The line-up for that match was Orión; Peruzzi, Tobio, Rolín, Monzón; Pablo Pérez (Bentancur), Cubas, Meli, Lodeiro (Colazo); Tevez, Calleri (Chávez). Tevez (who had left Juventus to join Boca Juniors at the beginning of that year) was the keyplayer of the team. Only three days after winning the Primera División title, Boca Juniors won the 2014–15 Copa Argentina beating Rosario Central by 2–0 (goals by Lodeiro and Chávez) in a match played at Estadio Mario Alberto Kempes of Córdoba. The match became controversial due to referee Gustavo Ceballos disallowed a Rosario Central goal and awarded Boca Juniors a penalty kick after the foul was committed outside the penalty area. The starting line-up v Rosario Central was: Orión; Peruzzi, Tobio, D. Díaz, Monzón; Meli, Erbes, P. Pérez (Bentancur), Lodeiro (Rolín); Calleri (Chávez), Tevez.

== The Barros Schelotto era ==
On February 29, 2016, Arruabarrena was dismissed as Boca Juniors manager. Under his coaching, the squad won two titles in 75 games, winning 47, drawing 13 and losing 15. On March 1, Guillermo Barros Schelotto was announced as the new manager, being his third time as manager in a professional football team. He returned to the club after his tenure as player between 1997 and 2007 where he won 16 titles.

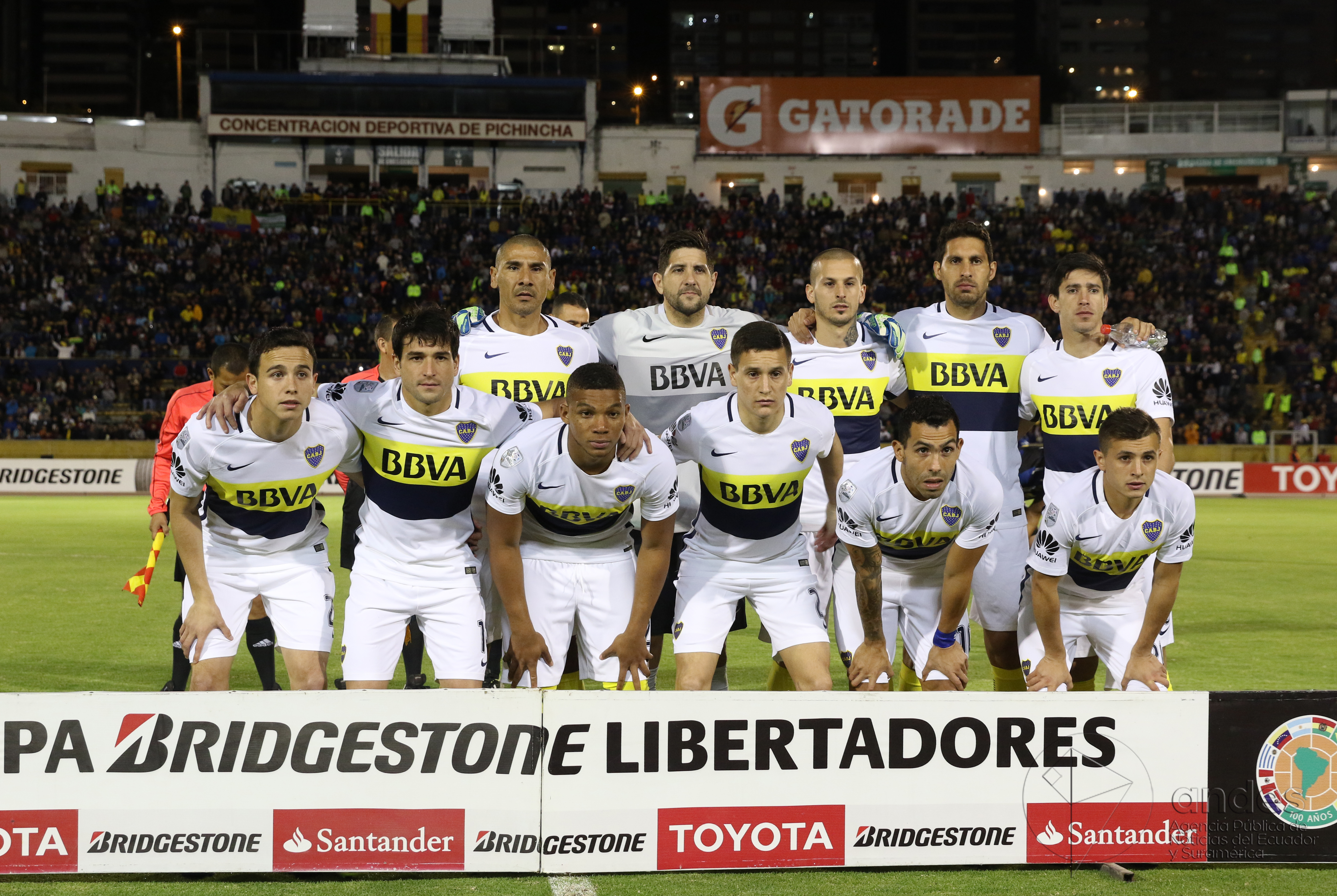
Boca Juniors team in 2016 Copa Libertadores

Under Barros Schelotto's coaching, Boca reached the semifinals in the 2016 Copa Libertadores after beating Uruguayan Nacional by penalties but the team was eliminated by Ecuadorean Independiente del Valle after losing the two legs (1–2 and 2–3). At domestic level, Boca Juniors won its 32nd league title, the 2016–17 Primera División, where the team crowned champion on June 20, 2017, before playing the 29th round v. Olimpo in Bahía Blanca. The starting line-up was: Rossi; Jara, Tobio (Vergini), Magallán, Silva; Gago, Barrios, Pablo Pérez; Pavón, Benedetto (Bou), Centurión (Benítez). Boca totalised 63 points in 30 matches (7 points over its rival River Plate, runner-up with 56). Besies, Benedetto was the topscorer of the competition with 21 goals.

Boca Juniors won its second consecutive league title in 2017–18, totalising 58 points over 27 matches (Godoy Cruz was the runner-up with 56). Boca crowned champion after a 2–2 tie with Gimnasia y Esgrima LP in round 25 (goals by P. Pérez and Ábila). The starting line-up was: Rossi; Jara, Vergini, Magallán, Mas; Nández, S. Pérez, P. Pérez; Tevez (Benítez); Pavón (Buffarini), Ábila (Cardona).

In November 2018 Boca played a Copa Libertadores final after 6 years. The team had previously eliminated Brazilian clubs Cruzeiro (2–0, 1–1 in quarterfinals) and Palmeiras (2–0, 2–2 in semifinals). In the finals, Boca lost to River Plate (5–3 on aggregate). Because of the incidents by River supporters before the second leg started at Estadio Monumental, the match was suspended and rescheduled for December 9, 2018 at Santiago Bernabeu Stadium, where Boca was beaten by its classic rival.

== Last years ==
In 2019, Gustavo Alfaro was appointed as manager of the team. With him, Boca won the 2018 Supercopa Argentina after beating Rosario Central 6–5 by penalty shoot-out. This would be the only title won with Alfaro so that same season, Boca lost the 2019 Copa de la Superliga to Tigre (0–2). It was also the Matador first title in the top division. Boca Juniors was also eliminated from 2018–19 Copa Argentina after losing to Almagro 3–1 on penalties.

In 2019 Copa Libertadores Boca was eliminated to River Plate by goal difference (1–2 on aggregate). In December 2019, Jorge Amor Ameal was elected as president with media entrepreneur Mario Pergolini and former star Román Riquelme as vice–presidents. Gustavo Alfaro left the club after his contract ended on December 23, being replaced by Miguel Ángel Russo who started his second tenure as manager of the team.

The first title with Russo came in March 2020, after Boca Juniors won the 2019–20 Primera División in the last fixture, when the team beat Gimnasia y Esgrima LP (coached by Diego Maradona) 1–0. With archrival River Plate placed first with 46 points and Boca 2nd with 45, Boca Juniors won the match while River tied 1–1 with Atlético Tucumán therefore Boca won its 34th. league title totalising 48 points. Line-up v Gimnasia was: Andrada; Buffarini, Zambrano (Capaldo), Alonso, Fabra; Salvio (Reynoso), Campuzano, Pol Fernández, Villa; Soldano (Ábila), Tevez.
