= Víctor Valussi =

Argentine footballer

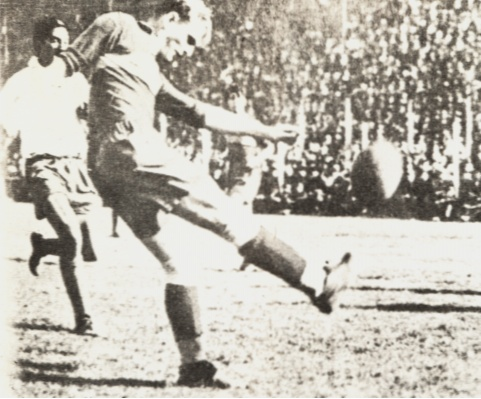

Personal information
- Full name: Víctor Miguel Valussi
- Date of birth: 8 May 1912
- Place of birth: Resistencia, Argentina
- Date of death: 1 April 1995 (aged 82)
- Position: Defender

Senior career*
Years	Team	Apps	(Gls)
1933–1934	Chacarita Juniors	40	(0)
1935–1936	Boca Juniors	55	(0)
1937	Tigre	23	(0)
1938–1945	Boca Juniors	204	(0)
1946–?	Tampico Madero	?	(?)

International career
1940–1942	Argentina	9	(0)
- * Club domestic league appearances and goals

Víctor Miguel Valussi (8 May 1912 - 1 April 1995) was an Argentine football defender who won four league championships with Boca Juniors and played for the Argentina national team.

== Playing career ==
=== Club ===
Valussi began his playing career in 1933 with Chacarita Juniors, in 1935 he joined reigning Argentine champions Boca Juniors and helped them to retain their championship in 1935. He made his debut for the club in a 2–1 home win against Vélez Sársfield on 17 March 1935.

In 1937 he spent a season with Club Atlético Tigre but returned to Boca the following year. He won three more championships with Boca in 1940, 1943 and 1944.

Valussi left Boca in 1945 after playing a total of 274 games for Boca in all competitions, he joined Mexican side Tampico Madero.

=== International ===
Valussi made 9 appearances for the Argentina national team, his debut came against Brazil on 18 February 1940 in a game which ended 2-2. He played in Copa América 1942.

== Titles ==
- Primera División Argentina (4): 1935, 1940, 1943, 1944
