= Arico Suárez =

Spanish-Argentine footballer

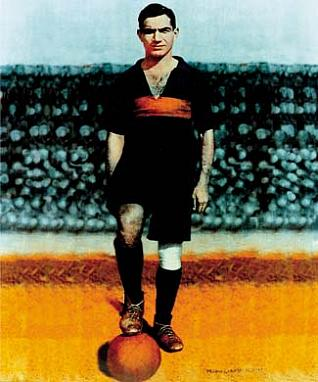
- Suárez with Boca Juniors c. 1936

Personal information
- Full name: Pedro Bonifacio Suárez Pérez
- Date of birth: 5 June 1908
- Place of birth: Santa Brígida, Gran Canaria, Spain
- Date of death: 18 April 1979 (aged 70)
- Place of death: Buenos Aires, Argentina
- Height: 1.67 m (5 ft 5 1/2 in)
- Position: Left-half

Senior career*
Years	Team	Apps	(Gls)
1926–1930	Ferro Carril Oeste		
1930–1942	Boca Juniors	311	(1)

International career
1930–1940	Argentina	12	(1)
Medal record
Men's Football
Representing Argentina
FIFA World Cup
Runner-up	1930 Uruguay	Team
- * Club domestic league appearances and goals

Pedro Bonifacio Suárez Pérez, commonly known as Arico Suárez or Pedro Suárez (5 June 1908, in Gran Canaria, Spain – 18 April 1979, in Buenos Aires, Argentina), was a Spanish-Argentine football left half who played for Boca Juniors where he won five league championships and for the Argentina national team, including appearances at the inaugural FIFA World Cup in 1930, making him the only Canary Islander to play in the World Cup until Juan Carlos Valerón played the 2002 edition.

== Playing career ==
=== Club ===
Suárez was born in Santa Brígida (Gran Canaria) but emigrated to Argentina with his parents at a young age. He began his playing career in 1926 with Ferro Carril Oeste where he played until his transfer to Boca Juniors in 1930.

In his first season with Boca, Suárez was part of the team that won the 1930 league championship. Over the following decade he won afurther four league championships in 1931, 1934, 1935 and 1940. He also won the Copa Ibarguren in 1940. Arico made a total of 335 appearances in all competitions, scoring one goal which came in a 2–2 draw with Platense on 6 August 1933.

=== International ===
Suárez made his international debut for Argentina during the 1930 FIFA World Cup, he would go on to make a total of 12 appearances for the Argentina national team between 1930 and 1940.

== Honours ==
Boca Juniors

- Primera División Argentina (5): 1930, 1931, 1934, 1935, 1940
- Copa Ibarguren (1): 1940

Argentina

- FIFA World Cup: Runner-up 1930
