= Boca Juniors' 1925 tour of Europe =

Argentine sports club tour in Europe

1925 Boca Juniors tour to Europe
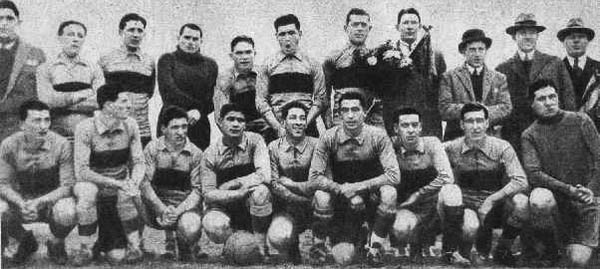
- Players and executives that toured
- Date: Mar–Jun 1925
- Venue: Various
- Location: Spain Germany France
- Type: Exhibition games
- Theme: Association football
- First reporter: 5 March 1925
- Participants: Boca Juniors plus several European sides

A highlight in the history of Boca Juniors was their 1925 European tour, where the club toured Europe, playing a series of friendly matches from March 5 to June 7, 1925, becoming the first Argentine team to play there. Boca Juniors played a total of 19 matches, 13 in Spain, 5 in Germany, and 1 in France, winning 15, with 3 losses and 1 draw. The squad scored 40 goals and conceded 16, with a win percentage of 78.95%.

The delegation included executive representatives such as vice president Adelio Cariboni and secretary Vicente Decap. The roster was Américo Tesoriere, Ludovico Bidoglio, Ramón Muttis, Segundo Médici, Alfredo Elli, Mario Busso, Domingo Tarasconi, Antonio Cerrotti, Dante Pertini, Carmelo Pozzo, Carlos Antraygues and Alfredo Garasini. Some players from other clubs were also added to the team especially for the tour: Manuel Seoane (El Porvenir), Cesáreo Onzari (Huracán), Luis Vaccaro (Argentinos Juniors), Octavio Díaz (Rosario Central) and Roberto Cochrane (Tiro Federal). Tarasconi and Elli were designed as managers.

Manuel Seoane was the topscorer of the tour, with 12 goals in 16 games played. Because of the successful result, the Argentine Football Association (AFA) crowned Boca Juniors as "Champion of Honor".

== Background ==
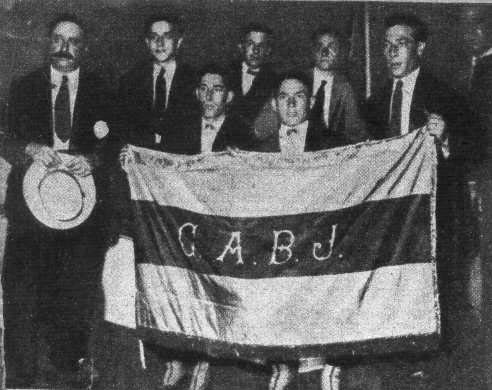
Pozzo, Vaccaro and Medice holding a Boca Juniors flag, a gift from Jockey Club of Buenos Aires.

Inspired by the recognition gained by the Uruguay national football team in the 1924 Olympic Games after their squad won the tournament, the Argentine Football Association planned to send the Argentina national team on a tour of Europe. However, the project was not carried out, so the executives of Boca Juniors offered to send their club's team to replace the Argentine side. The request was accepted by the AFA and Boca followed in the footsteps of Uruguayan team Nacional, that had toured Europe a few months before.

The tour was organised by three representatives of Spanish immigrants to Argentina: Zapater, Isasmendi and Ibáñez, who thus became the first entrepreneurs in Argentine football. It is also believed that the original idea of a tour came from Natalio Botana, director of Crítica, the main newspaper of the day. The club had to pay each player A$10 per day as expenses. Finally, on February 4, 1925, the team departed for Europe aboard the steamship De la Carrera, with a large number of fans (about 10,000) saying goodbye to the players at the port. In Montevideo the delegation transhipped to a passenger ship, the Formosa, which took 22 days to reach Vigo, in Spain.

"Never before had so many people been seen as the large amount of fans that attended the port of Buenos Aires to say goodbye to a sports delegation (...) Hats and handkerchiefs were thrown into the air as a sign of farewell"

— La Nación, 1925

The delegation was accompanied by a Boca Juniors fan named Victoriano Caffarena, who not only financed part of the tour, but also helped the players as an occasional masseur and kit manager. Caffarana was recognised as the 12th player (the nickname was given by Tesoriere and Cerrotti), an appellation that would be later applied to every supporter of Boca Juniors .

== Touring squad ==
| Player | Pos. | P | G |
|---|---|---|---|
| Américo Tesoriere | GK | 13 | 0 |
| Octavio Díaz (Note: Player of Rosario Central, reinforcement for the tour.) | GK | 6 | 0 |
| Ludovico Bidoglio | DF | 18 | 0 |
| Roberto Cochrane | DF | 12 | 0 |
| Ángel Médici | DF | 19 | 0 |
| Ramón Muttis | DF | 10 | 0 |
| Mario Busso | MF | 3 | 0 |
| Alfredo Elli | MF | 17 | 0 |
| Luis Vaccaro | MF | 15 | 0 |
| Carlos Antraygues | FW | 5 | 2 |
| Antonio Cerrotti | FW | 19 | 10 |
| Alfredo Garasini | FW | 12 | 3 |
| Cesáreo Onzari (Note: Player of Huracán, reinforcement for the tour.) | FW | 17 | 3 |
| Dante Pertini | FW | 8 | 0 |
| Carmelo Pozzo | FW | 2 | 3 |
| Manuel Seoane (Note: Player of Independiente, reinforcement for the tour.) | FW | 16 | 12 |
| Domingo Tarasconi | FW | 18 | 7 |

== Tour summary ==
=== Spain ===
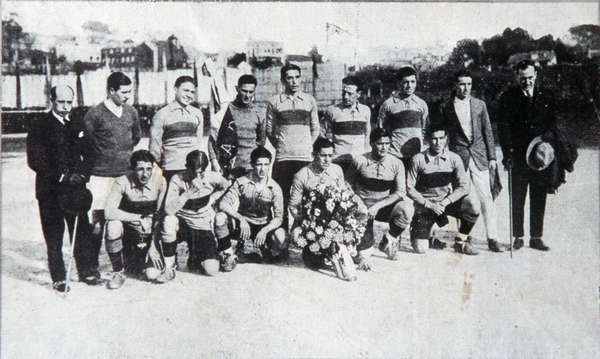
Team that played the first match of the tour v. Celta de Vigo on March 5, 1925.

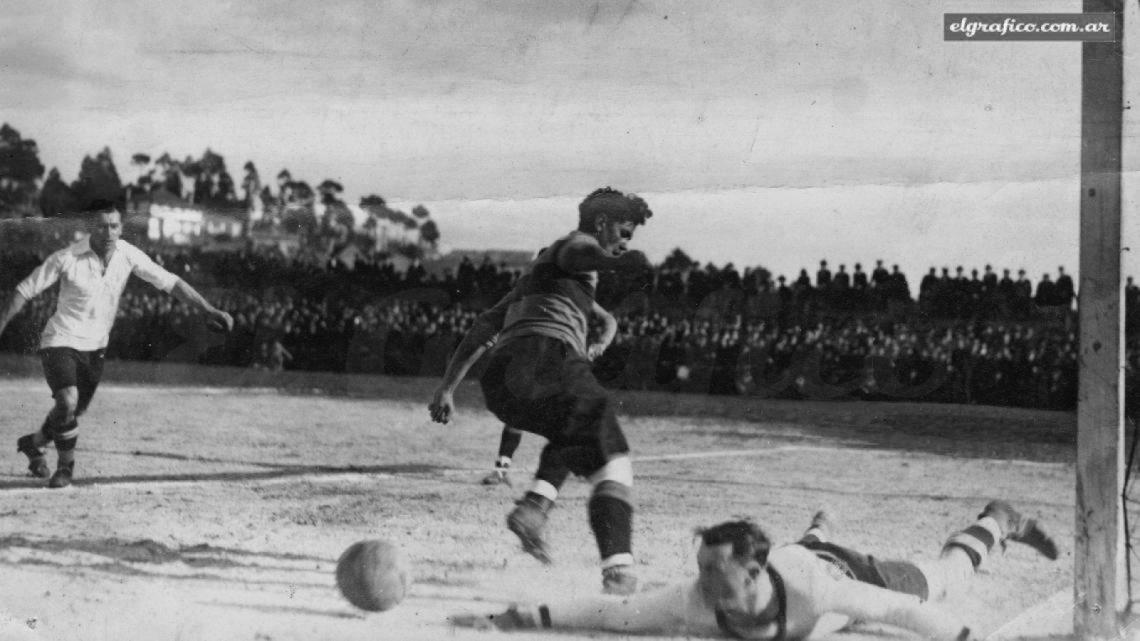
The Celta de Vigo goalkeeper facing Manuel Seoane.

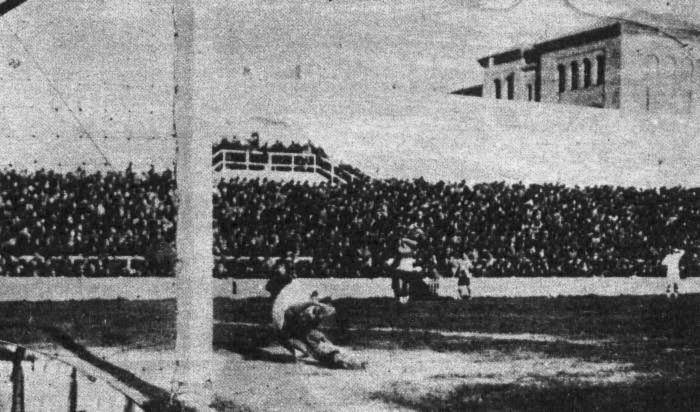
Pozzo scoring the only goal of Boca Juniors v. Real Madrid.

The first match of the tour was played on March 5, 1925, v. Celta de Vigo before an attendance of 25,000 spectators. Antonio Cerrotti opened the scoring after only 2 minutes, becoming the first Argentine footballer to score a goal in Europe. During the match, the roof of a nearby factory collapsed under the weight of several workers watching the match, causing the game to be suspended for 16 minutes. Boca Juniors went on to win the match by 3–1. Three days later, a second game was played between Boca and Celta, and the local team won by the same score.

After their matches against Celta, Boca Juniors moved to La Coruña to play two games against the local team, Deportivo de La Coruña, on March 12th and 15th respectively. Boca Juniors won the first game by 3–0; and Tesoriere became the first Argentine goalkeeper to make a save from a penalty kick. Boca also won their second game against La Coruña by 1–0. Following these victories, Boca travelled to Madrid where the squad defeated Atlético de Madrid by 2–1 and three days later beat Real Madrid by 1–0. King Alfonso XIII and his son Alfonso, Prince of Asturias were among the spectators at the match. After 10 minutes play, the referee stopped the game to allow players to salute the royal pair.

The last match played by Boca Juniors in the city was against Sociedad Gimnástica Española, where Vaccaro was injured, and so missed the rest of the tour.

Boca Juniors then moved on to Bilbao, where the team lost first to Real Unión de Irún by 4–0 and then Athletic Bilbao by 4–2. In the match against Athletic, the players abandoned the field as a protest over a penalty kick awarded to the local team. However, the squad returned shortly after and the game was completed.

Their tour of Spain continued in Pamplona, where Boca Juniors defeated Osasuna by 1–0, and finished in Barcelona where Boca defeated RCD Espanyol twice (1–0 and 3–0) and then a Catalonia combined XI by 2–0.

=== Germany and France ===
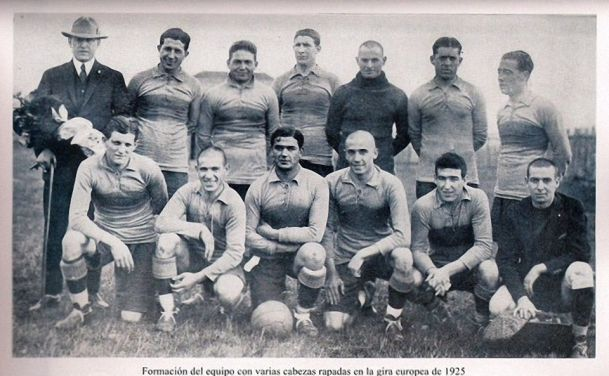
One of Boca Juniors line-ups during the European tour

Boca had planned to continue their tour in France after their last game in Spain. However, the two consecutive losses to Real Unión and Athletic Bilbao made the French organisers to turn their back on their decision. As a result, the team went to Munich, Germany. There, Boca played Bayern Munich on May 9, then moved to Berlin where they defeated Nord West. Some days later, in Leipzig, Boca achieved their largest victory of the tour when the squad thrashed SpVgg Leipzig 7–0.

Finally, the team finished their tour in Frankfurt where they played two further games. The good results in Germany caused the French organisers to reconsider, with a friendly match arranged between a French team and Boca Juniors. Therefore, the team extended the tour, playing one more game in Paris, where Boca Juniors defeated a local combined XI by 4–2 with three goals from Manuel Seoane.

== List of results ==
Complete list of games and results:

Details
| # | Date | Rival | Res. | Score | Venue | City | Boca Juniors goals |
|---|---|---|---|---|---|---|---|
| 1 | 5 Mar | (Spain) Celta Vigo | W | 3–1 | Campo de Coia | Vigo | Cerrotti (2), Onzari |
| 2 | 8 Mar | (Spain) Celta Vigo | L | 1–3 | Campo de Coia | Vigo | Garasini |
| 3 | 12 Mar | (Spain) Deportivo La Coruña | W | 3–0 | Parque de Riazor | La Coruña | Onzari, Antraygues, Cerrotti |
| 4 | 15 Mar | (Spain) Deportivo La Coruña | W | 1–0 | Parque de Riazor | La Coruña | Tarasconi |
| 5 | 19 Mar | (Spain) Atlético Madrid | W | 2–1 | At. Madrid Stadium | Madrid | Antraygues, Cerrotti |
| 6 | 22 Mar | (Spain) Real Madrid | W | 1–0 | Estadio Chamartín | Madrid | Pozzo |
| 7 | 29 Mar | (Spain) Sociedad Gimnástica | W | 1–0 | Estadio Chamartín | Madrid | Seoane |
| 8 | 2 Apr | (Spain) Real Unión | L | 0–4 | Estadio de Amute | Irun | – |
| 9 | 5 Apr | (Spain) Athletic Bilbao | L | 2–4 | San Mamés Stadium | Bilbao | Tarasconi, Cerrotti |
| 10 | 19 Apr | (Spain) Osasuna | W | 1–0 | Osasuna Stadium | Pamplona | Seoane |
| 11 | 26 Apr | (Spain) Espanyol | W | 1–0 | Sarrià Stadium | Barcelona | Tarasconi |
| 12 | 1 May | (Spain) Espanyol | W | 3–0 | Sarrià Stadium | Barcelona | Seoane (2), Tarasconi |
| 13 | 3 May | (Spain) Catalonia Combined | W | 2–0 | Sarrià Stadium | Barcelona | Cerrotti, Tarasconi |
| 14 | 9 May | (Germany) Bayern Munich | D | 1–1 | Teutonia Platz | Munich | Seoane |
| 15 | 16 May | (Germany) Norden-Nordwest | W | 3–0 | Norden-Nordwest Plast | Berlin | Garasini, Tarasconi, Seoane |
| 16 | 21 May | (Germany) SpVgg Leizipg | W | 7–0 | Karl Enders Sportspark | Leipzig | Cerrotti (2), Pozzo (2), Tarasconi, Onzari, Garasini |
| 17 | 24 May | (Germany) Frankfurt Combined | W | 2–0 | Municipal Stadium | Frankfurt | Cerrotti, Seoane |
| 18 | 27 May | (Germany) Eintracht Frankfurt | W | 2–0 | Municipal Stadium | Frankfurt | Seoane (2) |
| 19 | 7 Jun | (France) Paris Combined | W | 4–2 | Stade Bergeyre | Paris | Seoane (3), Cerrotti |

=== Statistics ===
Summary
| P | W | D | L | Gf | Ga |
|---|---|---|---|---|---|
| 19 | 15 | 1 | 3 | 40 | 16 |

=== Topscorers ===
| # | Player | Goals |
|---|---|---|
| 1 | Manuel Seoane | 12 |
| 2 | Antonio Cerrotti | 10 |
| 3 | Domingo Tarasconi | 7 |
| 4 | Alfredo Garasini | 3 |
| 4 | Cesáreo Onzari | 3 |
| 4 | Carmelo Pozzo | 3 |
| 5 | Carlos Antraygues | 2 |

== Return to Argentina ==
The team arrived in Buenos Aires on July 12, 1925, after a trip that took over a month. The squad was awaited by a crowd of people that received them as heroes. The Argentine Association crowned Boca Juniors as "Champion of Honor", an honorary title (unofficial) in recognition to the great campaign during the tour. Boca Juniors did not participate in the 1925 championship that was won by Huracán.

After the players came back to their clubs, Boca returned to the official competition in 1926, when the squad won the Primera División championship remaining unbeaten at the end of the tournament. Boca won 15 matches over 17 played.

== Financial cost ==
Despite being successful in terms of sports results, the tour caused a large deficit in Boca Juniors' finances and was followed by a huge controversy that forced Manlio Anastasi to resign as president of the club. Nevertheless, most of blame was on club executive and businessman Félix Isasmendi. He was accused of bad negotiation so Boca Juniors earned low payments from the European clubs, apart from not taking percentage of ticket selling.

The European clubs are business rather than sports clubs, which being assured that matches would collect the double, triple, or quadruple than usual, offered ridicule payments instead.

— Boca Juniors executive Héctor Manni about the tour

Summarizing, Boca Juniors was paid near MN$60,000. On the other hand, costs were MN$54,000 for boat tickets and player salaries plus NN$32,000 for accommodation and trip expenses.

== Social impact ==
The huge success achieved by Boca Juniors brought immediate consequences for the club. The team was acclaimed by both, media and fans, gaining recognition and popularity. Before the tour, Boca Juniors was a club that represented a neighborhood (La Boca), being considered a local team. As a result of the great campaign in Europe, Boca Juniors became a national institution, with fans through the country.
