= Juan Yustrich =

Argentine footballer

Juan Elias Yustrich
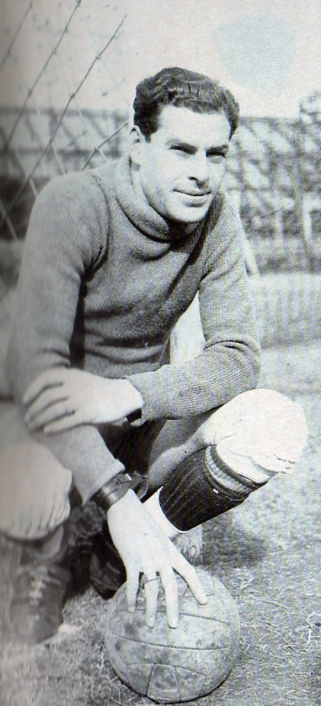

Personal information
- Full name: Juan Elías Yustrich
- Date of birth: July 9, 1909
- Place of birth: Rosario, Argentina
- Date of death: October 6, 2002 (aged 93)
- Position: Goalkeeper

Youth career
- Provincial de Rosario

Senior career*
Years	Team	Apps	(Gls)
1932–1937	Boca Juniors	173	(0)
1938–1939	Gimnasia (LP)	48	(0)
1940–1941	Lanús	53	(0)

International career
	Argentina	1	(0)
- * Club domestic league appearances and goals

Juan Elías Yustrich (9 July 1909 – 6 October 2002) was an Argentine football goalkeeper who won two league championships with Boca Juniors.

Yustrich was born in Rosario, Argentina to Croat parents, originally Justrić. He started playing with Provincial de Rosario and was signed by Boca Juniors in 1932 as a replacement for Domingo Fossatti. He made his debut on 13 March 1932 in a 5–2 win over Atlanta and soon established himself as the regular goalkeeper for the club and earned himself the nickname "El pez volador" (The flying fish) for his athletic saves.

Yustrich was the goalkeeper for Boca's back to back championships in 1934 and 1935. He left the club in December 1937 after making 183 appearances for the club in all competitions, his final game for the club was an 8–0 home win against Tigre on 19 December 1937.

After leaving Boca, Yustrich continued his career with Gimnasia y Esgrima de La Plata between 1938 and 1939 and with Lanús between 1940 and 1941.

During his career he made one appearance for the Argentina national team

Yustrich died of a cerebral ischemia in Hospital Británico, Buenos Aires on 6 October 2002, aged 93.

== Honours ==
Boca Juniors

- Primera División Argentina (2): 1934, 1935
