= Evaristo Barrera =

Argentine footballer and manager

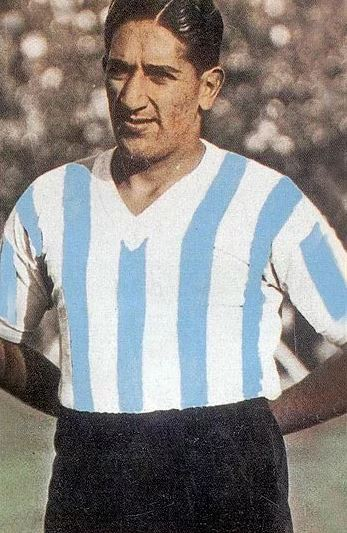

Personal information
- Full name: Evaristo Vicente Barrera
- Date of birth: December 30, 1911
- Place of birth: Rosario, Argentina
- Date of death: June 7, 1982 (aged 70)
- Position: Striker

Senior career*
Years	Team	Apps	(Gls)
1932–1938	Racing Club	142	(136)
1939–1940	Lazio	16	(6)
1940–1942	Napoli	47	(12)
1942–1943	Ascoli		
1944	Novara		
1945	Gozzano		
1945–1946	Cremonese		
1947–1948	Mortara		

Managerial career
- 1956–1958: Novara
- * Club domestic league appearances and goals

Evaristo Vicente Barrera (December 30, 1911 – June 7, 1982) was an Argentine football striker. He played for Racing Club de Avellaneda and a number of football clubs in Italy. He was born in Rosario.

Barrera started his professional career in 1932 with Racing Club, he was twice the topscorer in the Argentine Primera, in 1934 with 34 goals and in 1936 with 32 goals. By the end of his time with Racing Club, Barrera had scored 136 goals in 142 games. He still holds the record as the club's highest scoring player.

In 1938 Barrera moved to Italy, he played for Lazio and Napoli in Serie A before dropping down into the lower leagues where he played for Ascoli.

During the war years he played for Novara and Gozzano in the Italian War Championships. After the end of the war he played for Cremonese and Mortara, retiring in 1948.

Barrera had a spell as manager of Novara between 1956 and 1958.
