= Antonio Alberino =

Argentine footballer

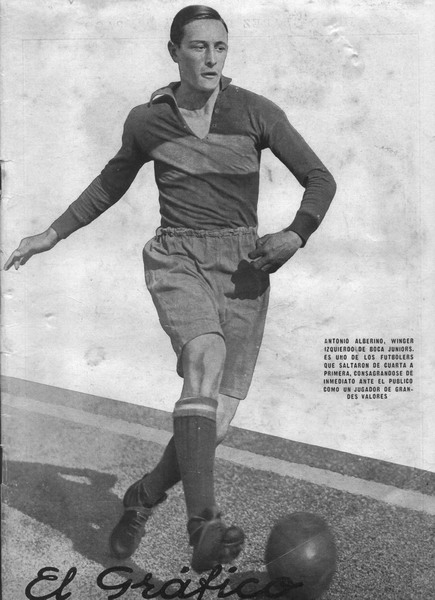
- Alberino playing for Boca Juniors in 1930

Personal information
- Full name: Antonio Américo Alberino
- Date of birth: October 26, 1910
- Place of birth: Argentina
- Date of death: August 13, 1991 (aged 80)
- Position: Striker

Senior career*
Years	Team	Apps	(Gls)
1929–1934	Boca Juniors	102	(26)
1934–1937	Tigre	41	(6)
1937–1942	All Boys	71	(19)
- * Club domestic league appearances and goals as of 23:08, 27 October 2010 (UTC)

Antonio Américo Alberino (26 October 1910 – 13 August 1991) was an Argentine football striker who won two league championships with Boca Juniors.

Alberino started his career in 1929 at the age of 18, he went on to play 107 matches in all competitions for the club and scored 28 goals. During his time with Boca Juniors the club won two league titles in 1930 and 1931. In 1934 he left Boca to join Club Atlético Tigre, he finished his career playing in the Argentine 2nd division with All Boys.

== Titles ==
Season	Team	Title
1930	Boca Juniors	Primera División Argentina
1931	Boca Juniors	Primera División Argentina
