= Ludovico Bidoglio =

Argentine footballer (1900–1970)

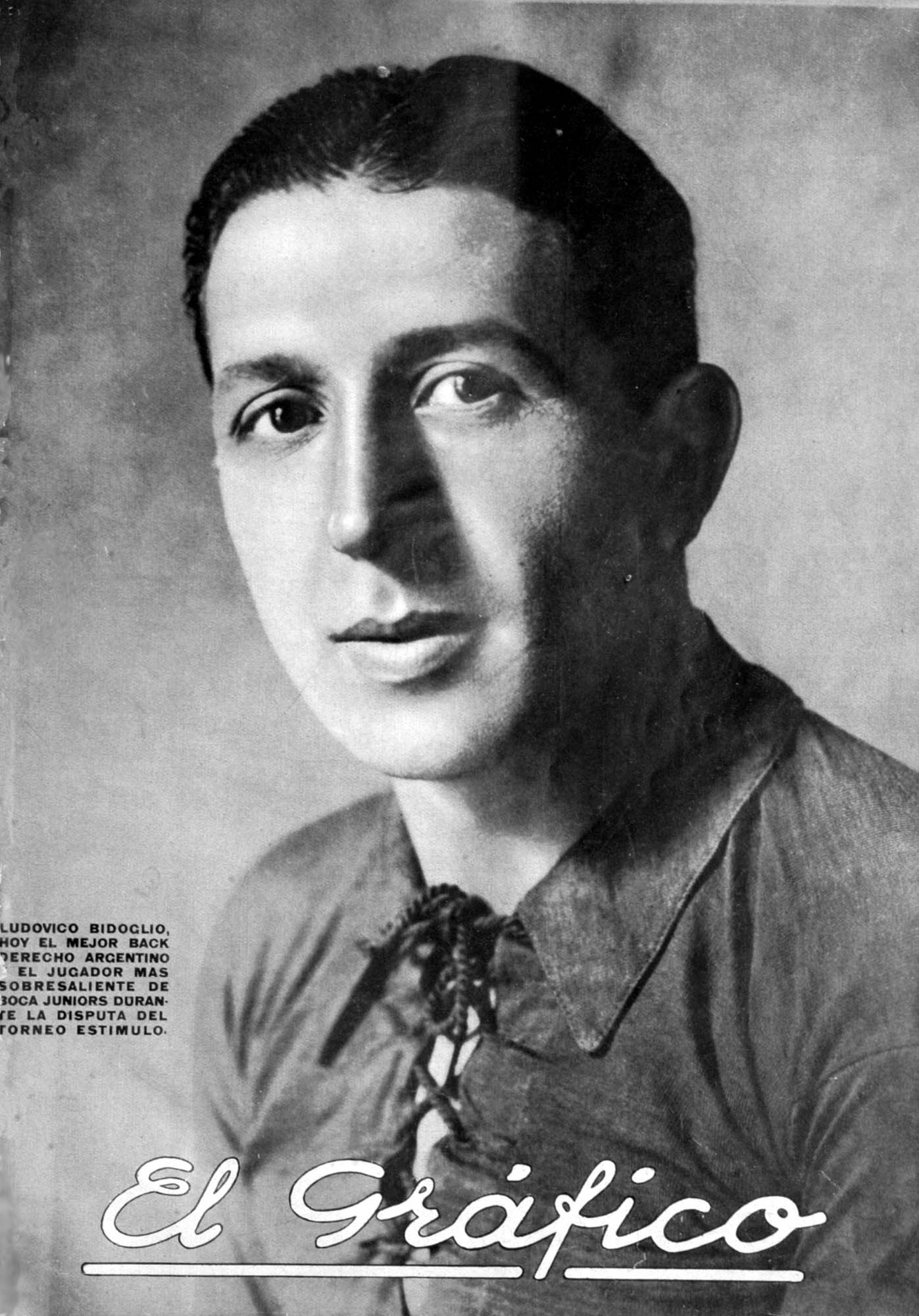
- Bidoglio covered on El Gráfico in 1930

Personal information
- Full name: Ludovico Bidoglio
- Date of birth: 5 February 1900
- Place of birth: Buenos Aires, Argentina
- Date of death: 25 December 1970 (aged 70)
- Position: Defender

Senior career*
Years	Team	Apps	(Gls)
1916–1917	Sportivo Palermo		
1918–1922	Eureka		
1923–1931	Boca Juniors	209	(1)

International career
1921–1928	Argentina	34	(0)

Managerial career
- 1933: Boca Juniors
Medal record
Representing Argentina
Men's football
Silver medal – second place	1928 Amsterdam	Team competition
- * Club domestic league appearances and goals

Ludovico Bidoglio, sometimes nicknamed Vico (5 February 1900 – 25 December 1970) was an Argentine football player, and one of Boca Juniors' idols during the 1920s. His position on the field was right back.

Due his elegant style, precise passing and marking, Bidoglio was regarded as one of the best defenders of his era, winning 10 titles with Boca Juniors. Bidoglio also played in the Argentina national team, where he won two South American Championships and a silver medal at the 1928 Summer Olympics.

== Career ==
Bidoglio made his debut with Sportivo Palermo in 1916, playing as right winger. During a match in which a fullback was injured, he had to take his place as a defender and from then on, Bidoglio would never play again in an attack position.

After playing for Eureka between 1918 and 1922, he made his debut with Boca Juniors in 1923, in a friendly match against Independiente. Due to his elegant style of game, much different from strong, hard and even rude defenders, Bidoglio caught the attention of the press and the fans, soon being recognized as one of the best defenders in Argentina at that time. His elegant style was the opposite to the thoughness and fierce marking of Ramón Muttis, the other back of the team by then.

With Boca Juniors, Bidoglio spent the most prolific years of his career, winning 10 titles with the club (5 League championships, 4 National cups and 1 international competition).

Bidoglio was first called up for Argentina in 1921, to play a friendly match v Paraguay. although his most notable match was v Uruguay in 1924, when he replaced Adolfo Celli, who had severely injured after trying to steal the ball to Pedro Cea. Bidoglio replaced Celli, becoming the first Argentine player to substitute another during a match. Bidoglio's last match with Argentina was the second final v Uruguay at the 1928 Olympics.

On the field, things make according to circumstances. The back has to move following the movements of the half (midfielder). When I had to mark the winger because Médice was taking the insider, (Ramón) Muttis covered me and (Alfredo) Elli covered Muttis... If defensive players do not receive collaboration from his teammates, they will be overcome by players of the opposite team. That's because Muttis and I never left centre half alone.

— Muttis talking about working as a team, in an interview for El Gráfico, 1934.

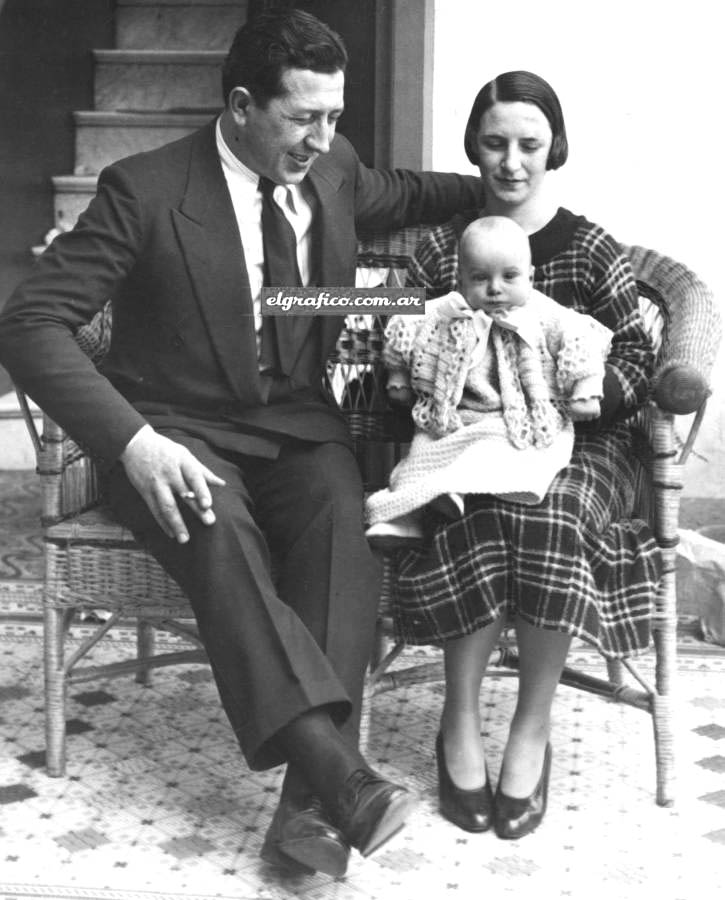
Bidoglio with his wife and son in 1934

Bidoglio's unexpected retirement from football was in 1931 during a match v Estudiantes de La Plata, where Bidoglio collided with Alberto Zozaya being seriously injured, therefore he had to leave the field. He would never return to play. Boca went on to win the 1931 championship, meaning that Bidoglio had helped the squad to win the 7th. league title for the club. After his retirement from football Bidoglio worked as an electrician until his death in 1970.

Having been in Europe during the Boca Juniors tour of 1925 and the 1928 Summer Olympics in Amsterdam, Bidoglio became nostalgic when speaking of those trips, as he stated in an interview with El Gráfico's journalist, "Borocotó", in 1934, three years after his retirement:

The best that football left on me were memories of trips. They are very nice, but also saddens me, to the point of saying myself "it would have better not to go", because memories bring me nostalgia of those trips. I'm sure that I won't travel to Europe anymore, and when I think of it I don't know if I could die satisfied for having seen that continent or I should be sad due to the fact I won't be there again. My head fills with memories of those trips and I feel bad at last. But on the other hand, life helps you. When I return home, see my son's smile and I realise how small is the world...

When his career as footballer ended, Bidoglio continued working as electrician in the Minister of Public Works of Argentina. He was also manager of Boca Juniors in 1933, coaching a team in the 1933 Primera División and Copa de Competencia Jockey Club for a total of 20 matches.

Bidoglio died in 1970.

== Honours ==
=== Club ===
Boca Juniors

- Primera División (5): 1923, 1924, 1926, 1930, 1931
- Copa Ibarguren (2): 1923, 1924
- Copa de Competencia Jockey Club (1): 1925
- Copa Estímulo (1): 1926
- Copa de Honor Cousenier (1): 1920

=== National team ===
Argentina

- Copa América (2): 1925, 1927
- Summer Olympics: (silver) 1928
