= Antonio Cerrotti =

Argentine footballer

Personal information
- Date of birth: 14 July 1901
- Date of death: 27 July 1979 (aged 78)
- Position: Forward

International career
| Years | Team | Apps | (Gls) |
| 1923–1925 | Argentina | 3 | (1) |

Antonio Cerrotti (14 July 1901 – 27 July 1979) was an Argentine footballer. He played in three matches for the Argentina national football team from 1923 to 1925. He was also part of Argentina's squad for the 1925 South American Championship.
