= Alfredo Garasini =

Argentine footballer and manager

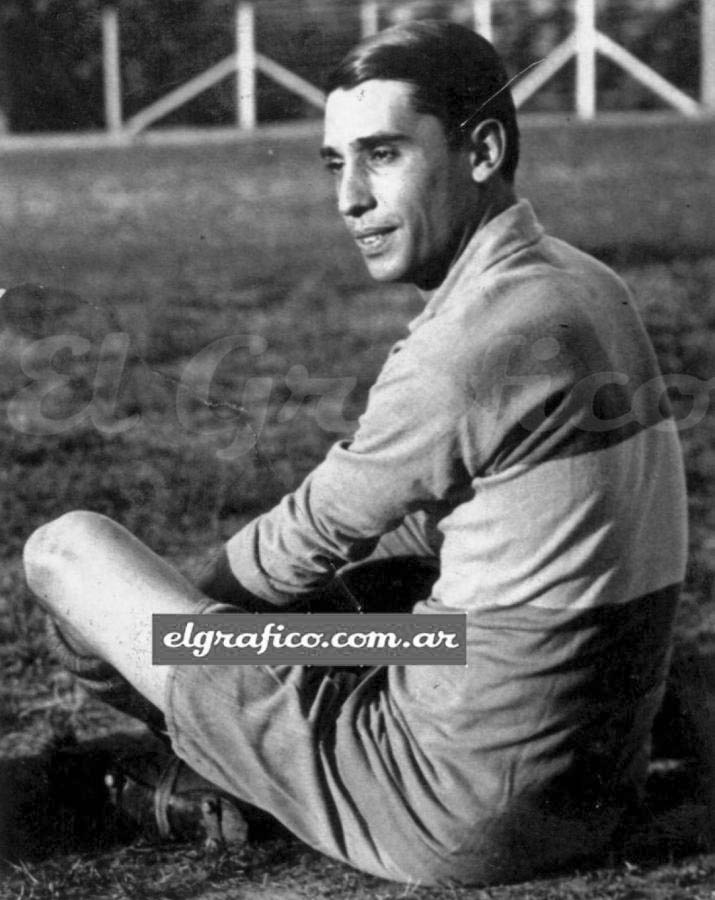

Personal information
- Date of birth: June 1, 1897
- Place of birth: Buenos Aires
- Date of death: January 29, 1950 (aged 52)
- Place of death: Santa Fe
- Position: Forward

Youth career
- ?: Boca Juniors

Senior career*
Years	Team	Apps	(Gls)
1916–20	Boca Juniors		
1920	River Plate		
1921	Sp. del Norte		
1921–28	Boca Juniors		
Total		160	(56)

International career
1924–25	Argentina	2	(1)
- * Club domestic league appearances and goals

Alfredo Garasini (Buenos Aires, June 1, 1897 – Santa Fe, January 6, 1950), was an Argentine footballer who played as forward.

Garasini spent most of his career at Boca Juniors, when he raised from the youth divisions. Garasini's performances in Boca Juniors were highlighted by both, fans and the media, winning a total of 13 titles with the club, 5 Primera División, 6 National cups and 2 international cups (organised by Argentine and Uruguayan Associations by then).

After retiring from football, Garasini served as coach, being also the Boca Juniors manager from 1943 to 1946, winning four titles else, the 1943 and 1944 league championships and two domestic cups, also achieving a mark of 23 consecutive matches unbeaten.

Garasini is considered one of the greatest idols in Boca Juniors history, being one of the eight persons in club's history that won titles as both, player and manager. with Rodolfo Arruabarrena as the last of them.

== Biography ==
Garasini raised from the youth divisions of Boca Juniors, being part of the roster that won four titles within a year (Primera División, Copa Competencia Jockey Club, Copa Ibarguren and international Tie Cup competition in 1919). He was also the topscorer of the 1919 season. Garasini played in every position on the field, debuting as centre-back, then playing as forward, midfielder, and even as goalkeeper when Américo Tesoriere injured. Garasini also served as masseur of the team.

In 1920 Garasini moved to Boca Juniors' arch-rival River Plate, where he stayed briefly, playing a Copa de Competencia Jockey Club match v. Atlanta in June 1920. The next year Garasini played for Sportivo del Norte, current "C.A. Colegiales", before returning to Boca Juniors where he played until his retirement in 1928.

During his second tenure on the Xeneize, Garasini was part of the team that made the successful tour on Europe in 1925. With Boca Juniors, Garasini totalized 160 games played with 56 goals scored.

With the Argentina national team Garasini played two games, v. Brazil in 1924 and Brazil in the 1925 South American Championship (where he scored a goal). Garasini won that championship with Argentina.

Alfredo Garasini died in 1950 in the city of Santa Fe where the team expected to play a friendly match facing local club Colón. Garasini was part of the coaching staff of Boca Juniors at the moment of his death.

== Titles as player ==
=== Club ===
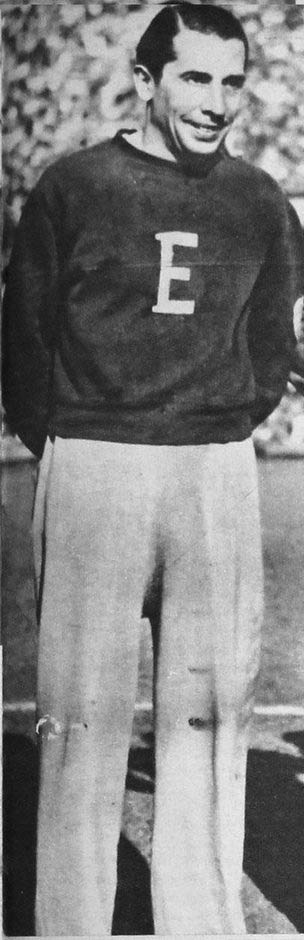
Garasini as coach of Boca Juniors, c. 1943–44

Boca Juniors

==== Domestic ====
- Primera División (5): 1919, 1920, 1923, 1924, 1926
- Copa de Competencia Jockey Club (2): 1919, 1925
- Copa Ibarguren (3): 1919, 1923, 1924
- Copa Estímulo (1): 1920

==== International ====
- Tie Cup (1): 1919
- Copa de Honor Cousenier (1): 1920

=== National team ===
Argentina

- Copa América (1): 1925

== Titles as manager ==
Boca Juniors

- Primera División (2): 1943, 1944
- Copa Escobar-Gerona (1): 1945
- Copa de Competencia Británica (1): 1946
