= The Tragedy of Gate 12 =

Stampede at River Plate Stadium in Buenos Aires, Argentina

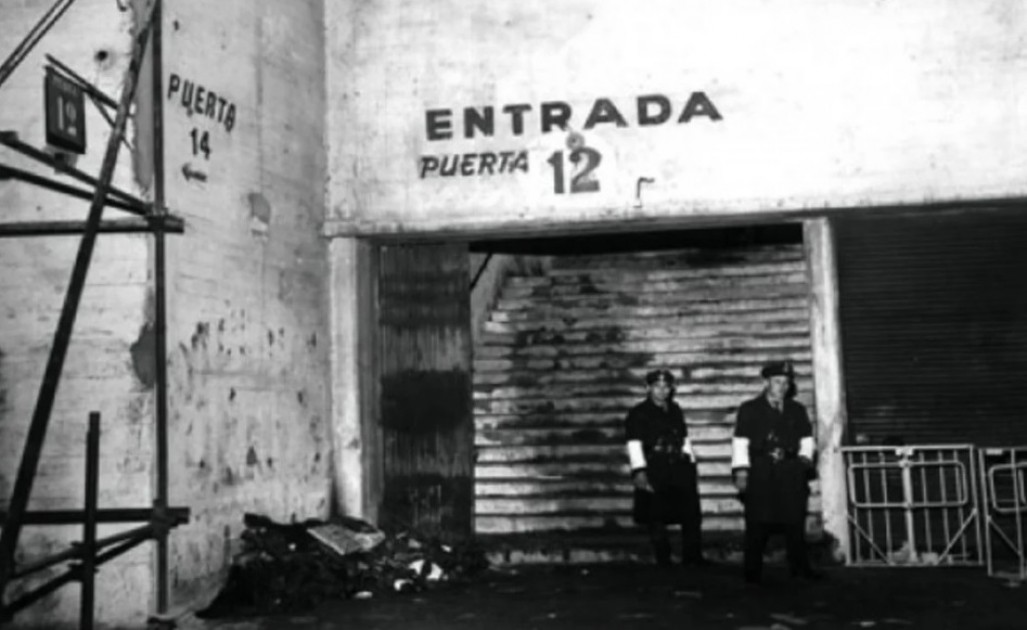
- "Gate 12" of Estadio Monumental guarded by the police the day after the tragedy
- Native name: La tragedia de la puerta 12
- Date: June 23, 1968; 58 years ago
- Venue: Estadio Monumental
- Location: Buenos Aires, Argentina
- Type: Death by asphyxia after a human stampede
- Cause: Exit door (#12) closed Police malpractice
- Motive: Unknown
- Target: Boca Juniors supporters
- Perpetrator: Unknown
- Organised by: C.A. River Plate; Federal Police
- Deaths: 71 (officially)
- Injuries: ~200

The Tragedy of Gate 12 (Spanish: La tragedia de la puerta 12) was a fatal human stampede that occurred on June 23, 1968, at the River Plate Stadium in Buenos Aires, Argentina. Over 70 people, all of them Boca Juniors fans with an average age of 19, were crushed to death, and more than 200 others were injured as they attempted to leave the stadium following a match between River Plate and their arch-rivals Boca Juniors. The official death toll was 71, although some witnesses suggested the number was closer to 200. This event is considered the worst disaster in Argentine sports history.

Despite strong suspicions of involvement by the Federal Police and Club Atlético River Plate, the causes and responsibility for the human stampede were never fully clarified.

For decades, the tragedy was treated as a taboo subject and was not officially acknowledged by either Boca Juniors or River Plate. It was not until 2008 that River Plate installed a plaque at the site—now Gate M—in memory of the victims. In 2018, on the 50th anniversary of the disaster, Boca Juniors apologized for having neglected the memory of the victims and committed to honoring them in the future.

In 2021, Boca Juniors installed a plaque listing the known victims in the main hall of La Bombonera and declared June 23 a day of mourning for the club.

== Events ==
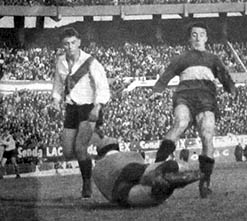
A moment of the match, that ended 0–0

The stampede occurred at the end of the football match between River Plate and Boca Juniors at River Plate Stadium, specifically at Gate 12, which served as an exit for visiting fans. An investigation by journalist Pablo Lisotto later clarified that the area leading to the street was not clear, and the pressure of the crowd exiting caused the fatalities.

The exact number of victims remains uncertain, but it is confirmed to exceed 70, with most victims being minors.

According to Lisotto, the likely cause was a police officer attempting to block the crowd's exit. His investigation concluded:

"I believe a police officer tried to block the exit after fans had already started evacuating the stadium. The gate was not locked—had it been, the pressure from the crowd would have forced it open. Behind the police blockade, there were mounted officers using batons, causing panic. Fans had to choose between being beaten or retreating to the stairs. This created an accordion effect in the human mass, leading to suffocation and crushing. The victims' bodies were unrecognizable to many family members due to the asphyxiation."

Lisotto compared the police actions to those of La Noche de los Bastones Largos (The Night of the Long Batons), emphasizing that the lack of photos, absence of autopsies, and subsequent silence were likely due to censorship by the government of Juan Carlos Onganía. Witnesses also claimed that Boca fans may have provoked police by singing the Peronist March, leading to the repression.

== Witness accounts ==
"At first, it was a normal stampede, but it intensified. I was carried through the air without touching the ground. Something went wrong—the avalanche stopped, and people started panicking. I passed out and was saved by others, probably because I was the youngest. I never returned to watch Boca play".

— Miguel Durrieu, a 14-year-old survivor

"Fans urinated in coffee cups and threw them at the mounted police, which led to the repression and tragedy".

— William Kent, former River president

"The mounted police acted against the crowd, causing the chaos. The gate was open, and the turnstiles were removed. I believe the authorities tried to cover up the police's role by blaming the turnstiles."

— Juan Carlos Tabanera, former municipal inspector

== Investigation and responsibility ==
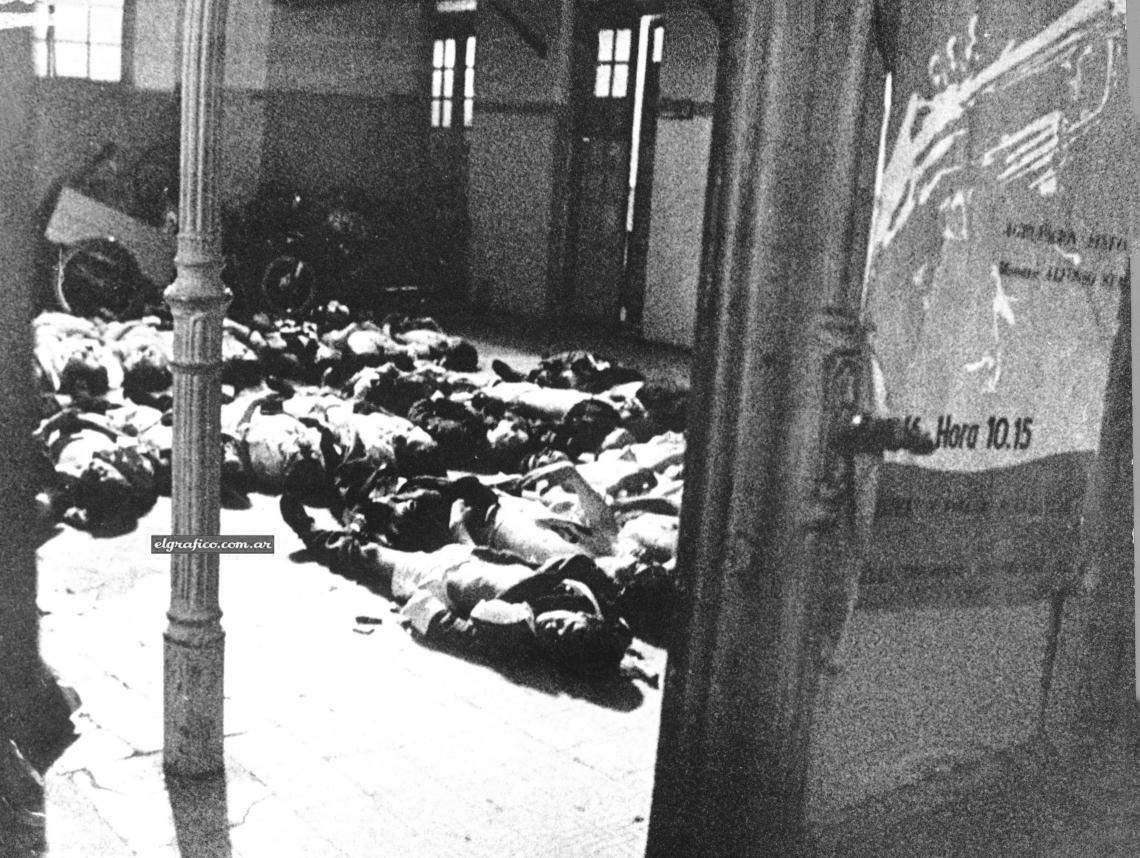
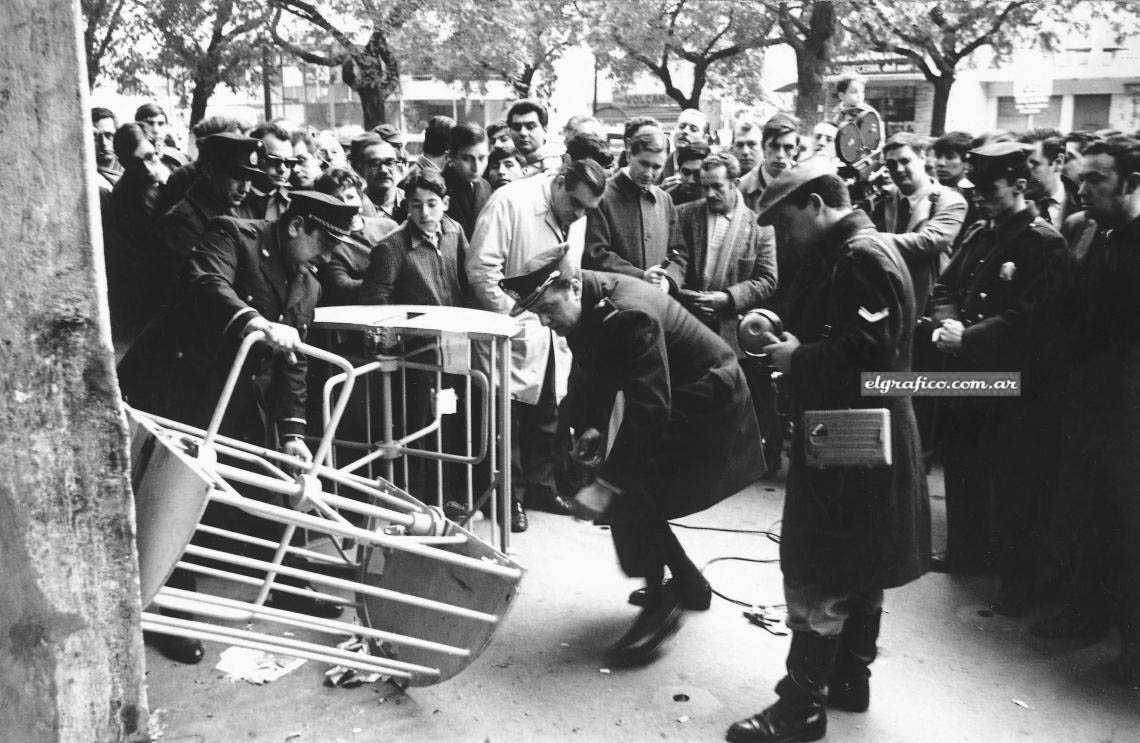
(Left): Dead bodies lying on the floor; (right): police officers revising the turnstiles

The criminal investigation concluded without identifying anyone responsible for the disaster. Many asserted that the exit was blocked by the Federal Police (at the time, the country was governed by the military dictatorship of the self-styled Revolución Argentina led by General Juan Carlos Onganía). Initially, two River Plate executives were prosecuted on charges of negligence, but following expert assessments and testimonies from fans themselves, the Court of Appeals declared them innocent.

Regarding civil liability, the Argentine Football Association (AFA) and the clubs collectively addressed the matter by creating a fund of just under $100,000, which amounted to slightly over $1,000 per victim. To receive this amount, the victims’ families were required to waive any further legal claims. Only two victims’ families, Nélida Oneto de Gianolli and Diógenes Zúgaro, pursued legal action against River Plate. The court ruled against the club due to its civil liability and ordered it to pay approximately $50,000 to each family.

The area where the tragedy occurred, the tunnel at Gate 12, was poorly lit. The combination of the low evening sun and a single small light bulb illuminating the entire tunnel made it very difficult to see the steps of the staircase. In the following years, false statements circulated claiming that the gate had been locked and/or that the turnstiles at the entrance had not been removed.

For decades, it was claimed that all the victims were Boca Juniors supporters. However, a journalistic investigation conducted by Pablo Lisotto in 2023 confirmed that at least three of the deceased were River Plate fans, and one was a Racing Club supporter.

== Later events ==
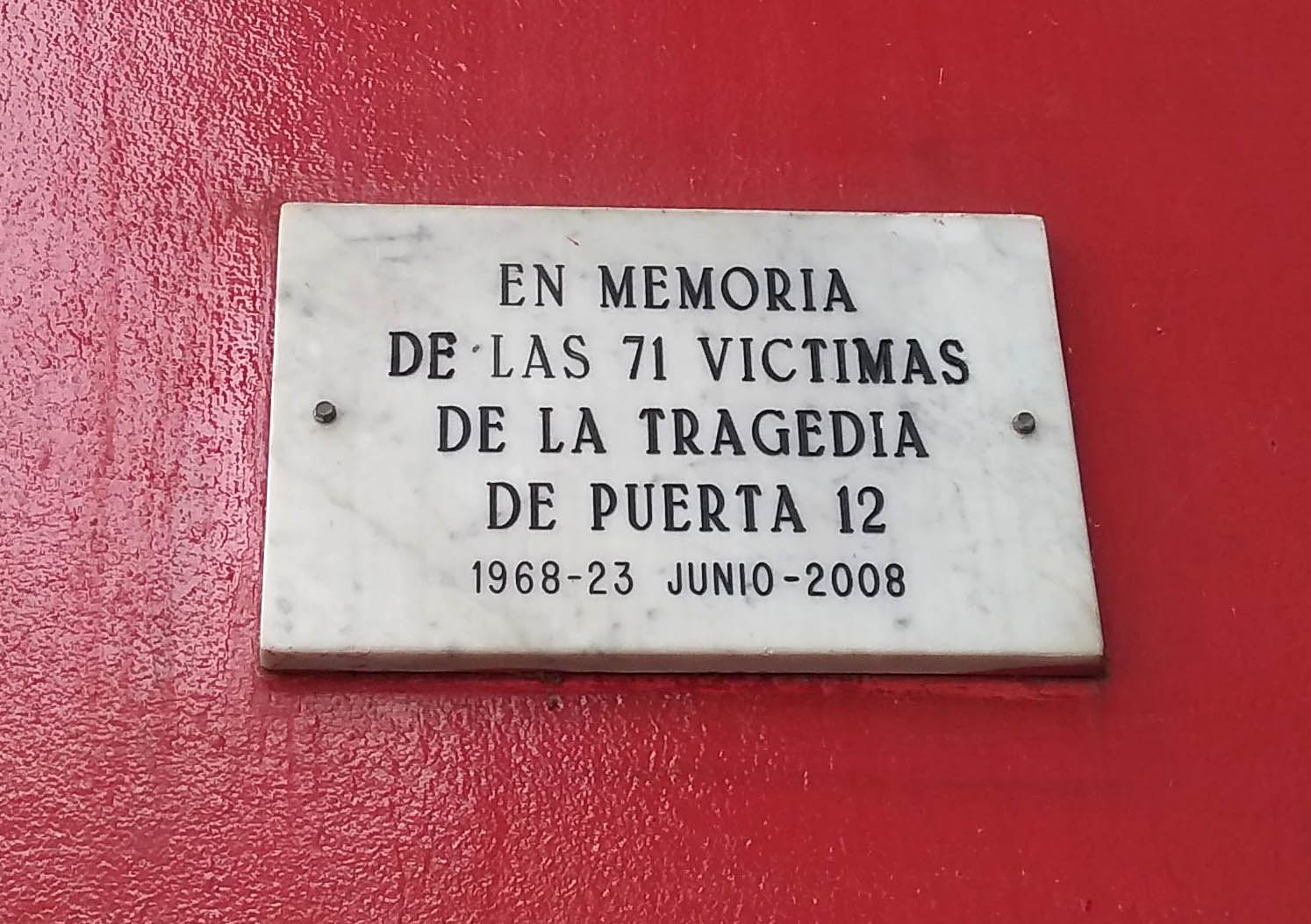
A plaque remembering the victims of "puerta 12" at River Plate Stadium

The affected gate, originally Gate 12, was later renamed Access L, then K, and is now Gate M. In 2008, River Plate installed a commemorative plaque. The same year, Pablo Tesoriere premiered his documentary Puerta 12, which reignited public remembrance of the tragedy.

Until 2008, there were no records of any act or tribute by Boca Juniors to honor those who died in the tragedy. The release of the documentary Puerta 12, directed by Pablo Tesoriere, marked the beginning of such remembrances. Since then, every mid-June during the Budget Assembly meeting, a moment of silence has been observed in memory of Puerta 12, mentioning "the 71 deceased."

In 2012, when the History Subcommittee began to operate formally, the club initiated deeper investigations into the incident with the goal of placing a commemorative plaque. Four years later, during a Board Assembly, Guillermo Dell’Oro proposed addressing the matter in a more institutional manner.

As secretary of the board and president of the History Subcommittee, Sergio Brignardello unified these proposals into a single objective. In 2017, a working and research group named Historia-Puerta 12, coordinated by Hernán Soria, was established.

In 2018, on the 50th anniversary of the tragedy, a tribute similar to that of 2008 was held during the Budget Assembly, where a commitment to create a commemorative plaque was officially announced. An event was also held at the club's museum, where the documentary was screened, with its director, Tesoriere, in attendance. During the event, Brignardello closed with a brief yet symbolic statement: "Apologies for the club's neglect." Around the same time, a message referencing the tragedy, signed by the then-president Daniel Angelici, appeared in the press.

The following year, the tribute was repeated, this time with the presence of Diana von Bernard, sister of one of the fans who lost their lives and a former employee of the club’s Youth Football Department. Additionally, with the support of Claudio Giardino, the group Boca es Pueblo created a mural commemorating the event at the corner of Palos and Aristóbulo del Valle, one of the main exits of La Bombonera toward Almirante Brown Avenue. Members and fans were invited to participate, and Diana herself painted her brother Guido’s name on the wall.

After the elections, in 2020, the new Board Assembly took over the initiative. Under the leadership of José Palazzo, the possibility of creating the plaque was revisited, with contributions from the History Subcommittee. Sergio Lodise, the subcommittee coordinator, and his team were responsible for its design and review.

Despite delays caused by the COVID-19 pandemic, in June 2021, President Jorge Amor Ameal finally inaugurated the long-awaited plaque, listing the names of the deceased known at that time. Simultaneously, the Assembly of Representatives declared June 23 as a Day of Mourning, during which the club's facilities remain closed.

In 2023, journalist Pablo Lisotto published Una tarde de junio (An Afternoon in June), the first in-depth investigation of the disaster.

== Virtual memorial chapel ==
On June 23, 2022, the creation of Puerta 12 Memoria was announced. This independent initiative has garnered the support of family and friends of the victims, as well as over 100 direct witnesses of the tragedy.

"Since 2018, we have been carrying out quiet and dedicated work, and we are excited about everything that lies ahead," states the initiative’s foundational document, which highlights its main goals:

- To keep the memory of those who died in Puerta 12 alive, along with honoring their families.
- To seek the truth about what happened at Puerta 12: the reasons, the methods, and who was responsible.
- To honor the deceased fans through various actions.
- To inform the media and journalism students, ensuring that historical inaccuracies about the event are no longer perpetuated.
- To bridge the divide that still exists between River and Boca fans regarding this tragedy.

The initiative calls on friends and family of the Puerta 12 victims, as well as anyone who experienced the event firsthand, to get in touch and help piece together the puzzle.
