= Delfín Benítez Cáceres =

Paraguayan footballer (1910–2004)

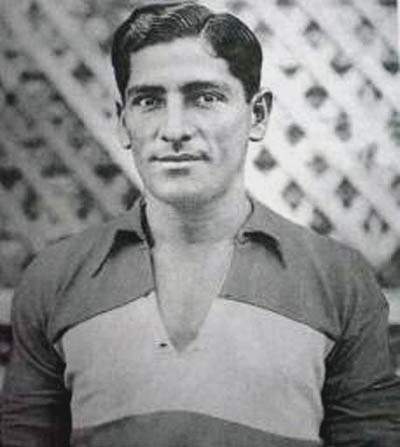
- Benítez Cáceres while playing for Boca Juniors

Personal information
- Full name: Delfín Benítez Cáceres
- Date of birth: 24 September 1910
- Place of birth: Asunción, Paraguay
- Date of death: 8 January 2004 (aged 93)
- Place of death: Caracas, Venezuela
- Height: 1.67 m (5 ft 5 1/2 in)
- Position: Striker

Senior career*
Years	Team	Apps	(Gls)
1930–1932	Libertad		
1932–1938	Boca Juniors	162	(108)
1939–1941	Racing Club	84	(65)
1942–1944	Ferro Carril Oeste	66	(20)
1944–1952	Sporting de Barranquilla		

International career
1929–1933	Paraguay	15	(3)
1934	Argentina	1	(1)
- * Club domestic league appearances and goals

Delfín Benítez Cáceres (24 September 1910 – 8 January 2004) was a Paraguayan football striker.

Benítez started his career in Libertad of his native country. As one of the key players of the Paraguay national football team in the early 1930s, he gained the attention of Argentinian club Boca Juniors and signed with them in 1932. He soon became one of the key players in the team and during the seven years he spent at the club he scored 107 goals in 162 matches, making him the fifth all-time top scorer in Boca Juniors' history . Boca fans consider Benítez as "perhaps the best foreign player to ever wear the blue and gold jersey of Boca Juniors" .

Near the end of his football career, Benítez also played for Argentinian sides Racing Club (1939–41) and Ferro Carril Oeste (1941–44). During his time at Racing he became the top scorer in the Primera División Argentina and in South American football for 1940 with 33 goals, tied with Isidro Lángara of San Lorenzo.

He earned 15 caps for Paraguay, including his participation at the 1929 South American Championship and both of the team's matches at the 1930 World Cup against the United States and Belgium; he scored three goals for Paraguay. Later, he appeared once for the Argentina national football team in 1934, scoring one goal.

After retiring from football as a player, he became a coach and led Independiente Medellín to a Colombian national championship in 1955. He also managed Sporting de Barranquilla, Boca Juniors de Cali and Millonarios. He also coached several Venezuelan football teams. He is the father of the footballer Delfín Edmundo Benítez.
