= 1940 Argentine Primera División =

49th season of top-tier football league in Argentina

Primera División
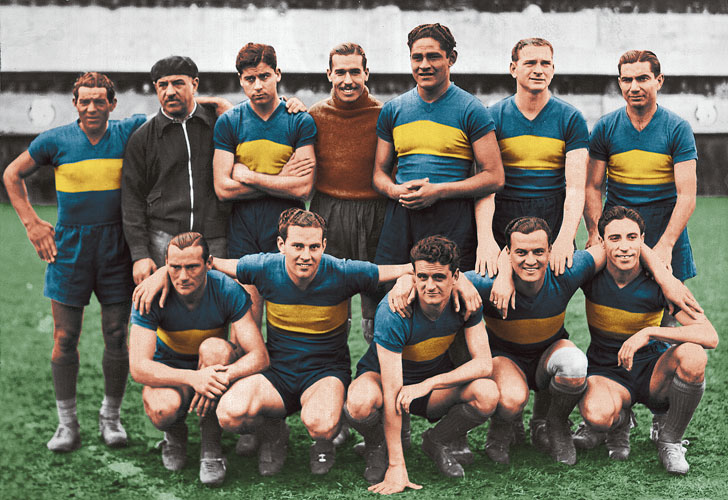
- Boca Juniors, champions
- Season: 1940
- Champions: Boca Juniors (10th title)
- Promoted: Banfield
- Relegated: Vélez Sársfield; Chacarita Juniors
- 1940 Copa Aldao: Boca Juniors
- Top goalscorer: (Paraguay) D. Benítez C. (Boca Juniors) (Spain) Isidro Lángara (S. Lorenzo) (33 goals each)

The 1940 Argentine Primera División was the 49th season of top-flight football in Argentina. The season began on April 7 and ended on December 22.

With 18 teams competing in the tournament, Boca Juniors achieved its 10th league title. Banfield returned to Primera while Vélez Sársfield and Chacarita Juniors were relegated.

== League standings ==
| Pos | Team | Pld | W | D | L | GF | GA | GD | Pts |
|---|---|---|---|---|---|---|---|---|---|
| 1 | Boca Juniors | 34 | 24 | 7 | 3 | 87 | 36 | +51 | 55 |
| 2 | Independiente | 34 | 20 | 7 | 7 | 90 | 49 | +41 | 47 |
| 3 | River Plate | 34 | 17 | 8 | 9 | 92 | 54 | +38 | 42 |
| 3 | Huracán | 34 | 19 | 4 | 11 | 80 | 62 | +18 | 42 |
| 5 | Racing | 34 | 18 | 5 | 11 | 84 | 67 | +17 | 41 |
| 6 | Estudiantes (LP) | 34 | 18 | 3 | 13 | 80 | 72 | +8 | 39 |
| 7 | Gimnasia y Esgrima (LP) | 34 | 17 | 4 | 13 | 77 | 86 | −9 | 38 |
| 8 | Newell's Old Boys | 34 | 14 | 9 | 11 | 70 | 61 | +9 | 37 |
| 9 | San Lorenzo | 34 | 11 | 8 | 15 | 62 | 65 | −3 | 30 |
| 10 | Banfield | 34 | 11 | 7 | 16 | 67 | 65 | +2 | 29 |
| 10 | Tigre | 34 | 13 | 3 | 18 | 75 | 86 | −11 | 29 |
| 10 | Platense | 34 | 12 | 5 | 17 | 51 | 68 | −17 | 29 |
| 13 | Rosario Central | 34 | 11 | 5 | 18 | 60 | 75 | −15 | 27 |
| 13 | Lanús | 34 | 12 | 3 | 19 | 75 | 97 | −22 | 27 |
| 13 | Ferro Carril Oeste | 34 | 10 | 7 | 17 | 58 | 76 | −18 | 27 |
| 16 | Atlanta | 34 | 11 | 4 | 19 | 58 | 87 | −29 | 26 |
| 17 | Vélez Sarsfield | 34 | 11 | 3 | 20 | 51 | 83 | −32 | 25 |
| 18 | Chacarita Juniors | 34 | 8 | 6 | 20 | 38 | 66 | −28 | 22 |

Source: rsssf.com
