= 1934 Argentine Primera División =

Primera División
- Season: 1934
- Dates: 18 March – 23 December
- Champions: Estudiantil Porteño (AFA); Boca Juniors (LAF)

The 1934 Primera División season was the 43rd season of the professional top-flight football in Argentina. This was also the last season of the Liga Argentina de Football which finally merged with the official Association.

Boca Juniors won the dissident professional LAF title, achieving its 8th league title, while Evaristo Barrera of Racing was the topscorer.

Estudiantil Porteño won the amateur AFA championship with Pedro Maseda and Domingo Tarasconi being both topscorers with 16 goals each. Because of the merging of both leagues at the end of the season, all the amateur AFA teams were relegated.

== Format and teams ==
The format for this season was a triple round-robin format, which was unique to this season. In order to accommodate the extra round, the number of teams was reduced from eighteen to fourteen. Six clubs were affected in the reduction of teams. Two clubs were relegated to a one-off Segunda División based on low ticket sales: Quilmes and Tigre. The remaining four clubs merged with another to form new entities which were allowed to participate this season: Talleres (BA) and Lanús merged to form Unión Talleres-Lanús; Atlanta and Argentinos Juniors merged to form Atlanta-Argentino Juniors. Atlanta-Argentinos Juniors lasted until Round 25, at which point it simply became Argentinos Juniors. Unión Talleres-Lanús lasted the entire season, but dissolved afterwards.

== Final tables ==
=== Asociación Argentina de Football ===
Note: All teams were relegated at the end of the season following the merger of LAF and AFA.

Primera División (AFA)
- Season: 1934
- Dates: 15 April – 28 October
- Champions: Estudiantil Porteño (2nd title)
- Relegated: (all teams) (Note: When the LAF merged to AFA, all those teams were relegated to second and third division, while Gutemberg and Liberal Argentino disaffiliated.)
- Top goalscorer: (Argentina) Pedro Maseda (Argentina) Domingo Tarasconi (16 goals each)
- Biggest home win: Gutemberg 7–0 Sp. Barracas; Nueva Chicago 7–0 Ramsar
- Biggest away win: Liberal Arg. 0–6 Estudiantes (BA)

Pos	Team	Pld	W	D	L	GF	GA	GD	Pts
1	Estudiantil Porteño	22	17	2	3	51	24	+27	36
2	Banfield	22	14	5	3	50	20	+30	33
3	Defensores de Belgrano	22	15	2	5	39	26	+13	32
4	Dock Sud	22	13	4	5	36	22	+14	30
5	El Porvenir	22	13	3	6	42	25	+17	29
6	General San Martín (Note: From San Martín, GBA.)	22	12	4	6	39	28	+11	28
7	Estudiantes (BA)	22	12	3	7	41	24	+17	27
8	Sportivo Alsina	22	11	3	8	42	37	+5	25
9	Excursionistas	22	10	3	9	41	35	+6	23
10	Acassuso	22	8	7	7	26	26	0	23
11	Argentino (Q)	22	8	5	9	51	37	+14	21
12	Almagro	22	8	5	9	32	30	+2	21
13	Colegiales	22	6	9	7	23	32	−9	21
14	Nueva Chicago	22	7	6	9	36	36	0	20
15	Argentino (T)	22	7	6	9	31	38	−7	20
16	All Boys	22	6	6	10	36	41	−5	18
17	Gutemberg (Note: From La Plata.)	22	7	3	12	36	44	−8	17
18	Barracas Central	22	7	3	12	37	49	−12	17
19	Sportivo Barracas	22	6	5	11	18	31	−13	17
20	Liberal Argentino	25	6	6	13	33	53	−20	18
21	Ramsar S.C. (Note: From Ramos Mejía.)	22	4	5	13	21	48	−27	13
22	Sportivo Buenos Aires	22	4	3	15	35	56	−21	11
23	Palermo	22	3	3	16	16	50	−34	9

=== Liga Argentina de Football ===
Primera División (LAF)
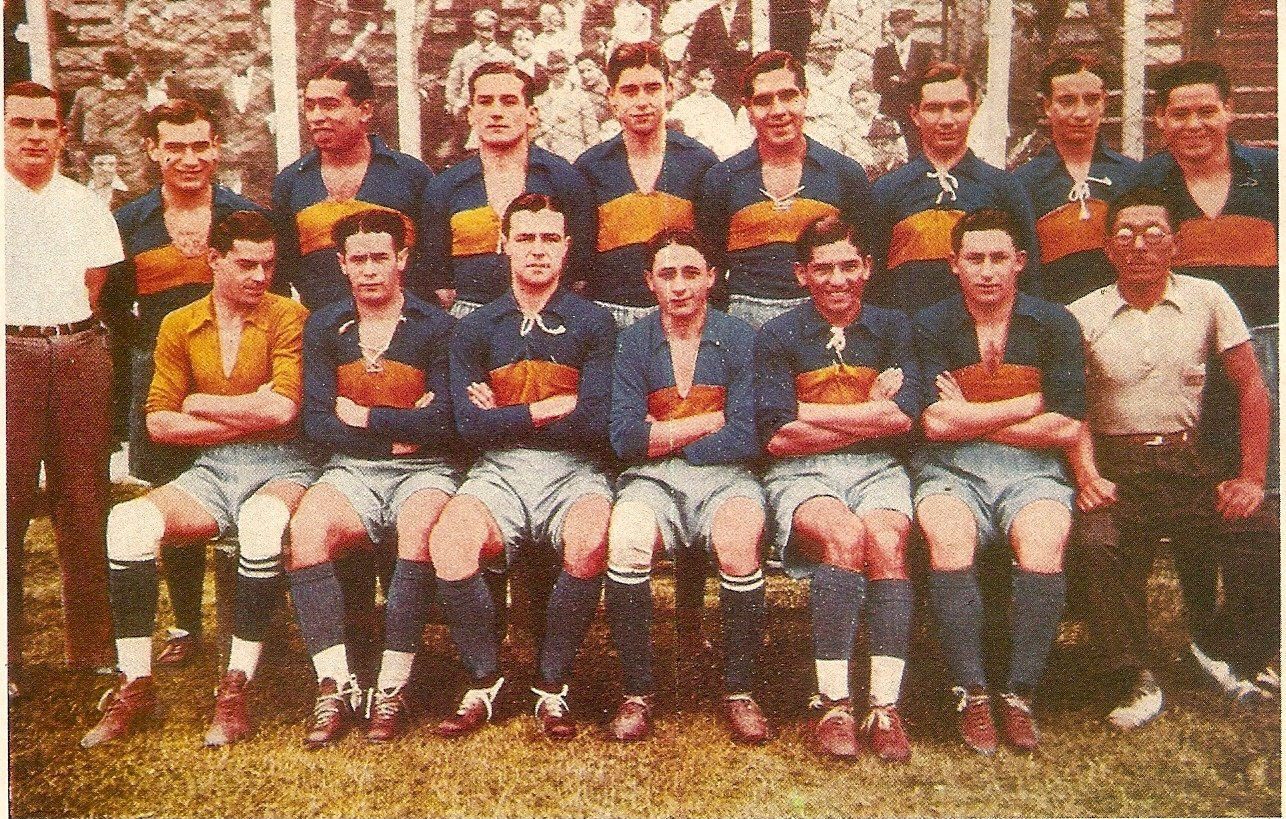
- Boca Juniors, LAF champions
- Season: 1934
- Dates: 18 March – 23 December
- Champions: Boca Juniors (8th title)
- Relegated: (none)
- Matches played: 273
- Goals scored: 995 (3.64 per match)
- Top goalscorer: (Argentina) Evaristo Barrera (34 goals)
- Biggest home win: River Plate 6–0 Ferro
- Biggest away win: Atlanta 1–8 Argentinos Jrs.
- Highest scoring: Gimnasia y Esgrima (LP) 8–2 Ferro

Pos	Team	Pld	W	D	L	GF	GA	GD	Pts
1	Boca Juniors	39	23	9	7	101	62	+39	55
2	Independiente	39	23	8	8	73	41	+32	54
3	San Lorenzo	39	22	7	10	84	63	+21	51
4	River Plate	39	23	4	12	91	44	+47	50
5	Estudiantes (LP)	39	17	10	12	70	56	+14	44
6	Racing	39	18	7	14	83	64	+19	43
7	Platense	39	16	11	12	70	74	−4	43
8	Vélez Sarsfield	39	16	9	14	80	70	+10	41
9	Gimnasia y Esgrima (LP)	39	14	10	15	82	86	−4	38
10	Huracán	39	14	9	16	59	67	−8	37
11	Chacarita Juniors	39	13	8	18	63	74	−11	34
12	Unión Talleres-Lanús	39	8	11	20	50	81	−31	27
13	Ferro Carril Oeste	39	6	8	25	51	100	−49	20
14	Argentinos Juniors	39	2	5	32	38	113	−75	9
