= 1935 Argentine Primera División =

44th season of top-tier football league in Argentina

Primera División
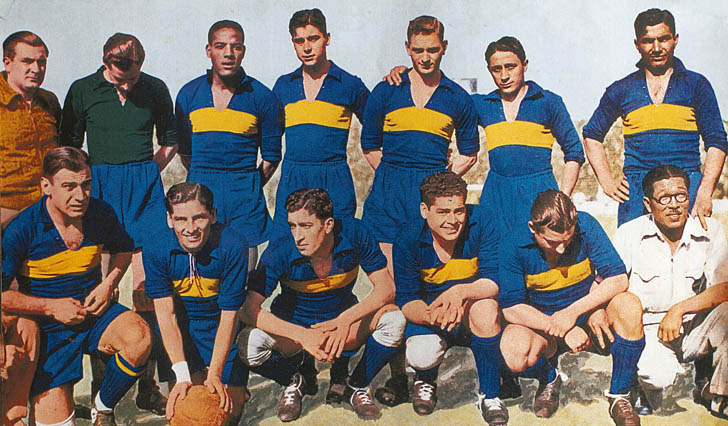
- Boca Juniors, champions
- Season: 1935
- Dates: 17 March – 22 December
- Champions: Boca Juniors (9th title)
- Relegated: (none)
- Top goalscorer: (Argentina) Agustín Cossio (Vélez Sarsfield)
- Biggest home win: Lanús 9-0 Quilmes
- Biggest away win: Tigre 3-9 Independiente

The 1935 Argentine Primera División was the 44th season of top-flight football in Argentina. There were 18 teams in the tournament, and Boca Juniors was the champion, winning its 9th league title.

== Standings ==
Pos	Team	Pld	W	D	L	GF	GA	GD	Pts
1	Boca Juniors	34	27	4	3	98	31	+67	58
2	Independiente	34	24	7	3	101	38	+63	55
3	San Lorenzo	34	23	3	8	92	45	+47	49
4	Vélez Sarsfield	34	19	8	7	77	46	+31	46
5	River Plate	34	19	6	9	71	47	+24	44
6	Huracán	34	16	7	11	59	38	+21	39
7	Estudiantes (LP)	34	14	9	11	78	52	+26	37
8	Ferro Carril Oeste	34	15	6	13	60	66	−6	36
9	Racing	34	13	5	16	55	58	−3	31
10	Talleres (RE)	34	11	8	15	60	70	−10	30
11	Lanús	34	13	4	17	56	79	−23	30
12	Platense	34	11	7	16	49	61	−12	29
13	Gimnasia y Esgrima (LP)	34	12	5	17	52	75	−23	29
14	Chacarita Juniors	34	10	6	18	49	57	−8	26
15	Atlanta	34	9	7	18	48	89	−41	25
16	Argentinos Juniors	34	7	6	21	42	89	−47	20
17	Quilmes	34	5	6	23	23	82	−59	16
18	Tigre	34	3	6	25	38	85	−47	12
