= List of Boca Juniors seasons =

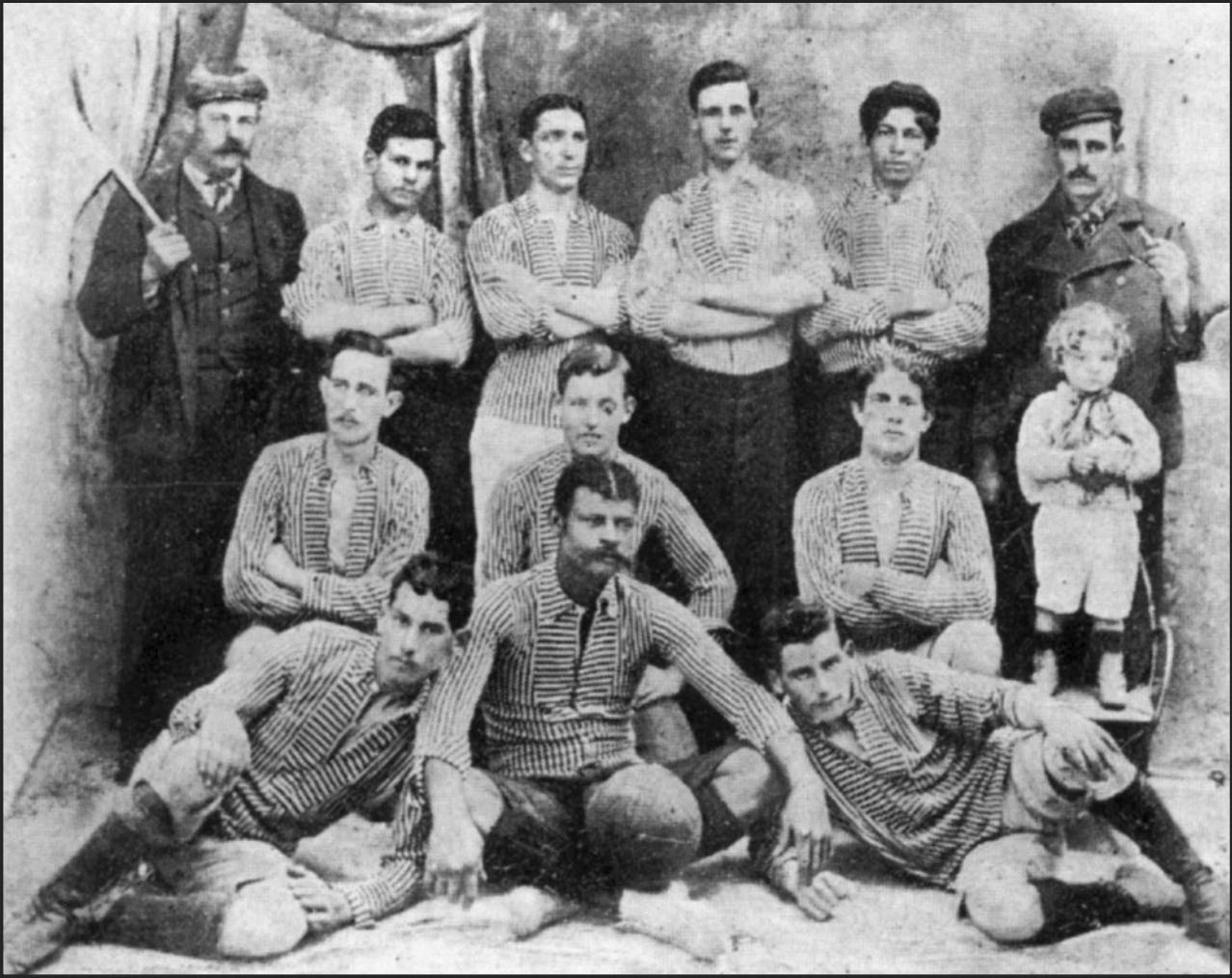
The first recorded photo of Boca Juniors taken in 1906, after winning the Copa Reformista of Liga Central

The following is a complete list of Club Atlético Boca Juniors seasons since 1908 to present. Competitions contested include domestic and international cups and tournaments.

On 3 April 1905, a group of Greek and Italian boys (more specifically from Genoa) met in order to find a club. The house where the meeting was arranged was Esteban Baglietto's and the other four people who attended were Alfredo Scarpatti, Santiago Sana and brothers Ioannis (Juan) and Theodoros (Teodoro) Farengas from Chios and Konstantinos Karoulias from Samos. Other important founders members include Arturo Penney, Marcelino Vergara, Luis Cerezo, Adolfo Taggio, Giovanelli, Donato Abbatángelo, Bertolini.

In 1925, Boca made its first trip to Europe to play in Spain, Germany and France. The squad played a total of 19 games, winning 15 of them. For that reason Boca was declared "Campeón de Honor" (Champion of Honour) for the 1925 season by the Association.

During successive years, Boca consolidated as one of the most popular teams of Argentina, with a huge number of fans not only in Argentina but worldwide. The club is one of the most successful teams in Argentine football, having won 35 Primera División titles, second only to River Plate with 38, and is the only team that has never been relegated to the second division.

== Key ==
Key to league record:

- Pos = Final position
- Pld = Played
- W = Games won
- D = Games drawn
- L = Games lost
- GF = Goals for
- GA = Goals against
- Pts = Points

Key to rounds:

- NCC = No Champion Crowned
- GS = Group stage
- R1 = First Round
- R2 = Second Round
- R3 = Third Round
- R4 = Fourth Round
- R64 = Round of 64
- R32 = Round of 32
- R16 = Round of 16
- QF = Quarter-finals
- SF = Semi-finals
- RU = Runners-up
- W = Winners
- DSQ = Disqualified

Key to tournaments:

- CB = Copa Bullrich
- CH = Copa de Honor
- CC = Copa de Competencia
- CCI = Copa Carlos Ibarguren
- CE = Copa Estímulo
- CBV = Copa Beccar Varela
- CAE = Copa Adrián Escobar
- CR = Campeonato de la República
- CCB = Copa de Competencia Británica
- CSu = Copa Suecia
- CA = Copa Argentina
- CCe = Copa Centenario
- SA = Supercopa Argentina
- CSA = Copa de la Superliga
- CLP = Copa de la Liga Profesional
- TC = Trofeo de Campeones de la Liga Profesional
- SI = Supercopa Internacional
- TC = Tie Cup
- CHC = Copa de Honor Cousenier
- CAl = Copa Aldao
- CEG = Copa Escobar-Gerona
- CL = Copa Libertadores
- IC = Intercontinental Cup
- CI = Copa Interamericana
- SS = Supercopa Sudamericana
- RS = Recopa Sudamericana
- CMS = Copa Master de Supercopa
- CO = Copa de Oro
- CIb = Copa Iberoamericana
- CM = Copa Mercosur
- CS = Copa Sudamericana
- CWC = FIFA Club World Cup

Champions	Runners-up	Third place

== Seasons ==
In 1908 the club affiliated the Argentine Football Association, playing in the Second Division and from 1913 to present days, Boca has participated in the Primera División, being the only club in Argentina to have played all seasons in the top division since it was promoted in 1912.

Boca has won 35 Primera División titles, 17 National cups, 18 CONMEBOL/FIFA titles and 4 AFA/AUF cups, achieving a total of 74 titles to date.

Boca Juniors also owns an honorary title awarded by the Argentine Football Association for their successful tour of Europe in 1925.

Season	League									National Cups		AFA/AUF CONMEBOL FIFA Cups		Top goalscorer(s)	
Season	Competition	Pos	Pld	W	D	L	GF	GA	Pts	National Cups		AFA/AUF CONMEBOL FIFA Cups		Name(s)	Goals
1908	Segunda División	SF	14	10	3	1	34	10	23	CB	R2	—		Rafael Pratt	22
1909	Segunda División	3rd	12	6	4	2	21	9	16	CB	R3	—		Alberto Penney	13
1910	Segunda División	2nd	21	15	3	3	64	20	3	CB	R1	—		Aquiles Giovanelli	13
1911	División Intermedia	5th	18	7	3	8	33	24	17	CB	R2	—		Francisco Taggino	15
1912	División Intermedia	3rd	12	7	2	3	23	9	16	CB	R1	—		Francisco Taggino	7
1913	Primera División	5th	14	8	2	4	29	16	18	CH	SF	—		Pedro Calomino	12
1913	Primera División	5th	14	8	2	4	29	16	18	CC	QF	—		Pedro Calomino	12
1914	Primera División	3rd	12	5	5	2	19	11	15	CC	QF	—		Enrique Bertolini	7
1915	Primera División	14th	24	8	6	10	32	38	22	CH	SF	—		Enrique Colla	14
1915	Primera División	14th	24	8	6	10	32	38	22	CC	R1	—		Enrique Colla	14
1916	Primera División	14th	21	7	6	8	25	29	20	CH	CF	—		Pedro Calomino	11
1916	Primera División	14th	21	7	6	8	25	29	20	CC	R1	—		Pedro Calomino	11
1917	Primera División	4th	20	10	8	2	42	23	28	CH	R1	—		Pedro Calomino	11
1917	Primera División	4th	20	10	8	2	42	23	28	CC	QF	—		Pedro Calomino	11
1918	Primera División	3rd	19	9	6	4	39	21	24	CH	QF	—		Alfredo Martín	12
1918	Primera División	3rd	19	9	6	4	39	21	24	CC	QF	—		Alfredo Martín	12
1919	Primera División	1st	8	8	0	0	27	5	16	CC	W	TC	W	Pedro Miranda	8
1919	Primera División	1st	8	8	0	0	27	5	16	CCI	W	CAl	RU	Pedro Miranda	8
1920	Primera División	1st	24	20	3	1	52	7	43	CH	RU	CHC	W	Pablo Bozzo	15
1920	Primera División	1st	24	20	3	1	52	7	43	CCI	RU	CAl	RU	Pablo Bozzo	15
1920	Primera División	1st	24	20	3	1	52	7	43	CE	GS	CAl	RU	Pablo Bozzo	15
1921	Primera División	3rd	18	10	5	3	30	17	25	CC	QF	—		Juan Pisa	10
1922	Primera División	3rd	16	10	2	4	30	19	22	—		—		Domingo Tarasconi	10
1923	Primera División	1st	34	26	4	4	92	21	56	CCI	W	—		Domingo Tarasconi	40
1924	Primera División	1st	19	18	1	0	67	8	37	CCI	W	—		Domingo Tarasconi	16
1925	Primera División	20th	7	6	1	0	13	3	13	CC	W	—		Domingo Tarasconi	15
1926	Primera División	1st	17	15	2	0	67	4	32	CE	W	—		Roberto Cherro	23
1927	Primera División	2nd	33	25	6	2	79	22	56	—		—		Domingo Tarasconi	35
1928	Primera División	2nd	33	25	6	2	79	22	56	—		—		Roberto Cherro	32
1929	Primera División	2nd	19	13	3	3	39	22	29	—		—		Mario Evaristo	9
1930	Primera División	1st	35	29	3	3	113	33	61	—		—		Roberto Cherro	37
1931	Primera División	1st	34	22	6	6	86	49	50	—		—		Francisco Varallo	27
1932	Primera División	4th	34	20	6	8	82	45	46	CC	R16	—		Francisco Varallo	26
1932	Primera División	4th	34	20	6	8	82	45	46	CBV	RU	—		Francisco Varallo	26
1933	Primera División	2nd	34	22	5	7	86	47	49	CC	QF	—		Francisco Varallo	45
1933	Primera División	2nd	34	22	5	7	86	47	49	CBV	SF	—		Francisco Varallo	45
1934	Primera División	1st	39	23	9	7	101	62	55	—		—		Roberto Cherro	22
1935	Primera División	1st	34	27	4	3	98	31	58	—		—		Delfín Benítez Cáceres	25
1936	Copa de Honor	3rd	17	10	4	3	36	17	24	—		—		Francisco Varallo	23
1936	Copa Campeonato	5th	17	9	2	6	39	19	20	—		—		Francisco Varallo	23
1937	Primera División	3rd	34	20	5	9	101	57	45	—		—		Francisco Varallo	22
1938	Primera División	5th	32	13	9	10	66	53	35	—		—		Delfín Benítez Cáceres	20
1939	Primera División	6th	34	17	6	11	64	40	40	CAE	SF	—		Francisco Varallo	10
1940	Primera División	1st	34	24	7	3	85	36	55	CCI	W	CAl	NCC	Jaime Sarlanga	25
1941	Primera División	4th	30	16	4	10	61	52	36	CAE	QF	—		Jaime Sarlanga	18
1942	Primera División	5th	30	14	7	9	65	41	35	CAE	SF	—		Jaime Sarlanga	11
1943	Primera División	1st	30	18	9	3	79	42	45	CAE	SF	—		Jaime Sarlanga	21
1943	Primera División	1st	30	18	9	3	79	42	45	CR	R1	—		Jaime Sarlanga	21
1944	Primera División	1st	30	19	8	3	82	41	46	CCI	W	—		Pío Corcuera	19
1944	Primera División	1st	30	19	8	3	82	41	46	CAE	SF	—		Pío Corcuera	19
1944	Primera División	1st	30	19	8	3	82	41	46	CR	QF	—		Pío Corcuera	19
1944	Primera División	1st	30	19	8	3	82	41	46	CCB	RU	—		Pío Corcuera	19
1945	Primera División	2nd	30	18	6	6	71	43	42	CR	RU	CEG	W	Jaime Sarlanga; Mario Boyé	22
1945	Primera División	2nd	30	18	6	6	71	43	42	CCB	RU	CEG	W	Jaime Sarlanga; Mario Boyé	22
1946	Primera División	2nd	30	19	4	7	68	38	42	CAE	QF	CEG	W	Mario Boyé	26
1946	Primera División	2nd	30	19	4	7	68	38	42	CCB	W	CEG	W	Mario Boyé	26
1947	Primera División	2nd	30	17	8	5	70	43	42	—		—		Mario Boyé	18
1948	Primera División	8th	30	10	10	10	70	52	47	CCB	QF	—		Mario Boyé	9
1949	Primera División	15th	34	10	7	17	52	58	27	—		—		Francisco Campana; Emilio Espinoza; Joaquín Martínez; Marcos Busico; Isaac Scliar	7
1950	Primera División	2nd	33	16	10	11	70	67	54	—		—		Juan José Ferraro	16
1951	Primera División	6th	32	11	13	8	46	38	35	—		—		Jorge Benítez	12
1952	Primera División	10th	30	11	8	11	50	39	30	—		—		Elio Montaño	13
1953	Primera División	7th	30	11	6	13	41	37	28	—		—		Roberto Rolando	9
1954	Primera División	1st	30	21	3	6	60	26	45	—		—		José Borello	19
1955	Primera División	3rd	30	14	9	7	51	36	37	—		—		Ernesto Cucchiaroni	10
1956	Primera División	3rd	30	16	8	6	56	39	40	—		—		Antonio Angelillo	14
1957	Primera División	4th	30	13	8	9	45	34	34	—		—		Juan José Rodríguez	8
1958	Primera División	2nd	32	15	10	7	76	53	40	CSu	GS	—		Angel Nardiello	21
1959	Primera División	8th	30	12	6	12	51	4	30	—		—		Angel Nardiello	16
1960	Primera División	5th	30	13	11	6	58	36	37	—		—		Paulo Valentim	11
1961	Primera División	5th	30	14	7	9	57	33	35	—		—		Paulo Valentim	24
1962	Primera División	1st	28	18	7	3	45	18	43	—		—		Paulo Valentim	19
1963	Primera División	4th	26	12	6	8	30	29	30	—		CL	RU	José Sanfilippo	14
1964	Primera División	1st	30	17	10	3	35	15	44	—		—		José Sanfilippo	14
1965	Primera División	1st	34	19	12	3	55	38	50	—		CL	SF	Alfredo Rojas	19
1966	Primera División	3rd	38	17	14	7	51	32	48	—		CL	SF	Alfredo Rojas	26
1967	Torneo Metropolitano	GS	22	8	10	4	29	20	26	—		—		Alfredo Rojas	11
1967	Torneo Nacional	7th	15	6	4	5	21	20	16	—		—		Alfredo Rojas	11
1968	Torneo Metropolitano	GS	22	5	13	4	15	17	23	—		—		Rubén Suñé	7
1968	Torneo Nacional	5th	15	8	5	2	25	7	21	—		—		Rubén Suñé	7
1969	Torneo Metropolitano	SF	23	12	7	4	34	11	31	CA	W	—		Ángel Rojas	14
1969	Torneo Nacional	1st	17	13	3	1	35	11	29	CA	W	—		Ángel Rojas	14
1970	Torneo Metropolitano	4th	20	10	5	5	30	19	25	—		CL	SF	Jorge Coch	13
1970	Torneo Nacional	1st	22	15	3	4	40	21	33	—		CL	SF	Jorge Coch	13
1971	Torneo Metropolitano	8th	36	16	4	16	59	52	36	—		CL	GS	Osvaldo Potente	12
1971	Torneo Nacional	GS	14	8	4	2	33	17	20	—		CL	GS	Osvaldo Potente	12
1972	Torneo Metropolitano	9th	34	12	12	10	56	44	36	—		—		Hugo Curioni	29
1972	Torneo Nacional	SF	14	10	2	2	33	18	22	—		—		Hugo Curioni	29
1973	Torneo Metropolitano	2nd	32	18	6	8	69	37	42	—		—		Osvaldo Potente	24
1973	Torneo Nacional	GS	15	9	0	6	30	19	18	—		—		Osvaldo Potente	24
1974	Torneo Metropolitano	3rd	22	12	3	7	43	26	27	—		—		Osvaldo Potente	20
1974	Torneo Nacional	7th	17	17	2	6	56	21	36	—		—		Osvaldo Potente	20
1975	Torneo Metropolitano	3rd	38	22	6	10	80	40	50	—		—		Marcelo Trobbiani	15
1975	Torneo Nacional	GS	16	8	0	8	39	31	16	—		—		Marcelo Trobbiani	15
1976	Torneo Metropolitano	1st	33	17	10	6	48	30	44	—		—		Darío Felman	14
1976	Torneo Nacional	1st	20	14	3	3	30	12	31	—		—		Darío Felman	14
1977	Torneo Metropolitano	4th	44	22	9	13	67	45	53	—		CL	W	Ernesto Mastrángelo	19
1977	Torneo Nacional	GS	14	7	3	4	22	16	17	—		IC	W	Ernesto Mastrángelo	19
1978	Torneo Metropolitano	2nd	40	20	13	7	67	58	45	—		CL	W	Ernesto Mastrángelo	12
1978	Torneo Nacional	GS	14	7	1	6	19	25	15	—		CI	RU	Ernesto Mastrángelo	12
1979	Torneo Metropolitano	GS	18	7	6	5	27	19	20	—		CL	RU	Ernesto Mastrángelo	11
1979	Torneo Nacional	GS	14	5	7	2	15	1	17	—		CL	RU	Ernesto Mastrángelo	11
1980	Torneo Metropolitano	7th	36	12	14	10	43	47	38	—		—		Jorge Ribolzi	13
1980	Torneo Nacional	GS	14	4	4	6	17	22	12	—		—		Jorge Ribolzi	13
1981	Torneo Metropolitano	1st	34	20	10	4	60	27	50	—		—		Diego Maradona	28
1981	Torneo Nacional	QF	16	9	3	4	31	16	21	—		—		Diego Maradona	28
1982	Torneo Nacional	GS	16	6	7	3	26	18	19	—		CL	GS	Ricardo Gareca	26
1982	Torneo Metropolitano	3rd	36	17	14	5	60	36	48	—		CL	GS	Ricardo Gareca	26
1983	Torneo Nacional	R16	14	7	3	4	23	13	17	—		—		Ricardo Gareca	22
1983	Torneo Metropolitano	7th	36	14	9	13	57	61	37	—		—		Ricardo Gareca	22
1984	Torneo Nacional	GS	6	2	3	1	7	5	7	—		—		Ricardo Gareca; Ariel Krasouski; Marcelo Stocco	5
1984	Torneo Metropolitano	16th	36	10	10	16	34	49	30	—		—		Ricardo Gareca; Ariel Krasouski; Marcelo Stocco	5
1985	Torneo Nacional	R4	10	5	2	3	19	12	12	—		—		José Luis Brown; Alfredo Graciani	4
1985–86	Primera División	5th	44	19	15	10	71	56	53	—		CL	GS	Carlos Tapia	17
1986–87	Primera División	4th	44	21	12	11	77	59	54	—		—		Jorge Comas	23
1987–88	Primera División	12th	44	17	14	16	59	65	48	—		SS	R16	Jorge Comas	18
1988–89	Primera División	2nd	47	22	14	11	63	48	58	—		CL	R16	Jorge Comas	22
1989–90	Primera División	3rd	42	14	22	6	53	36	50	—		SS	W	Alfredo Graciani	10
1989–90	Primera División	3rd	42	14	22	6	53	36	50	—		RS	W	Alfredo Graciani	10
1990–91	Primera División	2nd	46	21	15	10	54	26	58	—		SS	QF	Gabriel Batistuta	19
1990–91	Primera División	2nd	46	21	15	10	54	26	58	—		CL	SF	Gabriel Batistuta	19
1991–92	Apertura Tournament	2nd	19	7	10	2	22	15	24	—		SS	R16	Diego Latorre	12
1991–92	Clausura Tournament	4th	21	11	6	4	22	12	26	—		CMS	W	Diego Latorre	12
1992–93	Apertura Tournament	1st	19	10	7	2	24	11	27	—		SS	R16	Sergio Martínez	20
1992–93	Clausura Tournament	7th	19	6	9	4	23	18	21	—		CO	W	Sergio Martínez	20
1993–94	Apertura Tournament	4th	19	8	6	5	25	12	22	CCe	R4	SS	R16	Sergio Martínez	22
1993–94	Clausura Tournament	7th	19	6	8	5	25	19	20	CCe	R4	CL	GS	Sergio Martínez	22
1993–94	Clausura Tournament	7th	19	6	8	5	25	19	20	CCe	R4	CIb	RU	Sergio Martínez	22
1994–95	Apertura Tournament	13th	19	5	7	7	29	28	17	—		SS	RU	Sergio Martínez	18
1994–95	Clausura Tournament	4th	19	9	6	4	33	19	24	—		SS	RU	Sergio Martínez	18
1995–96	Apertura Tournament	4th	19	9	8	2	23	16	36	—		SS	GS	Claudio Caniggia	12
1995–96	Clausura Tournament	5th	19	10	3	6	30	26	33	—		SS	GS	Claudio Caniggia	12
1996–97	Apertura Tournament	10th	19	7	4	8	36	33	25	—		SS	QF	Sergio Martínez	17
1996–97	Clausura Tournament	9th	19	6	7	6	34	32	25	—		SS	QF	Sergio Martínez	17
1997–98	Apertura Tournament	2nd	19	13	5	1	35	12	44	—		SS	GS	Martín Palermo	21
1997–98	Clausura Tournament	6th	19	8	5	6	38	30	29	—		SS	GS	Martín Palermo	21
1998–99	Apertura Tournament	1st	19	13	6	0	45	18	44	—		CM	QF	Martín Palermo	35
1998–99	Clausura Tournament	1st	19	13	5	1	35	11	44	—		CM	QF	Martín Palermo	35
1999–2000	Apertura Tournament	3rd	19	12	5	2	36	15	41	—		CM	GS	Martín Palermo	21
1999–2000	Clausura Tournament	7th	19	10	6	3	38	17	33	—		CL	W	Martín Palermo	21
2000–01	Apertura Tournament	1st	19	12	5	2	35	19	41	—		CM	QF	Martín Palermo	14
2000–01	Apertura Tournament	1st	19	12	5	2	35	19	41	—		IC	W	Martín Palermo	14
2000–01	Clausura Tournament	3rd	19	8	6	5	29	26	30	—		CL	W	Martín Palermo	14
2001–02	Apertura Tournament	3rd	19	9	6	4	41	27	33	—		CM	GS	Juan Román Riquelme; Guillermo Barros Schelotto	10
2001–02	Apertura Tournament	3rd	19	9	6	4	41	27	33	—		IC	RU	Juan Román Riquelme; Guillermo Barros Schelotto	10
2001–02	Clausura Tournament	3rd	19	10	5	4	25	17	35	—		CL	QF	Juan Román Riquelme; Guillermo Barros Schelotto	10
2002–03	Apertura Tournament	2nd	19	12	4	3	32	15	40	—		CS	R16	Marcelo Delgado	18
2002–03	Clausura Tournament	2nd	19	12	3	4	36	23	39	—		CL	W	Marcelo Delgado	18
2003–04	Apertura Tournament	1st	19	11	6	2	31	11	39	—		CS	QF	Carlos Tevez	15
2003–04	Apertura Tournament	1st	19	11	6	2	31	11	39	—		IC	W	Carlos Tevez	15
2003–04	Clausura Tournament	2nd	19	10	6	3	34	17	36	—		CL	RU	Carlos Tevez	15
2004–05	Apertura Tournament	8th	19	7	5	7	22	17	26	—		CS	W	Martín Palermo	21
2004–05	Apertura Tournament	8th	19	7	5	7	22	17	26	—		RS	RU	Martín Palermo	21
2004–05	Clausura Tournament	15th	19	6	4	9	26	30	22	—		CL	QF	Martín Palermo	21
2005–06	Apertura Tournament	1st	19	12	4	3	36	17	40	—		RS	W	Martín Palermo; Rodrigo Palacio	22
2005–06	Clausura Tournament	1st	19	13	4	2	37	12	43	—		CS	W	Martín Palermo; Rodrigo Palacio	22
2006–07	Apertura Tournament	2nd	20	14	3	4	42	19	44	—		CS	R16	Rodrigo Palacio	28
2006–07	Apertura Tournament	2nd	20	14	3	4	42	19	44	—		RS	W	Rodrigo Palacio	28
2006–07	Clausura Tournament	2nd	19	11	6	2	38	20	39	—		CL	W	Rodrigo Palacio	28
2007–08	Apertura Tournament	4th	19	9	4	6	32	18	31	—		CS	R16	Martín Palermo	32
2007–08	Apertura Tournament	4th	19	9	4	6	32	18	31	—		CWC	RU	Martín Palermo	32
2007–08	Clausura Tournament	2nd	19	11	6	2	33	15	39	—		CL	SF	Martín Palermo	32
2008–09	Apertura Tournament	1st	21	13	3	5	36	23	42	—		CS	QF	Martín Palermo	13
2008–09	Clausura Tournament	14th	19	6	4	5	22	29	22	—		RS	W	Martín Palermo	13
2008–09	Clausura Tournament	14th	19	6	4	5	22	29	22	—		CL	R16	Martín Palermo	13
2009–10	Apertura Tournament	11th	19	7	6	6	28	24	27	—		CS	R1	Martín Palermo	16
2009–10	Clausura Tournament	16th	19	5	5	9	28	35	20	—		CS	R1	Martín Palermo	16
2010–11	Apertura Tournament	12th	19	7	4	8	20	20	25	—		—		Martín Palermo	14
2010–11	Clausura Tournament	7th	19	7	7	5	24	22	28	—		—		Martín Palermo	14
2011–12	Apertura Tournament	1st	19	12	7	0	25	6	43	CA	W	CL	RU	Pablo Mouche	11
2011–12	Clausura Tournament	4th	19	9	6	4	30	20	33	CA	W	CL	RU	Pablo Mouche	11
2012–13	Inicial Tournament	6th	19	9	6	4	25	20	33	SA	RU	CS	R2	Santiago Silva	13
2012–13	Final Tournament	19th	19	3	9	7	13	29	18	CA	R16	CL	QF	Santiago Silva	13
2013–14	Inicial Tournament	7th	19	8	5	6	25	24	29	—		—		Emmanuel Gigliotti	16
2013–14	Final Tournament	2nd	19	9	5	5	25	15	32	—		—		Emmanuel Gigliotti	16
2014	Primera División	5th	19	9	4	6	25	23	31	CA	R32	CS	SF	Jonathan Calleri	8
2015	Primera Division	1st	30	20	4	6	49	26	64	CA	W	CL	DSQ	Jonathan Calleri	15
2015	Copa Libertadores playoff	—	1	1	0	0	1	0	—	CA	W	CL	DSQ	Jonathan Calleri	15
2016	Primera División	17th	16	5	5	6	15	13	31	SA	RU	CL	SF	Carlos Tevez	9
2016–17	Primera División	1st	30	18	9	3	62	25	63	CA	QF	—		Darío Benedetto	23
2017–18	Superliga Argentina	1st	27	18	4	5	50	22	58	CA	R16	CL	GS	Darío Benedetto	12
2017–18	Superliga Argentina	1st	27	18	4	5	50	22	58	SA	RU	CL	GS	Darío Benedetto	12
2018–19	Superliga Argentina	3rd	25	15	6	4	42	18	51	CA	R16	CL	RU	Mauro Zárate	15
2018–19	Superliga Argentina	3rd	25	15	6	4	42	18	51	SA	W	CL	RU	Mauro Zárate	15
2018–19	Superliga Argentina	3rd	25	15	6	4	42	18	51	CA	R64	CL	GS	Mauro Zárate	15
2018–19	Superliga Argentina	3rd	25	15	6	4	42	18	51	CSA	RU	CL	GS	Mauro Zárate	15
2019–20	Superliga Argentina	1st	23	14	6	3	35	8	48	CA	R32	CL	SF	Eduardo Salvio	10
2019–20	Superliga Argentina	1st	23	14	6	3	35	8	48	CSA	GS	CL	GS	Eduardo Salvio	10
2020–21	—	—	—	—	—	—	—	—	—	CA	R16	CL	SF	Sebastián Villa	10
2020–21	—	—	—	—	—	—	—	—	—	CLP	W	CL	GS	Sebastián Villa	10
2020–21	—	—	—	—	—	—	—	—	—	CLP	SF	CL	GS	Sebastián Villa	10
2021	Liga Profesional	4th	25	11	8	6	35	19	41	CA	W	CL	R16	Luis Vázquez	8
2022	Liga Profesional	1st	27	16	4	7	34	28	52	CA	SF	CL	R16	Darío Benedetto	16
2022	Liga Profesional	1st	27	16	4	7	34	28	52	CLP	W	CL	R16	Darío Benedetto	16
2022	Liga Profesional	1st	27	16	4	7	34	28	52	TC	RU	CL	R16	Darío Benedetto	16
2023	Liga Profesional	7th	27	13	5	9	33	24	44	CA	SF	CL	RU	Miguel Merentiel	18
2023	Liga Profesional	7th	27	13	5	9	33	24	44	CLP	GS	CL	RU	Miguel Merentiel	18
2023	Liga Profesional	7th	27	13	5	9	33	24	44	SA	W	CL	RU	Miguel Merentiel	18
2023	Liga Profesional	7th	27	13	5	9	33	24	44	SI	RU	CL	RU	Miguel Merentiel	18
2024	Liga Profesional	6th	27	11	9	7	30	23	42	CA	SF	CS	R16	Edinson Cavani	20
2024	Liga Profesional	6th	27	11	9	7	30	23	42	CLP	SF	CS	R16	Edinson Cavani	20
2025	Apertura Tournament	QF	18	10	4	4	24	12	34	CA	R32	CL	R2	Miguel Merentiel	15
2025	Clausura Tournament	SF	19	10	5	4	31	13	35	CA	R32	CWC	GS	Miguel Merentiel	15
2025	Aggregate table	2nd	32	18	8	6	52	23	62	CA	R32	CWC	GS	Miguel Merentiel	15
2026	Apertura Tournament	R16	17	8	6	3	24	12	30	CA	R64	CL	GS		
2026	Clausura Tournament	—	—	—	—	—	—	—	—	CA	R64	CS	W		
2026	Aggregate table	1st	32	17	12	3	46	23	63	CA	R64	CS	W		
Season	Competition	Pos	Pld	W	D	L	GF	GA	Pts	National Cups		AFA/AUF CONMEBOL FIFA Cups		Name(s)	Goals
Season	League									National Cups		AFA/AUF CONMEBOL FIFA Cups		Top goalscorer(s)	

== See also ==
- History of Boca Juniors
