= Boca Juniors top scorers =

This article includes statistics of Boca Juniors all-time top goal scorers.

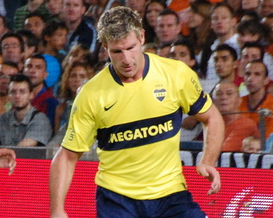
Boca Juniors all time goal scorer Martín Palermo

Martín Palermo is Boca Juniors all time goal scorer with 236 goals, 193 of those goals were scored in Argentine Primera División tournaments and the other 43 in International tournaments.

Palermo is also the club's top international scorer with 43 goals, followed by Rodrigo Palacio with 28.

== All time top scorers ==
=== All official tournaments ===
Top 20 scorers of all time (all competitions)
| # | Years | Scorers | Matches | Goals |
|---|---|---|---|---|
| 1 | 1997–00, 2004–11 | Martín Palermo | 404 | 236 |
| 2 | 1925–38 | Roberto Cherro | 305 | 223 |
| 3 | 1931–39 | Francisco Varallo | 222 | 194 |
| 4 | 1922–32 | Domingo Tarasconi | 236 | 192 |
| 5 | 1940–48 | Jaime Sarlanga | 220 | 129 |
| 6 | 1941–49, 1955 | Mario Boyé | 228 | 123 |
| 7 | 1932–38 | Delfín Benítez Cáceres | 176 | 114 |
| 8 | 1911–24 | Pedro Calomino | 226 | 99 |
| 9 | 1941–48 | Pío Corcuera | 187 | 97 |
| 10 | 2001–04, 2015–16, 2018–21 | Carlos Tevez | 279 | 94 |
| 11 | 1996–02, 2007–14 | Juan Román Riquelme | 388 | 92 |
| 12 | 1992–97 | Sergio Martínez | 167 | 86 |
| 12 | 1996–2007 | Guillermo Barros Schelotto | 300 | 86 |
| 14 | 1985–94 | Alfredo Graciani | 250 | 83 |
| 15 | 2005–09 | Rodrigo Palacio | 185 | 82 |
| 16 | 1971–75, 1979–80 | Osvaldo Potente | 195 | 81 |
| 17 | 1963–71 | Ángel Clemente Rojas | 222 | 79 |
| 18 | 1987–92, 1996–98 | Diego Latorre | 242 | 77 |
| 19 | 1960–65 | Paulo Valentim | 111 | 71 |
| 20 | 2016–19, 2022– | Darío Benedetto | 148 | 69 |

Note: Only goals in official competitions are included.
Last updated on: 22 September 2023 – Top 20 scorers of all time (all competitions) at historiadeboca.com.ar

=== League goals ===
Top 20 league scorers
| # | Years | Scorers | Matches | Goals |
|---|---|---|---|---|
| 1 | 1925–38 | Roberto Cherro | 292 | 215 |
| 2 | 1997–00, 2004–2011 | Martín Palermo | 318 | 193 |
| 3 | 1922–32 | Domingo Tarasconi | 226 | 186 |
| 4 | 1931–39 | Francisco Varallo | 209 | 180 |
| 5 | 1940–48 | Jaime Sarlanga | 193 | 114 |
| 6 | 1941–49, 1955 | Mario Boyé | 208 | 112 |
| 7 | 1932–38 | Delfín Benítez Cáceres | 163 | 106 |
| 8 | 1911–24 | Pedro Calomino | 187 | 81 |
| 8 | 1971–75, 1980 | Osvaldo Potente | 194 | 81 |
| 10 | 1992–97 | Sergio Daniel Martínez | 137 | 80 |
| 11 | 1941–48 | Pío Sixto Corcuera | 166 | 79 |
| 12 | 1985–91, 1993–94 | Alfredo Graciani | 218 | 75 |
| 13 | 1987–92, 1996–98 | Diego Latorre | 207 | 68 |
| 14 | 1960–65 | Paulo Valentim | 105 | 67 |
| 14 | 1970–73 | Hugo Curioni | 128 | 67 |
| 14 | 1963–71 | Ángel Clemente Rojas | 190 | 67 |
| 17 | 1978–84 | Ricardo Gareca | 130 | 64 |
| 17 | 1996–02, 2007–14 | Juan Román Riquelme | 292 | 64 |
| 19 | 1996–07 | Guillermo Barros Schelotto | 212 | 62 |
| 20 | 2001–04, 2015–16, 2018–21 | Carlos Tevez | 157 | 57 |

Last updated on: 20 September 2023 – Top 20 league scorers at historiadeboca.com.ar

=== International goals ===
Top 20 international scorers
| # | Years | Scorers | Matches | Goals |
|---|---|---|---|---|
| 1 | 1997–00, 2004–2011 | Martín Palermo | 86 | 43 |
| 2 | 2005–09 | Rodrigo Palacio | 54 | 28 |
| 3 | 1995–02, 2007–2013 | Juan Román Riquelme | 93 | 27 |
| 4 | 2001–04, 2015–16, 2018–21 | Carlos Tevez | 82 | 25 |
| 5 | 1996–07 | Guillermo Barros Schelotto | 88 | 24 |
| 6 | 2000–03, 2005–06 | Marcelo Delgado | 66 | 19 |
| 7 | 1998–02, 2003–04 | Antonio Barijho | 27 | 16 |
| 8 | 1963–71 | Ángel Clemente Rojas | 31 | 12 |
| 9 | 2016–19, 2022– | Darío Benedetto | 27 | 11 |
| 10 | 1964–68 | Alfredo Rojas | 22 | 10 |
| 10 | 1962–67 | Norberto Menéndez | 25 | 10 |
| 10 | 2001–05, 2012 | Rolando Schiavi | 78 | 10 |
| 13 | 1999–00, 2002–03 | Alfredo Moreno | 15 | 9 |
| 13 | 1976–1981 | Ernesto Mastrángelo | 31 | 9 |
| 13 | 1987–92, 1996–98 | Diego Latorre | 35 | 9 |
| 16 | 1986–89 | Jorge Comas | 14 | 8 |
| 16 | 2019–22 | Eduardo Salvio | 22 | 8 |
| 16 | 2018–22 | Ramón Ábila | 25 | 8 |
| 16 | 1985–91, 1993–94 | Alfredo Graciani | 32 | 8 |
| 20 | 1963 | José Sanfilippo | 7 | 7 |
| 20 | 2018–21 | Mauro Zárate | 19 | 7 |
| 20 | 2014–17 | Andrés Chávez | 22 | 7 |
| 20 | 2014–22 | Cristian Pavón | 35 | 7 |

Last updated on: 20 September 2023 – Top 20 international scorers at historiadeboca.com.ar

== Top scorers per season ==
Those players that are bolded were also the Top Scorers of that championship.

1908–1955
| Year | Scorers | Goals |
|---|---|---|
| 1908 | Rafael Pratts | 21 |
| 1909 | Alberto Penney | 7 |
| 1910 | Aquilles Giovanelli | 21 |
| 1911 | Francisco Taggino | 15 |
| 1912 | Francisco Taggino | 7 |
| 1913 | Pedro Calomino; Francisco Taggino | 10 |
| 1914 | Enrique Bertolini; Francisco Taggino | 4 |
| 1915 | Pedro Calomino | 12 |
| 1916 | Pedro Calomino | 10 |
| 1917 | Pedro Calomino | 10 |
| 1918 | Pedro Calomino; Alfredo Martín | 7 |
| 1919 | Pedro Calomino | 8 |
| 1920 | Felipe Galíndez; Alfredo Martín | 9 |
| 1921 | Pablo Bozzo | 8 |
| 1922 | Domingo Tarasconi | 11 |
| 1923 | Domingo Tarasconi | 28 |
| 1924 | Domingo Tarasconi | 16 |
| 1925 | Ángel Tazza | 6 |
| 1926 | Domingo Tarasconi; Roberto Cherro | 18 |
| 1927 | Domingo Tarasconi | 32 |
| 1928 | Roberto Cherro | 33 |
| 1929 | Roberto Cherro | 8 |
| 1930 | Roberto Cherro | 37 |
| 1931 | Francisco Varallo | 26 |
| 1932 | Francisco Varallo | 24 |
| 1933 | Francisco Varallo | 34 |
| 1934 | Roberto Cherro | 22 |
| 1935 | Delfín Benítez Cáceres | 24 |
| 1936 | Francisco Varallo | 18 |
| 1937 | Francisco Varallo | 22 |
| 1938 | Delfín Benítez Cáceres | 20 |
| 1939 | Francisco Varallo; Francisco Shon Sas; Américo Di Leo | 9 |
| 1940 | Jaime Sarlanga | 21 |
| 1941 | Jaime Sarlanga | 18 |
| 1942 | Jaime Sarlanga | 12 |
| 1943 | Jaime Sarlanga | 22 |
| 1944 | Pío Sixto Corcuera | 17 |
| 1945 | Mario Boyé | 18 |
| 1946 | Mario Boyé | 24 |
| 1947 | Mario Boyé | 18 |
| 1948 | Mario Boyé; Heleno de Freitas | 9 |
| 1949 | Francisco Campana | 7 |
| 1950 | Juan José Ferraro | 16 |
| 1951 | Jorge Duilio Benitez | 12 |
| 1952 | Elio Rubén Montaño | 12 |
| 1953 | Roberto Oscar Rolando | 9 |
| 1954 | "Pepino" Borello | 19 |
| 1955 | Ernesto Cucchiaroni | 10 |

1956–2000
| Year | Scorers | Goals |
|---|---|---|
| 1956 | Antonio Valentín Angelillo | 14 |
| 1957 | Juan José Rodríguez | 8 |
| 1958 | Osvaldo Ángel Nardiello | 18 |
| 1959 | Osvaldo Ángel Nardiello | 18 |
| 1960 | Paulo Valentim | 11 |
| 1961 | Paulo Valentim | 24 |
| 1962 | Paulo Valentim | 19 |
| 1963 | José Sanfilippo | 7 |
| 1964 | Paulo Valentim | 10 |
| 1965 | Alfredo Rojas | 17 |
| 1966 | Alfredo Rojas | 17 |
| 1967 | Alfredo Rojas | 11 |
| 1968 | Ángel Clemente Rojas | 8 |
| 1969 | Ángel Clemente Rojas | 14 |
| 1970 | Norberto Madurga | 11 |
| 1971 | Osvaldo Potente | 21 |
| 1972 | Hugo Curioni | 29 |
| 1973 | Hugo Curioni | 24 |
| 1974 | Osvaldo Potente | 21 |
| 1975 | Marcelo Trobbiani | 15 |
| 1976 | Darío Felman | 15 |
| 1977 | Ernesto Mastrángelo | 20 |
| 1978 | Armando Mario Husillos | 8 |
| 1979 | Ernesto Mastrángelo | 9 |
| 1980 | Jorge Ribolzi | 14 |
| 1981 | Diego Maradona | 28 |
| 1982 | Ricardo Gareca | 22 |
| 1983 | Ricardo Gareca | 22 |
| 1984 | Ricardo Gareca | 19 |
| 1985 | Carlos Daniel Tapia | 19 |
| 1986 | Jorge Comas | 23 |
| 1987 | Jorge Comas | 17 |
| 1988–89 | Jorge Comas; Alfredo Graciani | 15 |
| 1989–90 | Alfredo Graciani | 9 |
| Aper/Claus 1991 | Gabriel Batistuta | 18 |
| Clausura 1992 | Diego Latorre | 12 |
| Apertura 1992 | Roberto Cabañas | 7 |
| Clausura 1993 | Roberto Cabañas | 9 |
| Apertura 1993 | Sergio Daniel Martínez | 12 |
| Clausura 1994 | Sergio Daniel Martínez | 8 |
| Apertura 1994 | Sergio Daniel Martínez | 9 |
| Clausura 1995 | Sergio Daniel Martínez | 9 |
| Apertura 1995 | Darío Scotto | 7 |
| Clausura 1996 | Claudio Caniggia | 12 |
| Apertura 1996 | Gabriel Cedrés | 6 |
| **Clausura 1997** | **Sergio Daniel Martínez** | **15** |
| Apertura 1997 | Diego Latorre | 9 |
| Clausura 1998 | Martín Palermo | 13 |
| **Apertura 1998** | **Martín Palermo** | **20** |
| Clausura 1999 | Martín Palermo | 12 |
| Apertura 1999 | Martín Palermo | 14 |
| Clausura 2000 | Alfredo Moreno | 6 |
| Apertura 2000 | Martín Palermo | 11 |

2001–Present
| Year | Scorers | Goals |
|---|---|---|
| Clausura 2001 | Guillermo Barros Schelotto; Juan Román Riquelme | 5 |
| Apertura 2001 | Walter Gaitán | 8 |
| Clausura 2002 | Héctor Bracamonte | 7 |
| Apertura 2002 | Marcelo Delgado | 9 |
| Clausura 2003 | Guillermo Barros Schelotto; Carlos Tevez; Héctor Bracamonte | 5 |
| Apertura 2003 | Carlos Tevez | 8 |
| Clausura 2004 | Antonio Barijho | 6 |
| Apertura 2004 | Martín Palermo | 6 |
| Clausura 2005 | Martín Palermo | 6 |
| Apertura 2005 | Rodrigo Palacio | 10 |
| Clausura 2006 | Martín Palermo | 11 |
| **Apertura 2006** | **Rodrigo Palacio** | **12** |
| Clausura 2007 | Martín Palermo | 11 |
| Apertura 2007 | Martín Palermo | 13 |
| Clausura 2008 | Martín Palermo | 10 |
| Apertura 2008 | Lucas Viatri | 8 |
| Clausura 2009 | Martín Palermo | 7 |
| Apertura 2009 | Martín Palermo | 6 |
| Clausura 2010 | Martín Palermo | 10 |
| Apertura 2010 | Martín Palermo | 8 |
| Clausura 2011 | Martín Palermo | 6 |
| Apertura 2011 | Darío Cvitanich | 5 |
| Clausura 2012 | Pablo Mouche | 6 |
| Inicial 2012 | Santiago Silva | 6 |
| Final 2013 | Santiago Silva | 5 |
| Inicial 2013 | Emanuel Gigliotti | 8 |
| Final 2014 | Emanuel Gigliotti | 8 |
| 2014 | Jonathan Calleri | 6 |
| 2015 | Jonathan Calleri | 10 |
| 2016 | Carlos Tevez | 4 |
| **2016–17** | **Darío Benedetto** | **21** |
| 2017–18 | Darío Benedetto | 9 |
| 2018–19 | Mauro Zárate; Ramón Ábila | 6 |
| 2019–20 | Carlos Tevez | 9 |
| 2021 | Luis Vázquez | 7 |
| 2022 | Luca Langoni | 6 |
| 2023 | Miguel Merentiel | 7 |

Note:League goals only.

=== Most frequent Boca top scorers ===
Most frequent Boca top scorers
| Scorers | Times | Year |
|---|---|---|
| Martín Palermo | 16 | C1998, A1998, C1999, A1999, A2000, A2004, C2005, C2006, C2007, A2007, C2008, C2009, A2009, C2010, A2010, C2011 |
| Pedro Calomino | 6 | 1913, 1915, 1916, 1917, 1918, 1919 |
| Francisco Varallo | 6 | 1931, 1932, 1933, 1936, 1937, 1938, 1939 |
| Roberto Cherro | 5 | 1926, 1928, 1929, 1930, 1934 |
| Sergio Daniel Martínez | 5 | A1993, C1994, A1994, C1995, C1997 |
| Domingo Tarasconi | 5 | 1922, 1923, 1924, 1926, 1927 |

Note:League goals only.
