= Sweden Cup =

The Sweden Cup may refer to:

- Copa Suecia, Argentine football tournament held 1958-1960
- Svenska Cupen, Swedish football tournament
