= Osvaldo Potente =

Argentine footballer

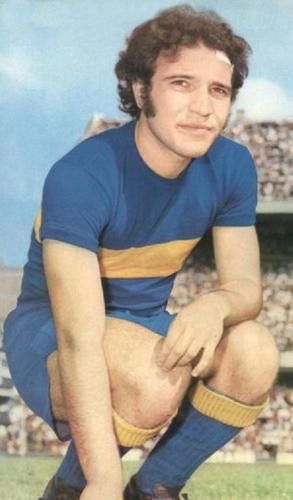
- Potente in Boca Juniors

Personal information
- Full name: Osvaldo Rubén Potente
- Date of birth: 16 November 1951 (age 74)
- Place of birth: Buenos Aires, Argentina
- Position: Striker

Senior career*
Years	Team	Apps	(Gls)
1971–1975	Boca Juniors	177	(77)
1976–1977	Rosario Central	34	(8)
1977–1978	The Strongest	?	(?)
1978–1980	Boca Juniors	18	(2)

International career
?	Argentina	3	(0)
- * Club domestic league appearances and goals as of 12 October 2007

Osvaldo Potente (born 16 November 1951 in Buenos Aires) is a retired Argentine football striker. He played club football in Argentina and Bolivia as well as representing the Argentina national team on three occasions.

== Career ==
Potente started his career in 1971 and went on to become one of Boca Juniors' most prolific goalscorers. In his two spells with the club he managed 79 goals in 195 league games, leaving him in 11th place in the list of Boca Juniors topscorers. Potente is fondly remembered by the Boca Juniors fans for the fact that he scored a total of 7 goals in superclásico derby matches against fierce rivals River Plate. he is still tied with Hugo Curioni as Boca's 2nd most prolific player in the superclásico.

One of Potente's finest superclásico moments came on July 27, 1975, when he played against River Plate at River Plate Stadium. Before the game the River fans paraded a pig wearing a Boca shirt with number 10 on the back. Potente got his revenge by scoring Boca's winning goal from a free kick.

In 1976 Potente fell out of favour with the new Boca manager Juan Carlos Lorenzo and left the club to join Rosario Central and then Bolivian team The Strongest.

In 1978 Potente returned to Boca, but he never recovered the form that gave him so many goals in the early 70s. He retired from playing in July 1980.

After retirement Potente had a brief spell as interim head coach of Boca Juniors in 1993.
