= Roberto Cherro =

Argentine footballer (1907–1965)

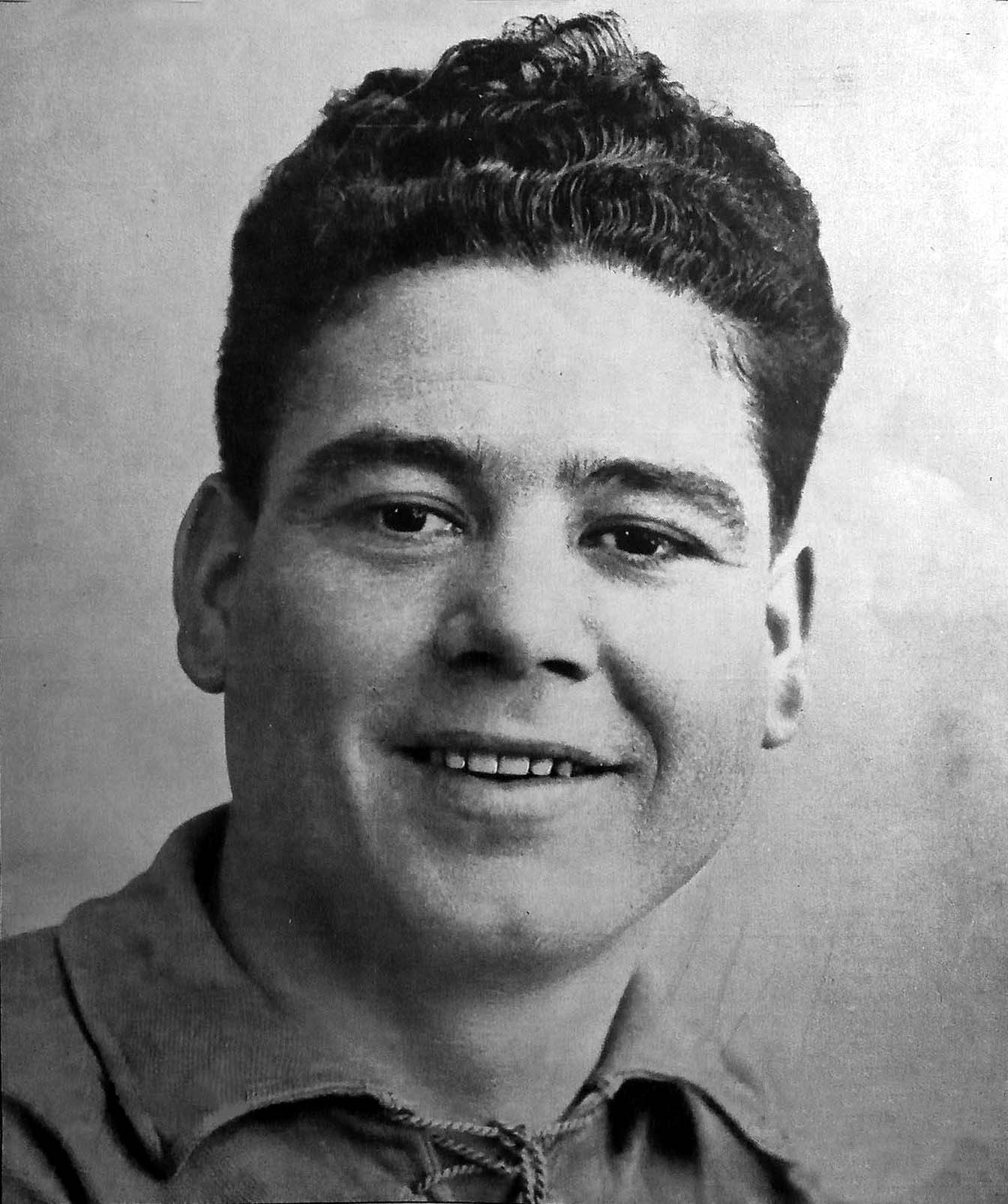
- Cherro in 1933

Personal information
- Full name: Roberto Eugenio Cerro
- Date of birth: 23 February 1907
- Place of birth: Barracas, Argentina
- Date of death: 11 October 1965 (aged 58)
- Place of death: Quilmes, Argentina
- Height: 1.74 m (5 ft 8 1/2 in)
- Position: Striker

Youth career
- Sportivo Barracas

Senior career*
Years	Team	Apps	(Gls)
1924	Sportivo Barracas	21	(15)
1925	Ferro Carril Oeste	26	(4)
1926–1938	Boca Juniors	305	(221)

International career
1926–1937	Argentina	16	(13)
Medal record
Men's Football
Representing Argentina
Copa América
Winner	1929 Argentina	Team
Winner	1937 Argentina	Team
FIFA World Cup
Runner-up	1930 Uruguay	Team
Olympic Games
Silver medal – second place	1928 Amsterdam	Team
- * Club domestic league appearances and goals

Roberto Eugenio Cerro, named "Cherro" (23 February 1907 – 11 October 1965) was an Argentine football striker. He was born in Barracas in the city of Buenos Aires in Argentina. He played the majority of his career with Boca Juniors, he scored 221 goals in 305 games for the club (in all official competitions), making him Boca Juniors' highest scoring player until his record was surpassed by Martín Palermo in 2010. He also ranks 5th. among the all-time Primera División top scorers, with 236 goals in 345 league matches.

Cherro won five league titles with Boca Juniors, being also the club's top scorer on five occasions (1926, 1928, and 1930 with 20, 32 and 37 goals respectively). He was also part of the Argentina national team that won the silver medal at the 1928 Summer Olympics. Later, he was a radio sports commentator, together with the renowned Fioravanti, in the 60s.

== International career ==
Cherro won the Copa América in 1929 with the Argentina national football team.

On 5 February 1933, Cherro famously scored all four goals in a 4–1 win over arch enemies Uruguay.

== Titles ==
Boca Juniors

- Argentine Primera División: (5) 1926, 1930, 1931, 1934, 1935
- Copa Estímulo (1): 1926

Argentina

- Copa América: 1929, 1937
- Summer Olympics Silver Medal: 1928
- FIFA World Cup: Runner-up 1930
