= 1926 Copa Estímulo Final =

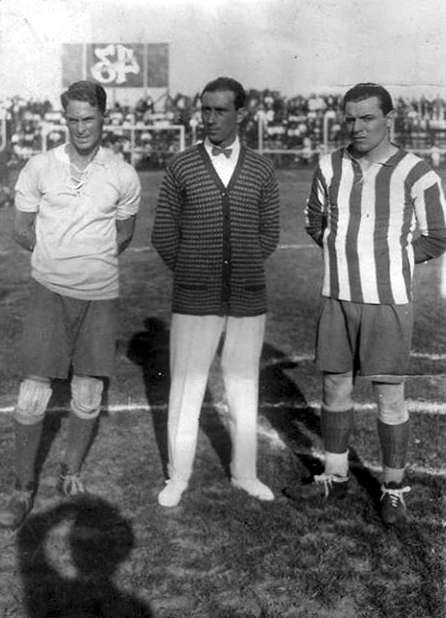
- Américo Tesoriere, referee Barbera, and Salvador Carreras before the match
- Event: Copa Estímulo
Boca Juniors	Sportivo Balcarce
3	1
- Date: January 30, 1927; 98 years ago
- Venue: San Lorenzo
- Referee: Barbera

The 1926 Copa Estímulo Final was the final that decided the winner of the 2nd (and last) edition of this Argentine domestic cup. Boca Juniors defeated Sportivo Balcarce 3–1 at San Lorenzo de Almagro Stadium.

== Qualified teams ==
Team	Previous finals app.
Boca Juniors	(none)
Sportivo Balcarce	(none)

== Overview ==
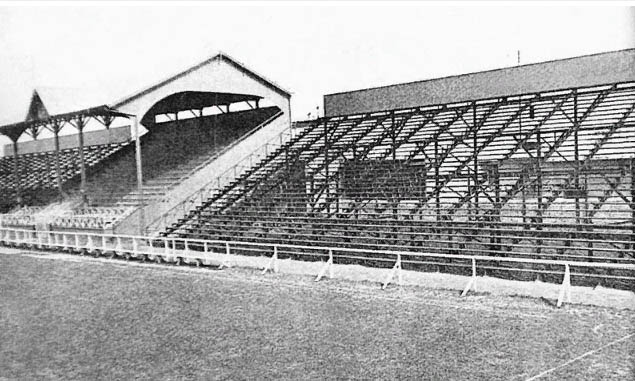
San Lorenzo de Almagro, venue for the match

Boca Juniors shared Group D with Sportsman, Argentino de Quilmes and Del Plata, playing each other in a single round-robin. Boca finished 1st therefore qualified to the semifinals v Chacarita Juniors. As the team from San Martín withdrew, Boca Juniors directly qualified to the final, held at San Lorenzo de Almagro's venue, Estadio Gasómetro, on 27 Jan 1927.

Although some versions state the cup had a third edition in 1929, it was indeed played under the Primera División season format (being Gimnasia y Esgrima (LP) the winner).

== Road to the final ==
Boca Juniors		Round	Sportivo Balcarce	
Opponent	Result	Group stage	Opponent	Result
Sportsman	2–0 (N) (Note: Played at Huracán Stadium.)	Matchday 1	Porteño	4–0 (H)
Del Plata	2–3 (N)	Matchday 2	General San Martín	3–3 (A)
Argentino de Quilmes	3–1 (N) (Note: Played at Del Plata Stadium.)	Matchday 3	Universal	1–0 (H)
Del Plata	1–2 (N)	Matchday 4	San Fernando	3–1 (H)
Chacarita Juniors	wp–lp (Note: Boca Juniors won on points after Chacarita withdrew.)	Semifinal	Huracán	2–1 (H)

== Match details ==
1926 Copa Estímulo Final
30 January 1927

Boca Juniors	3–1	Sportivo Balcarce
Cherro 20'; Bisio 59'; Delgado 68'	Report	Heredia 47'

San Lorenzo Stadium
Referee: Barbera

Boca Juniors	Sp. Balcarce

GK	(Argentina) Américo Tesoriere
DF	(Argentina) Ludovico Bidoglio
DF	(Argentina) Ramón Muttis
MF	(Argentina) Ángel Médici
MF	(Argentina) Alfredo Garasini
MF	(Argentina) José Stábile
FW	(Argentina) Domingo Tarasconi
FW	(Argentina) Roberto Cherro
FW	(Argentina) Julio Bisio
FW	(Argentina) Benjamín Delgado
FW	(Argentina) Roberto Filiberti

GK	(Argentina) Manuel Levalle
DF	(Argentina) Salvador Puntis
DF	(Argentina) Amado Rousell
MF	(Argentina) Ricardo Coronas
MF	(Argentina) Ramón García
MF	(Argentina) Juan C. Campos
FW	(Argentina) Juan Morelli
FW	(Argentina) Antonio Cerrotti
FW	(Argentina) Salvador Carreras
FW	(Argentina) Clemente Heredia
FW	(Argentina) Pedro Bardayes
