= Martín Palermo =

Argentine footballer (born 1973)

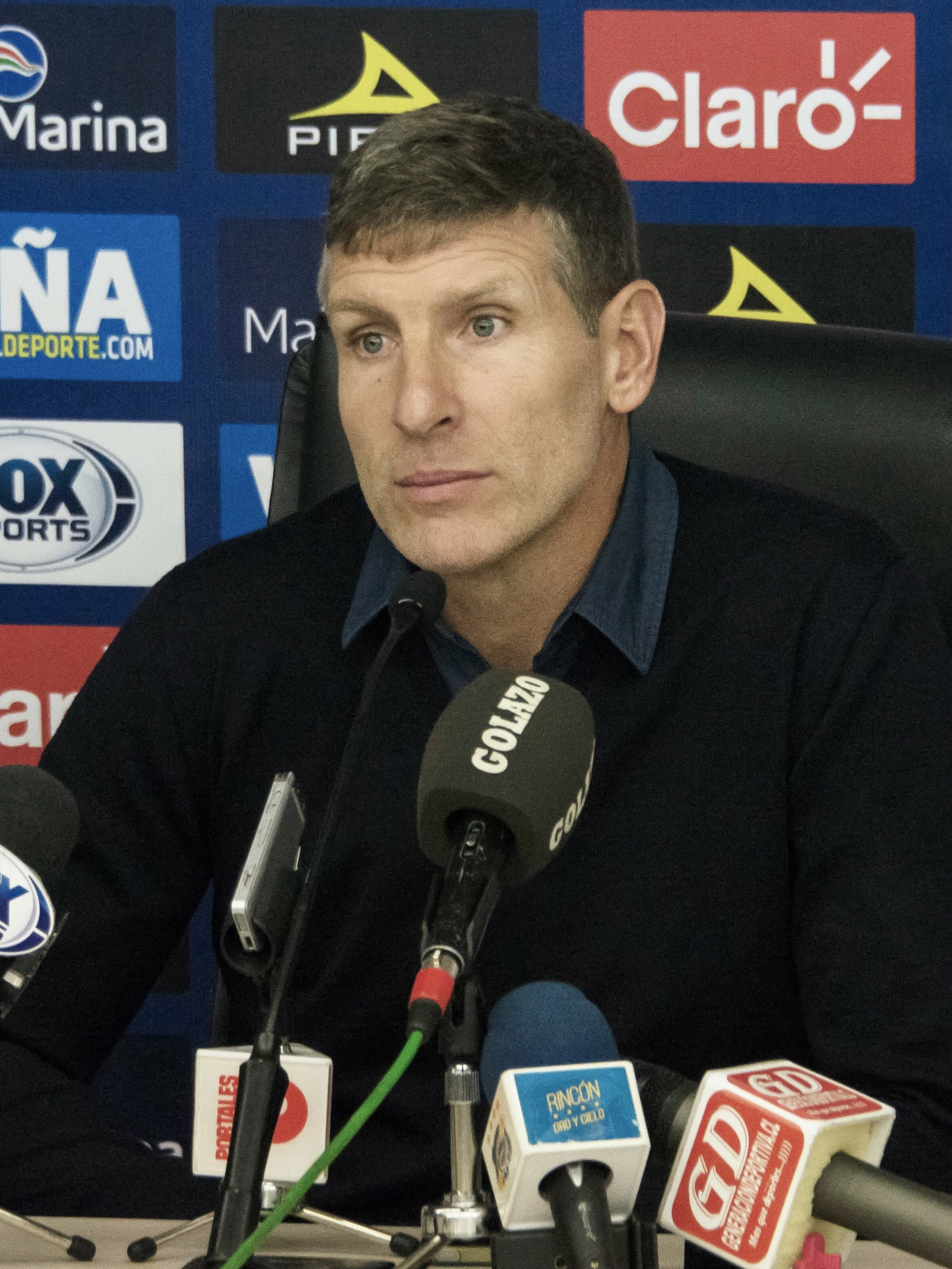
- Palermo in 2018

Personal information
- Full name: Martín Palermo
- Date of birth: 7 November 1973 (age 52)
- Place of birth: La Plata, Buenos Aires, Argentina
- Height: 1.88 m (6 ft 2 in)
- Position: Striker

Team information
- Current team: Platense (manager)

Youth career
- Estudiantes de La Plata

Senior career*
Years	Team	Apps	(Gls)
1992–1997	Estudiantes de La Plata	93	(34)
1997–2001	Boca Juniors	102	(81)
2001–2003	Villarreal	70	(18)
2003–2004	Betis	11	(1)
2004	Alavés	14	(3)
2004–2011	Boca Juniors	216	(112)
Total		592	(249)

International career
1999–2010	Argentina	15	(9)

Managerial career
- 2012–2013: Godoy Cruz
- 2014–2015: Arsenal de Sarandí
- 2016–2018: Unión Española
- 2019: Pachuca
- 2020–2021: Curicó Unido
- 2021–2022: Aldosivi
- 2023: Platense
- 2024–2025: Olimpia
- 2025: Fortaleza
- 2026–: Platense
- * Club domestic league appearances and goals

Martín Palermo (Spanish pronunciation: [maɾˈtim paˈleɾmo]; born 7 November 1973) is an Argentine football manager and former player who played as a striker. He is the current manager of Platense.

Palermo played mainly as a forward for Boca Juniors. A prolific goalscorer, he is Boca Juniors' all-time top scorer with 236 goals, and is placed 7th among all-time Primera División top scorers with 227 goals in 408 matches. He also played in Argentina for Estudiantes de La Plata and in Spain for Villarreal, Real Betis, and Alavés. During his playing career, he was nicknamed Loco (pronounced [ˈloko], English: crazy) and Titán (pronounced [tiˈtan], English: titan). In a 2008 poll, Boca Juniors fans chose him as the greatest idol in the club's history.

With the Argentina national team, Palermo earned 15 caps and scored 9 goals. He played at the 1999 Copa América and the 2010 FIFA World Cup, with a decade-long hiatus in between. Since 2012, he has worked as a manager in Argentina, Chile, Mexico, and Paraguay.

== Club career ==
=== Estudiantes ===
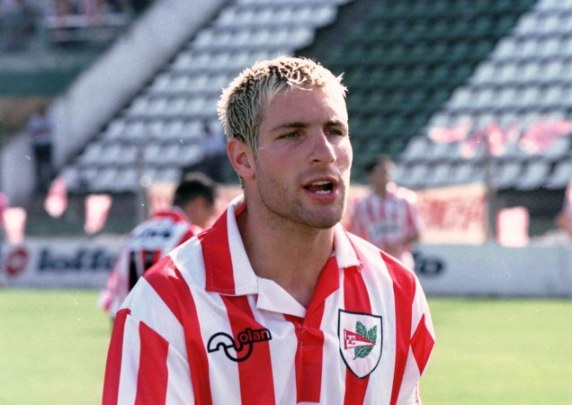
Palermo in 1997 while playing for Estudiantes de La Plata

Born in La Plata, Buenos Aires, Palermo began his career at Estudiantes de La Plata and played there for five years from 1992 to 1997 and later was transferred to Boca Juniors.

=== Boca Juniors ===
Palermo had a slow to start with Boca Juniors. In their seventh match of the 1997 Apertura on 30 September 1997, he scored his first goal in a 2–1 victory against Independiente. In 1999, Palermo's good goal average and performances with Boca and with the Argentina national team led European teams Lazio, Real Betis, and Milan to be interested in signing him up. But on 13 November 1999, in a game against Colón, he had a complete tear of the anterior cruciate ligament of his right knee; before leaving and without knowing the seriousness of the injury, he scored his 100th goal in the Argentine First Division.

He took six months to recover from the injury. On 24 May 2000, he returned, playing the last fifteen minutes of the quarterfinal match of the Copa Libertadores against River Plate and scoring a goal, leaving the score at 3–0 to Boca Juniors (the first match had ended 1–2).

He played in the Intercontinental Cup in 2000, scoring the two goals in Boca's 2–1 victory over Real Madrid, winning the man of the match award and catching the attention of football clubs in Spain.

=== Spell in Spain ===
Palermo signed with Spanish La Liga newcomers Villarreal in January 2001, on a deal for the next four seasons. The transfer fee was 1.2 billion Spanish pesetas (€7.2 million). He made his debut on 5 February in a 2–0 home win over Alavés, in which he was substituted after 65 minutes for goalscorer Gheorghe Craioveanu. A week later, he scored his first goal to equalise in a 3–1 win at Real Oviedo. He scored six goals in 17 games in his first season for the team from the Province of Castellón, including one on 22 April as he was sent off in a 2–2 draw against Mallorca.

On 29 November 2001, Palermo scored an extra-time goal away to Levante in the last 32 of the Copa del Rey. He celebrated by standing on a small concrete wall, which collapsed under the weight of his team's fans and broke both the tibia and fibula of his left leg. He did not recover until April 2002. On 5 May, his first start since the recovery, he took nine minutes to score in a 2–1 win over Real Zaragoza.

Villarreal reached the final of the 2002 UEFA Intertoto Cup, and Palermo was sent off for a foul on Josemi as they lost on aggregate to compatriots Málaga; the Spaniard also received a red card for retaliation. He did not score a league goal until the 11th game, when he netted in a 1–1 draw at a Mallorca side who were chasing first place. The 2002–03 season produced his best league figures of seven goals for Villarreal, but he left by mutual consent on 20 August 2003 after the Yellow Submarine added Sonny Anderson and José Mari to their front line.

The day after leaving Villarreal, Palermo signed for Real Betis of the same league on a one-year deal with the option of two more. He played only 12 total games for the team from Seville, scoring once on 3 September in a 2–2 home draw with Espanyol.

Palermo left Betis in March 2004 due to lack of playing time, and joined Alavés in the Segunda División. He scored three times in 14 games.

=== Back to Boca Juniors ===
On 13 July 2004, Palermo returned to Boca Juniors. On 17 December he scored his 100th goal with Boca on the final of the 2004 Copa Sudamericana a 2–0 victory over Bolívar.

On 26 May 2005, Palermo scored twice in a 4–0 Copa Libertadores victory over Atletico Junior, with Boca winning 7–3 on aggregate after a 3–3 draw in the first leg and qualifying to the Quarterfinals, which would be played against Chivas Guadalajara. In the first leg against Chivas at Estadio Jalisco, Boca suffered a heavy 4–0 defeat. In the second leg at home on 2 June, Palermo was involved in a brawl with Chivas player Adolfo Bautista and was sent off, and the match was eventually finished early due to a large brawl.

On 22 November 2005, in the first leg of the Copa Sudamericana SF against Chilean club Universidad Católica, Palermo scored Boca's second goal to tie the score at 2–2; this goal proved to be very important as Boca won 1–0 away in the second leg and qualified to the finals. In the second leg of the Copa Sudamericana finals on 18 December 2005 against Pumas UNAM, Palermo scored a goal in the match which eventually finished 1–1 and went to penalties. In the penalty shootout, Palermo missed his penalty, but regardless Boca were champions after winning the shootout 4–3.

Palermo, once again back in top form, remained one of the best scorers in the Argentine league, scoring 11 goals in three consecutive matches (2006 Clausura, 2006 Apertura and top scorer of the 2007 Clausura). During the 2007 Clausura tournament he had several memorable moments, on 25 February he scored a half pitch goal in the last seconds of a 3–1 victory over Independiente and two weeks later, on 10 March, he scored three goals against his former team Estudiantes in a 3–1 Boca victory at La Plata. It was the fourth hat-trick of his career. A game later, on 18 March, he scored a career-high of four goals in the 5–1 victory against Gimnasia de la Plata, Estudiantes de La Plata's arch-rivals.

The following season the 2007 Apertura, he continued to be among the Argentine league top scorers with 13 goals. His best game that season was on 16 September, in a game against Banfield, in which he scored four goals, in the 6–0 Boca victory.

In the second leg of the 2008 Copa Libertadores QF against Atlas, Palermo scored his fifth career hat-trick in a 3–0 victory in Jalisco, Mexico, on 21 May 2008, a hat-trick which sent Boca to the Copa Libertadores semi-finals. In the semifinals against Fluminense, Boca lost 5–3 on aggregate, with Palermo scoring Boca's only goal in the 3–1 loss in Rio de Janeiro.

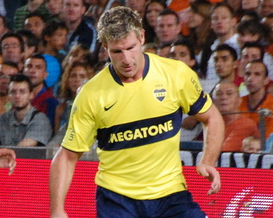
Palermo during the 2008 Joan Gamper Trophy match

At the beginning of the 2008 Apertura, on 24 August he suffered yet another serious injury, this time he injured his anterior cruciate and tore his medial collateral ligament during the 2–1 victory against Lanús, with an expected recovery period of 5 to 8 months. After this was known, Argentine coach Alfio Basile said that he had chosen him to play for the national team for the following match in the World Cup qualifiers.

Palermo's first goal since his injury came on the fourth game he played, during a 3–1 victory over Huracán on 1 March in the 2009 Clausura; this was Martín Palermo's 195 goal with Boca Juniors, breaking Francisco Varallo record of 194 goals in the professional era. Nearly two months later. on 30 April, Martín scored a bicycle kick goal, which gave him 200 goals with Boca Juniors, in a 3–0 victory against Deportivo Táchira.

During the 2009 Apertura, on 4 October in a game against Vélez Sársfield, Martín Palermo scored a very special goal (a header that traveled around 38.9 meters). This goal gave him 200 goals in the Argentine First Division and also gave Boca a 3–2 victory.

On 22 July 2010, at 36 years of age, Palermo announced that he had renewed his contract with Boca Juniors for one year and that he would retire at the end of the contract. Palermo scored his sixth career hat-trick on 19 September 2010 in a 3–1 Boca victory over Colón.

On 13 December 2010, Palermo scored his 300th career goal in the final match of the 2010 Apertura in a 1–1 draw against Gimnasia de La Plata.

On 24 April 2011, Palermo scored the third goal of Boca Juniors against Huracán in a 3–0 away win, ending a streak of 10 matches without scoring. Then he scored in the next consecutive matches against Independiente, Argentinos Juniors and in the 2–0 victory over River Plate in the Superclasico.

Palermo achieved legendary status in Boca in the last few years, thanks to his many memorable goals for both the club and the Argentina national team. On 12 June 2011, Palermo played his last home match at La Bombonera, after the match Martín was honored by the club and was given several gifts, among them being one of the goal frames in the stadium.

Palermo officially retired from football on 18 June 2011, in a 2–2 draw against his classic rival Gimnasia de La Plata. He provided a headed assist for Boca's second goal in the last minute of the match, marking the end of a 19-year playing career at senior level.

== International career ==
With the Argentina national football team, Palermo played fifteen matches and scored nine goals. He is in the Guinness Book of World Records for missing three penalties for Argentina in a single international match against Colombia in the 1999 Copa América; the first penalty rebounded off the crossbar; the second penalty went over; the third was saved by the Colombian goalkeeper, Miguel Calero. Though his international career seemed to be over at the end of 1999, the 2008 Argentine national coach Alfio Basile stated that he had been considering offering Palermo a return to international football and was disappointed that Palermo was injured at the time.

In September 2009, Diego Maradona recalled Palermo to the national team and introduced him as a substitute in a 2010 World Cup qualifying match against Paraguay after a 10-year exile from the international scene. A couple of weeks later he was once again called up to play a friendly against Ghana. In this game, Palermo was part of the starting eleven and made the most of it by scoring both of Argentina's goals, resulting in a 2–0 win. Palermo's next match was on 10 October, a 2010 World Cup qualifier against Peru. Palermo sealed a 2–1 victory for Argentina with a 93rd-minute strike, causing Maradona to describe the goal after the game as "one more miracle of Saint Palermo."

On 19 May 2010, Palermo was selected by Maradona as part of the Argentina national team's 23-man final roster for the 2010 FIFA World Cup in South Africa, Palermo's first World Cup. On 22 June 2010, Palermo played his first World Cup match, coming in as a substitute in the second half of Argentina's final group match against Greece. In the 89th minute, he scored his first ever World Cup goal on a rebound from a shot by Lionel Messi. Argentina won the match 2–0 and finished at the top of their group. This goal also made Palermo the oldest Argentine national footballer to score a goal in World Cup play at 36, following Maradona at 33, until a 2026 goal by nearly 39-year-old Messi.

== Managerial career ==
In May 2012, Carlos Bilardo recommended Palermo for the open manager position at Estudiantes de La Plata stating "He can manage it, he is a man from the club" Bilardo also mention that the previous times that he had recommended someone (Alejandro Sabella and Diego Simeone) Estudiantes had won championships.

=== Godoy Cruz ===
On 26 November 2012, Palermo was announced as the head coach of Godoy Cruz alongside former teammate Roberto Abbondanzieri. Placing fourteenth in the Argentine Primera Division Torneo Inicial and seventh place in the Argentine Primera Division Torneo Final of the recently known as Superliga. As the 2012–13 season ended so did his tenure at the club.

=== Arsenal de Sarandí ===
On 18 April 2014, Palermo was appointed as head coach of Arsenal de Sarandí. He took charge for the 2014–15 season, where the club managed to place in ninth. On 19 April 2015, he announced his departure from the club, resigning from his position.

=== Unión Española ===
Palermo's next role was with Chilean side Unión Española; In his first tournament, 2016 Torneo Apertura, they finished in third place of the Chilean Primera Division, and runners-up in the 2017 Campeonato Nacional. However, in November 2018, with results suffering the club decided to part ways with Palermo.

=== Pachuca ===
Palermo returned to management and on 22 January 2019, when he was confirmed as the new manager of Mexican side Pachuca on a one-year deal after Pako Ayestarán resigned. He left at the end of his contract.

=== Curicó Unido ===
In November 2020, after more than a year without a club, Palermo was appointed the manager of Curicó Unido. His time there was largely unsuccessful, and nine months later he resigned from his post.

=== Aldosivi ===
Back to Argentina, on 30 September 2021, Palermo became the manager of Aldosivi. In May 2022, he resigned after a falling with the club management.

=== Platense ===
In November 2022, Palermo is presented as the new coach of Platense. During his time at the helm of Platense, he would lead them to the final of the 2023 Copa de la Liga Profesional, but his team would lose 1–0 to Rosario Central and he would subsequently resign.

=== Olimpia ===
In February 2024, Palermo agreed to become the new head coach of Paraguayan club Olimpia. On his first year with the team, he won his first title as a club manager.

Palermo was sacked by Olimpia on 10 April 2025, with the club in the fifth position of the Apertura.

=== Fortaleza ===
On 3 September, Palermo replaced Renato Paiva at the helm of Campeonato Brasileiro Série A club Fortaleza. With the club in the 19th place, he won 2–0 over Vitória on his debut.

After four losses in the subsequent six matches, Palermo led Laion to a nine-match unbeaten run, which included wins over eventual champions Flamengo at home and away successes over Bahia and Red Bull Bragantino. On 11 December 2025, after failing to avoid relegation, he left the club.

=== Platense return ===
On 5 August 2026, Palermo returned to Argentina and Platense, replacing Walter Zunino.

== Career statistics ==
=== Club ===
Appearances and goals by club, season and competition
Club	Season	League			National Cup		Continental		Other		Total	
Club	Season	Division	Apps	Goals	Apps	Goals	Apps	Goals	Apps	Goals	Apps	Goals
Estudiantes	1991–92	Clausura	1	0	—		—		—		1	0
Estudiantes	1992–93	Apertura	2	0	—		1 (Note: Supercopa Sudamericana)	0	—		10	1
Estudiantes	1992–93	Clausura	7	1	—		1	0	—		10	1
Estudiantes	1993–94	Apertura	10	0	—		1	0	—		18	1
Estudiantes	1993–94	Clausura	7	1	—		1	0	—		18	1
Estudiantes	1994–95	Primera B	3	0	—		2	0	—		5	0
Estudiantes	1995–96	Apertura	8	6	—		—		—		27	17
Estudiantes	1995–96	Clausura	19	11	—		—		—		27	17
Estudiantes	1996–97	Apertura	19	6	—		2	2	—		38	17
Estudiantes	1996–97	Clausura	17	9	—		2	2	—		38	17
Estudiantes	Total		93	34	—		6	2	—		99	36
Boca Juniors	1997–98	Apertura	17	8	—		4	1	—		36	21
Boca Juniors	1997–98	Clausura	15	12	—		4	1	—		36	21
Boca Juniors	1998–99	Apertura	19	20	—		4 (Note: Copa Mercosur)	3	—		39	35
Boca Juniors	1998–99	Clausura	16	12	—		4	3	—		39	35
Boca Juniors	1999–2000	Apertura	13	14	—		5	2	—		26	21
Boca Juniors	1999–2000	Clausura	4	4	—		4 (Note: Copa Libertadores)	1	—		26	21
Boca Juniors	2000–01	Apertura	18	11	—		4	1	1 (Note: Intercontinental Cup)	2	23	14
Boca Juniors	Total		102	81	—		21	8	1	2	124	91
Villarreal	2000–01	La Liga	17	6	—		—		—		17	6
Villarreal	2001–02	La Liga	19	5	2	2	—		—		21	7
Villarreal	2002–03	La Liga	34	7	1	1	8 (Note: UEFA Intertoto Cup)	0	—		43	8
Villarreal	Total		70	18	3	3	8	0	—		81	21
Real Betis	2003–04	La Liga	11	1	1	0	—		—		12	1
Alavés	2003–04	Segunda	14	3	—		—		—		14	3
Boca Juniors	2004–05	Apertura	13	6	—		6 (Note: Copa Sudamericana)	3	1 (Note: Recopa Sudamericana)	0	40	21
Boca Juniors	2004–05	Clausura	12	6	—		9	6	1	0	40	21
Boca Juniors	2005–06	Apertura	16	7	—		7	4	—		43	22
Boca Juniors	2005–06	Clausura	19	11	—		7	4	—		43	22
Boca Juniors	2006–07	Apertura	16	11	—		1	0	2	1	47	27
Boca Juniors	2006–07	Clausura	16	11	—		12	4	2	1	47	27
Boca Juniors	2007–08	Apertura	19	13	—		2	2	2 (Note: FIFA Club World Cup)	0	49	32
Boca Juniors	2007–08	Clausura	14	10	—		12	7	2	0	49	32
Boca Juniors	2008–09	Apertura	2	0	—		7	5	1	1	25	13
Boca Juniors	2008–09	Clausura	15	7	—		7	5	1	1	25	13
Boca Juniors	2009–10	Apertura	17	6	—		2	0	—		38	16
Boca Juniors	2009–10	Clausura	19	10	—		2	0	—		38	16
Boca Juniors	2010–11	Apertura	19	8	—		—		—		38	14
Boca Juniors	2010–11	Clausura	19	6	—		—		—		38	14
Boca Juniors	Total		216	112	—		58	31	6	2	280	145
Career total			506	249	4	3	93	41	7	4	610	297

=== International ===
Appearances and goals by national team and year
National team	Year	Apps	Goals
Argentina	1999	7	3
Argentina	2000	0	0
Argentina	2001	0	0
Argentina	2002	0	0
Argentina	2003	0	0
Argentina	2004	0	0
Argentina	2005	0	0
Argentina	2006	0	0
Argentina	2007	0	0
Argentina	2008	0	0
Argentina	2009	3	3
Argentina	2010	5	3
Total		15	9

Scores and results list Argentina's goal tally first, score column indicates score after each Palermo goal.

List of international goals scored by Martín Palermo
No.	Date	Venue	Opponent	Score	Result	Competition	Ref.
1	1 July 1999	Estadio Feliciano Cáceres, Luque, Paraguay	Ecuador	2–0	3–1	1999 Copa América	
2	1 July 1999	Estadio Feliciano Cáceres, Luque, Paraguay	Ecuador	3–0	3–1	1999 Copa América	
3	7 July 1999	Estadio Feliciano Cáceres, Luque, Paraguay	Uruguay	2–0	2–0	1999 Copa América	
4	30 September 2009	Estadio Córdoba, Córdoba, Argentina	Ghana	1–0	2–0	Friendly	
5	30 September 2009	Estadio Córdoba, Córdoba, Argentina	Ghana	2–0	2–0	Friendly	
6	10 October 2009	Estadio Monumental, Buenos Aires, Argentina	Peru	2–1	2–1	2010 FIFA World Cup qualification	
7	10 February 2010	Estadio José María Minella, Mar del Plata, Argentina	Jamaica	1–1	2–1	Friendly	
8	5 May 2010	Cutral Có, Argentina	Haiti	2–0	4–0	Friendly	
9	22 June 2010	Peter Mokaba Stadium, Polokwane, South Africa	Greece	2–0	2–0	2010 FIFA World Cup	

== Managerial statistics ==
As of 23 October 2026

Team	Nat	From	To	Record							
Team	Nat	From	To	G	W	D	L	GF	GA	GD	Win %
Godoy Cruz	(Argentina)	27 November 2012	31 December 2013	44	14	17	13	44	38	+6	31.82
Arsenal	(Argentina)	16 April 2014	19 April 2015	36	11	10	15	45	50	−5	30.56
Unión Española	(Chile)	1 June 2016	3 November 2018	93	39	28	26	136	117	+19	41.94
Pachuca	(Mexico)	25 January 2019	31 December 2019	39	15	11	13	64	49	+15	38.46
Curicó Unido	(Chile)	27 November 2020	25 July 2021	27	4	8	15	28	44	−16	14.81
Aldosivi	(Argentina)	28 September 2021	31 May 2022	27	12	5	10	31	35	−4	44.44
Platense	(Argentina)	1 January 2023	18 December 2023	46	15	15	16	43	48	−5	32.61
Olimpia	(Paraguay)	13 February 2024	9 April 2025	58	27	17	14	77	55	+22	46.55
Fortaleza	(Brazil)	3 September 2025	11 December 2025	17	8	4	5	23	24	−1	47.06
Platense	(Argentina)	5 August 2026	present	17	5	7	5	16	17	−1	29.41
Career totals				404	150	122	132	507	477	+30	37.13

== Honours ==
=== Player ===
Estudiantes

- Primera B Nacional: 1994–95

Boca Juniors

- Primera División: 1998 Apertura, 1999 Clausura, 2000 Apertura, 2005 Apertura, 2006 Clausura, 2008 Apertura
- Copa Libertadores: 2000, 2007
- Copa Sudamericana: 2004, 2005
- Recopa Sudamericana: 2006, 2008
- Intercontinental Cup: 2000

Individual

- Primera División top scorer: 1998 Apertura (20 goals, short tournament record), 2007 Clausura
- South American Footballer of the Year: 1998
- South American Team of the Year: 1998, 2000
- Intercontinental Cup Most Valuable Player of the Match Award: 2000
- American Golden Shoe: 2007 (shared with Giancarlo Maldonado)
- Konex Award Merit Diploma as one of the five best football players of the last decade in Argentina: 2010

=== Manager ===
Unión Española

- Primera División runner-up: 2017

Platense

- Copa de la Liga Profesional runner-up: 2023

Olimpia

- Primera División: 2024 Clausura

=== Records and facts ===
- First professional match: 5 July 1992 Clausura. (San Lorenzo 0–0 Estudiantes)
- First professional goal: 22 May 1993 Clausura. (Estudiantes 3–0 San Martín de Tucumán)
- First International match: 3 February 1999. (Venezuela 0–2 Argentina)
- First International goal: 1 July 1999. (Ecuador 1–3 Argentina)
- First European professional match: 4 February 2001. (Villarreal 2–0 Alavés)
- First European professional goal: 11 February 2001. (Oviedo 1–3 Villarreal)
- He is in the Guinness book of records for having missed three penalty kicks in the same match, against Colombia in the 1999 Copa América.
- Palermo holds an Italian passport, which enables him to play as a UEFA player.
- World Cup debut: 22 June 2010 in a match against Greece in the 2010 World Cup.
- Oldest player to score for the Argentina national football team: 36 years and 7 months old, scored the second goal of Argentina's 2–0 win over Greece (This record was previously held by Diego Armando Maradona, who was 33 years old when he scored his last goal in a 1994 World Cup match, also against Greece).
- Tied for 5th place of all time in a career among the Argentine Primera División top scorers with 227 goals (34 with Estudiantes and 193 with Boca Juniors).
- 1st place among Boca's all-time top scorers with 236 goals, having surpassed the 221 goal mark of Roberto Cherro.
- Top scorer in the professional era among Boca's top scorers with 236 Goals. (193 in Primera división Argentine tournaments and 43 in international tournaments)
- Boca Junior's top scorer in international matches with 43 goals, 15 more than 2nd place Rodrigo Palacio.
