= 1908 Club Atlético Boca Juniors season =

Boca Juniors
1908 season
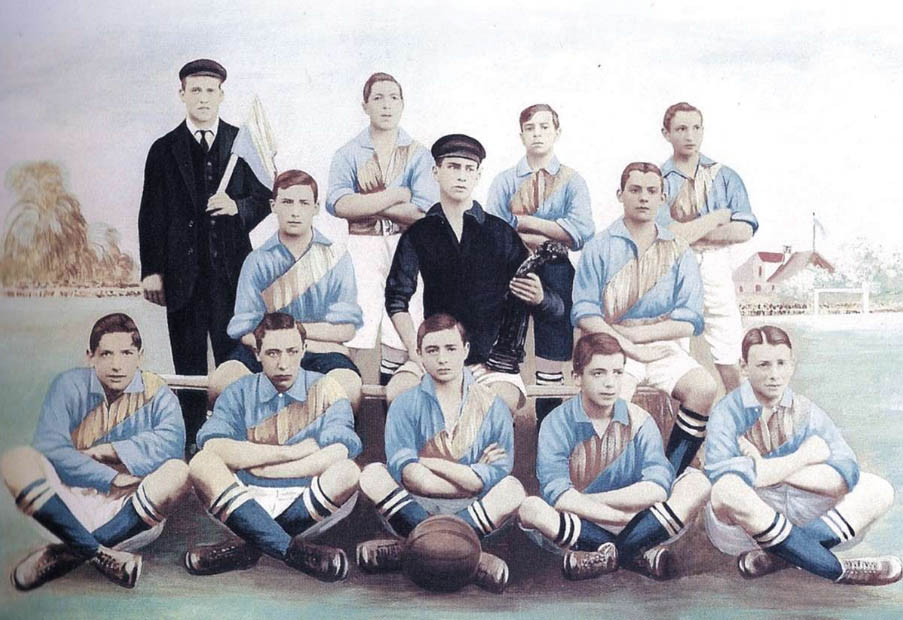
- President: Pablo Giúdice
- Manager: (none)
- Stadium: Isla Demarchi
- Primera B: 1st. of Group C, eliminated in semifinal
- Top goalscorer: Rafael Pratts (21)
- Biggest win: Boca Jrs. 7–0 Bernal (10 May)
Home colours

The 1908 Club Atlético Boca Juniors season was the squad's debuting season in Primera B (then named "Segunda División"), the 2nd. level of Argentine league system. After winning some friendly tournaments, the executives of the club decided to affiliate it to the Argentine Football Association. As there was no promotion and relegation system by then, Boca Juniors registered to the second level to play official competitions for the first time in the history of the club.

Boca Juniors' debut in official tournaments was on May 3, 1908, when the squad defeated Belgrano A.C. II by 3–1 in the stadium of Virrey del Pino and Superí of Belgrano neighborhood. Boca Juniors starting line-up for that historic match was: Juan de los Santos; Marcelino Vergara, Luis Cerezo; Guillermo Ryan, Alberto Penney, Juan Priano; Arturo Penney, Manuel Eloiso, Rafael Pratts, Pedro Moltedo, José María Farenga. Boca Juniors' goals were scored by Pratts (2) and Eloiso. Gibraltar-born Rafael Pratts also became the first player to score a goal for Boca Juniors in official matches. The squad finished in first place (among eight teams) and qualified for the next stage, the semifinal, where Boca was defeated by Racing Club 1–0.

The team played in a field located at southwest of Buenos Aires, near the Isla Demarchi and Puerto Madero. Although Boca finished 1st. in the regular season with 29 points in 16 matches played, the team did not promote to Primera División so the squad lost to Racing Club de Avellaneda at playoffs. Then Racing lost to River Plate the final.

== Squad ==
Note: Flags indicate national team as defined under FIFA eligibility rules; some limited exceptions apply. Players may hold more than one non-FIFA nationality.

No.	Pos.	Nation	Player
—	GK	(Argentina) ARG	Juan A. De los Santos
—	DF	(Uruguay) URU	Luis Cerezo
—	DF	(Argentina) ARG	Esteban Marcolino
—	DF	(Argentina) ARG	Máximo Pieralini
—	FW	(Argentina) ARG	Pedro Moltedo
—	MF	(Argentina) ARG	Juan Priano
—	MF	(Argentina) ARG	Emilio Bonatti
—	MF	(Argentina) ARG	Alberto J. Penney
—	MF	(Argentina) ARG	Manuel Feijóo

No.	Pos.	Nation	Player
—	MF	(Argentina) ARG	Guillermo Ryan
—	MF	(Argentina) ARG	Marcelino Vergara
—	FW	(Argentina) ARG	Juan M. Eloiso
—	FW	(Argentina) ARG	Arturo P. Penney
—	FW	(Spain) ESP	Rafael Pratts
—	FW	(Argentina) ARG	José M. Farenga
—	FW	(Argentina) ARG	P. Chinoli
—	FW	(Argentina) ARG	Alfredo Canevaro

== Championship format and teams ==
The Segunda División championship was contested by 36 teams divided into four groups of nine teams each. Boca played in Group C with San Isidro II (Note: "II" indicates reserve team so the senior squad was already playing in Primera División. Contesting second or lower division tournaments with reserve players was a common practise in those years.), Gimnasia y Esgrima (BA), Belgrano A.C. II, Bernal, (Note: Club Atlético Bernal, wore white and purple horizontal hoops shirt.) Continental II (Note: Club Atlético Continental was a team established by former Atlanta players. Its shirt was vertical striped green and black), Royal, Villa Ballester, (Note: Club Sportivo Villa Ballester, currently disaffiliated but still active as a social club in Villa Ballester.) and La Plata F.C. (Note: Established in 1902, LPFC was Estudiantes' first official rival in March 1908. Not to be confused with reborn La Plata Fútbol Club, founded in 2000 by then Mayor of La Plata, Julio Alak.).

== Matches ==
= Won; = Drew; = Lost

=== Segunda División ===
==== Group C ====
3 May 1908 1	Belgrano A.C. II	1-3	Boca Juniors	Buenos Aires
		Report	Pratts; Eloíso	Stadium: Belgrano (Virrey del Pino y Superí)

10 May 1908 2	Boca Juniors	7–0	Bernal	Buenos Aires
	Pratts; Penney; Eloíso	Report		Stadium: Isla Demarchi

17 May 1908 3	Continental II	1–1	Boca Juniors	Buenos Aires
		Report	Pratts	Stadium: Continental

24 May 1908 4	Bernal	1–5	Boca Juniors	Bernal
		Report	Pratts; Farenga; Moltedo	Stadium: Bernal Stadium

31 May 1908 5	Boca Juniors	1–0	La Plata	Buenos Aires
	Pratts	Report		Stadium: Isla Demarchi

7 June 1908 6	Villa Ballester	1–2	Boca Juniors	Villa Ballester
		Report	Pratts; Farenga	Stadium: Roca y Victoria

28 June 1908 7	Boca Juniors	1–0	Belgrano A.C. II	Buenos Aires
	Moltedo	Report		Stadium: Isla Demarchi

9 July 1908 8	Boca Juniors	3–1	Continental II	Buenos Aires
	Pratts; Penney	Report		Stadium: Isla Demarchi

12 July 1908 9	Boca Juniors	w–o (Note: Qualified for the semifinals. After Royal withdrew the competition and Villa Ballester players did not attended the match, Boca was awarded the points (6 in total) on the three matches that weren't played.)	Royal
		Report

19 July 1908 10	San Isidro II	0–1	Boca Juniors	San Isidro
		Report	Bonfatti	Stadium: 25 de Mayo y R. Sánez Peña

26 July 1908 11	Boca Juniors	2–0	Gimnasia y Esgrima (BA)	Buenos Aires
	A.J. Penney; A.P. Penney	Report		Stadium: Isla Demarchi

30 August 1908 12	La Plata	2–2	Boca Juniors	La Plata
	Bavio; Carús	Report	Pratts	Stadium: Hipódromo de La Plata

13 September 1908 13	Boca Juniors	4–0	San Isidro II	Buenos Aires
	Pratts; Cerezo	Report		Stadium: Isla Demarchi

11 October 1908 14	Gimnasia y Esgrima (BA)	2–2	Boca Juniors	Buenos Aires
	Capellini; Lacove	Report	Pratts; Chinoli	Stadium: Estadio G.E.B.A.

25 October 1908 15	Boca Juniors	w–o	Royal
		Report

1 November 1908 16	Boca Juniors	w–o	Villa Ballester
		Report

==== Group C standings ====
Pos.	Team	Pts.	Pl.	W	D	L	Gf	Ga
1	Boca Juniors	29	16	13	3	0	34	10
2	La Plata	23	16	10	3	3	25	14
3	Continental II	18	16	8	2	6	15	9
4	Villa Ballester	18	14	8	2	4	31	17
5	Gimnasia y Esgrima (BA)	17	13	8	1	4	30	11
6	San Isidro II	13	12	6	1	5	24	16
7	Belgrano A.C. II	10	13	5	0	8	10	25
8	Bernal	4	16	2	0	14	8	65
9	Royal	0	16	0	0	16	0	11

==== Promotion playoff ====
6 December 1908
Semifinal

Boca Juniors	0–1	Racing Club
	Report	Frers 2'

Estadio G.E.B.A., Buenos Aires
Referee: Campbell

Suspended on 86'

Team details

Boca Juniors
Racing Club

GK	Juan De los Santos
DF	Marcelino Vergara
DF	Luis Cerezo
MF	Guillermo Ryan
MF	Alberto J. Penney
MF	Juan Priano
FW	Arturo P. Penney
FW	Pedro Moltado
FW	Rafael Pratts
FW	Juan M. Eloíso
FW	José M. Farenga

GK	Alfredo Lamoure
DF	Juan Seminario
DF	Alberto Mignaburu
DF	Pedro Viazzi
DF	Juan Ohaco
MF	Emilio Firpo
MF	Ignacio Oyarzábal
MF	Alberto Ohaco
FW	Modesto Alvear
FW	Pablo Frers
FW	Germán Winne

=== Copa Bullrich ===
Copa Bullrich was a domestic cup contested by teams in Segunda División. It was played under a single-elimination format. Boca Juniors was eliminated on the second round.

14 June First stage	Estudiantil Porteño	1–2	Boca Juniors	Ramos Mejía
	Negri 30'	Report	Priano 15'; Pratts 73'	Stadium: Estudiantil Porteño; Referee: Castro

5 July Second stage	Boca Juniors	0–5	Atlanta	Buenos Aires
		Report	Rodrìguez 2', 89'; Prandone 7'; Piaggio 53'; Bellinzona 65'	Stadium: Ferro C. Oeste; Referee: Buchanan

== Friendly matches ==
The match v Uruguayan club Universal became the first match played by Boca Juniors outside Argentina.

12 Jan Liga Albión	San Telmo	0–0	Boca Juniors	Villa Ballester
		Report		Stadium: Villa Ballester

5 Apr	Ferro Carril Oeste	0–4	Boca Juniors	Buenos Aires
		Report	Pratts; Penney; Farenga	Stadium: Ferro C. Oeste

12 Apr Liga Albión	San Telmo	1–4	Boca Juniors	Villa Ballester
	?	Report	?	Stadium: Villa Ballester; Referee: Giacomelli

2 Aug	Boca Juniors	2–1	River Plate	Buenos Aires
	Pratts	Report	?	Stadium: Dársena Sur

18 Oct	Universal	1–2	Boca Juniors	Montevideo
		Report	Pratts; A.J. Penney	Stadium: Parque Salvio

== Statistics ==
=== Players statistics ===
No.	Pos	Nat	Player	Total		Segunda División	
No.	Pos	Nat	Player	Apps	Goals	Apps	Goals
	GK	(Argentina) ARG	Juan De los Santos	14	0	14	0
	DF	(Uruguay) URU	Luis Cerezo	14	1	14	1
	DF	(Argentina) ARG	Marcelino Vergara	13	0	13	0
	MF	(Argentina) ARG	Alberto Juan Penney	13	1	13	1
	MF	(Argentina) ARG	Juan Priano	14	0	14	0
	MF	(Argentina) ARG	Guillermo Ryan	13	0	13	0
	FW	(Argentina) ARG	Juan Manuel Eloiso	13	2	13	2
	FW	(Argentina) ARG	Pedro Moltedo	14	2	14	2
	FW	(Argentina) ARG	Arturo Penney	13	3	13	3
	FW	(Argentina) ARG	Jose M. Cayetano Farenga	13	2	13	2
	FW	(Spain) ESP	Rafael Pratts	12	21	12	21
	MF	(Argentina) ARG	Emilio Bonatti	3	1	3	1
	FW	(Argentina) ARG	P. Chinoli	1	1	1	1
	FW	(Argentina) ARG	Alfredo Canevaro	1	0	1	0
	MF	(Argentina) ARG	Manuel Feijóo	1	0	1	0
	DF	(Argentina) ARG	Esteban Marcolino	1	0	1	0
	DF	(Argentina) ARG	Máximo Pieralini	1	0	1	0

- Source: https://www.historiadeboca.com.ar/segunda-division-1908/1908/1017.html
