= Jorge Comas (footballer) =

Argentine footballer

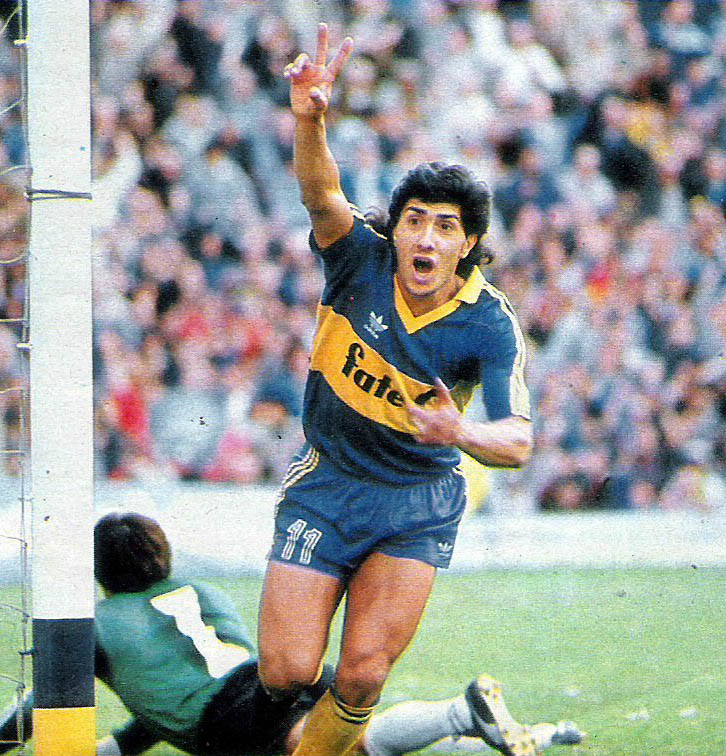
- Comas celebrating a goal he scored against River Plate in 1986

Personal information
- Full name: Jorge Alberto Comas Romero
- Date of birth: 9 June 1960 (age 66)
- Place of birth: Paraná, Argentina
- Position: Striker

Youth career
- Belgrano de Paraná

Senior career*
Years	Team	Apps	(Gls)
1980–1981	Colón de Santa Fe	48	(8)
1981–1985	Vélez Sársfield	166	(54)
1986–1989	Boca Juniors	113	(55)
1989–1994	Veracruz	178	(72)
1994	Colón de Santa Fe	?	(?)

International career
1988	Argentina	?	(?)
- * Club domestic league appearances and goals as of 22:46, 20 April 2009 (UTC)

Jorge Alberto Comas Romero (born 9 June 1960) is an Argentine former footballer who played as a striker, and is an Olympian, having taken part at the 1988 Summer Olympics. He played for football clubs in Argentina and Mexico and also played for the Argentina national football team.

== Club career ==
Comas (nicknamed "Comitas", a diminutive ) started his professional career with Colón de Santa Fe in 1980. After the club was relegated from the Primera División in 1981 he moved to Vélez Sársfield where he scored 54 goals in 166 games. He was the topscorer in 1985 Nacional championship with 12 goals.

In 1986 Comas joined Boca Juniors where he improved his goal scoring ratio, scoring 63 goals in 127 games in all competitions. Despite having played only 4 years for the Xeneize, he was the 2nd top scorer of 1986–87 season with 19 goals. Comas formed a remembered attacking line with right-winger Alfredo Graciani and centre-forward Jorge Rinaldi.

In 1989 Comas joined Mexican side Veracruz, where he became a fan favourite after being the top scorer for the 1989–90 season. He played for the "Tiburones Rojos" until 1994 when he returned to Argentina and his first club; Colón de Santa Fe.

After retiring as a player Comas has become a striking coach with several Mexican clubs including Celaya, León, Cruz Azul and Veracruz.

== International career ==
=== 1988 Summer Olympic Games ===
He played on the Argentine team which took part at the 1988 Summer Olympic Games.

== Personal life ==
His career in Mexico was documented by Duolingo to train Spanish speakers.
