= Pío Corcuera =

Argentine footballer

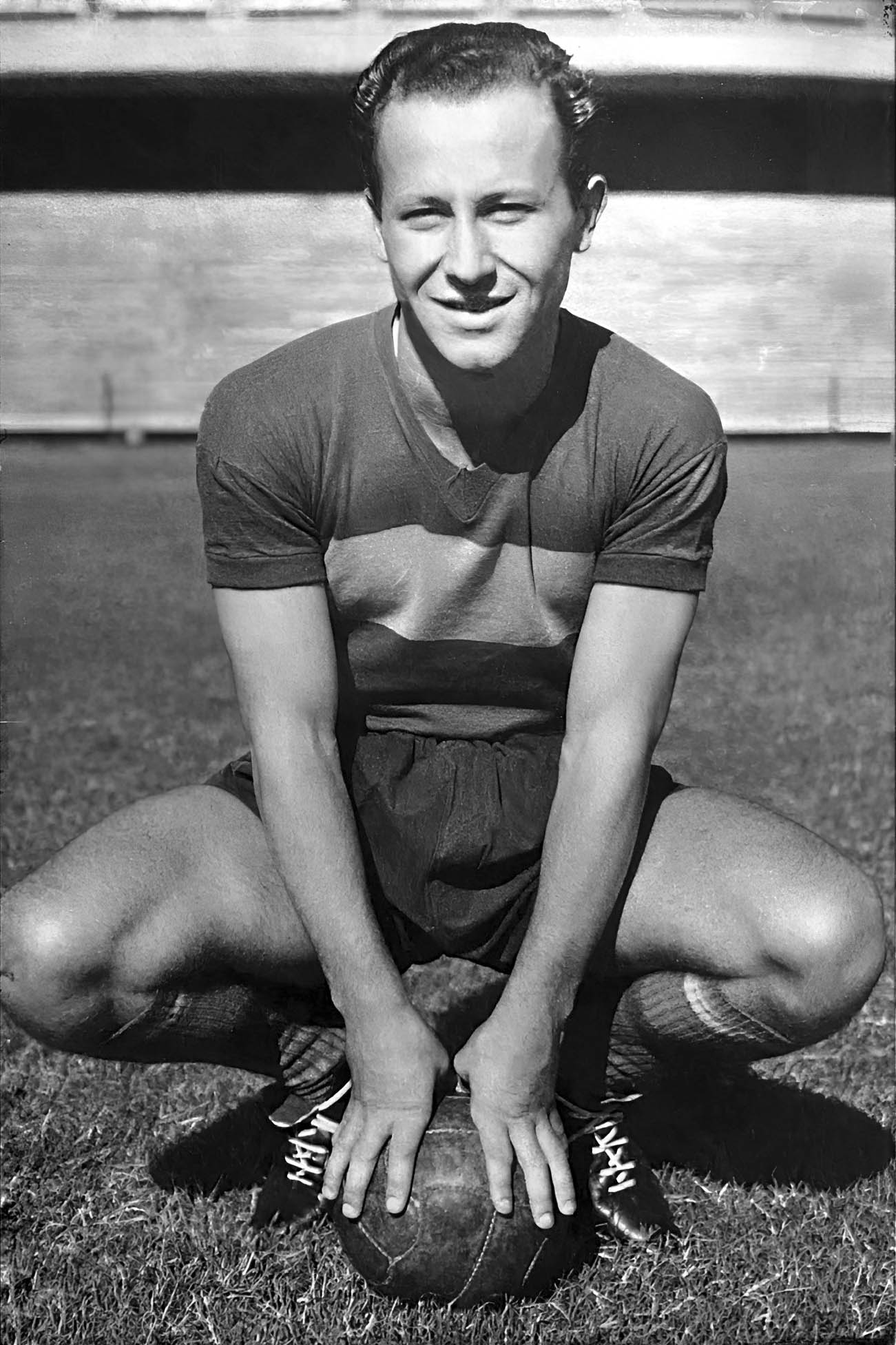
- Corcuera while playing for Boca Juniors

Personal information
- Full name: Pío Sixto Corcuera
- Date of birth: 17 July 1921
- Place of birth: Buenos Aires, Argentina
- Date of death: 22 November 2011 (aged 90)
- Position: Striker

Youth career
- Boca Juniors

Senior career*
Years	Team	Apps	(Gls)
1941–1948	Boca Juniors	187	(98)
1949–1951	Gimnasia de La Plata	65	(23)
- * Club domestic league appearances and goals as of May 2008

Pío Sixto Corcuera (17 July 1921 – 22 November 2011) was an Argentine football striker who played most of his career for Boca Juniors.

== Career ==
Born in Buenos Aires, Corcuera joined local Club Atlético Boca Juniors at age 17. He made his senior debut entering as a substitute for the injured Jaime Sarlanga in a league match against San Lorenzo de Almagro on 22 June 1941.

Corcuera won the Argentine championship with Boca Juniors during 1943 and 1944, participating in the two largest-winning margins for the club (11–1 against Club Atlético Tigre and 10–1 against Chacarita Juniors). He finished his career after three seasons with Gimnasia y Esgrima de La Plata, retiring in 1951 at age 29.

Nicknamed "El Cañoncito" (The little cannon) Corcuera won five titles with Boca, and can still be found on the all-time list of Boca Juniors topscorers.

== Titles ==
Season	Team	Title
1943	Boca Juniors	Primera División Argentina
1944	Boca Juniors	Primera División Argentina
1944	Boca Juniors	Copa Carlos Ibarguren
1946	Boca Juniors	Copa Competencia Británica
1946	Boca Juniors	Copa Comfraternidad
