= Copa Estímulo =

Argentine football cup competition

- Organiser(s): AFA
- Founded: 1920
- Abolished: 1926; 99 years ago (Note: Although many football historians state that there was a third edition of the Cup in 1929, the Association considered it as a Primera División championship instead of a national cup.)
- Region: Argentina
- Teams: 12 (1926)
- Last champions: Boca Juniors (1926)

The Copa Estímulo was an official Argentine football cup competition organized by the Argentine Football Association and first held in 1920. The tournament was contested twice between 1920 and 1926.

Although some versions state the cup had a third edition in 1929, it was indeed played under the 1929 Primera División season format (being Gimnasia y Esgrima (LP) the winner). The Association only officialized the 1920 and 1926 Copa Estímulo editions, considering the 1929 championship as a Primera División title.

== History ==
In 1920, the Argentina national team travelled to Chile to play the South American Championship held in that country therefore the Association interrupted the Primera División championship while the international competition was being played. With the purpose of keeping local teams active, the association created a new tournament to be played during the recess, named "Copa Estímulo". Ten teams took part of the competition, divided into two groups where teams played each other in a round-robin tournament. Before finishing the first stage, the cup was abandoned and never went back. Huracán (leading the group "Norte") was declared winner due to Banfield (first in the other zone) disaffiliated from the Football Association.

For the third edition, the trophy would be awarded by the 1929 Primera División champion. Unlike the previous season, the 35 teams participating were split into two groups in a round-robin tournament format. Teams finishing first of each zone at the end of the season played a final match, therefore Gimnasia y Esgrima de La Plata won the tournament after defeating Boca Juniors by 2–1.

== Champions ==
Ed.	Year	Champion	Score	Runner-up	Venue	City
1	1920	Huracán	– (Note: Won on points, Huracán placed 1st with 8 points in 5 games.)	Palermo	–	
2	1926	Boca Juniors	3–1	Sportivo Balcarce	San Lorenzo Stadium	Buenos Aires

=== Titles by team ===
Rank	Team	Titles	Years won
1	Huracán	1	1920
1	Boca Juniors	1	1926
