= Ángel Clemente Rojas =

Argentine footballer (born 1944)

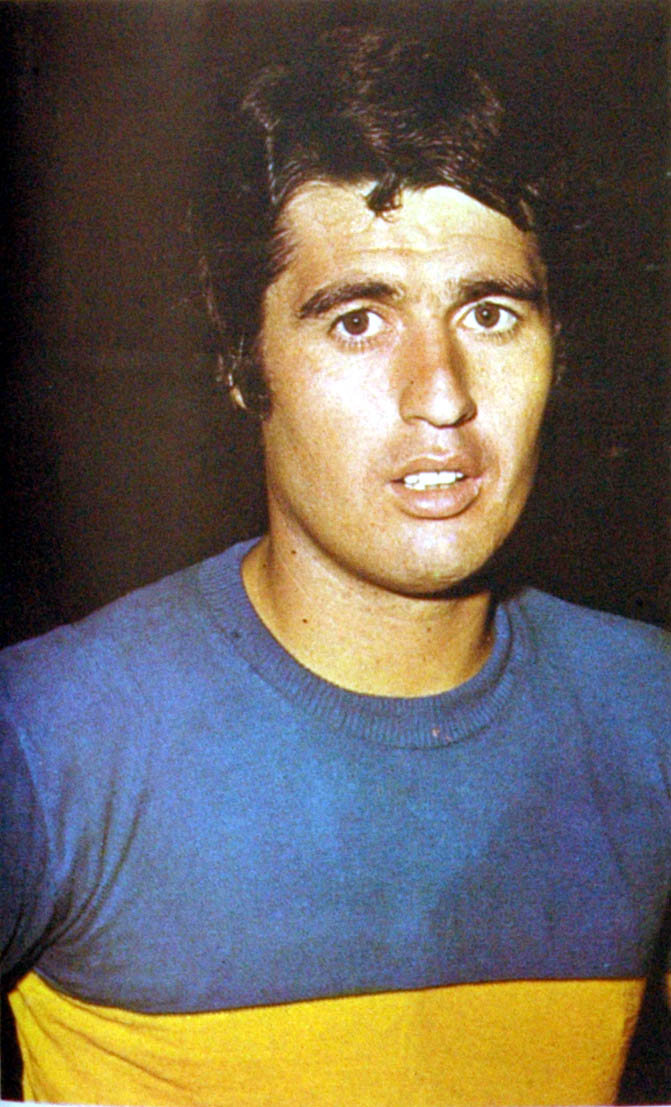
- Rojas in 1971

Personal information
- Full name: Ángel Clemente Rojas
- Date of birth: August 28, 1944 (age 82)
- Place of birth: Sarandí, Argentina
- Position: Striker

Youth career
- Belgrano de Sarandí
- Arsenal de Llavallol

Senior career*
Years	Team	Apps	(Gls)
1963–1971	Boca Juniors	192	(66)
1972–1973	Deportivo Municipal	?	(?)
1974	Racing Club	17	(1)
1975	Nueva Chicago	?	(?)
1976–1977	Lanús	?	(?)
1978	Argentino de Quilmes	?	(?)

International career
1965, 1968	Argentina	2	(1)
- * Club domestic league appearances and goals as of 24 October 2007

Ángel Clemente Rojas (born 28 August 1944 in Sarandí), nicknamed Rojitas, is a former Argentine footballer who played most of his career for Boca Juniors.

Rojas started his professional career in 1963 with Boca Juniors at the age of 18, he was hit by a major injury early in his career, a collision with an opposition player caused an Anterior cruciate ligament injury in 1963 kept him on the sidelines until August 1964. He returned to help Boca to claim the 1964 league championship. Boca followed it up with another championship in 1965, Rojas made a contribution of 12 goals, the most he ever scored for Boca in a league season.

In 1965, Rojas was selected to play for the Argentina national football team, he scored a goal on his debut against Chile, but only ever played one more game for La Selección.

In 1969, Boca won the Nacional championship and the Copa Argentina, Rojas played a part in both successes. In 1970, they won another Nacional, Rojas' 4th and last league title with the club.

Rojas left Boca Juniors at the end of 1971, having played 224 games and scored 78 goals in all competitions. In his eight years with the club, they won four league titles and an Argentine cup.

Between 1972 and 1973, Rojas played in Peru with Municipal.

In 1974, Rojas returned to Argentina to play for Racing Club, but he only scored one goal for the club in 17 appearances. He then had spells with Nueva Chicago and Club Atlético Lanús before playing out his career at Argentino de Quilmes in 1978.

== Titles ==
Boca Juniors

- Primera División (4): 1964, 1965, 1969 Nacional, 1970 Nacional
- Copa Argentina (1): 1969
