= 1928 in Argentine football =

Football in Argentina
- Season: 1928

1928 in Argentine football saw the Primera División league expanded to include 36 teams. They played in a single league with each team playing the other only once.

Huracán won its 4th. title in Primera.

== Primera División ==
El Porvenir and Argentino de Banfield returned to the top division after their runs on Primera B while Liberal Argentino and Porteño were relegated.

Pos	Team	Pts	G	W	D	L	Gf	Ga	Gd
1	Huracán	58	35	28	2	5	73	29	+44
2	Boca Juniors	57	35	28	1	6	100	17	+83
3	Estudiantes (LP)	53	35	25	3	7	89	39	+50
4	Independiente	52	35	22	8	5	71	27	+44
5	Racing Club	49	35	23	3	9	77	38	+39
6	San Lorenzo	47	35	21	5	9	63	38	+25
7	River Plate	46	35	20	6	9	68	42	+26
8	Quilmes	43	35	18	7	10	72	45	+27
9	Tigre	43	35	18	7	10	55	48	+7
10	Ferro Carril Oeste	41	35	19	3	13	78	51	+27
11	Banfield	40	35	15	10	10	63	49	+14
12	Chacarita Juniors	39	35	16	7	12	63	46	+17
13	Lanús	37	35	15	7	13	64	46	+18
14	Argentinos Juniors	36	35	13	10	12	45	40	+5
15	Estudiantil Porteño	34	35	11	12	12	56	52	+4
16	Almagro	34	35	12	10	13	44	53	-9
17	San Fernando	33	35	12	9	14	55	56	-1
18	Talleres (RE)	33	35	13	7	15	40	44	-4
19	Sportivo Palermo	33	35	11	11	13	45	52	-7
20	Sportivo Barracas	32	35	12	8	15	42	47	-5
21	Gimnasia y Esgrima (LP)	32	35	12	8	15	38	44	-6
22	Excursionistas	32	35	11	10	14	35	46	-11
23	El Porvenir	31	35	11	9	15	55	66	-11
24	Sportivo Buenos Aires	31	35	11	9	15	38	51	-13
25	Platense	29	35	10	9	16	40	50	-10
26	Argentino de Banfield	28	35	9	10	16	46	59	-13
27	Atlanta	27	35	11	5	19	36	60	-24
28	Estudiantes (BA)	27	35	11	5	19	37	62	-25
29	Barracas Central	27	35	9	9	17	42	74	-32
30	Argentino de Quilmes	26	35	10	6	19	58	68	-10
31	San Isidro	26	35	9	8	18	49	68	-19
32	Vélez Sarsfield	26	35	9	8	18	39	75	-36
33	Argentino del Sud	25	35	9	7	19	34	59	-25
34	Liberal Argentino	21	35	7	7	21	29	71	-42
35	Defensores de Belgrano	19	35	4	11	20	29	79	-50
36	Porteño	11	35	3	5	27	31	108	-77

Champion
Relegated

== Lower Divisions ==
=== Primera B ===
- Champion: Colegiales

=== Primera C ===
- Champion: Acassuso

== Argentina national team ==
The national team played the football tournament where finished 2nd. to Uruguay. Therefore Argentina was awarded the silver medal.

Argentina would later defeat Uruguay twice, winning the Copa Newton by 1-0 in Avellaneda and then the Copa Lipton after a 2-2 in Montevideo, where Argentina won the trophy as visiting team, according to tournament rules.

=== 1928 Summer Olympics ===
==== Finals ====
June 10, 1928
16:00

Uruguay	1-1	Argentina
Petrone 23'	Report	Ferreira 50'

Olympic Stadium (Amsterdam)
Attendance: 28.253
Referee: Johannes Mutters (NED)

June 13, 1928
19:00

Uruguay	2-1	Argentina
Figueroa 17'; Scarone 73'	Report	Monti 28'

Olympic Stadium (Amsterdam)
Attendance: 28.113
Referee: Johannes Mutters (NED)

=== Copa Newton ===
30 August 1928

Argentina	1-0	Uruguay
	Report

Avellaneda

=== Copa Lipton ===
21 September 1928

Argentina	2-2	Uruguay
	Report

Montevideo
