= Francisco Campana =

Argentine footballer

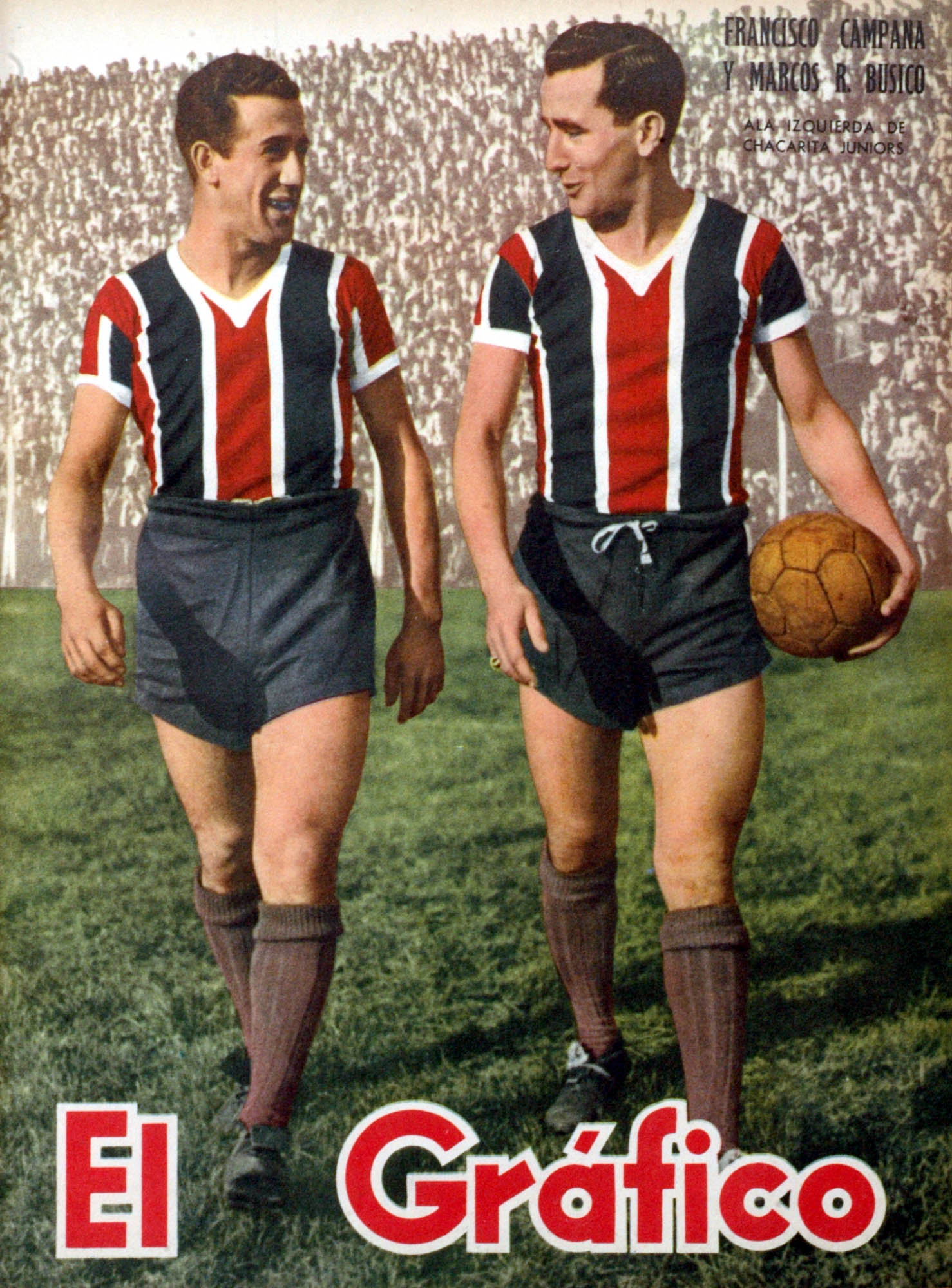

Personal information
- Date of birth: 9 May 1925
- Date of death: 23 January 1985 (aged 59)
- Position: Forward

International career
Years	Team	Apps	(Gls)
1947	Argentina	1	(0)

Francisco Campana (9 May 1925 – 23 January 1985) was an Argentine footballer. He played in one match for the Argentina national football team in 1947. He was also part of Argentina's squad for the 1947 South American Championship.
