= Jaime Sarlanga =

Argentine footballer and manager

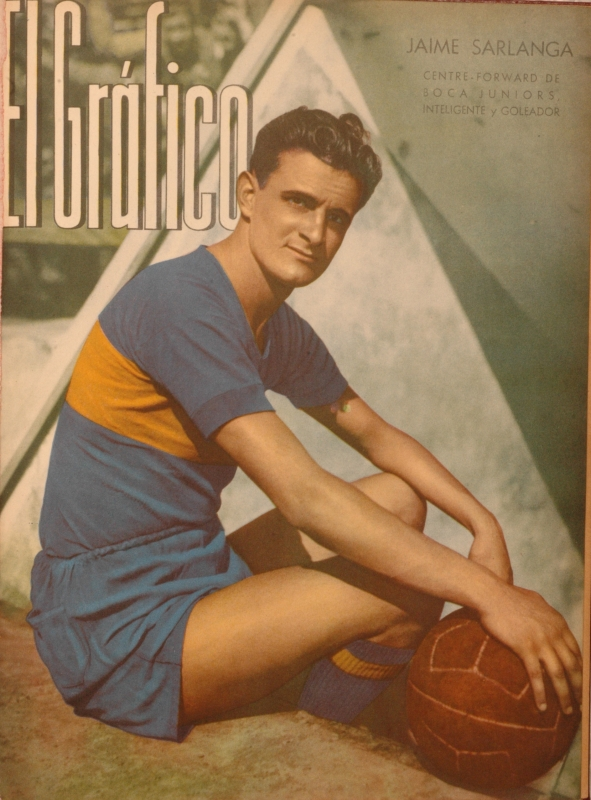
- Sarlanga with Boca Juniors in 1940.

Personal information
- Full name: Jaime Sarlanga
- Date of birth: February 24, 1916
- Place of birth: Tigre, Argentina
- Date of death: August 24, 1966 (aged 50)
- Position: Striker

Senior career*
Years	Team	Apps	(Gls)
1935–1936	Tigre	5	(3)
1937–1939	Ferro Carril Oeste	80	(47)
1940–1948	Boca Juniors	193	(115)
1949–1950	Gimnasia y Esgrima (LP)	24	(6)

International career
	Argentina	8	(5)

Managerial career
- 1955: Boca Juniors
- * Club domestic league appearances and goals as of June 2007

Jaime Sarlanga (February 24, 1916 – August 24, 1966) was an Argentine football forward. He played most of his career for Boca Juniors where he won 7 titles and scored 115 league goals, making him the 5th. highest goalscorer in club's history.

== Biography ==
=== Beginning ===
Sarlanga He was born in Tigre, Buenos Aires Province in 1916. He started playing football in local clubs Defensor and Sportivo Delta, and then joined Tigre where he played in the youth divisions until his debut in Primera División in 1935 vs. Independiente.

He played with Tigre for two seasons, until 1937 when he joined Ferro Carril Oeste, where he formed a powerful group of forwards along with Bernardo Gandulla, Raúl Emeal, Juan J. Maril and Luis Brognia. Sarlanga's elegant playing style soon caught the attention of fans and media, also remarking his skills as playmaker. In Ferro Sarlanga scored a total of 47 goals. As of present days, Sarlanga ranks 12th. amongst Ferro's 12 all-time topscorers.

=== Boca Juniors ===
Sarlanga was traded Boca Juniors in 1940, making his debut on August 18 in a match vs. Tigre (Boca won by 3–2), achieving a league title that same year. With the addition of Ferro's former partners Emeal and Gandulla, Boca would dispute the first places with Club Atlético River Plate's La Máquina during the 1940s.

Sarlanga was part of the attacking line along with Mario Boyé, Pío Corcuera, Severino Varela and Sánchez. That team was highly praised and still remembered as one of Boca Juniors' best teams ever. Sarlanga was topscorer for the team for 4 consecutive seasons from 1940 to 1943. On April 6, 1941, Sarlanga scored 6 goals in the 7–2 victory over Atlanta. In the last match against Ferro, Sarlanga scored 2 goals, giving Boca Juniors the victory that allowed the team to crown champion of the season.

In 1940 Sarlanga joined Boca Juniors, with which he won 3 league titles and 4 national cups. Sarlanga left the club in 1948, joining Gimnasia y Esgrima (LP) where he played until his retirement in 1950 at 34 years old.

In 1955 Sarlanga became Boca Juniors manager, replacing other historic player, Ernesto Lazzatti. Under his coaching, the squad finished 3rd to River Plate and Racing. being replaced by Mario Fortunato at the end of the season.

Sarlanga died in 1966 after a heart attack. He was 50 years old.

== Honours ==
=== Club ===
Boca Juniors

- Primera División (3): 1940, 1943, 1944
- Copa Ibarguren (2): 1940, 1944
- Copa de Competencia Británica (1): 1946
- Copa Escobar-Gerona (1): 1946
