= Hugo Curioni =

Argentine footballer

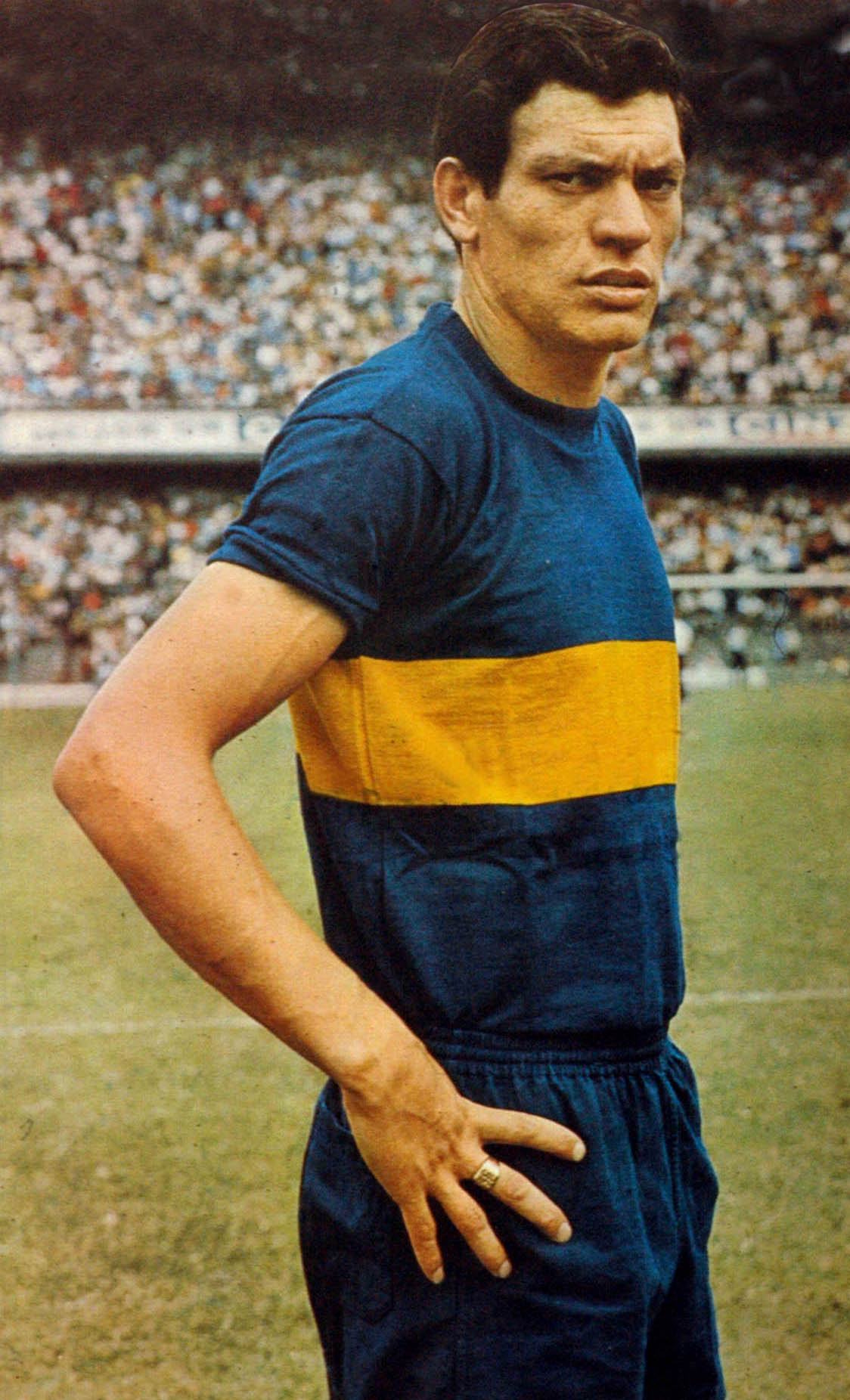
- Curioni with Boca Juniors in 1970

Personal information
- Full name: Hugo Alberto Curioni
- Date of birth: October 11, 1946 (age 80)
- Place of birth: General Cabrera, Córdoba, Argentina
- Position: Centre forward

Senior career*
Years	Team	Apps	(Gls)
1969	Instituto	10	(0)
1970–1973	Boca Juniors	135	(69)
1974–1975	Nantes	38	(24)
1975–1977	FC Metz	109	(59)
1978	Troyes	5	(1)
1978–1980	Montpellier	48	(21)
1980	Toluca		
1980	Gimnasia La Plata	26	(10)
- * Club domestic league appearances and goals

Hugo Alberto Curioni (born 11 October 1946) is an Argentine former footballer who played as a centre forward. He played professional football in Argentina, France and Mexico.

== Argentina ==
Curioni started his professional career with Instituto de Córdoba in 1969, he was soon spotted by Boca Juniors and signed for them in 1970. In his first season with the club he was part of the championship winning team. He was also equal topscorer in Metropolitano 1973 with Oscar Más and Ignacio Peña.

Curioni is fondly remembered by Boca fans for his goalscoring feats in the Superclásico derby against fierce rivals River Plate. He shares a record of scoring in six consecutive Superclásicos with Paulo Valentim and scored 7 in 11 games overall.

== France ==
Curioni was signed by Nantes and was the third highest scorer in the French league in 1974–1975.

In 1975 Curioni moved to FC Metz where he was third top scorer in 1975–1976 and 4th top scorer in 1976–1977. He then had spells with Montpellier and Troyes.

== Later career ==
Curioni had a spell in Mexico with Toluca and returned to Argentina in March 1980 to finish his career with Gimnasia de La Plata.

== Honours ==
Boca Juniors

- Argentine Primera División: 1970
