= Paulo Valentim =

Brazilian footballer (1933–1984)

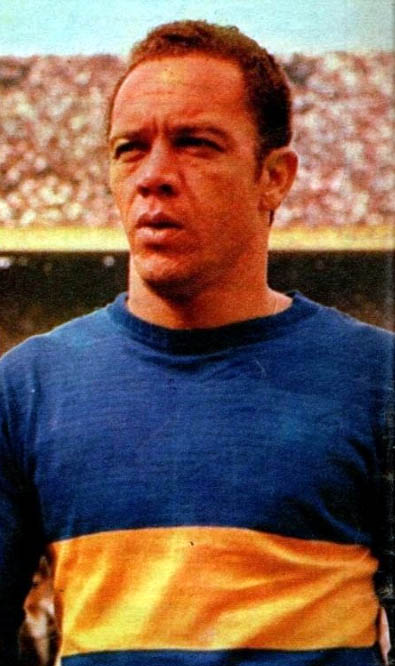
- Valentim with Boca Juniors

Personal information
- Full name: Paulo Angelo Valentim
- Date of birth: 20 November 1933
- Place of birth: Barra do Piraí, Brazil
- Date of death: 9 July 1984 (aged 50)
- Place of death: Buenos Aires, Argentina
- Position: Striker

Youth career
- 1947–1949: Central de Barra do Piraí
- 1949–1952: Guarani de Volta Redonda

Senior career*
| Years | Team | Apps | (Gls) |
| 1952–1954 | Guarani de Volta Redonda | | |
| 1954–1956 | Atlético Mineiro | 51 | (31) |
| 1956–1960 | Botafogo | 206 | (135) |
| 1960–1965 | Boca Juniors | 105 | (67) |
| 1965–1966 | São Paulo | 10 | (4) |
| 1966–1968 | Atlante | | |
| 1968 | Argentino de Quilmes | 4 | (0) |

International career
| 1959 | Brazil | 5 | (5) |
- * Club domestic league appearances and goals

Paulo Angelo Valentim (20 November 1933 – 9 July 1984) was a Brazilian professional footballer who played as a striker for clubs in Brazil, Argentina and Mexico.

== Career ==
Valentim came through the youth team of Guarani de Volta Redonda to make his first team debut in 1952. In 1954 he moved to Atlético Mineiro where he helped the team to win three consecutive state championships.

In 1956 he joined Botafogo where he played alongside legendary players like Garrincha, Jairzinho and Nílton Santos. He was called up to play for the Brazil national team and played alongside Pelé in the 1959 South American Championship in Argentina.

In 1960 Valentim moved to Argentina to play for Boca Juniors where he won two championships with the club in 1962 and 1964, being club top scorer on both occasions. He was also the clubs topscorer in 1960 and 1961. Valentim is fondly remembered by the Boca Juniors fans for the fact that he scored 10 goals in 7 Superclásico games against their fiercest rivals River Plate. He is still Boca's highest scoring player in games against River Plate.

In 1965 Valentim returned to Brazil to play for São Paulo before joining Atlante in Mexico and finishing his career with Argentino de Quilmes in the Argentine second division.

== Later life and death ==
After retiring from football Valentim stayed in Argentina where he worked as a youth coach. By the 1980s he was living in poverty, he contracted heart problems and hepatitis and died on 9 July 1984, at the age of 50.

== Honours ==
Atlético Mineiro

- Campeonato Mineiro: 1954, 1955, 1956

Botafogo

- Campeonato Carioca: 1957

Boca Juniors

- Argentine Primera División: 1962, 1964
