= Copa Suecia =

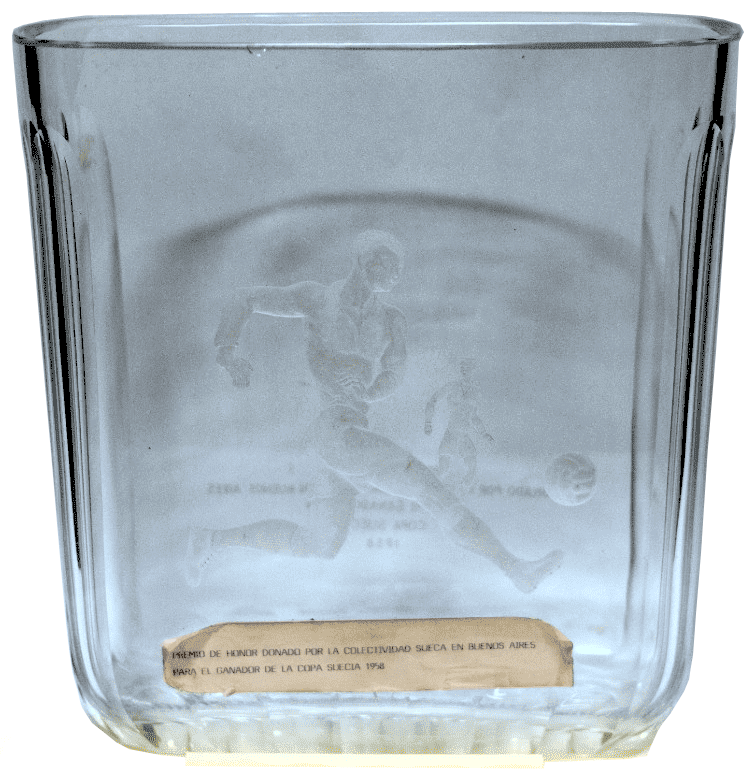
- The trophy awarded to champions
- Organiser(s): AFA
- Founded: 1958
- Abolished: 1960; 66 years ago
- Region: Argentina
- Teams: 16
- Related competitions: Primera División
- Last champions: Atlanta

The Copa Suecia (in English: Sweden Cup) was an official Argentine football cup competition held once from 1958 to 1960 by the Argentine Football Association (AFA). It was competed by clubs in the Argentine Primera División. Atlanta won the tournament in the final held in 1960.

== History ==
Given that the World Cup was held in faraway Sweden in 1958, the Argentine league competition was interrupted after the third round and it was not restarted until three months later. As a result, AFA organized a cup competition in order to keep the teams in readiness and also let the clubs receive some economic benefits throughout the prolonged intermission. The Swedish ambassador in Argentina, Carl-Herbert Borgenstierna, donated the trophy and hence the name of the tournament.

The 16 teams of the Primera División were divided into two groups (A and B), and each group played a round-robin. The top team from each group would contest a single-legged final. If two teams had the same number of points in a group, a single-legged play-off would be competed to determine the qualification.

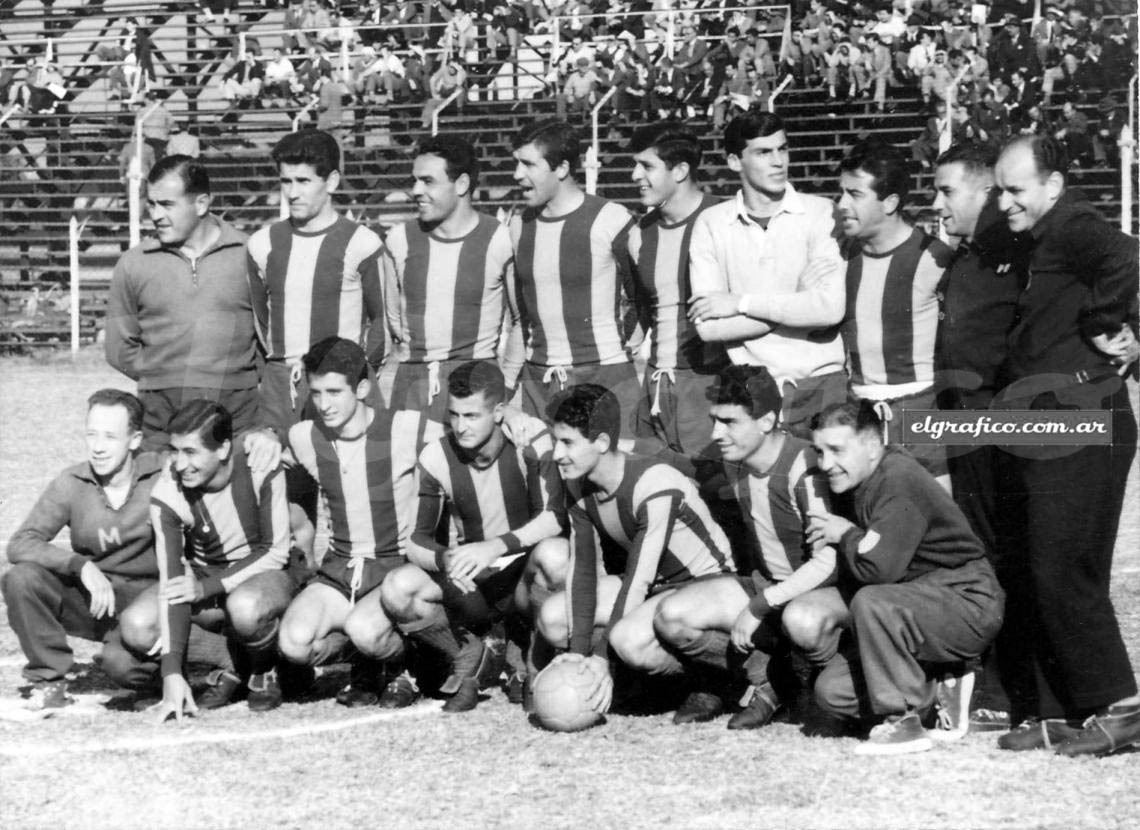
Team of Atlanta that beat Racing in the final

Atlanta started very well in this year by three consecutive wins in the league. It also made a strong debut in the Group B of the Copa Suecia by defeating River Plate 4–1. Eventually it was the top team of its group, having the same number of points with Rosario Central. A play-off was contested and Atlanta won by 1–0.

Racing Club was the qualified team in the Group A and they played the final in 1960. Atlanta won the match 3:1 and was crowned the champion. It remains the only official top flight tournament title in Atlanta's history. Moreover, it was the first time that one of the so-called "little teams" of Argentina won an official cup in the professional era, aside from the "Big Five" (River Plate, Boca Juniors, San Lorenzo de Almagro, Independiente, and Racing Club).

Initially, the tournament drew strong crowds. However, public interest declined soon due to various factors. The competition was harmed by the lack of commitment of some of the competing clubs that presented too many substitutes. Moreover, interest was lost due to the dismal performance of the Argentina national football team in World Cup 1958. Last but not least, once the Primera División was resumed, there was a lack of available match dates and the scheduling of the remaining part of the tournament became very difficult. As a result, the tournament became a prolongated competition, with some matches played in 1959 and the final was held in 1960, two years and nine days after the commencement.

== Group stage ==
=== Group A ===
Pos	Team	Pts	GP	W	D	L	GF	GA	GD
1	Racing	21	14	10	1	3	34	16	18
2	Newell's Old Boys	18	13	8	2	3	24	15	9
3	Estudiantes (LP)	15	14	5	5	4	27	22	5
4	Tigre	15	13	5	5	3	27	25	2
5	Huracán	13	14	4	5	5	23	27	-4
6	Vélez Sarsfield	13	14	3	7	4	25	30	-5
7	Boca Juniors	9	14	3	3	8	18	25	-7
8	Central Córdoba (R)	6	14	2	2	10	15	33	-18

Qualified to the final

=== Group B ===
Pos	Team	Pts	GP	W	D	L	GF	GA	GD
1	Atlanta	17	14	7	3	4	26	18	8
2	Rosario Central	17	14	8	1	5	33	29	4
3	Lanús	15	14	6	3	5	27	28	-1
4	Argentinos Juniors	15	14	6	3	5	30	26	4
5	Independiente	13	14	5	3	6	29	24	5
6	San Lorenzo	13	14	4	5	5	23	27	-4
7	River Plate	11	14	4	3	7	23	30	-7
8	Gimnasia y Esgrima (LP)	11	14	4	3	7	25	34	-9

Qualified to Tie breaking play-off

=== Tie breaking play-off ===
Team 1	Score	Team 2	Stadium	City
Rosario Central	0–1	Atlanta	Estadio Coloso del Parque	Rosario

Qualified to the final

== Final ==
=== Details ===
Copa Suecia Final
29 April 1960

Atlanta	3–1	Racing
Nuin 13'; Bellomo 41'; González 74'	Report	Sosa 62'

San Lorenzo Stadium, Buenos Aires
Attendance: 8,300
Referee: Duval Goicoechea

Atlanta	Racing

GK	(Argentina) Néstor Errea
DF	(Argentina) Óscar Claria
DF	(Argentina) Julio Nuin
MF	(Argentina) Norberto De Sanzo
MF	(Argentina) Carlos Griguol
MF	(Argentina) Rodolfo Betinotti
FW	(Argentina) Mario Griguol
FW	(Argentina) Alberto M. González
FW	(Argentina) Domingo Rodríguez
FW	(Argentina) Roberto Bellomo
FW	(Uruguay) Walter Roque
Manager:
(Argentina) Manuel Giúdice

GK	(Argentina) Osvaldo Negri
DF	(Argentina) Norberto Anido
DF	(Argentina) Juan Carlos Murúa
MF	(Argentina) Néstor De Vicente
MF	(Argentina) Vladislao Cap
MF	(Argentina) Julio Gianella
FW	(Argentina) Manuel Murúa
FW	(Argentina) José M. Ferrero
FW	(Argentina) Juan José Pizutti
FW	(Argentina) Rubén Sosa
FW	(Argentina) Raúl Belén
Manager:
(Argentina) José Della Torre

== Top goalscorer ==
Player	Goals	Club
(Argentina) Domingo L. Zabaleta	12	Lanús
