= Alfredo Graciani =

Argentine footballer (1965–2021)

Personal information
- Full name: Alfredo Oscar Graciani
- Date of birth: 6 January 1965
- Place of birth: Buenos Aires, Argentina
- Date of death: 21 April 2021 (aged 56)
- Place of death: Buenos Aires, Argentina
- Positions: Striker; right winger

Senior career*
Years	Team	Apps	(Gls)
1981–1984	Atlanta		
1985–1991	Boca Juniors	211	(75)
1992–1993	Racing Club	28	(7)
1993–1994	Boca Juniors	7	(0)
1994	Deportivo Español	9	(4)
1995–1996	Atlético Tucumán		
1996–1997	Argentinos Juniors		
1997	Lugano		
1998	Caracas FC		

International career
1983	Argentina U20	2	(0)
- * Club domestic league appearances and goals

Alfredo Oscar Graciani (6 January 1965 – 21 April 2021) was an Argentine footballer. He played for a number of clubs in Argentina and also played in Switzerland and Venezuela at the end of his playing career. He had a successful career at Boca Juniors, having played 250 matches for the club, and winning two titles. Nicknamed Alfil ("bishop" in chess, due to his diagonal movements on the pitch) and Bat, Graciani is ranked 14th. among the all-time leading scorers for Boca Juniors.

== Career ==
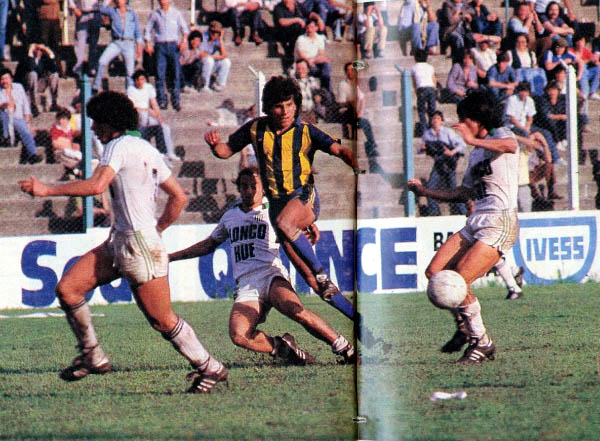
Graciani scoring for Atlanta v Banfield in 1983

Graciani started his playing career in the youth divisions of Atlanta, where his brother Néstor also played. He made his debut with the senior squad in 1981 v Gimnasia y Esgrima La Plata in Primera B, the second division of Argentine football by then. Atlanta coach Luis Artime sent him to the field on 80' substituting Carlos Landaburo. In 1983, Graciani was part of the team that won the Primera B championship promoting to Primera División. During his career at Atlanta, Graciani played a total of 89 matches, scoring 18 goals.

Graciani was also called up for the Argentina u20 team that played in the 1983 South American championship, qualifying for the 1983 World Championship where he was part of the roster.

In 1984 Graciani was signed by Boca Juniors, where he went on to become their leading goalscorer of the 1980s, winning two international titles with the club, the 1989 Supercopa Libertadores and 1990 Recopa Sudamericana. In 1992 Graciani joined Racing Club but returned to Boca Juniors in 1993. By the end of his Boca Juniors career he had played 250 games for the club in all competitions, scoring 83 goals.

In 1994 Graciani played for Deportivo Español before dropping down a division to play for Atlético Tucumán and then Argentinos Juniors in the Primera B Nacional. Three years later, he was signed by Swiss club Lugano, finishing his career playing for Venezuelan club Caracas in 1998.

After retirement as a player, Graciani went on to work as a football coach, being part of the coaching staff at Boca under Jorge José Benítez during the 2004–05 season.

Graciani died from a cardiac arrest in Buenos Aires on 21 April 2021.

== Titles ==
Atlanta

- Primera B: 1983

Boca Juniors

- Supercopa Libertadores: 1989
- Recopa Sudamericana: 1990

Argentinos Juniors

- Primera B Nacional: 1996–97

Argentina Youth

- South American Games: 1982, 1986
