= Castaño =

Castaño is a Spanish surname meaning "auburn".

- Blas Castaño (born 1998), Dominican baseball pitcher
- Brian Castaño (born 1989), Argentine boxer
- Carlos Castaño Gil (1965–2004), Colombian paramilitary leader, brother of Fidel and Vicente Castaño
- Carlos Castaño Panadero (born 1979), Spanish cyclist
- Catalina Castaño (born 1979), Colombian tennis player
- Cecilia Castaño (born 1953), Spanish academic
- Cristina Castaño (born 1978), Spanish actress, niece of Pepe Domingo Castaño
- Daniel Fernández del Castaño (born 1979), Argentine model
- Diego Castaño (born 1979), Argentine footballer
- Dolly Montoya Castaño (born 1948), Colombian professor and scientist
- Eliodoro Castaño Pedrosa (1933–2019), Moroccan-born Spanish footballer, known mononymously as Castaño
- Enrique Castaño (born 1993), Spanish footballer
- Érica Castaño (born 1985), Colombian para-athlete
- Ezequiel Castaño (born 1981), Argentine actor
- Fidel Castaño (1951–1994), Colombian drug lord and paramilitary leader, brother of Carlos Castaño Gil and Vicente Castaño
- Francisco Castaño (born 1972), Spanish footballer
- Francisco Sans Castaño (1868–1937), Spanish painter and engraver
- Gabriel Castaño (born 1997), Mexican swimmer
- Gaspar Castaño de Sosa (c. 1550–c. 1595), Portuguese colonial settler and converso
- Gastón Castaño (born 1985), Argentine footballer
- Gonzalo Fernández-Castaño (born 1980), Spanish golfer
- Héctor Castaño (born 1965), Colombian road cyclist
- Jorge Castaño (born 1981), Colombian wrestler
- Jorge Iván Castaño Rubio (1935–2025), Colombian bishop of the Roman Catholic Church
- Jose Castaño (1854–?), Spanish Franciscan friar
- Juan David Castaño Montoya (born 1990), Colombian singer better known by his stage name Llane
- Juanma Castaño (born 1977), Spanish sports commentator
- Kevin Castaño (born 2000), Colombian footballer
- Miguel Castaño (1883–1936), Spanish politician
- Mónica Castaño (born 1989), Colombian model
- Pepe Castaño (born 1999), Spanish footballer
- Pepe Domingo Castaño (1942–2023), Spanish radio and television presenter, singer and writer
- Raúl Castaño Escobar (born 1956), Colombian musician
- Santiago Castaño (born 1995), American soccer player
- Sergio Castaño (born 1982), Spanish footballer
- Stefany Castaño (born 1994), Colombian footballer
- Tony Castaño (1911–1989), Cuban baseball player
- Vicente Castaño (born 1957), also known as El Profe, Colombian paramilitary leader, brother of Carlos Castaño Gil and Fidel Castaño
- Yolanda Castaño (born 1977), Spanish painter and poet

== See also ==
- Castano (disambiguation)
- Castagno (disambiguation)
