= 2008 Torneo Apertura playoffs =

The 2008 Torneo Apertura playoffs were the series that determined the winner of 2008 Torneo Apertura of Argentine Primera División. The series were contested by Boca Juniors, San Lorenzo, and Tigre, in order to decide the Apertura champions after those clubs had finished tied on points (39 points in 19 matches played) at the end of the tournament. Although San Lorenzo finished the season with a better goal difference (+17) than Boca and Tigre (+12 each) the Argentine Football Association committee decided that playoffs should be held in order to crown a champion.

It was the 7th. league final contested by Boca Juniors (had won championships in 1923, 1970, 1976) and the 5th. played by San Lorenzo (having won the title in 1968 and 1972).

On the other side, it was the first final contested by Tigre in the top division of Argentine football.

The matches were played under a three-way playoff format. Boca Juniors and San Lorenzo finished both with 3 points each, but Boca Juniors' goal difference allowed them to won their 29th. league title.

This edition marked the second Primera División decider in history, following the Campeonato Nacional of 1968, where more than two teams participated.

== Qualified teams ==
Team	Previous finals app.
Boca Juniors	**1923**, 1929, **1970**, **1976**, 1990–91, 2006
San Lorenzo	1936, **1968**, 1971, **1972**
Tigre	(none)

Bold indicates winning years

== Venues ==
Buenos Aires	Avellaneda
José Amalfitani Stadium	Estadio Presidente Perón
Capacity: **49,540**	Capacity: **55,880**

== Matches ==
=== First round ===
2008 Torneo Apertura playoffs
December 17, 2008
Round 1

Tigre	1–2	San Lorenzo
Lázzaro 76'	Report	Barrientos 18'; Bergessio 20'

José Amalfitani Stadium, Buenos Aires
Referee: Saúl Laverni

**Tigre**	**San Lorenzo**

GK	1	(Argentina) Daniel Islas	Sent off (straight red)
DF	14	(Argentina) Pablo Jerez		(substituted off) (1)
DF	23	(Argentina) Norberto Paparatto
DF	3	(Argentina) Juan Carlos Blengio
DF	6	(Argentina) Rodolfo Arruabarrena
MF	17	(Argentina) Matías Giménez	Booked	(substituted off) (2)
MF	5	(Argentina) Diego Castaño	Booked
MF	18	(Argentina) Sebastián Rusculleda
MF	10	(Argentina) Martín Morel	Booked	(substituted off) (3)
FW	15	(Argentina) Leonel Altobelli
FW	7	(Argentina) Carlos Luna
Substitutes:
MF	15	(Uruguay) Sebastián Rosano		(substituted on) (1)
FW	9	(Argentina) Leandro Lázzaro		(substituted on) (2)
FW	11	(Paraguay) Néstor Ayala		(substituted on) (3)
GK	27	(Argentina) Luis Ardente
DF	29	(Argentina) Pablo Fontanello
DF	2	(Argentina) Damián Leyes
DF	4	(Argentina) José San Román
MF	8	(Argentina) Jonathan Blanco
Manager:
(Argentina) Diego Cagna

GK	1	(Argentina) Agustín Orión
DF	2	(Argentina) Adrián González
DF	20	(Argentina) Gastón Aguirre
DF	16	(Argentina) Nicolás Bianchi Arce
DF	11	(Paraguay) Aureliano Torres	Booked
MF	10	(Argentina) Pablo Barrientos
MF	28	(Argentina) Cristian Ledesma
MF	4	(Argentina) Juan Manuel Torres
MF	6	(Argentina) Santiago Solari		(substituted off) (1)
FW	7	(Argentina) Andrés Silvera		(substituted off) (2)
FW	15	(Argentina) Gonzalo Bergessio		(substituted off) (3
Substitutes:
FW	18	(Argentina) Santiago Hirsig		(substituted on) (1) (yellow card)
MF	19	(Argentina) Juan Carlos Menseguez		(substituted on) (2)
FW	22	(Argentina) Cristian G. Chávez		(substituted on) (2)
GK	12	(Argentina) Nereo Champagne
DF	30	(Argentina) Fernando Meza
DF	3	(Argentina) Germán Voboril
MF	32	(Argentina) Salvador Reynoso
Manager:
(Argentina) Miguel Ángel Russo

=== Second round ===
December 20, 2008
Round 2

San Lorenzo	1–3	Boca Juniors
Solari 61'	Report	Viatri 45'; Palacio 77'; Chávez 90'

Estadio Presidente Perón, Avellaneda
Referee: Héctor Baldassi

**San Lorenzo**	**Boca Juniors**

GK	1	(Argentina) Agustín Orión	Booked
DF	2	(Argentina) Adrián González	Booked
DF	20	(Argentina) Gastón Aguirre	(yellow card) (red card)
DF	16	(Argentina) Nicolás Bianchi Arce	Booked
DF	11	(Paraguay) Aureliano Torres
MF	10	(Argentina) Pablo Barrientos	Booked
MF	28	(Argentina) Cristian Ledesma
MF	4	(Argentina) Juan Manuel Torres	Booked
MF	6	(Argentina) Santiago Solari	(substituted off) (1)
FW	7	(Argentina) Andrés Silvera	(substituted off) (2)
FW	15	(Argentina) Gonzalo Bergessio	(yellow card) (red card)
Substitutes:
FW	18	(Argentina) Santiago Hirsig	(substituted on) (1) (yellow card)
FW	22	(Argentina) Cristian G. Chávez	(substituted on) (2)
GK	12	(Argentina) Nereo Champagne
DF	30	(Argentina) Fernando Meza
DF	3	(Argentina) Germán Voboril
MF	32	(Argentina) Salvador Reynoso
Manager:
(Argentina) Miguel Ángel Russo

GK	12	(Argentina) Javier García
DF	4	(Argentina) Hugo Ibarra
DF	2	(Paraguay) Julio César Cáceres
DF	6	(Argentina) Juan Forlín	(substituted off) (1)
DF	3	(Paraguay) Claudio Morel	Booked
MF	22	(Colombia) Fabián Vargas	(yellow card) (substituted off) (2)
MF	5	(Argentina) Sebastián Battaglia
MF	23	(Argentina) Jesús Dátolo	Booked
MF	10	(Argentina) Román Riquelme	Booked
FW	18	(Argentina) Luciano Figueroa	(substituted off) (3)
FW	27	(Argentina) Lucas Viatri
Substitutes:
DF	13	(Argentina) Facundo Roncaglia	(substituted on) (1) (yellow card)
MF	21	(Argentina) Cristian M. Chávez	(substituted on) (2)
FW	14	(Argentina) Rodrigo Palacio	(substituted on) (3) (yellow card)
GK	25	(Argentina) Josué Ayala
MF	15	(Uruguay) Álvaro González
DF	33	(Argentina) Ezequiel Muñoz
MF	28	(Argentina) Nicolás Gaitán
FW	17	(Argentina) Ricardo Noir
FW	7	(Argentina) Pablo Mouche
Manager:
(Argentina) Carlos Ischia

=== Third round ===
December 23, 2008
Round 3

Boca Juniors	0–1	Tigre
	Report	Lázzaro 68'

Estadio Presidente Perón, Avellaneda
Referee: Sergio Pezzotta

**Boca Juniors**	**Tigre**

GK	12	(Argentina) Javier García	(substituted off) 69'
DF	4	(Argentina) Hugo Ibarra
DF	13	(Argentina) Facundo Roncaglia	(yellow card) 33'
DF	2	(Paraguay) Julio César Cáceres
DF	3	(Paraguay) Claudio Morel
MF	21	(Argentina) Cristian Manuel Chávez
MF	5	(Argentina) Sebastián Battaglia
MF	23	(Argentina) Jesús Dátolo	(substituted off) 45'
MF	11	(Argentina) Leandro Gracián
FW	18	(Argentina) Luciano Figueroa	(substituted off) 55'
FW	27	(Argentina) Lucas Viatri
Substitutes:
GK	25	(Argentina) Josué Ayala	(substituted on) 69' (yellow card) 90'
MF	15	(Uruguay) Álvaro González	(substituted on) 45'
FW	14	(Argentina) Rodrigo Palacio	(substituted on) 55' (red card) 89'
DF	33	(Argentina) Ezequiel Muñoz
MF	24	(Argentina) Exequiel Benavídez
MF	28	(Argentina) Nicolás Gaitán
FW	17	(Argentina) Ricardo Noir
Manager:
(Argentina) Carlos Ischia

GK	1	(Argentina) Daniel Islas
DF	27	(Argentina) Luis Ardente
DF	14	(Argentina) Pablo Jerez
DF	23	(Argentina) Norberto Paparatto
DF	6	(Argentina) Rodolfo Arruabarrena	(substituted off) (1)
MF	15	(Uruguay) Sebastián Rosano	(substituted off) (2)
MF	17	(Argentina) Matías Giménez	(substituted off) (3)
MF	10	(Argentina) Martín Morel	Booked
MF	8	(Argentina) Jonathan Blanco
FW	7	(Argentina) Carlos Luna
FW	9	(Argentina) Leandro Lázzaro
Substitutes:
FW	31	(Argentina) Mauro Villegas	(substituted on) (1)
FW	15	(Argentina) Leonel Altobelli	(substituted on) (2) (yellow card)
FW	18	(Argentina) Sebastián Rusculleda	(substituted on) (3)
GK	21	(Argentina) Lucas Abud
DF	29	(Argentina) Pablo Fontanello
DF	2	(Argentina) Damián Leyes
DF	4	(Argentina) José San Román
Manager:
(Argentina) Diego Cagna

== Standings ==
Pos	Team	Pld	W	D	L	GF	GA	GD	Pts	Qualification
1	Boca Juniors	2	1	0	1	3	2	+1	**3**	Champion
2	Tigre	2	1	0	1	2	2	0	**3**	
3	San Lorenzo	2	1	0	1	3	4	−1	**3**	

Source: RSSSF
Rules for classification: Rules for classification: 1st points; 2nd goal difference; 3rd goals scored; 4th head-to-head points; 5th head-to-head goal difference; 6th head-to-head goals scored.
