= 1990–91 Primera División finals =

- Event: 1990–91 Argentine Primera División
Newell's Old Boys	Boca Juniors
1	1
- (on aggregate). Newell's won 3–1 on penalties

First leg
Newell's Old Boys	Boca Juniors
1	0
- Date: 6 Jul 1991
- Venue: Gigante de Arroyito, Rosario
- Referee: Crespi

Second leg
Boca Juniors	Newell's Old Boys
1	0
- Date: 9 Jul 1991
- Venue: La Bombonera, Buenos Aires
- Referee: Francisco Lamolina

The 1990–91 Argentine Primera División finals were the matches to define the 1990–91 season of Argentine Primera División. It was played between Newell's Old Boys (winners of 1990 Apertura) and Boca Juniors (winners of 1991 Clausura).

The 1990–91 season was the first played under the Apertura and Clausura format, a single round-robin tournament format that lasted for several years in Primera División. Both finalists played a two-legged tie series in order to decide the champion of the whole season.

It was the 5th. league final contested by Boca Juniors after 1923 (won a four-matches series v Huracán) and 1929 (lost v Gimnasia y Esgrima La Plata), 1970, and 1976. On the other hand, it was the 1st league final played by Newell's Old Boys.

The matches were held in the Estadio Gigante de Arroyito, and La Bombonera. Newell's won their 3rd. league title after defeating Boca Juniors 3–1 on penalties.

== Qualified teams ==
Team	Qualification	Previous finals app.
Newell's Old Boys	1990 Apertura winners	(none)
Boca Juniors	1991 Clausura winners	**1923**, 1929, **1970**, **1976**

Bold indicates winning years

== Venues ==
Rosario	Buenos Aires
Gigante de Arroyito Stadium	La Bombonera
Capacity: **46,955**	Capacity: **57,200**

== Background ==
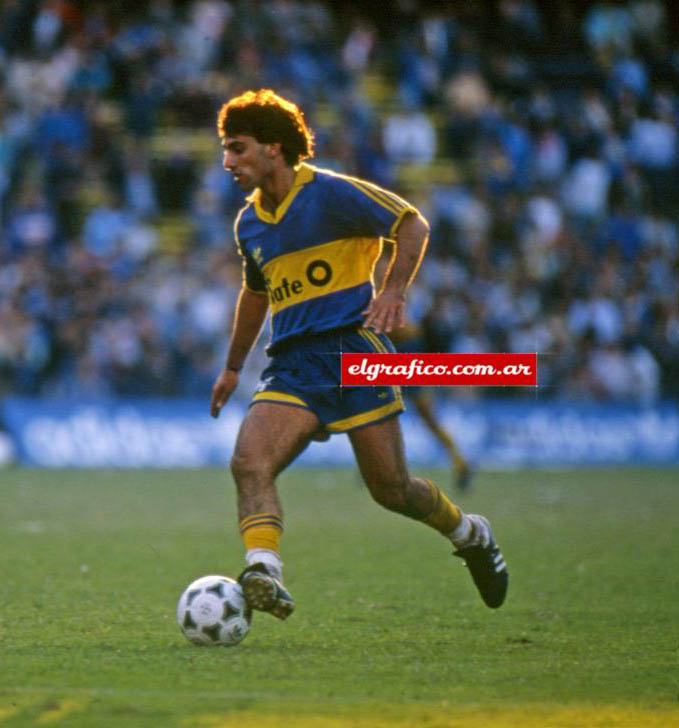
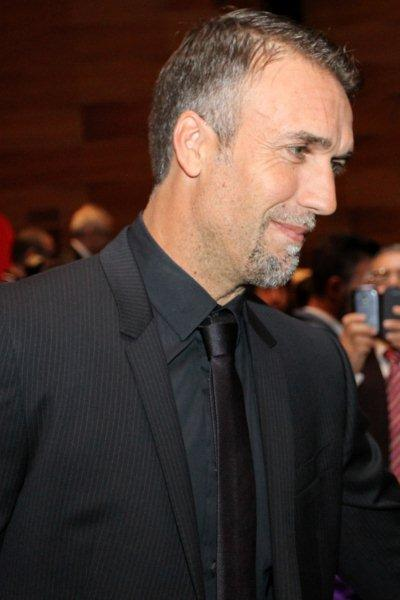
Diego Latorre (left) and Gabriel Batistuta, keyplayers of Boca Juniors in the regular season. None of them could play the finals

Boca Juniors and Newell's Old Boys had already played a decisive match when both teams met in the 1986 Liguilla Pre-Libertadores final. The Liguilla was a small tournament played by the best placed teams of both, Primera División and regional Torneo del Interior, in order to qualify a second Argentine representative to Copa Libertadores. In the 1986 edition, Boca Juniors defeated Newell's 4–3 on aggregate. Therefore Boca Juniors was the 2nd. team qualified to the 1986 Copa Libertadores.

Diego Latorre and Gabriel Batistuta had been the most notable players for Boca Juniors during the 1991 Clausura, when they formed one of the most notable offensive teams in the history of the club. Boca had finished the tournament unbeaten, with 13 wins and 6 draws out of 19 matches played.

Nevertheless, after both players were called up to play for Argentina national football team in the 1991 Copa America, they could not play the series with Boca Juniors. As replacements, the club hired midfielder Gerardo Reinoso and Brazilian striker Renato Gaúcho, just to play those two matches. On the other side, Newell's players Darío Franco and Fernando Gamboa were also called up for Argentina so they could not play the finals with Newell's.

== Matches ==
=== First leg ===
1990–91 Primera División Final
6 July 1991
First leg

Newell's Old Boys	1–0	Boca Juniors
Berizzo 47'	Report

Gigante de Arroyito, Rosario
Referee: Juan C. Crespi

**Newell's O.B.**	**Boca Juniors**

GK	1	(Argentina) Norberto Scoponi
DF	4	(Argentina) Eduardo Berizzo
DF	2	(Argentina) Mauricio Pochettino
DF	6	(Argentina) Fabián Garfagnoli
DF	3	(Argentina) Miguel Fullana
DF	10	(Argentina) Julio Saldaña
MF	5	(Argentina) Juan Manuel Llop
MF	8	(Argentina) Gerardo Martino (c)
MF	7	(Argentina) Julio Zamora	(substituted off) 79'
FW	9	(Argentina) Ariel Cozzoni
FW	11	(Argentina) Cristian Domizzi	(substituted off) 79'
Substitutes:
MF		(Argentina) Juan C. Roldán	(substituted on) 79'
FW		(Argentina) Ariel Boldrini	(substituted on) 79'
GK		(Argentina) Carlos A. Panciroli
DF		(Argentina) Gustavo Raggio
MF		(Argentina) Ricardo Lunari
Manager:
(Argentina) Marcelo Bielsa

GK	1	(Colombia) Carlos Navarro Montoya (c)
DF	4	(Argentina) Diego Soñora
DF	2	(Argentina) Juan Simón
DF	6	(Argentina) Enrique Hrabina
DF	3	(Argentina) Carlos Moya
MF	8	(Argentina) Walter Pico
MF	5	(Argentina) Blas Giunta	Booked
MF	10	(Argentina) Carlos Tapia
FW	7	(Argentina) Alfredo Graciani		(substituted off) 59'
FW	9	(Brazil) Gaúcho
FW	11	(Argentina) Gerardo Reinoso
Substitutes:
FW		(Argentina) Antonio Apud		(substituted on) 59'
GK		(Argentina) Esteban Pogany
DF		(Argentina) Ivar Stafuza
DF		(Argentina) Víctor Marchesini
DF		(Argentina) Claudio Rodríguez
Manager:
(Uruguay) Oscar Tabárez

=== Second leg ===
9 July 1991
Second leg

Boca Juniors	1–0 (a.e.t.)	Newell's Old Boys
Reinoso 81'	Report
Penalties
Graciani (penalty missed); C. Rodríguez (penalty missed); Giunta (penalty scored); Pico (penalty missed)	1–3	(penalty scored) Berizzo; (penalty scored) Llop; (penalty scored) Zamora

La Bombonera, Buenos Aires
Referee: Francisco Lamolina

**Boca Juniors**	**Newell's O.B.**

GK	1	(Colombia) Carlos Navarro Montoya (c)
DF	4	(Argentina) Diego Soñora	Booked
DF	2	(Argentina) Juan Simón	(red card) 100'
DF	6	(Argentina) Enrique Hrabina
DF	3	(Argentina) Carlos Moya	(yellow card) (substituted off) 68'
MF	8	(Argentina) Walter Pico
MF	5	(Argentina) Blas Giunta
MF	10	(Argentina) Carlos Tapia
FW	7	(Argentina) Alfredo Graciani
FW	9	(Brazil) Gaúcho	(substituted off) 78'
FW	11	(Argentina) Gerardo Reinoso
Substitutes:
FW		(Argentina) Antonio Apud	(substituted on) 68'
FW		(Argentina) Claudio Rodríguez	(substituted on) 78'
GK		(Argentina) Esteban Pogany
DF		(Argentina) Ivar Stafuza
DF		(Argentina) Víctor Marchesini
Manager:
(Uruguay) Oscar Tabárez

GK	1	(Argentina) Norberto Scoponi
DF	4	(Argentina) Eduardo Berizzo
DF	2	(Argentina) Mauricio Pochettino
DF	6	(Argentina) Fabián Garfagnoli
DF	3	(Argentina) Miguel Fullana
DF	10	(Argentina) Julio Saldaña
MF	5	(Argentina) Juan Manuel Llop
MF	8	(Argentina) Gerardo Martino (c)	(substituted off) 38'
MF	7	(Argentina) Julio Zamora
FW	9	(Argentina) Ariel Cozzoni	(substituted off) 91'
FW	11	(Argentina) Cristian Domizzi
Substitutes:
MF		(Argentina) Juan C. Roldán	(substituted on) 38'
FW		(Argentina) Ariel Boldrini	(substituted on) 91'
GK		(Argentina) Carlos A. Panciroli
DF		(Argentina) Diego Cerro
MF		(Argentina) Ricardo Lunari
Manager:
(Argentina) Marcelo Bielsa

== Aftermath ==
Newell's and Boca Juniors had celebrated the 1990 Clausura and 1991 Apertura as individual titles for them, although in June 1991 the AFA's Executive Committee decided (with all the PD clubs agreeing to the decision) that the 1990–91 season would have only one champion so a final would be conducted in order to decide a winner of the season.

The controversy caused AFA to recognise Apertura and Clausura tournaments as individual (and official) titles for their winners. From then on (starting with the 1991–92 season), winners of the following editions were recognised as official champions with no need to play a final.

According to that, Boca Juniors have claimed the 1991 Apertura be recognised as another league title for the club, as AFA did with the titles win in 1936 (the first season to be split into two tournaments, "Copa Campeonato" and "Copa de Honor") by San Lorenzo and River Plate). Both teams played a final (named "Copa de Oro") to define the champion of the season. In June 2013 (77 years after the match was played) AFA cited on its website the "Copa Campeonato" as a league title for River Plate. The "Copa de Honor" was also included as a league title for San Lorenzo de Almagro.
