= Apertura and Clausura in Argentine football =

Round-robin tournament format

The Apertura and Clausura system is a single round-robin tournament format used for the Argentine Primera División championships. Introduced in 1990–91, it lasted until the 2012–13 season when it was replaced by the "Inicial and Final", which were similar to the previous format.

The Apertura and Clausura championships were reinstated in the 2025 season.

== History ==
The Apertura and Clausura format was introduced in 1990–91, with 20 teams contesting the season which was divided into two tournaments. "Apertura" ("opening") championship which opened the season and was contested in the second half of the calendar year, and "Clausura" ("closing") championship that closed the season and was played in the first half of the following year. Each Apertura or Clausura consisted of a single round-robin tournament of 19 rounds, and there were 10 matches per round.

Nevertheless the opening season brought a big controversy so Newell's Old Boys (1990 Clausura) and Boca Juniors (1991 Apertura) had celebrated their respective titles, although in June 1991 the AFA's Executive Committee decided (with all the PD clubs agreeing to the decision) that the 1990–91 season would have only one champion so a final would be conducted in order to decide a winner of the season. The finals were won by Newell's, who were crowned as the only champion of the entire season.

The controversy caused AFA to recognise Apertura and Clausura tournaments as individual (and official) titles for their winners. From then on (starting with the 1991–92 season), winners of the following editions were recognised as official champions with no need to play a final.

Boca Juniors have claimed the 1991 Apertura be recognised as another league title for the club, as AFA did with the titles win in 1936 (the first season to be split into two tournaments, "Copa Campeonato" and "Copa de Honor") by San Lorenzo and River Plate). Both teams played a final (named "Copa de Oro") to define the champion of the season. In June 2013 (77 years after the match was played) AFA cited on its website the "Copa Campeonato" as a league title for River Plate. The "Copa de Honor" was also included as a league title for San Lorenzo de Almagro.

Between the 1991–92 season and the 1994–95 seasons, the league used the old two points for a win system. From the 1995–96 season the Argentine Association adopted the 3 points for a win system.

The Apertura and Clausura championships were reinstated in the 2025 season.

== List of champions ==
PD season	Apertura		Clausura	
PD season	Year	Champion	Year	Champion
1990–91	1990	Newell's Old Boys (0) (Note: Despite having won their respective championships, in June 1991 AFA decided that the season would have one champion only, forcing Boca and Newell's to play a two-legged final in order to crown a champion.)	1991	Boca Juniors (0)
1991–92	1991	River Plate (1)	1992	Newell's Old Boys (1)
1992–93	1992	Boca Juniors (1)	1993	Vélez Sarsfield (1)
1993–94	1993	River Plate (2)	1994	Independiente (1)
1994–95	1994	River Plate (3)	1995	San Lorenzo (1)
1995–96	1995	Vélez Sarsfield (1)	1996	Vélez Sarsfield (2)
1996–97	1996	River Plate (4)	1997	River Plate (1)
1997–98	1997	River Plate (5)	1998	Vélez Sarsfield (3)
1998–99	1998	Boca Juniors (2)	1999	Boca Juniors (1)
1999–00	1999	River Plate (6)	2000	River Plate (2)
2000–01	2000	Boca Juniors (3)	2001	San Lorenzo (2)
2001–02	2001	Racing (1)	2002	River Plate (3)
2002–03	2002	Independiente (1)	2003	River Plate (4)
2003–04	2003	Boca Juniors (4)	2004	River Plate (5)
2004–05	2004	Newell's Old Boys (1)	2005	Vélez Sarsfield (4)
2005–06	2005	Boca Juniors (5)	2006	Boca Juniors (1)
2006–07	2006	Estudiantes (LP) (1) (Note: Estudiantes LP defeated Boca Juniors in a championship decider, after the two teams finished level on points.)	2007	San Lorenzo (3)
2007–08	2007	Lanús (1)	2008	River Plate (6)
2008–09	2008	Boca Juniors (6) (Note: Boca Juniors defeated Tigre and San Lorenzo in a 3 way championship playoff.)	2009	Vélez Sarsfield (5)
2009–10	2009	Banfield (1)	2010	Argentinos Juniors (1)
2010–11	2010	Estudiantes (LP) (2)	2011	Vélez Sarsfield (6)
2011–12	2011	Boca Juniors (7)	2012	Arsenal (1)
2025	2025	Platense (1)	2025	Estudiantes (LP) (1)
2026	2026	Belgrano (C) (1)	2026	TBD

== Titles by team ==
Club	Season championships		Total won
Club	Apertura	Clausura	Total won
River Plate	6	6	12
Boca Juniors	7	2	9
Vélez Sarsfield	1	6	7
San Lorenzo	0	3	3
Independiente	1	1	2
Newell's Old Boys	1	1	2
Estudiantes (LP)	2	1	3
Racing	1	0	1
Lanús	1	0	1
Banfield	1	0	1
Argentinos Juniors	0	1	1
Arsenal	0	1	1
Platense	1	0	1
Belgrano (C)	1	0	1

== See also ==
- Apertura and Clausura
- Argentine Primera División
- Football in Argentina
