= Castaño (disambiguation) =

Castaño is a surname.

Castaño may also refer to:

- Castaño (peak), highest point in the Sierra de Aracena, Spain
- Castaño (bakery), a large Chilean bakery

== See also ==
- Castano (disambiguation)
- Castagno (disambiguation)
