= Castana =

Castana may refer to a number of towns:

- Castana, Iowa, United States
- Castana, Lombardy, Italy

See also

- Chastana, the Western Satrap king
- Castano (disambiguation)
- Castagna (disambiguation)
