= 2006 Torneo Apertura Final =

2006 Torneo Apertura final
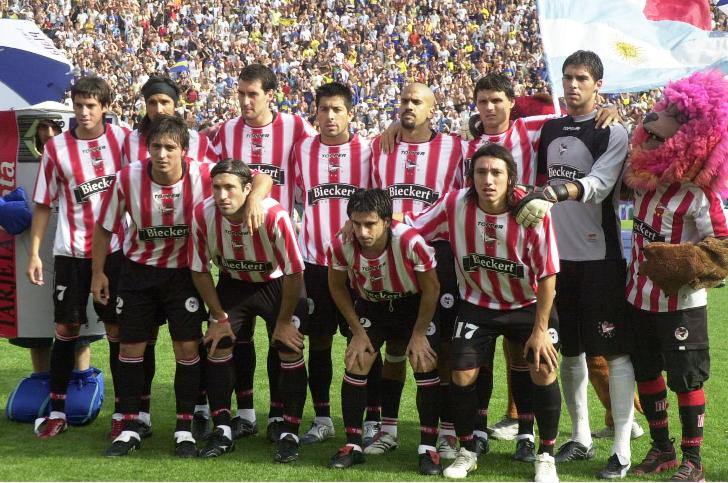
- Estudiantes de La Plata, champions
- Event: 2006 Torneo Apertura
Estudiantes (LP)	Boca Juniors
2	1
- Date: 13 December 2006
- Venue: José Amalfitani Stadium, Buenos Aires
- Referee: Sergio Pezzotta

The 2006 Torneo Apertura final was the tiebreaker match to define the 2006 Torneo Apertura of Argentine Primera División. It was played between Estudiantes de La Plata and Boca Juniors after both teams finished tied on points at the end of the season.

It was the 6th. league final contested by Boca Juniors after 1923 (won a four-matches series v Huracán) and 1929 (lost v Gimnasia y Esgrima La Plata), 1970, 1976, and 1990–91.

On the other hand, this was the 4th. league final played by Estudiantes, after the 1967, 1968, and 1983 finals, all of them won by team from La Plata.

The match was held in the José Amalfitani Stadium, home venue of C.A. Vélez Sarsfield. Estudiantes de La Plata won their 5th. league title after defeating Boca Juniors 2–1.

== Qualified teams ==
Team	Previous finals app.
Estudiantes (LP)	**1967**, **1968**, **1983**
Boca Juniors	**1923**, 1929, **1970**, **1976**, 1990–91

Bold indicates winning years

== Venue ==
Buenos Aires
José Amalfitani Stadium
Capacity: **49,540**
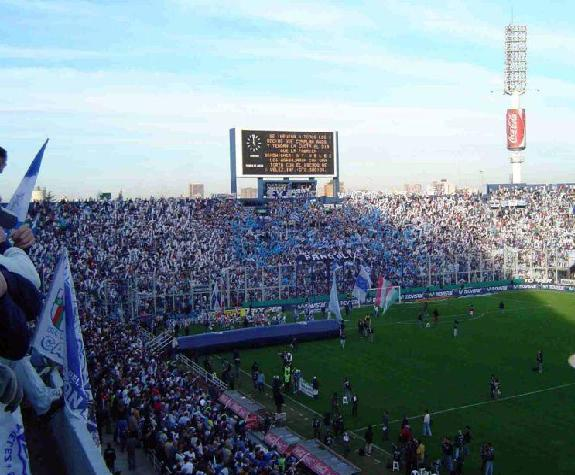

== Background ==
Boca Juniors had won the two previous league championships under the coaching of Alfio Basile (one of the most successful tenures of a manager in the club, having won five titles within one year and a half). Besides, some notable players such as Roberto Abbondanzieri and Federico Insúa had left the club after the 2006 FIFA World Cup. Boca Juniors had a great start in the 2006 Apertura, winning their first five matches (including an outstanding win over San Lorenzo 7–0 at Nuevo Gasómetro). Nevertheless, Basile left the club after that match, following a call from the AFA which requested him to become manager of the Argentina national team. Therefore, Basile started his second tenure on Argentina. To replace him, Boca Juniors hired Ricardo La Volpe, who debuted in the 7th. fixture. La Volpe had managed several Mexican clubs, and even the Mexico national team.

On the other hand, Estudiantes had started the tournament with some bad results, but the team coached by Diego Simeone and captained by idol Juan Sebastián Verón (who had returned to the club in June), recovered and started from the 8th. fixture, achieved 10 consecutive victories (including wins over three of the "big five" (Independiente, San Lorenzo, and River Plate) and an overwhelming 7–0 over arch-rival Gimnasia y Esgrima).

With only two fixtures remaining, Boca Juniors leaded the 2006 Apertura and only needed to earn one point (out of six) to win their ....th. league title. Nevertheless, Boca Juniors lost the remaining matches (0–1 vs Belgrano and 1–2 vs Lanús). Estudiantes' last results (a 2–2 draw with Argentinos Juniors and a 2–0 win over Arsenal de Sarandí) caused both teams finished equalled on points (44) at the end of the tournament.

Championship rules stated that a tiebreaker match had to be held in order to decide a champion. The match was scheduled to be played only 48 hours after the end of the season.

== Match ==
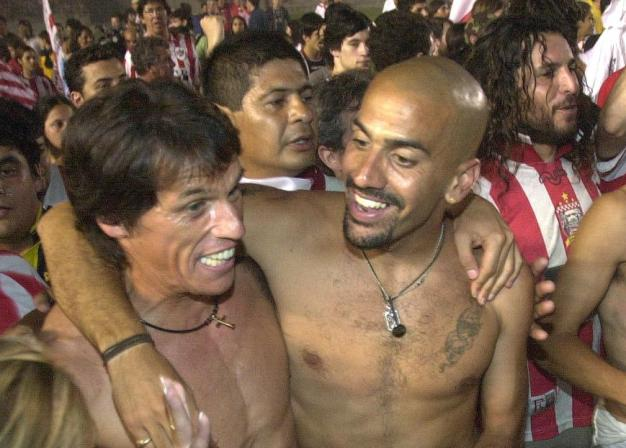
José Luis Calderón and Juan S. Verón celebrating the title

Boca Juniors took a quick advantage when Guillermo Barros Schelotto started the play and Pablo Ledesma assisted striker Martín Palermo for the first goal of the match. Before the end of the first half, referee Sergio Pezzotta sent off Pablo Álvarez and Ledesma, after a fight. In the second half, Estudiantes showed its superiority over Boca Juniors, which players retreated on the field in search of fighting back, although those few attempts were unsuccessful.

At 19', Estudiantes tied the score through a spectacular free kick by José Sosa that took Paraguayan goalkeeper Aldo Bobadilla by surprise. And 16' later, Mariano Pavone ran for the ball between two Boca Juniors defenders who could not stop him, scoring the second goal for the Pincha. After that, Estudiantes had other chances to score again in front of a rival with a weak state of mind.

=== Details ===
2006 Torneo Apertura Final
13 December 2006
Final

Estudiantes (LP)	2–1	Boca Juniors
Sosa 65'; Pavone 81'	Report	Palermo 5'

José Amalfitani Stadium, Buenos Aires
Referee: Sergio Pezzotta

**Estudiantes (LP)**	**Boca Juniors**

GK	21	(Argentina) Mariano Andújar
DF	14	(Argentina) Marcos Angeleri
DF	6	(Argentina) Agustín Alayes
DF	2	(Argentina) Pablo Álvarez (red card)
DF	19	(Argentina) Fernando Ortiz
MF	7	(Argentina) José Sosa	Substituted off
MF	20	(Argentina) Diego Galván	Substituted off
MF	22	(Argentina) Rodrigo Braña
MF	11	(Argentina) Juan Sebastián Verón
FW	16	(Argentina) Mariano Pavone
FW	17	(Argentina) Pablo Luguercio	Substituted off
Substitutes:
GK	25	(Argentina) Damián Albil
DF	3	(Argentina) Mauricio Casierra
DF	4	(Colombia) Josimar Mosquera
MF	24	(Argentina) Gonzalo Saucedo	Substituted on
MF	23	(Argentina) Leandro Benítez	Substituted on
FW	29	(Argentina) Pablo Piatti
FW	18	(Argentina) Ezequiel Maggiolo	Substituted on
Manager:
(Argentina) Diego Simeone

GK	1	(Paraguay) Aldo Bobadilla
DF	4	(Argentina) Hugo Ibarra
DF	22	(Argentina) Matías Cahais	Substituted off
DF	6	(Argentina) Daniel Díaz
DF	3	(Paraguay) Claudio Morel
MF	27	(Argentina) Pablo Ledesma (red card)
MF	5	(Argentina) Fernando Gago
MF	19	(Argentina) Nery Cardozo	Substituted off
FW	14	(Argentina) Rodrigo Palacio
FW	9	(Argentina) Martín Palermo
FW	7	(Argentina) Guillermo Barros Schelotto	Substituted off
Substitutes:
GK	25	(Argentina) Pablo Migliore
DF	15	(Argentina) José María Calvo	Substituted on
DF	28	(Argentina) Jonathan Maidana
MF	2	(Argentina) Matías Silvestre
MF	10	(Argentina) Guillermo Marino	Substituted on
FW	29	(Argentina) Andrés Franzoia	Substituted on
FW	16	(Argentina) Marcelo Delgado
FW	30	(Argentina) Mauro Boselli
Manager:
(Argentina) Ricardo La Volpe

== Aftermath ==
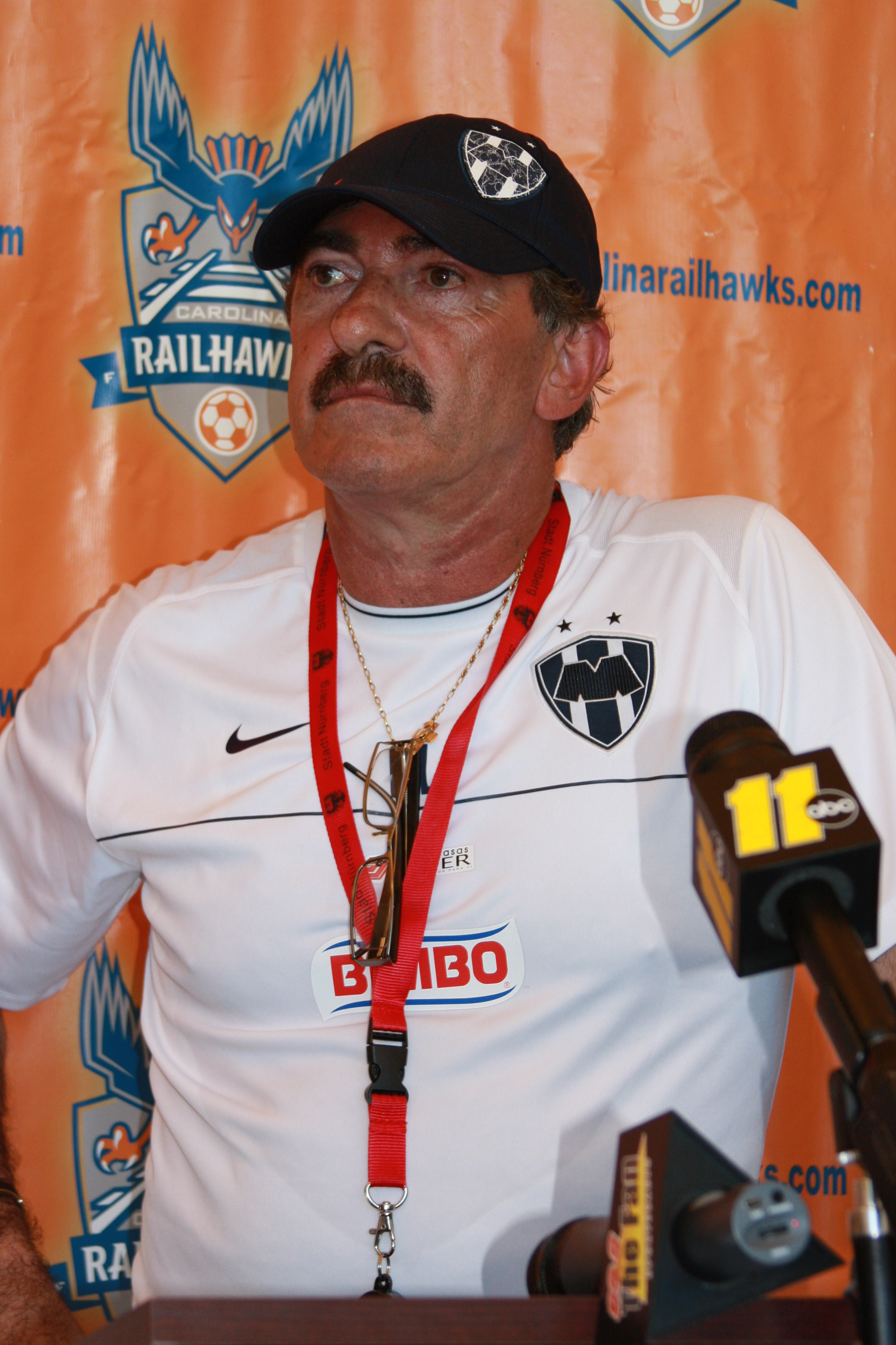
Boca Juniors manager Ricardo La Volpe was blamed by Boca Juniors fans

La Volpe (who had stated "if I lose this championship, I should leave" shortly before the championship ended) resigned as coach of Boca Juniors after the hard defeat. His brief tenure on Boca Juniors was a failure, considering the high possibilities of winning the title that had the team. by Boca Juniors supporters.

La Volpe only lasted three months in Boca Juniors, with 10 wins, 2 draws, and 5 losses. His tenure included controversies with both, the supporters and some of the most experienced players of the club.

In an interview given in 2016, La Volpe also blamed some players stating that they "left me very alone". He also told that "Guillermo (Barros Schelotto) did not get along with (Marcelo) Delgado", and highlighted the lack of leadership in the group of players. "A true leader brings the team together instead of dividing it". La Volpe also requested the interviewer to ask Martín Palermo what had happened in the match vs. Lanús.

In another interview in May 2022, La Volpe said that the final lost to Estudiantes de La Plata "left a bad taste in my mouth", showing he still felt frustrated after 16 years. La Volpe performed a self-criticism in 2023, blaming himself for the failure. He stated "...I think I was very stupid and I blame what I did in Boca. I came from a Mexican football where they already knew who La Volpe was and they listened to me. In Boca, players gestured when I talked to them".

One year later, La Volpe went further and said in an interview: "I felt like they (Boca Juniors players) looked down on me, but I wasn't going to fight back because on top of that, someone could beat me up. They talked down to me and called me "little Mexican". He also added "I was missing someone on my coaching staff who knew how to deal with those players".
