= Castagno =

Castagno may refer to:

- Andrea del Castagno, an Italian painter from Florence
- Dino Castagno, an Argentine professional footballer
- Castagno d'Andrea, a frazione of the comune of San Godenzo, in the Metropolitan City of Florence, Tuscany, Italy

== See also ==
- Castano (disambiguation)
- Castaño (disambiguation)
- Castagna (disambiguation)
