= 1970 Argentine Campeonato Nacional final =

1970 Campeonato Nacional final
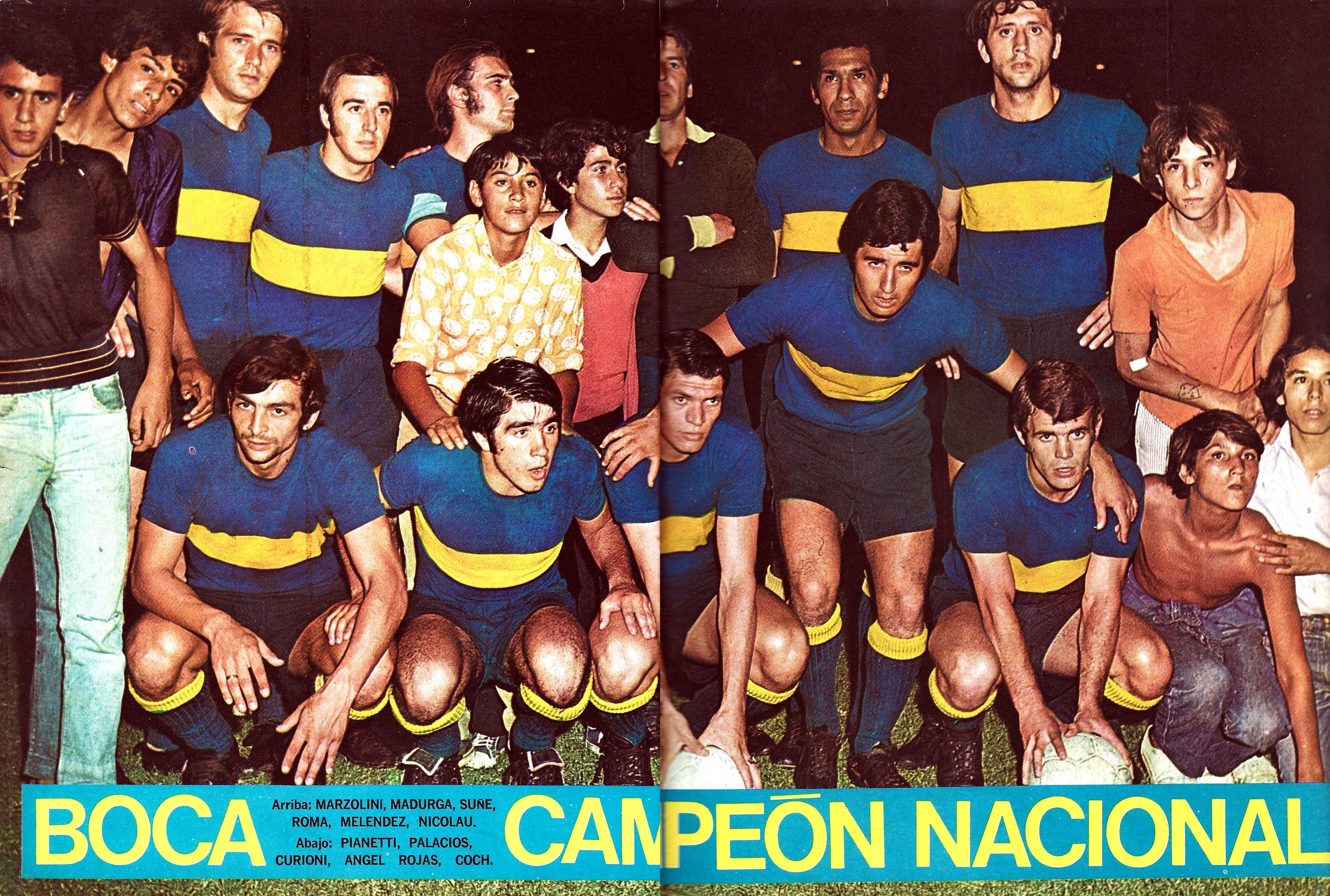
- Boca Juniors, champions
- Event: 1970 Campeonato Nacional
Boca Juniors	Rosario Central
2	1
- Date: 23 December 1970
- Venue: River Plate Stadium, Buenos Aires
- Referee: Ángel Coerezza

The 1970 Campeonato Nacional final was the final match to define the 1970 Campeonato Nacional of Argentine Primera División. It was played between Boca Juniors and Rosario Central.

It was the 3rd. final contested by Boca Juniors after 1923 (won a four-matches series v Huracán) and 1929 (lost v Gimnasia y Esgrima La Plata)

The match was held in the Estadio Monumental, home venue of Boca Juniors' arch-rival C.A. River Plate. Boca Juniors won their 18th. league title after defeating Rosario Central 2–1. It was the 2nd. final played (and won) by Boca Juniors at a River Plate home venue.

== Qualified teams ==
Team	Previous finals app.
Boca Juniors	**1923**, 1929
Rosario Central	(none)

Bold indicates winning years

== Venue ==
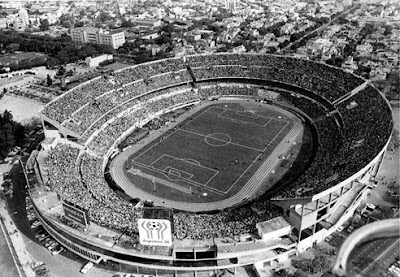
River Plate Stadium, venue

The match was held in River Plate Stadium, home of C.A. River Plate, which had a capacity of 80,000 spectators by then.

The stadium had been inaugurated in 1938 in a friendly match v Uruguayan club Peñarol amidst a crowd of approximately 70,000 people, and would be later expanded when FIFA selected Argentine as host of the 1978 FIFA World Cup. Estadio Monumental was the frequent venue for the Argentina national team matches, with the first game held in 1942.

The Estadio Monumental was venue for the athletics competitions in the 1951 Pan American Games. The stadium also hosted the 1978 FIFA World Cup Final when Argentina defeated Netherlands 3–1 to win their first WC trophy.

== Road to the final ==
Chacarita Juniors and Gimnasia y Esgrima La Plata (with 29 and 27 points respectively, in 20 matches played) were the best placed teams of group 1 while Rosario Central and Boca Juniors (both with 29 points and the also equalled on goal difference in group 2) earned their places in the semifinals. In semifinals, Rosario Central beat GELP 3–0 (at Newell's O.B. Stadium) while Boca Juniors defeated Chacarita Juniors 2–0 (at Racing Stadium).

== Match ==
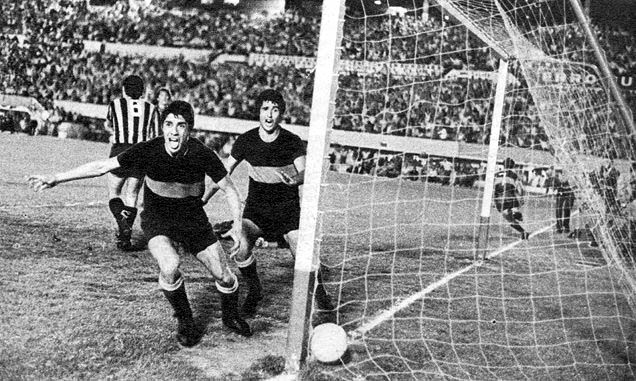
Angel Rojas celebrating his goal that forced to play extra time

Boca Juniors was coached by José María Silvero, who had replaced Alfredo Di Stéfano (under whose leadership Boca Juniors had won the 1969 Campeonato Nacional, before leaving the charge after disagreements with club idol Angel Clemente Rojas).

Rosario Central took advantage on the score when midfielder Ángel Landucci scored for the Canallas on 40' after a failure of Boca Juniors goalkeeper Antonio Roma. Nevertheless, in the second half Ángel Rojas tied the score on 79'. According to the championship rules, a 30' extra time had to be conducted to decide a champion. On 109' Jorge Coch headed the ball for the definitive 2–1 which allowed Boca Juniors to win their 18th. league title.

=== Details ===
1970 Campeonato Nacional Final
23 December 1970

Boca Juniors	2–1 (a.e.t.)	Rosario Central
Rojas 79'; Coch 109'	Report	Landucci 40'

River Plate Stadium, Buenos Aires
Referee: Ángel Coerezza

**Boca Juniors**	**Rosario Central**

GK	1	(Argentina) Antonio Roma
DF	4	(Argentina) Rubén Suñé
DF	2	(Peru) Julio Meléndez
DF	6	(Argentina) Miguel Nicolau
DF	3	(Argentina) Silvio Marzolini
MF	8	(Argentina) José Palacios
MF	5	(Argentina) Norberto Madurga
MF	10	(Argentina) Ángel C. Rojas
FW	7	(Argentina) Jorge Coch
FW	9	(Argentina) Hugo Curioni	(substituted off) 59'
FW	11	(Argentina) Óscar Pianetti	(substituted off) 96'
Substitutes:
FW		(Argentina) Raúl Savoy	(substituted on) 59'
MF		(Argentina) Antonio Cabrera	(substituted on) 96'
Manager:
(Argentina) José María Silvero

GK	1	(Peru) Ramón Quiroga
DF	4	(Argentina) Jorge J. González
DF	2	(Argentina) Alberto Fanesi
DF	6	(Argentina) José Mesiano
DF	3	(Argentina) Jorge Carrascosa
MF	8	(Argentina) Miguel A. Bustos
MF	5	(Argentina) Ángel Landucci
MF	10	(Argentina) Alberto Gómez
FW	7	(Argentina) Ramón Bóveda	(substituted off) 90'
FW	9	(Argentina) Aldo Poy
FW	11	(Argentina) Roberto Gramajo	(substituted off) 68'
Substitutes:
FW		(Argentina) Agustín Balbuena	(substituted on) 68'
FW		(Argentina) Carlos Colman	(substituted on) 90'
Manager:
(Argentina) Ángel Zof
