= Dolly Montoya Castaño =

Colombian scientist

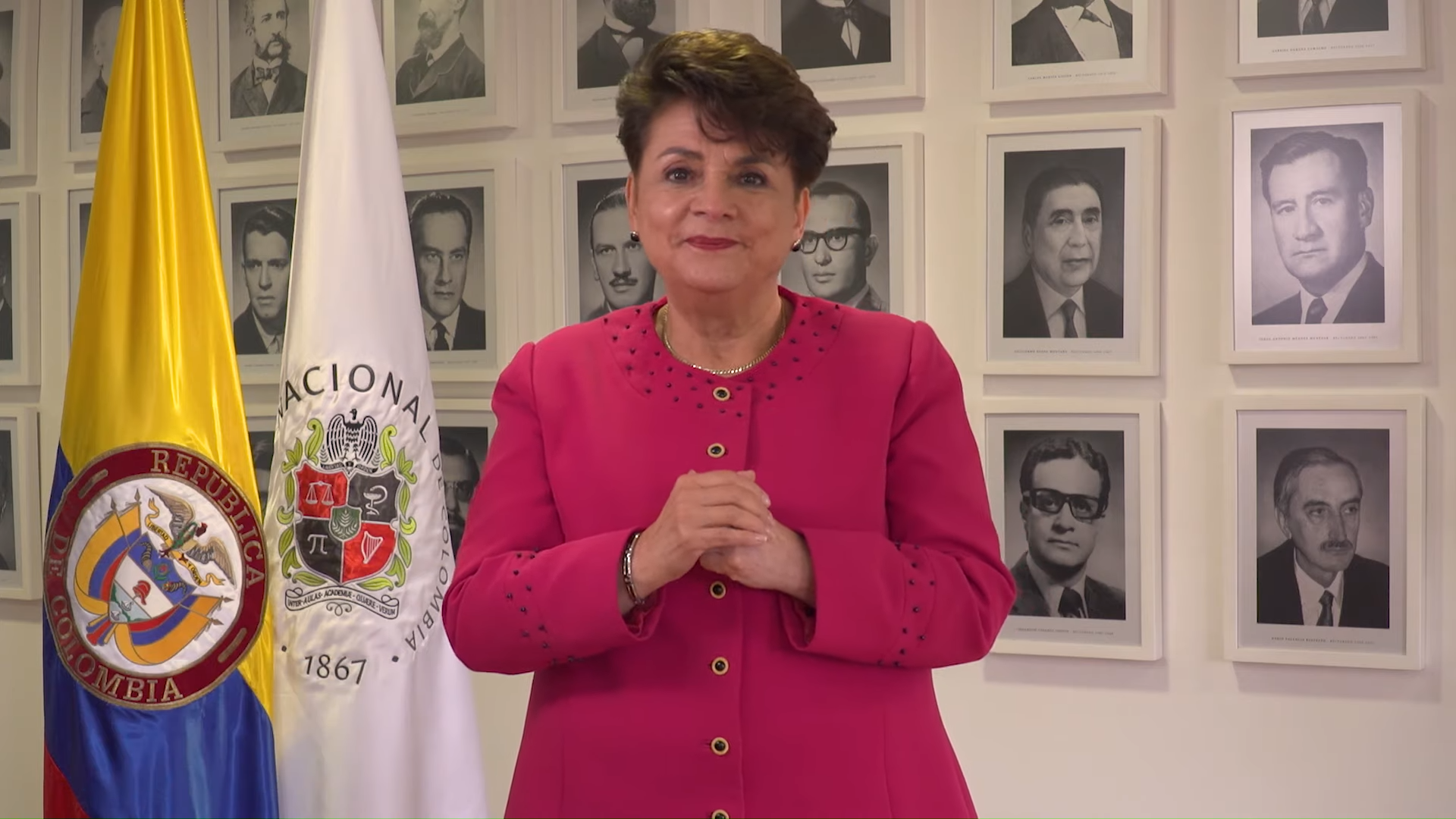
- Born: 26 May 1948 (age 78); Pereira, Risaralda, Colombia
- Occupation: Rector of the National University of Colombia
- Known for: Founder of the Institute of Biotechnology of the National University of Colombia

Academic work
- Main interests: Pharmaceutical Chemistry; Biotechnology
- Website: http://rectoria.unal.edu.co

Dolly Montoya Castaño (born May 26, 1948) is a Colombian university professor and scientist, and former rector of the National University of Colombia. She was re-elected for the period 2021–2024, having already served in 2018–2021 when she became the first woman to hold the position.

In addition to promoting academic research for some of the most vulnerable communities in the country, she directed the Institute of Biotechnology (Instituto de Biotecnología, IBUN) between 1987 and 1995.

== Academic education ==
Dolly Montoya Castaño is a pharmaceutical chemist from the National University of Colombia (1977), with a master's degree in basic biomedical sciences from the National Autonomous University of Mexico and a Ph.D. in natural sciences from the Technical University of Munich. Her thesis Anaerobic, Solvent-Producing Bacteria: Molecular Characterisation, Polysaccharolytic Activity and Agro-Industrial Waste Degradation was recognized with magna cum laude. Several of her publications affiliated with the National University of Colombia can be found on ResearchGate and other research portals.

For her academic and scientific work, Montoya has received several awards, including the "Medalla al Mejor Desempeño Académico Gabino Barreda" of the Autonomous University of Mexico (1983), Woman of Success in Colombia (2010), Prize for Scientific Merit (award "Samper Martinez") of the National Institute of Health (2017) and the decoration Order Cross of the Founders, granted by the Mayor of Pereira (2018).
