= Salvador Reynoso =

Argentine footballer

Personal information
- Full name: Salvador Agustín Reynoso
- Date of birth: 12 October 1987 (age 39)
- Place of birth: General Rodríguez, Argentina
- Height: 1.82 m (6 ft 0 in)
- Position: Midfielder

Senior career*
| Years | Team | Apps | (Gls) |
| 2008–2013 | San Lorenzo | 28 | (0) |
| 2012 | → Unión San Felipe (loan) | 12 | (0) |
| 2013–2014 | Sarmiento | 5 | (0) |
| 2014–2015 | All Boys | 12 | (0) |
| 2016 | Racing de Balcarce | 2 | (0) |
| 2016–2017 | Flandria | 2 | (0) |
| 2017–2018 | Atlético Paraná | 11 | (0) |
| 2020 | FADEP | 3 | (1) |
- * Club domestic league appearances and goals

Salvador Agustín Reynoso (born 12 October 1987) is an Argentine former footballer who played as a midfielder.

== Teams ==
- (Argentina) San Lorenzo 2008–2011
- (Chile) Unión San Felipe 2012
- (Argentina) San Lorenzo 2012–2013
- (Argentina) Sarmiento de Junín 2013–2014
- (Argentina) All Boys 2014–2015
- (Argentina) Racing de Balcarce 2016
- (Argentina) Flandria 2016–2017
- (Argentina) Atlético Paraná 2017–2018
- (Argentina) FADEP 2020
