= Gastón Aguirre =

Argentine footballer

Personal information
- Full name: Gastón Damián Aguirre
- Date of birth: 11 November 1981 (age 45)
- Place of birth: Adrogué, Argentina
- Height: 1.78 m (5 ft 10 in)
- Position: Centre back

Team information
- Current team: San Martín Burzaco

Senior career*
| Years | Team | Apps | (Gls) |
| 2000–2002 | Temperley | 68 | (4) |
| 2002–2003 | Olimpo | 19 | (0) |
| 2003–2007 | Newell's Old Boys | 90 | (3) |
| 2007–2012 | San Lorenzo | 92 | (5) |
| 2012–2018 | CA Temperley | 144 | (4) |
| 2018–2019 | Tristán Suárez | 23 | (1) |
| 2019– | San Martín Burzaco | | |

International career
| 2004 | Argentina U-23 | 3 | (0) |
- * Club domestic league appearances and goals as of 15:43, 21 June 2019 (UTC)

Gastón Damián Aguirre (born 11 November 1981, in Adrogué) is an Argentine football defender who plays for San Martín de Burzaco.

== Career ==
Aguirre started his playing career in 2000 with Temperley in the regionalised 3rd division of Argentine football. In 2002, he joined Olimpo de Bahía Blanca of the Argentine Primera and at the end of the season he joined Newell's Old Boys of Rosario. Aguirre joined San Lorenzo in 2007 and established himself as a regular first team player.

Aguirre gained notoriety in late 2008, when during a match between Tigre and San Lorenzo, he accidentally hit a group of pigeons standing on the field, and one of the birds was killed by the impact of the shot.
