= Raúl Castaño Escobar =

- Born: May 23, 1956 (age 70); Ubaté, Cundinamarca, Colombia
- Occupation: Pianist

Raúl Castaño Escobar (Ubaté, 23 May 1956) is a musician and composer of Colombian music. Considered one of the best performers in the field of traditional music in Colombia. He is particularly renowned as an interpreter of Luis Antonio Calvo, Gentil Montaña, Francisco Cristancho, and José A. Morales, among other composers of Colombian Andean music. He is the 1998 Mono Núñez Festival winner as best performer of "A Mi Tiple", by Guillermo Amado Gracia, and was named Honorary Member of the Colombian Academy of Music in 2015.
