= Castaño (bakery) =

Chilean bakery chain

Panaderías Castaño
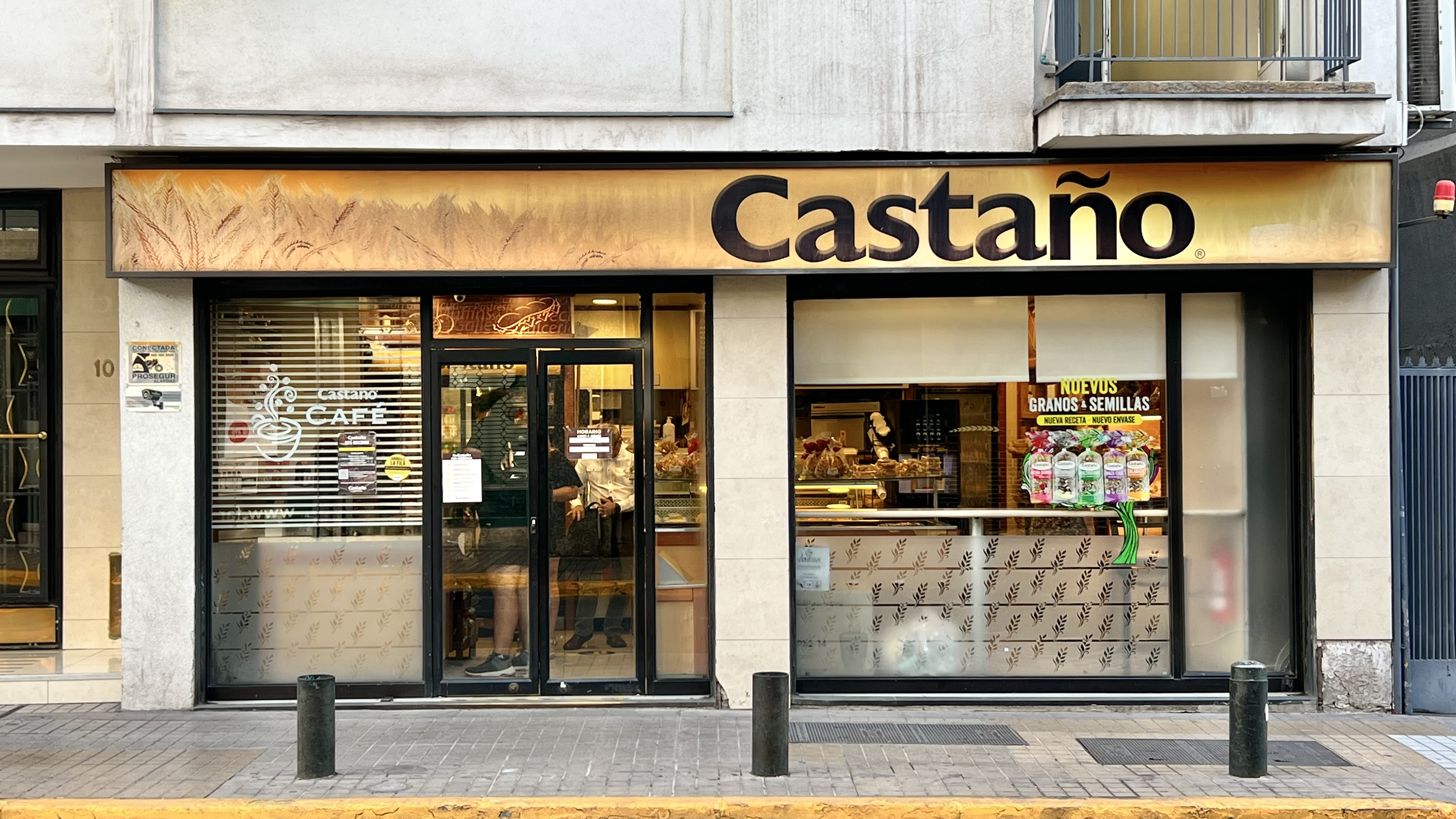
- A store front in Santiago (2023)
- Industry: Food
- Founded: 1933
- Headquarters: Santiago, Chile
- Area served: Chile
- Number of employees: 600
- Website: castano.cl

Panaderías Castaño is a chain of bakeries in Chile. It is the second largest bakery chain in the country. Its subsidiary, Grain Red S.A., opened the first Starbucks coffee outlet in Chile.

In addition to selling bread, its empanadas are also popular. The sweet version, topped with chancaca, of sopaipilla, a traditional pastry popular in Chilean culture, is also well known in Castaño bakeries.

== Animal Welfare ==
In 2018, the international NGO, Sinergia Animal, launched a campaign directed at the company, asking them to announce a cage-free egg commitment for its entire supply chain. By 2021, the company still has not made a statement regarding the motion.
