= Miguel Castaño =

Spanish journalist and politician (1883-1936)

Mayor of León, Spain
- In office 1931–1936

Member of Parliament
- In office 1931–1933
- Constituency: Province of León

Personal details
- Born: 23 February 1883 León, Spain
- Died: 21 November 1936 (aged 53) Puente Castro (León, Spain)
- Party: Spanish Socialist Workers Party (PSOE)
- Profession: Journalist

Miguel Castaño Quiñones (23 February 1883 in León, Spain - 21 November 1936) was a Spanish socialist politician, engineer and journalist, member of Parliament during the Second Spanish Republic and the first democratically elected Mayor of León, serving until his assassination in 1936 by Francoist rebels during the Spanish Civil War.
