= Cecilia Castaño =

Spanish professor, political scientist, economist, writer

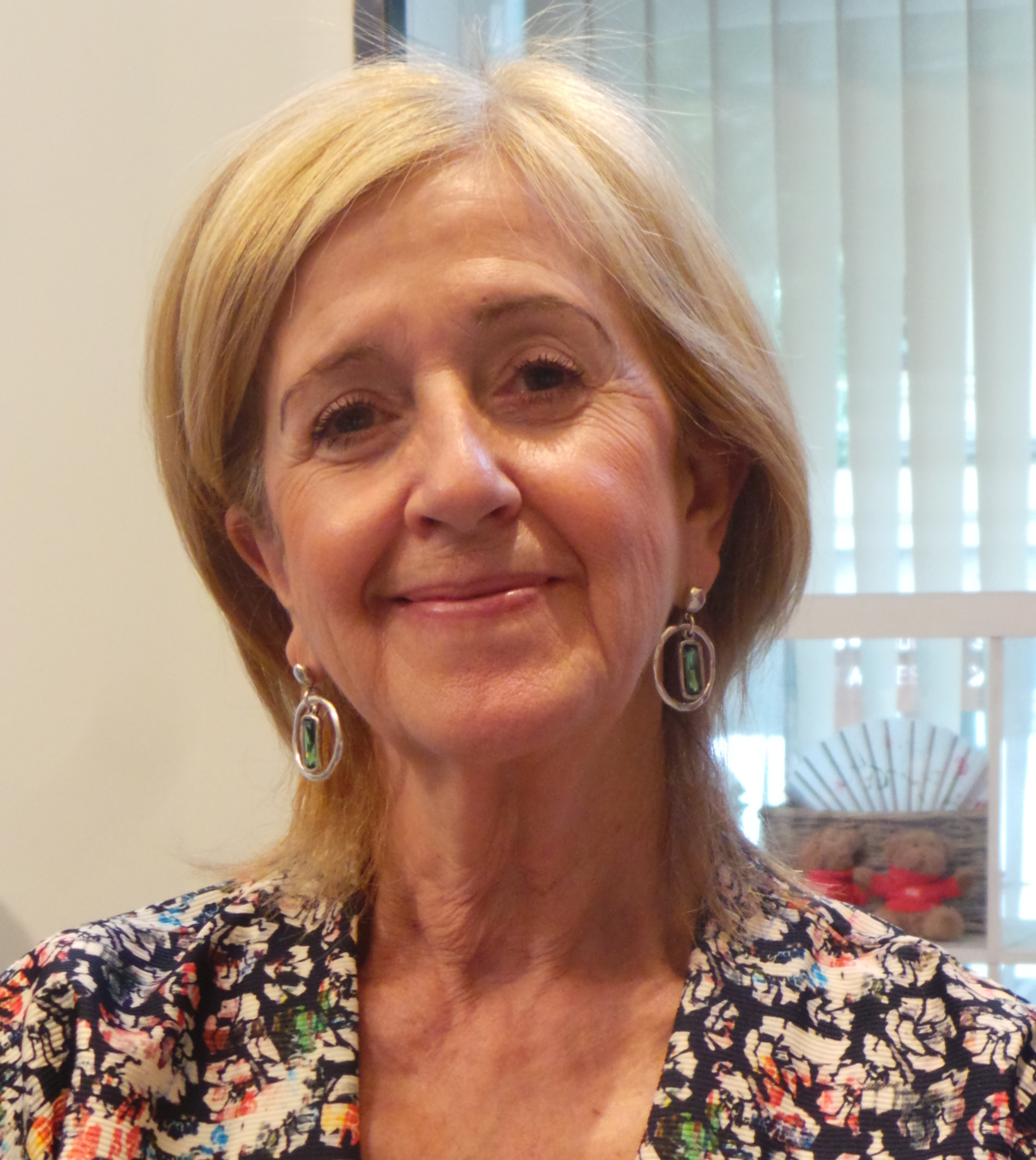
- Born: Cecilia Castaño Collado; 10 February 1953 (age 73); Almería, Spain
- Education: Complutense University of Madrid
- Occupations: Professor of Applied Economics; lecturer at the Complutense University of Madrid's Department of Applied Economics
- Employer: Complutense University of Madrid

Cecilia Castaño Collado (born 10 February 1953) is a PhD in Political Science, professor of Applied Economics, and lecturer at the Complutense University of Madrid's Department of Applied Economics. She is an expert in information technology and its effect on women's employment and work. She has conducted numerous investigations on the digital gender gap and women's access to the information society. In 2006 she created the Research Program on Gender and the Information Society of the Open University of Catalonia (UOC). She has been a visiting researcher at Harvard University, MIT, and UC Berkeley.

== Professional career ==
Cecilia Castaño graduated in Political Science from the Complutense University of Madrid (UCM) in 1974 and received her doctorate in 1983 with the thesis La Industria del Automóvil en España: Efectos de los procesos de cambio tecnológico sobre las condiciones del mercado de trabajo (The Automobile Industry in Spain: Effects of the Processes of Technological Change on the Conditions of the Labor Market).

In 1975, she began her teaching career at the UCM's Faculty of Political Science and Sociology; in 1976, she became part of the Department of Economic Structure, which she has been a professor of since 1992.

From 1977 to 1999, she was a consultant in the Technical Cabinet of the Workers' Commissions Trade Union. From 1983 to 1984 she was an advisor in the Technical Cabinet of the Minister of Labor and Social Security of the Government of Spain, under minister Joaquín Almunia.

From 1984 to 1985 she was a member of the Research Team on New Technologies, Economics, and Society, directed by the sociologist Manuel Castells. From 1987 to 1988 she collaborated with the Organization and Management of Innovation (OGEIN) Program of the Public Company Foundation of the National Institute of Industry.

In the mid-1990s, she reoriented her research career from studies on the impact of technological change in the labor market to the analysis of the relationship between gender and information technologies. In 1999 she published the work Diferencia o discriminación. La situación de las mujeres en el mercado de trabajo y el impacto de las tecnologías de la información (Difference or Discrimination: The Situation of Women in the Labor Market and the Impact of Information Technologies).

From 2000 to 2005 Castaño directed research projects at the University of Seville's Regional Development Institute, and from 2000 to 2006 at the University of Alcalá's Service Sector Research Laboratory (Servilab).

In 2002 she participated in the creation of the UCM's Equality Commission of the Faculty of Policies.

From 2003 to 2008 she was member of the Scientific Committee of the Internet Interdisciplinary Institute (IN3) of the Open University of Catalonia, directed by Manuel Castells. She was a member of the Complutense University's advisory board, as well as a member of the advisory board of its School of Labor Relations.

In 2005 she published Las mujeres y las tecnologías de la información. Internet y la trama de nuestra vida (Women and Information Technologies: Internet and the Fabric of Our Lives), a book in which she analyzes to what extent and by what means information technologies contribute to the full incorporation of women in economic and social activity and its effects, raising the new forms of gender inequality produced by digital illiteracy.

From 2006 to 2012 she directed IN3's Gender and ICT research program, created to analyze the barriers to the incorporation and permanence of women in university studies, research, and business of the information technology field, as well as the policies that are implemented in different areas to overcome these barriers.

Castaño also leads UCM's e-Equality Observatory, which since 2006 has been studying the situation of the incorporation of women into the Internet in Spain and Europe.

In 2007 she was a visiting scholar at Harvard University's Minda de Gunzburg Center for European Studies.

In 2008, she published La segunda brecha digital (The Second Digital Divide), incorporating into the debate on the gender digital divide the need to pay attention not only to connectivity, but also to the use that men and women make of technology.

In 2015 she directed the collective book Las mujeres y la gran recesión (Women and the Great Recession), in which the data of the crisis and its impact on women's rights are analyzed.

She is a member of the editorial board of the Feminism Collection of the Editorial Chair and member of the editorial board of the journal Politics and Society of the Faculty of Political Science and Sociology (since 1997), and writes for various media.

== Second digital divide ==
Castaño has dedicated several works to the analysis of the gender digital divide, and has investigated and warned about the existence of the "second digital gender gap", referring not only to inequality in access, but also in the different use that men and women make of technology.

The relevance of the first division or digital divide is related above all to the quality of Internet access. But the technical availability and the quality of the access are a necessary, though not sufficient, condition for access. Access to the Internet is a social phenomenon and the social conditions of access are important. Among them, the most relevant is the ability to use technologies, what we have called digital literacy or digital fluency, which constitute the cutting lines of the second digital division.

— Cecilia Castaño, La segunda brecha digital

== Books ==
- Cambio tecnológico y mercado de trabajo en la industria del automóvil (1985), Ministry of Labor and Social Security, ISBN 84-7434-272-4
- Tecnología, empleo y trabajo en España (1994), Alianza Editorial, ISBN 978-84-206-6402-6
- Salud, dinero y amor: Cómo viven las mujeres españolas de hoy (1996), Alianza Editorial
- Las mujeres y las tecnologías de la información: Internet y la trama de nuestra vida (2005), Alianza Editorial, ISBN 84-206-9112-7
- La segunda brecha digital (2008), Ediciones Cátedra, ISBN 9788437624754
- Mujeres y poder empresarial en España (2009), Cecilia Castaño Collado, Joaquina Laffarga Briones, Carlos Iglesias Fernández, Pilar de Fuentes Ruiz, Juan Martín Fernández, Raquel Llorente Heras, María J. Charlo, Yolanda Giner Manso, Susana Vázquez Cupeiro, Miriam Núñez Torrado, José Luis Martínez Cantos, Madrid: Instituto de la Mujer ISBN 978-84-692-4022-9
- Género y TIC. Presencia, posición y políticas (2010), UOC Ediciones, ISBN 9788497889346
- Género, ciencia y tecnologías de la información (2014), Juliet Webster and Cecilia Castaño, Editorial Aresta, ISBN 9788494145667
- Las mujeres en la gran recesión (2015), Olga Cantó Sánchez, Cecilia Castaño Collado, Inmaculada Cebrián López, Diego Dueñas Fernández, Juan Antonio Fernández Cordón, Carlos Iglesias Fernández, Raquel Llorente Heras, Miguel Ángel Malo Ocaña, Juan Martín Fernández, José Luis Martínez Cantos, Gloria Moreno Raymundo, Constanza Tobío, Editorial Cátedra, ISBN 978-84-376-3373-2
