= Castano =

Castano may refer to:

- Castano Primo, a city and comune in Province of Milan, in the Italian region Lombardy
- Blas Castano (born 1998), a Dominican professional baseball pitcher
- Daniel Castano, an American former professional baseball pitcher
- Ernesto Castano, an Italian former professional footballer

== See also ==
- Castana (disambiguation)
- Castaño (disambiguation)
- Castagno (disambiguation)
