= Ángel Landucci =

Argentinian footballer (born 1948)

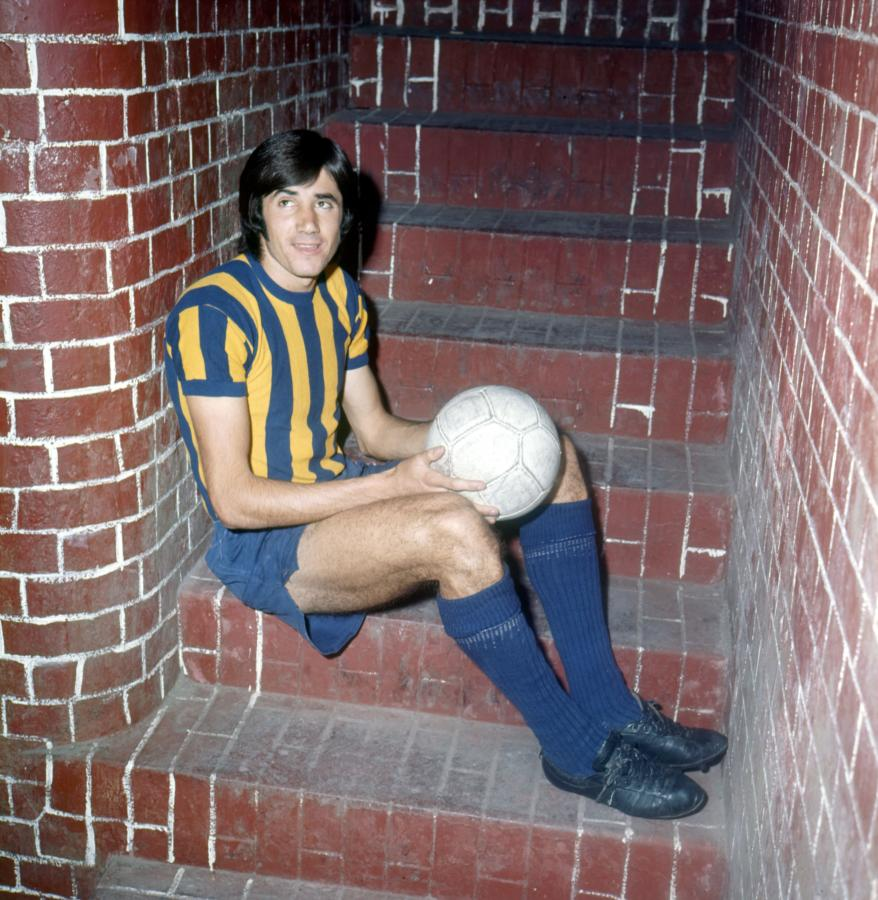
- Landucci in 1969

Personal information
- Full name: Ángel Antonio Landucci Ferrarín
- Date of birth: 23 January 1948 (age 78)
- Place of birth: Rosario, Santa Fe, Argentina
- Position: Midfielder

Senior career*
Years	Team	Apps	(Gls)
1969–1973	Rosario Central		
1973–1977	Sporting de Gijón		
1977–1980	Deportivo Cali		
1980	Unión de Santa Fe		
1981	Gimnasia de Jujuy		
1982	Estudiantes de La Plata		
1983	Argentinos Juniors		
1984	Atlanta		
1985	Argentino de Firmat		

International career
1971–1972	Argentina	8	(0)
- * Club domestic league appearances and goals

Ángel Antonio Landucci Ferrarín (born 23 January 1948) is a retired Argentinian football player. Nicknamed "Flaco", he played as a midfielder and would be recognized as a player for Rosario Central, Sporting de Gijón, and Deportivo Cali in the 1970s. He also briefly played for Argentina, participating in the Brazil Independence Cup.

== Club career ==
Landucci began his career in 1969 by playing for Rosario Central where he would find immediate success in, becoming a starting player and renowned by the club's fans. He would become part of the squad that would go on to win the 1971 Nacional Championship. Later, Landucci played for Sporting de Gijón during the 1973–74 season where he would play until the 1976–77 season as he would then play for Deportivo Cali for the remainder of the year and would then participate in the 1978 Copa Libertadores where the club would reach the finals but would ultimately lose to Boca Juniors in the 1978 Copa Libertadores finals. He would remain in Deportivo Cali until the 1980 season as he would then play for Unión de Santa Fe. Throughout the 1980s, he would play for a variety of clubs including Gimnasia y Esgrima de Jujuy, Argentinos Juniors. Club Atlético Atlanta, and for his final season, would play for Club Atlético Argentino de Firmat. His biggest accomplishment he made during the decade was winning the 1982 Argentine Primera División with Estudiantes de La Plata.

== International career ==
During 1971 and 1972, Landucci would play for the Argentina national football team, making 8 appearances for the team. He would also play for Argentina during the Brazil Independence Cup where he would be the substitute for Alejandro Semenewicz during the group stage match against Colombia.
