= Francisco Sans Castaño =

Spanish painter

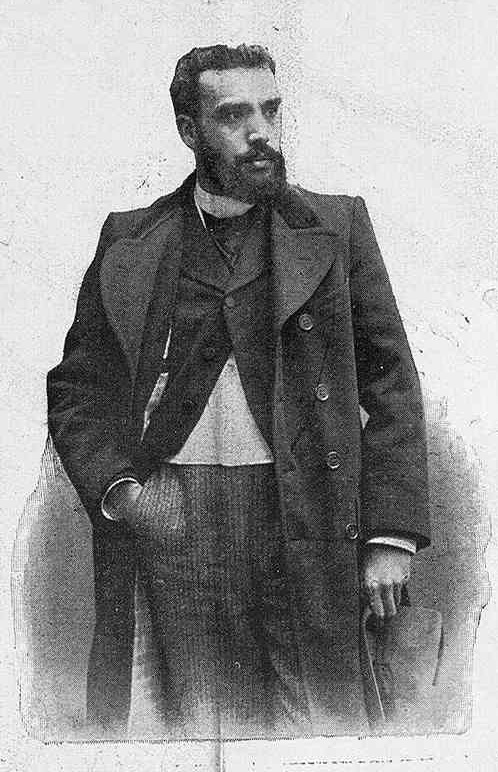
- Born: 1868
- Died: 1937 (aged 68–69)

Francisco (or Francesc) Sans Castaño (1868–1937) was a Spanish painter and engraver.

Born in Barcelona, he studied at the School of Fine Arts of Barcelona. He collaborated at the Hojas Selectas magazine. He was a member of the Barcelona's Circle of Fine Arts, a dissident organization of the Artistic Circle.

He took part in the 1882, 1887, 1890, 1899 and 1910 National Exhibitions (winning an honorary mention in that of 1887) and in the 1911 World's Fair, winning a third-class medal.

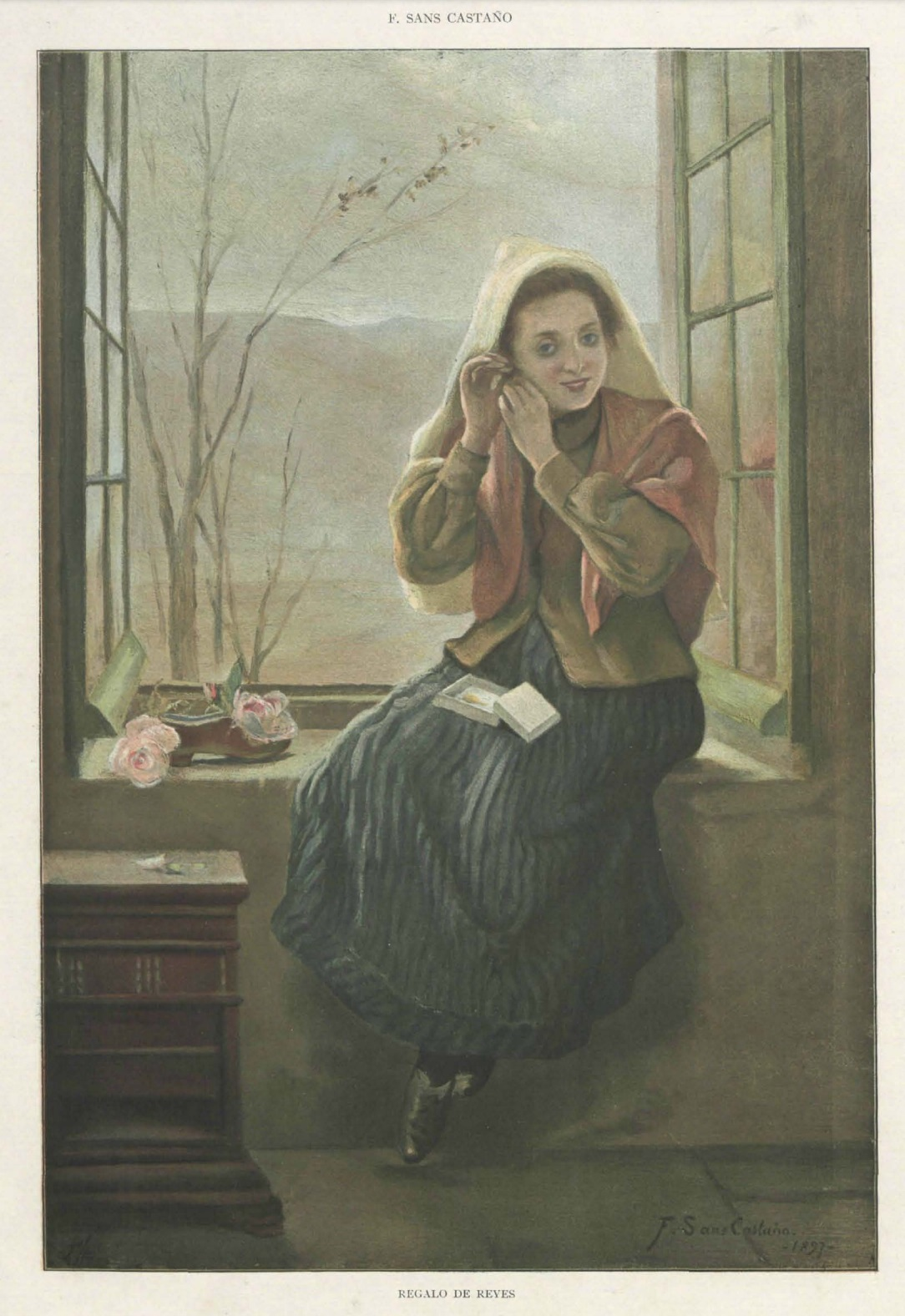
Regalo de reyes

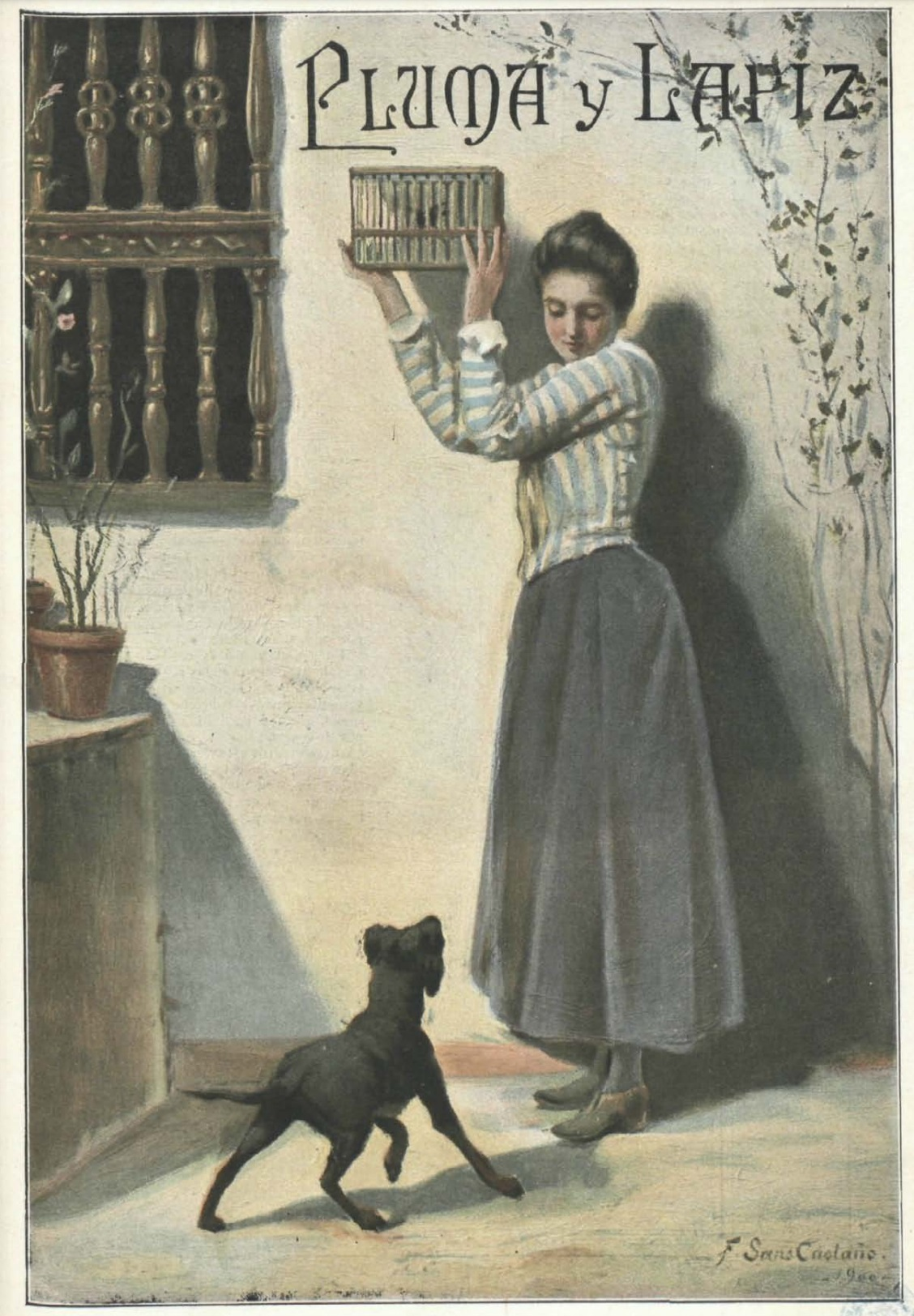
Cover for issue 44 of Pluma y Lápiz (1901)
