= Damián Leyes =

Argentine footballer

Personal information
- Full name: Cristian Damián Leyes
- Date of birth: January 14, 1986 (age 40)
- Place of birth: San Luis, Argentina
- Height: 1.80 m (5 ft 11 in)
- Position: Defender

Team information
- Current team: Guaraní Antonio Franco (on loan from Quilmes)

Senior career*
Years	Team	Apps	(Gls)
2008–2010	Tigre	54	(3)
2010–	Quilmes	37	(1)
2015–	→ Guaraní Antonio Franco (loan)	7	(0)
- * Club domestic league appearances and goals as of 25 April 2015

Cristian Damián Leyes (born January 14, 1986) is an Argentine football defender who plays for Guaraní Antonio Franco in the Primera B Nacional, on loan from Quilmes.

== Career ==
Leyes began his playing career with Tigre in 2008. He made his league debut in a 2–1 away win against Colón on 1 March 2008. After playing more than 50 league games with Tigre, Leyes transferred to Quilmes on a free transfer in July 2010, signing a 3-year deal.
