= Diego Castaño =

Argentine footballer

Personal information
- Full name: Diego Rafael Castaño
- Date of birth: 8 June 1979 (age 47)
- Place of birth: Bragado, Argentina
- Height: 1.91 m (6 ft 3 in)
- Position: Defensive midfielder

Senior career*
Years	Team	Apps	(Gls)
2001–2002	9 de Julio (BA)		
2003–2004	Rivadavia de Lincoln		
2004–2014	Tigre	241	(9)
2014	Sarmiento	5	(0)
2014–2015	Rivadavia de Lincoln		
2016–2017	Tigre	6	(0)

Managerial career
- 2022–2024: El Linqueño (assistant)
- * Club domestic league appearances and goals

Diego Rafael Castaño (born 8 June 1979) is an Argentine football coach and a former midfielder.

== Career ==
Castaño started his career in the lower leagues of Argentine football, playing for 9 de Julio de Buenos Aires and then Rivadavia de Lincoln before signing for Tigre in 2004.

Castaño has been part of Tigre's rise through the divisions, his first season with the club saw them win the Apertura and the Clausura to secure promotion to the Argentine 2nd division. In 2007 the club were promoted to the Argentine Primera. The Apertura 2007 was Tigre's first season in the Primera since 1980, and Castaño's first taste of top flight football. Castaño was a key member of the first team, playing in nearly all of Tigre's games. The club finished in 2nd place which was the highest league finish in their history.
