= Castagna =

Castagna may refer to:

== People ==
- Andrea del Castagno (c.1419–1457), Italian painter
- Armando Castagna, Italian speedway rider
- Cacho Castagna (1942–2019), Argentine musician
- Cristina Castagna (1977–2009), Italian mountaineer
- Domingo Salvador Castagna (born 1931), Argentine Roman Catholic archbishop
- Filippo Castagna (1765–1830), Maltese politician
- John Castagna, American geophysicist
- Michele Paco Castagna, Italian speedway rider
- William J. Castagna (1924–2020), American jurist

== Companies ==
- Carrozzeria Castagna, an Italian coachbuilding company from Milan

== Places ==
- Castagna, Catanzaro, a town in the Calabria region of southern Italy
- Castel Castagna, a town in the Abruzzo region of central Italy
- Castagna (restaurant), a restaurant in Portland, Oregon, United States
