= 1929 Argentine Primera División final =

1929 Primera División final
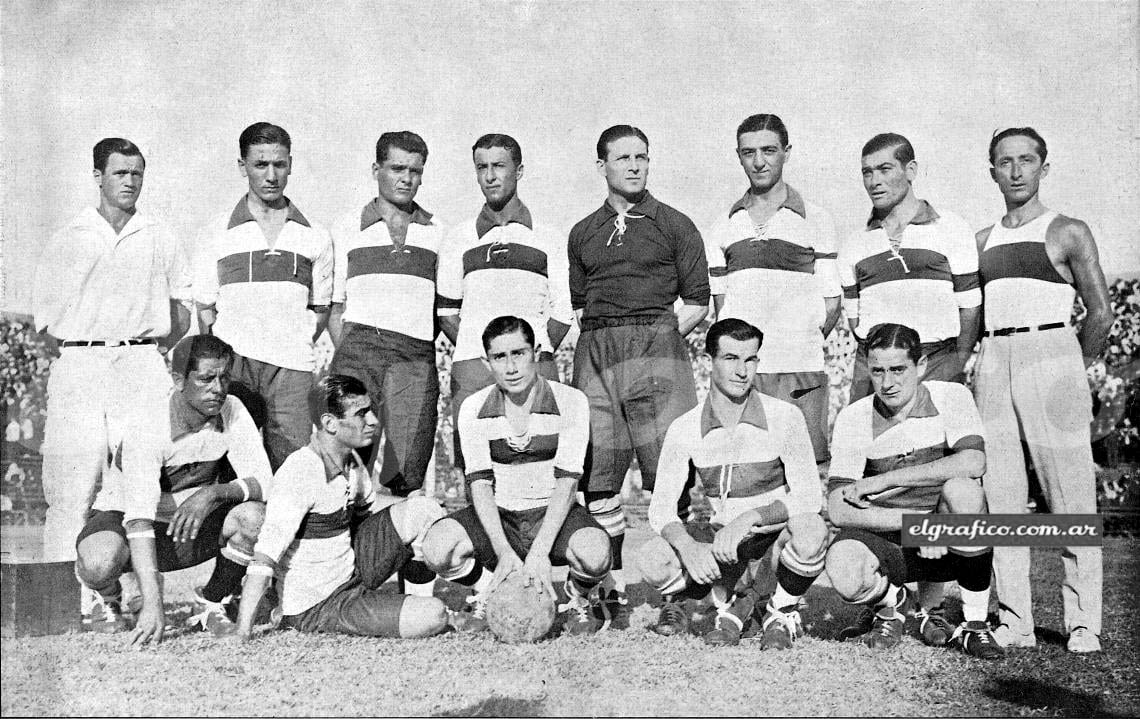
- Gimnasia y Esgrima La Plata, champions
- Event: 1929 Primera División
Gimnasia y Esgrima (LP)	Boca Juniors
2	1
- Date: 9 February 1930
- Venue: River Plate Stadium, Buenos Aires
- Referee: Di Tomaso

The 1929 Argentine Primera División final was the final match to define the 1929 Argentine Primera División championship. It was played between Gimnasia y Esgrima de La Plata and Boca Juniors after both teams won their respective groups at the end of the season.

The match was held in the River Plate Stadium located in Recoleta, Buenos Aires. Gimnasia y Esgrima won their first (and only to date) league title after defeating Boca Juniors 2–1.

== Qualified teams ==
Team	Qualification	Previous finals app.
Gimnasia y Esgrima (LP)	Group A winner	(none)
Boca Juniors	Group B winner	**1923**

Bold indicates winning years

== Venue ==
Buenos Aires
River Plate Stadium
Capacity: **50,000**
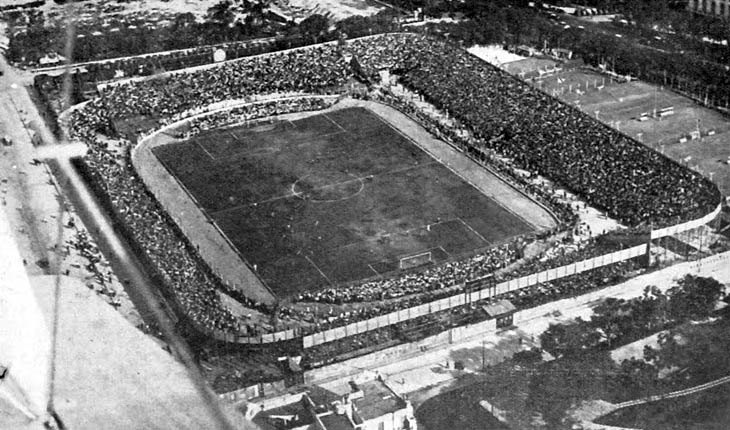

== Road to the final ==
The Association organised the 1929 championship using the same format than Copa Estímulo, with no relegations that season. According to that format, participating clubs were divided into two groups, playing each other in a single round-robin tournament. The best placed teams of each group qualified to play a final in order to define the champion, while the second teams of each group would play the third place match.

Gimnasia y Esgrima won the group A while in group B, Boca Juniors and San Lorenzo finished tied on points so they had to play a match to define the other finalist. Boca Juniors earned their place in the final after defeating San Lorenzo in the 3rd. match (3–1, after two previous 2–2 draws with no extra time so both teams refused to play it)

== Background ==
According to the media and fans, Boca Juniors was the favorite for the match. The Xeneizes had a strong team with keyplayers as defender Ludovico Bidoglio (who was considered one of the best defenders of that time, and had won the silver medal with Argentina at the 1928 Summer Olympics), midfielder Manuel Fleitas Solich (captain of the Paraguay national team) striker Roberto Cherro (ranked 2nd. among all-time Boca Juniors' top scorers with 221 goals in 305 games for the club.

== Match ==
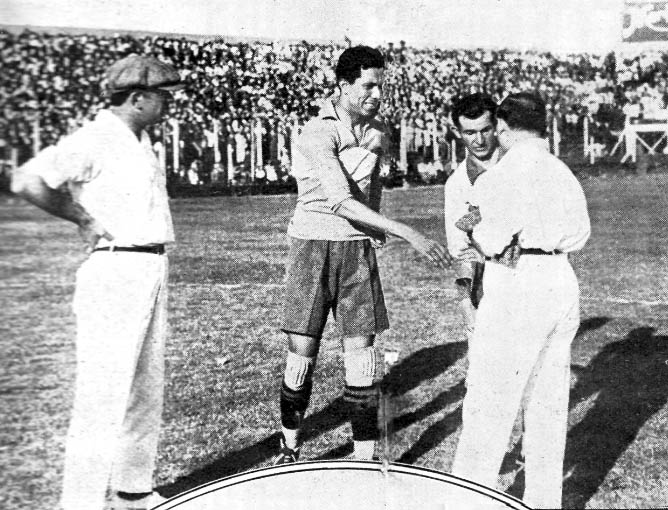
The captains salute before the match

The first minutes of the match showed the two teams struggling to overcome each other. Gimnasia's goalkeeper Felipe Scarpone was the keyplayer of the first half but he couldn't avoid Boca Juniors to score the first goal by Paraguayan midfielder Manuel Fleitas Solich. During the initial 16 minutes of the first half, the La Plata team, displaying commendable enthusiasm, moved with agility and knew how to pressure the opposing defense. After this period, Boca began to impose their class and continued to lay siege to Scarpone's goal. The goal, although due to a mistake by Dí Gianno, was just compensation for the team that had demonstrated greater merit.

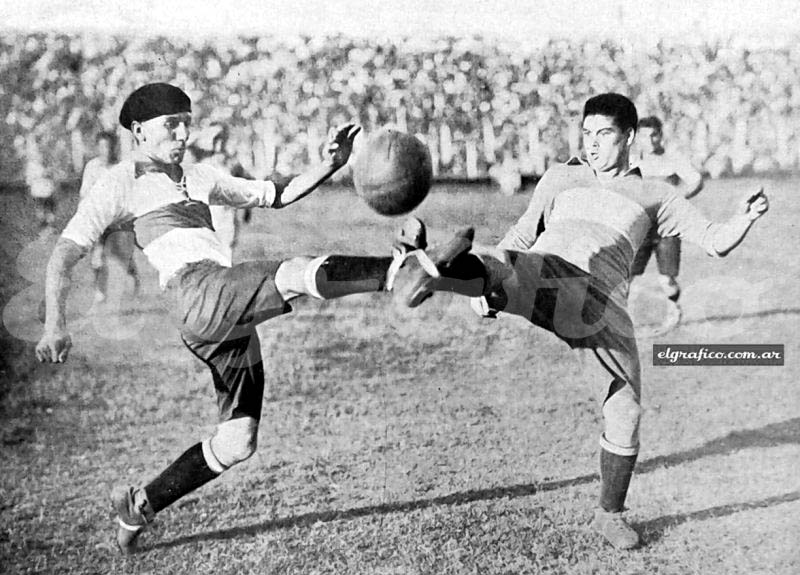
Evaristo Delovo and Roberto Cherro going for the ball

Once the game restarted, Boca continued on the offensive until the 10th minute, when their own goal miraculously saved from an GELP's offensive attempt. This encouraged the La Plata crowd, who saw a chance to tie the game. A strong wind then began to blow in favor of the latter, and while Boca's defense made real efforts to move the light ball into the opponent's half, Gimnasia y Esgrima's defense, well aware of the advantage offered by the wind, opted for sending the ball far from their goal. Thus, with a single shot they reached Mena's goal, where things were taking on a continuing danger.

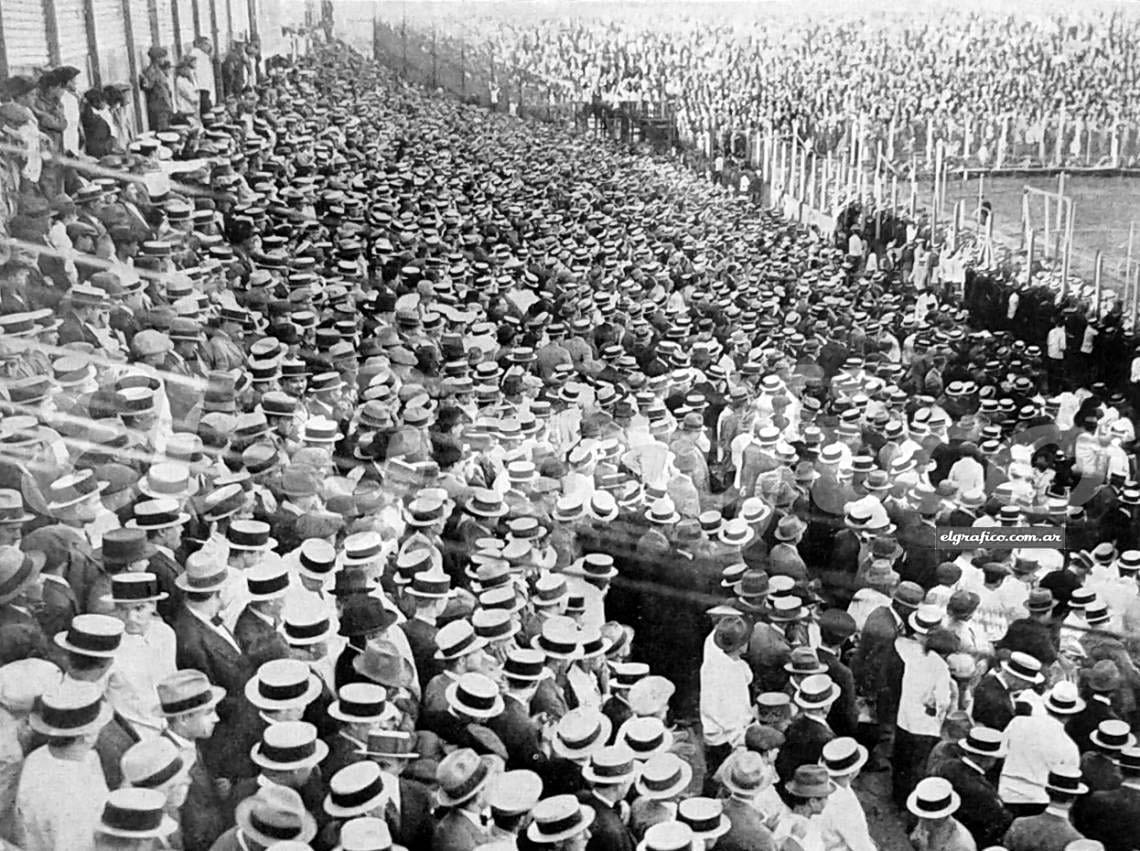
The crowd at River Plate Stadium

GELP showed their best version on the second half, where the team scored for the 1–1 draw after Ismael Morgada ran with the ball to the goal line while dribbling rivals Adolfo Pedemonte and Ludovico Bidoglio. Morgada passed the ball to forward Martín Malianni who scored with no opposition. Boca pressed again, and, finding themselves on the offensive, suffered another fall. With 20 minutes left, Morgada dribbled Bidoglio again and made another pass from the goal line, received by Maliani who scored his second goal for the definitive 2–1 win. The 5,000 Triperos at River Plate stadium started a huge celebration.

Boca launched its offensive again. It persisted with its desperate attacks. Bidoglio pushed forward; the entire team, except for Strada and Mena, began to act in the opposing half. Scarpone's goal was about to fall at any moment. It seemed inevitable; but the players defending it refused to give up. They resisted the attacks and even attempted attacks that went deep because they encountered no major obstacles. Boca's dominance was evident. Nevertheless, despite Boca Juniors attempts to tie during the remaining time, Gimnasia y Esgrima's defenders put their best efforts to stop the Boca Juniors attempts, being successful at that point.

=== Details ===
1929 Primera División Final
9 February 1930

Gimnasia y Esgrima (LP)	2–1	Boca Juniors
Maleanni 62', 70'	Report	Di Gianno 30' (o.g.)

River Plate Stadium, Buenos Aires
Referee: Di Tomaso

**Gimnasia y Esgima LP**	**Boca Juniors**

GK	(Argentina) Felipe Scarpone
DF	(Argentina) Julio Di Giano
DF	(Argentina) Evaristo Delovo
MF	(Argentina) Vicente Ruscitti
MF	(Argentina) Juan Santillán
MF	(Argentina) Antonio Belli
FW	(Argentina) Miguel Curell
FW	(Argentina) Francisco Varallo
FW	(Argentina) Martín Malianni
FW	(Argentina) Jesús Díaz
FW	(Argentina) Ismael Morgada

GK	(Argentina) Alejandro Mena
DF	(Argentina) Ludovico Bidoglio
DF	(Argentina) Luis Strada
MF	(Argentina) Américo Amoia
MF	(Paraguay) Manuel Fleitas Solich
MF	(Argentina) Adolfo Pedemonte
FW	(Argentina) Donato Penella
FW	(Argentina) Esteban Kuko
FW	(Argentina) Mario Evaristo
FW	(Argentina) Roberto Cherro
FW	(Argentina) Antonio Alberino

== Media coverage ==
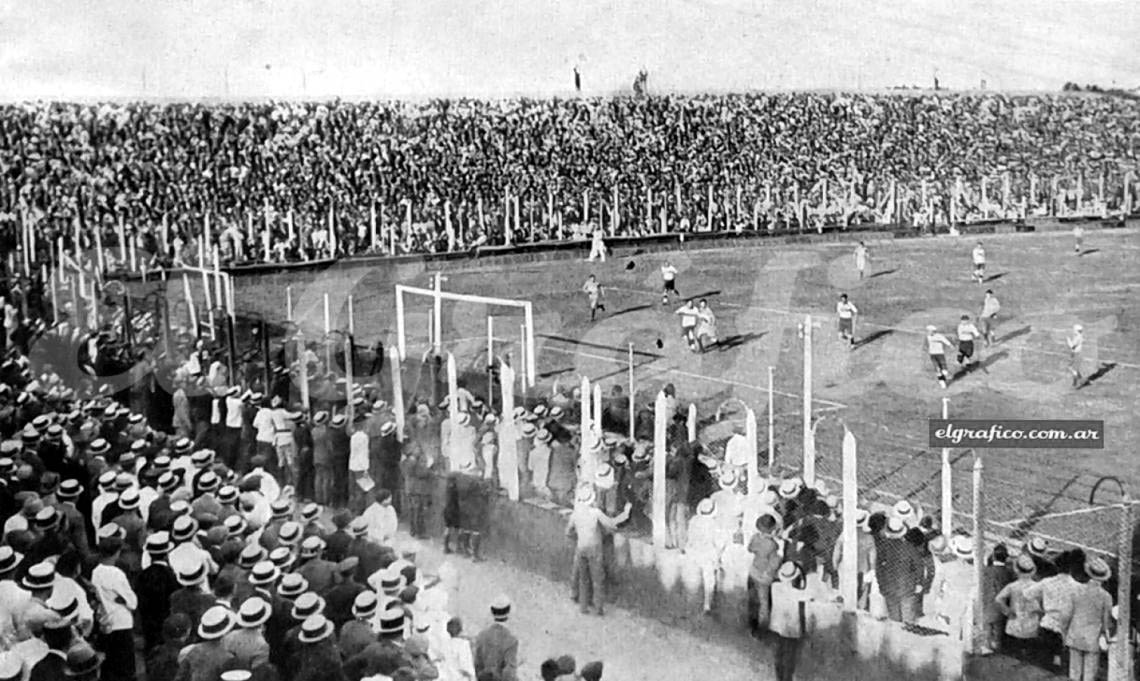
A moment of the match

Boca outplayed its opponent with its defense. Assuming the two teams' forward lines were of equal capacity, the advantage in terms of defense was in favor of the losers. Their men were more alert, clearing and supporting, while the opponents limited themselves to clearing situations without linking up plays. This defense lacked figures like Fleitas, Solich, and Bidoglio, who put in formidable performances, to the point of being named the best man on the field.

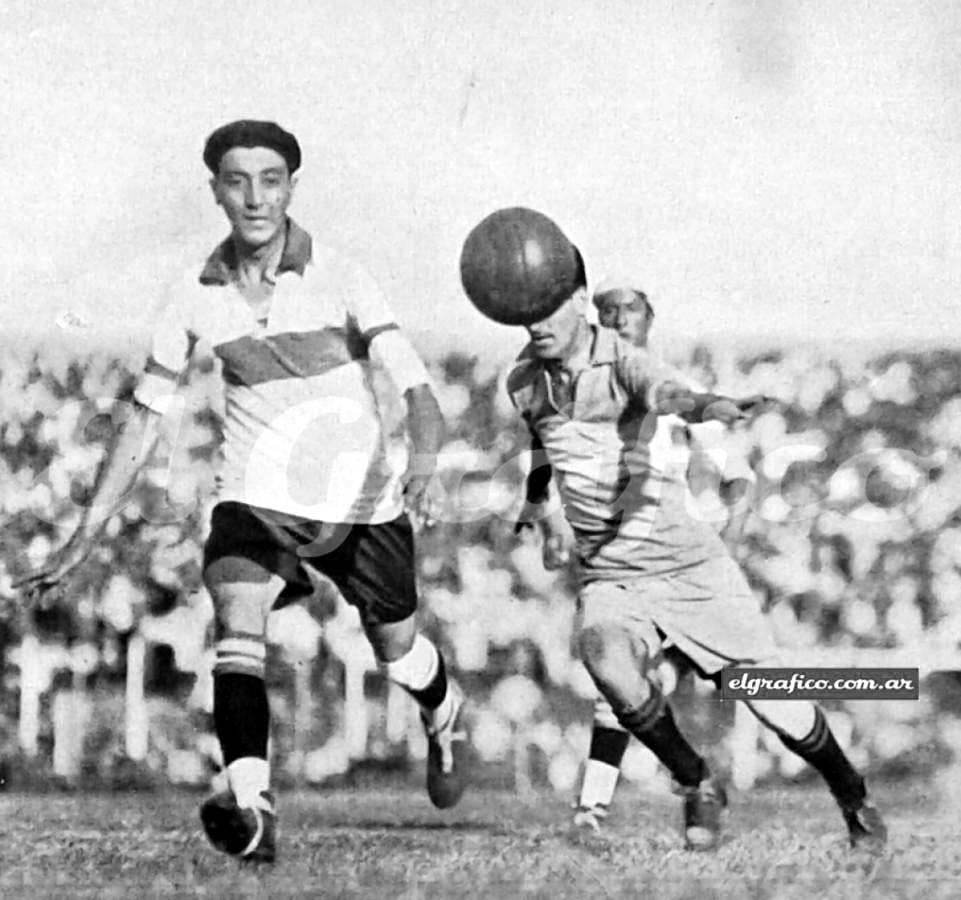
Mario Evaristo (right) with the ball while Delovo follows them

This lack of play was partly compensated for by the enthusiasm they displayed throughout the match, although they failed to match the opponents' pace. Regarding the agile lines, Boca's best performance was undoubtedly their left wing. Evaristo was always determined, but without luck, and on the right wing, they performed poorly, with Penella performing better in the first half than in the second. If Alberino and Chorro were Boca's best forwards, Varallo and Morgada were Gimnasia y Esgrima's best, with Malianni having the honor of scoring both goals. Curell and Díaz weren't as good as their teammates, the latter being better than the former.

Gimnasia's defense isn't in tune with its forward line. Scarpone, the veteran goalkeeper, continues to be a valuable asset and knows how to assume the direction he exerts from his goal over his teammates, showing them the way. But the attacking quintet is actually good. Curell is the only veteran of the five, and that's why the combination isn't more effective. In contrast, his four teammates are young, enthusiastic, and play well.

No one can dispute that. Given the current state of Boca's forward line, it's no better than its opponent from Sunday. Varallo and Morgada are two men who know their football. Malianni has a clear vision of the goal, and Díaz is another capable player. Combined with their power, that line has played in this tournament with the incentive of winning the championship.

For many, Gimnasia y Esgrima de La Plata did not deserve to win their match against Boca Juniors. The argument put forward for this is chance. Boca's goalkeeper faced imminent danger, and in two of them, the agile La Plata players managed to achieve their goals. Boca, in turn, provoked similar situations, albeit more frequently, without managing to beat Scarpone, as his only fall was due to an unfortunate play by back Di Gianno. This means that the losers did not score a single goal. However, all things being equal, Boca should have won. Despite what has been said, let us recognize that Gimnasia's two goals were legally awarded and were not due to errors by the young goalkeeper Mena, as any other goalkeeper, put in his position, would have done no more.
