= 1923 Argentine Primera División finals =

1923 Primera División finals
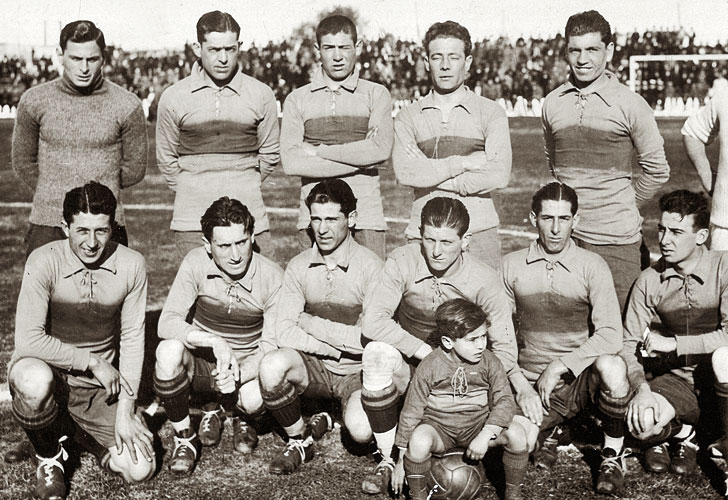
- A Boca Juniors team of 1924, year of the finals
- Event: 1923 Primera División
Boca Juniors	Huracán

First leg
Boca Juniors	Huracán
3	0
- Date: 16 March 1924
- Venue: Sportivo Barracas, Buenos Aires
- Referee: Pérez

Second leg
Huracán	Boca Juniors
2	0
- Date: 30 March 1924
- Venue: Sportivo Barracas, Buenos Aires
- Referee: Pérez

Playoff
Huracán	Boca Juniors
0	0
- (a.e.t.)
- Date: 6 April 1924
- Venue: GEBA, Buenos Aires
- Referee: Pérez

1923 Argentine Primera División 2nd. playoff
- Event: 1923 Primera División
Boca Juniors	Huracán
2	0
- Date: 27 April 1924
- Venue: Sportivo Barracas, Buenos Aires
- Man of the Match: Alfredo Garasini
- Referee: Villarino

The 1923 Argentine Primera División finals was a series of final matches to define the 1923 Primera División championship. It was played between Boca Juniors and Huracán after both teams finished in the first position at the end of the season.

It was the 6th time a Primera División title had to be defined through a tiebreaker match (other precedents had been occurred in 1891, 1897, 1911, 1912, 1913, and 1915) and was also the first Primera División final contested by both, Boca Juniors and Huracán.

The series were played in March and April 1924. Boca Juniors won their 3rd league title after beating Huracán 2–0 in the fourth match.

== Qualified teams ==
Team	Previous finals app.
Boca Juniors	(none)
Huracán	(none)

Bold indicates winning years

=== Venues ===
Buenos Aires
Estadio Sportivo Barracas	Estadio GEBA
Capacity: **37,000**	Capacity: **12,133**

== Road to the final ==
Boca Juniors and Huracán finished the season equal on points (51 each) in the same position, although Boca Juniors had completed 30 matches and Huracán 29 due to the AFA having abruptly finished the competition. The third team, Sportivo Barracas, ranked 3rd with 38 points, but they had only completed 26 matches. Although Boca had a large goal difference (+68) above Huracán, the rules established that both teams had to play each other to define the 32nd. season of Primera División.

== The series ==
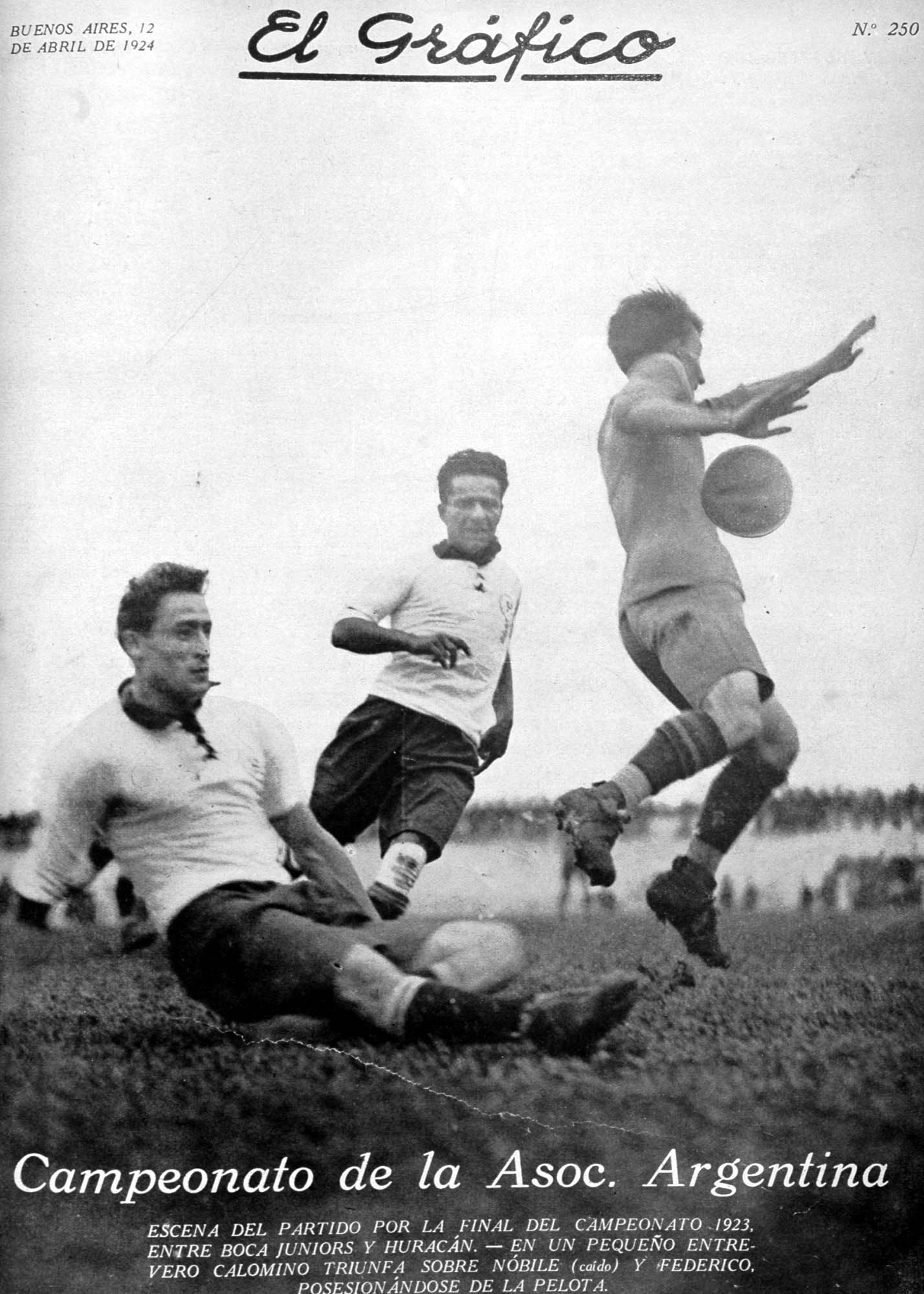
The first playoff (third match) covered by El Gráfico magazine

The championship was planned to be defined on a two-legged tie system played in a neutral venue (Estadio Sportivo Barracas). The first match was tough and Boca scored their first goal at the beginning of the second half through a free kick by Domingo Tarasconi. Dante Pertini scored the second goal at 18'. The great amount of fouls committed by players of Huracán forced Juan Pratto to leave the field. Antonio Cerrotti scored the third goal for Boca Juniors.

The second leg was won by Huracán 2–0, with goals by Adán Loizo and Cesáreo Onzari, both in the first half. Despite the goal difference in favor of Boca Juniors, the rules did not take it into account to determine a champion, so a playoff had to be held. The playoff match held in Estadio GEBA ended in a 0–0 draw that included a penalty kick missed by Tarasconi. A 30' extra time was played but the match had to be ended at 23' due to nightfall as stadiums in Argentina did not have lighting system by then.

Therefore the Association was forced to organise a fourth match to define the title, on April 27. With Sportivo Barracas as the venue again, Boca Juniors won the definitive match 2–0 (with two goals by Alfredo Garasini) to earn their third league title. Curious fact: the fourth match was played while the 1924 season (that had started on April 13) was in progress.

=== Match details ===
1923 Primera División Final
16 March 1924
First leg

Boca Juniors	3–0	Huracán
Tarasconi 49'; Pertini 65'; Cerroti 85'	Report

Sportivo Barracas
Referee: Pérez

30 March 1924
Second leg

Boca Juniors	0–2	Huracán
	Report	Loizo 10'; Onzari 76'

Sportivo Barracas
Referee: Pérez

6 April 1924
Playoff

Boca Juniors	0–0 (a.e.t.)	Huracán
	Report

Gimnasia y Esgrima (BA)
Referee: Pérez

27 April 1924
Playoff 2

Boca Juniors	2–0	Huracán
Garasini 59', 62'	Report

Sportivo Barracas
Referee: Villarino

**Boca Juniors**
**Huracán**

GK	(Argentina) Américo Tesoriere
DF	(Argentina) Ludovico Bidoglio
DF	(Argentina) Ramón Muttis
MF	(Argentina) Angel Médici
MF	(Argentina) Mario Busso
MF	(Argentina) Alfredo Elli
FW	(Argentina) Pedro Calomino
FW	(Argentina) Antonio Cerroti
FW	(Argentina) Alfredo Garasini
FW	(Argentina) Carmelo Pozzo
FW	(Argentina) Dante Pertini

GK	(Argentina) Vicente Marmo
DF	(Italy) Carlos Nóbile
DF	(Argentina) Juan F. Pratto
MF	(Argentina) Cayetano Federico
MF	(Argentina) Ramón Vázquez
MF	(Argentina) Juan B. Scursoni
FW	(Argentina) Adán Loizo
FW	(Argentina) Juan Rodríguez
FW	(Argentina) Vicente Chiarante
FW	(Argentina) Ángel Chiesa
FW	(Argentina) Cesáreo Onzari
