= List of Argentine Primera División top scorers =

This is a list of Argentine Primera División top scorers, that enumerates all players that have finished a season as top goalscorers in the top level of the Argentine football league system from 1891 (the year that the first championship was held) to date.

== All-time top scorers ==
The ranking includes Primera División tournaments from 1891 to date:

Pos.	Player	Career in Primera División	Goals	Matches	Avg.	Ref.
1	(Argentina) Ángel Labruna	1939–59	295	515	0.57	
2	(Paraguay) Arsenio Erico	1934–47	293	332	0.88	
3	(Argentina) Herminio Masantonio	1931–43, 1945	253	358	0.70	
4	(Argentina) Manuel Seoane	1921–32	249	299	0.83	
5	(Argentina) Roberto Cherro	1924–38	236	345	0.68	
6	(Argentina) Bernabé Ferreyra	1929–39	233	234	0.99	
7	(Argentina) Manuel Pelegrina	1938–55	231	490	0.47	
8	(Argentina) Martín Palermo	1993–2000, 2004–11	227	408	0.55	
9	(Argentina) José Sanfilippo	1953–63, 1966–67, 1972	226	330	0.68	
10	(Argentina) Ricardo Infante	1942–61	217	439	0.49	
11	(Argentina) Francisco Varallo	1928–39	216	282	0.76	
12	(Argentina) Oscar Más	1964–76, 1979, 1982, 1985	215	429	0.50	
13	(Argentina) Domingo Tarasconi	1921–31, 1934	208	289	0.71	
14	(Argentina) Carlos Bianchi	1967–73, 1980–84	206	324	0.64	
15	(Argentina) Miguel Brindisi	1967–1976, 1979–1983	194	441	0.44	
16	(Paraguay) Delfín Benítez Cáceres	1932–44	193	269	0.71	
17	(Argentina) José Manuel Moreno	1935–44, 1946–48, 1950, 1953	187	359	0.52	
18	(Argentina) Hugo Gottardi	1973–83, 1986–88	186	450	0.41	
19	(Argentina) Roque Avallay	1973–83, 1986–88	184	522	0.35	
20	(Argentina) Alberto Zozaya	1929–39	183	224	0.81	

== Top scorers by year ==
Below is the list of topscorers from 1891 to date:

Season	Player	Club	Goals	Matches
1891	(England) Frederick Archer	Buenos Aires and Rosario Railway	7	
1892	(No championship held)			
1893	(Scotland) William Leslie	Lomas	7	
1894	(England) James Gifford	Flores	7	
1895	(No records for this season)			
1896	(England) Thomas Fearnley Allen (Argentina) Juan Anderson	Flores; Lomas	7	
1897	(Scotland) William Stirling	Lomas	20	
1898	(England) Thomas Fearnley Allen	Lanùs AC	11	
1899	(England) Percy Hooton	Belgrano AC	3	
1900	(England) Spencer Leonard	BAEHS (Note: The Buenos Aires English High School changed its name to "Alumni" in 1901.)	8	
1901	(England) Herbert Dorning	Belgrano AC	5	
1902	(Argentina) Jorge Brown	Alumni	11	
1903	(Argentina) Jorge Brown (2)	Alumni	12	
1904	(Argentina) Alfredo Brown	Alumni	11	
1905	(Argentina) Tristán Gonzáles (Argentina) Carlos Lett	Estudiantes (BA); Alumni	12	
1906	(Argentina) Eliseo Brown (England) Percy Hooton (Argentina) Henry Lawrie (South Africa) Carlos Whalley	Alumni; Quilmes; Lomas; Belgrano AC	8	
1907	(Argentina) Eliseo Brown	Alumni	24	
1908	(Argentina) Eliseo Brown	Alumni	19	
1909	(Argentina) Eliseo Brown (4)	Alumni	17	
1910	(Argentina) Arnold Watson Hutton	Alumni	13	
1911	(Argentina) Ricardo Malbrán (Argentina) Ernesto Lett (Argentina) Antonio Piaggio	San Isidro; Alumni; Porteño	10	
1912	(Argentina) Alberto Ohaco	Racing Club	9	
1912 FAF (Note: The Federación Amateurs de Football (FAF) was a rival association that organized its own championships from 1912 to 1914.)	(Argentina) Ernesto Colla	Independiente	12	
1913	(Argentina) Alberto Ohaco	Racing	20	
1913 FAF	(Argentina) Guillermo Dannaher	Argentino (Q)	16	
1914	(Argentina) Alberto Ohaco	Racing	20	
1914 FAF	(Argentina) Norberto Carabelli	Hispano Argentino	11	
1915	(Argentina) Alberto Ohaco (4)	Racing	31	
1916	(Argentina) Marius Hiller	Gimnasia y Esgrima (BA)	16	
1917	(Argentina) Alberto Marcovecchio	Racing	18	
1918	(Argentina) Albérico Zabaleta (2)	Racing	13	
1919	(Argentina) Alfredo Garasini (Argentina) Alfredo Martín	Boca Juniors; Boca Juniors	6	
1919 AAm (Note: The Asociación Amateurs de Football (AAm) was a rival association that organized its own championships from 1919 to 1926.)	(Argentina) Alberto Marcovecchio (2)	Racing	16	
1920	(Argentina) Fausto Lucarelli	Banfield	15	
1920 AAm	(Argentina) Santiago Carreras	Vélez Sársfield	19	
1921	(Argentina) Guillermo Dannaher (2)	Huracán	23	
1921 AAm	(Argentina) Alberico Zabaleta	Racing	32	
1922	(Argentina) José Clarke (Argentina) Domingo Tarasconi	Sportivo Palermo; Boca Juniors	11	
1922 AAm	(Argentina) Manuel Seoane	Independiente	55	
1923	(Argentina) Domingo Tarasconi	Boca Juniors	40	
1923 AAm	(Argentina) Martín Barceló	Racing	15	
1924	(Argentina) Domingo Tarasconi	Boca Juniors	16	
1924 AAm	(Argentina) Fausto Lucarelli (2) (Argentina) Luis Ravaschino	Sportivo Buenos Aires; Independiente	15	
1925	(Argentina) José Gaslini	Chacarita Juniors	16	
1925 AAm	(Argentina) Alberto Bellomo	Estudiantes (LP)	16	
1926	(Argentina) Roberto Cherro	Boca Juniors	20	
1926 AAm	(Argentina) Manuel Seoane	Independiente	29	
1927	(Argentina) Domingo Tarasconi (3)	Boca Juniors	32	
1928	(Argentina) Roberto Cherro	Boca Juniors	32	
1929	(Argentina) José Cortecce (Argentina) Manuel Seoane (2)	San Lorenzo; Independiente	13	
1930	(Argentina) Roberto Cherro (3)	Boca Juniors	37	
1931 LAF (Note: The Liga Argentina de Football (LAF) was a dissident league that organised the first professional championships from 1931 to 1934. In 1935 it merged with the official AFA league (that remained amateur). As a result, all the AFA teams were relegated to the second division.)	(Argentina) Alberto Zozaya	Estudiantes	33	34
1931	(Argentina) José Ciancio	Almagro	14	
1932 LAF	(Argentina) Bernabé Ferreyra	River Plate	43	35
1932	(Argentina) Juan Carlos Irurieta	All Boys	23	
1933 LAF	(Argentina) Francisco Varallo	Boca Juniors	34	34
1933	(Argentina) Alfonso Lorenzo	Barracas Central	16	
1934 LAF	(Argentina) Evaristo Barrera	Racing	34	39
1934	(Argentina) Pedro Maseda (Argentina) Domingo Tarasconi	Argentino de Quilmes; Gral. San Martín (Note: Some sources say San Martín de Tucumán which is incorrect. The team where Tarasconi played were a club located in General San Martín Partido of Greater Buenos Aires.)	16	
1935	(Argentina) Agustín Cosso	Vélez Sársfield	33	34
1936 (CH) (Note: Copa de Honor)	(Argentina) Alberto Zozaya (2)	Estudiantes (LP)	16	
1936 (CC) (Note: Copa Campeonato)	(Argentina) Evaristo Barrera (2)	Racing	19	
1937	(Paraguay) Arsenio Erico	Independiente	47	34
1938	(Paraguay) Arsenio Erico	Independiente	43	34
1939	(Paraguay) Arsenio Erico (3)	Independiente	40	34
1940	(Paraguay) Delfín Benítez Cáceres (Spain) Isidro Lángara	Racing Club; San Lorenzo	33; 33	34; 34
1941	(Argentina) José Canteli	Newell's Old Boys	30	30
1942	(Argentina) (Italy) Rinaldo Martino	San Lorenzo	25	30
1943	(Argentina) Luis Arrieta (Argentina) Ángel Labruna (Argentina) Raúl Frutos	Lanús; River Plate; Platense	23; 23; 23	30; 30; 30
1944	(Paraguay) Atilio Mellone	Huracán	26	30
1945	(Argentina) Ángel Labruna (2)	River Plate	25	30
1946	(Argentina) Mario Boyé	Boca Juniors	24	30
1947	(Argentina) (Spain) Alfredo Di Stéfano	River Plate	27	30
1948	(Argentina) Benjamín Santos	Rosario Central	21	30
1949	(Argentina) Llamil Simes (Argentina) Juan José Pizzuti	Racing Club; Banfield	26; 26	34; 34
1950	(Argentina) Mario Papa	San Lorenzo	24	34
1951	(Argentina) Santiago Vernazza	River Plate	22	24
1952	(Argentina) (Italy) Eduardo Ricagni	Huracán	28	34
1953	(Argentina) Juan José Pizzuti (Argentina) Juan Armando Benavídez	Racing Club; San Lorenzo	22; 22	30
1954	(Paraguay) Ángel Berni (Argentina) Norberto Conde (Argentina) José Borello	San Lorenzo; Vélez Sársfield; Boca Juniors	19; 19; 19	30; 30; 30
1955	(Argentina) Oscar Massei	Rosario Central	21	30
1956	(Argentina) Juan A. Castro (Argentina) Ernesto Grillo	Rosario Central; Independiente	17; 17	30; 30
1957	(Argentina) Roberto Zárate	River Plate	22	30
1958	(Argentina) José Sanfilippo	San Lorenzo	28	30
1959	(Argentina) José Sanfilippo	San Lorenzo	31	30
1960	(Argentina) José Sanfilippo	San Lorenzo	34	30
1961	(Argentina) José Sanfilippo (4)	San Lorenzo	26	30
1962	(Argentina) Luis Artime	River Plate	25	26
1963	(Argentina) Luis Artime	River Plate	24	23
1964	(Argentina) Héctor Rodolfo Veira	San Lorenzo	17	30
1965	(Argentina) Juan Carlos Carone	Vélez Sársfield	19	34
1966	(Argentina) Luis Artime	Independiente	23	38
1967 Met	(Argentina) Bernardo Acosta	Lanús	18	22
1967 Nac	(Argentina) Luis Artime (4)	Independiente	11	15
1968 Met	(Argentina) Alfredo Obberti	Los Andes	13	22
1968 Nac	(Argentina) Omar Wehbe	Vélez Sársfield	13	17
1969 Met	(Brazil) Wálter Machado	Racing Club	14	23
1969 Nac	(Argentina) Rodolfo Fischer (Argentina) Carlos Bulla	San Lorenzo; Platense	14; 14	19; 17
1970 Met	(Argentina) Oscar Más	River Plate	16	20
1970 Nac	(Argentina) Carlos Bianchi	Vélez Sársfield	18	20
1971 Met	(Argentina) Carlos Bianchi	Vélez Sársfield	36	36
1971 Nac	(Argentina) Alfredo Obberti (2) (Argentina) José Artemio Luñiz	Newell's Old Boys; Juventud Antoniana	10; 10	15; 15
1972 Met	(Argentina) Miguel Ángel Brindisi	Huracán	21	34
1972 Nac	(Argentina) Carlos Manuel Morete	River Plate	14	15
1973 Met	(Argentina) Oscar Más (2) (Argentina) Hugo Curioni (Argentina) Ignacio Peña	River Plate; Boca Juniors; Estudiantes (LP)	17; 17; 17	32; 32; 32
1973 Nac	(Argentina) Juan Gómez Voglino	Atlanta	18	16
1974 Met	(Argentina) Carlos Manuel Morete	River Plate	18	18
1974 Nac	(Argentina) Mario Kempes	Rosario Central	25	25
1975 Met	(Argentina) Héctor Horacio Scotta	San Lorenzo	28	38
1975 Nac	(Argentina) Héctor Horacio Scotta (2)	San Lorenzo	32	23
1976 Met	(Argentina) Mario Kempes (2)	Rosario Central	21	33
1976 Nac	(Argentina) Norberto Eresumo (Argentina) Luis Ludueña (Argentina) Víctor Marchetti	San Lorenzo; Talleres; Unión de Santa Fe	12; 12; 12	20; 22; 21
1977 Met	(Argentina) Carlos Álvarez	Argentinos Juniors	27	44
1977 Nac	(Argentina) Alfredo Letanú	Estudiantes	13	16
1978 Met	(Argentina) Diego Maradona (Argentina) Luis Andreuchi	Argentinos Juniors; Quilmes	22; 22	40; 40
1978 Nac	(Argentina) José Omar Reinaldi	Talleres	18	18
1979 Met	(Argentina) Diego Maradona (Argentina) Sergio Fortunato	Argentinos Juniors; Estudiantes	14; 14	19
1979 Nac	(Argentina) Diego Maradona	Argentinos Juniors	12	14
1980 Met	(Argentina) Diego Maradona	Argentinos Juniors	25	38
1980 Nac	(Argentina) Diego Maradona (5)	Argentinos Juniors	18	18
1981 Met	(Argentina) Raúl Chaparro	Instituto	20	34
1981 Nac	(Argentina) Carlos Bianchi (3)	Vélez Sársfield	15	20
1982 Met	(Argentina) Carlos Manuel Morete (3)	Independiente	20	36
1982 Nac	(Argentina) Miguel Ángel Juárez	Ferro Carril Oeste	22	22
1982 Met	(Argentina) Víctor Ramos	Newell's Old Boys	30	38
1983 Nac	(Argentina) Armando Husillos	Loma Negra	11	14
1984 Met	(Uruguay) Enzo Francescoli	River Plate	24	36
1984 Nac	(Argentina) Pedro Pablo Pasculli	Argentinos Juniors	9	10
1985 Nac	(Argentina) Jorge Comas	Vélez Sársfield	12	15
1985-86	(Uruguay) Enzo Francescoli	River Plate	25	36
1986-87	(Argentina) Omar Palma	Rosario Central	20	38
1987-88	(Argentina) José Luis Rodríguez	Deportivo Español	18	38
1988-89	(Argentina) Oscar Dertycia (Argentina) Néstor Raúl Gorosito	Argentinos Juniors; San Lorenzo	20; 20	38; 38
1989-90	(Argentina) Ariel Cozzoni	Newell's Old Boys	23	38
1990-91	(Argentina) Esteban González	Vélez Sársfield	18	38
1991 Ap	(Argentina) Ramón Díaz	River Plate	14	17
1992 Cl	(Argentina) Darío Scotto (Argentina) Diego Latorre	Platense; Boca Juniors	9; 9	16; 19
1992 Ap	(Argentina) Alberto Acosta	San Lorenzo	12	19
1993 Cl	(Uruguay) Rubén Da Silva	River Plate	13	18
1993 Ap	(Uruguay) Sergio Martínez	Boca Juniors	12	19
1994 Cl	(Argentina) Marcelo Espina (Argentina) Hernán Crespo	Platense; River Plate	11; 11	18; 19
1994 Ap	(Uruguay) Enzo Francescoli (3)	River Plate	12	16
1995 Cl	(Argentina) José Oscar Flores	Vélez Sársfield	14	17
1995 Ap	(Argentina) José Luis Calderón	Estudiantes (LP)	13	18
1996 Cl	(Argentina) Ariel López	Lanús	13	18
1996 Ap	(Argentina) Gustavo Reggi	Ferro Carril Oeste	11	17
1997 Cl	(Uruguay) Sergio Martínez (2)	Boca Juniors	15	15
1997 Ap	(Uruguay) Rubén Da Silva (2)	Rosario Central	15	17
1998 Cl	(Argentina) Roberto Sosa	Gimnasia y Esgrima (LP)	16	19
1998 Ap	(Argentina) Martín Palermo	Boca Juniors	20	19
1999 Cl	(Argentina) José Luis Calderón (2)	Independiente	17	18
1999 Ap	(Argentina) Javier Saviola	River Plate	15	18
2000 Cl	(Argentina) Esteban Fuertes	Colón	17	18
2000 Ap	(Colombia) Juan Pablo Ángel	River Plate	13	18
2001 Cl	(Argentina) Bernardo Romeo	San Lorenzo	15	16
2001 Ap	(Argentina) Martín Cardetti	River Plate	17	19
2002 Cl	(Argentina) Fernando Cavenaghi	River Plate	15	19
2002 Ap	(Argentina) Andrés Silvera	Independiente	16	19
2003 Cl	(Argentina) Luciano Figueroa	Rosario Central	17	19
2003 Ap	(Argentina) Ernesto Farías	Estudiantes	12	16
2004 Cl	(Argentina) Rolando Zárate	Vélez Sársfield	13	17
2004 Ap	(Argentina) Lisandro López	Racing	12	19
2005 Cl	(Argentina) Mariano Pavone	Estudiantes	16	19
2005 Ap	(Argentina) Javier Cámpora	Tiro Federal	13	19
2006 Cl	(Uruguay) Gonzalo Vargas	Gimnasia y Esgrima (LP)	12	18
2006 Ap	(Argentina) Mauro Zárate (Argentina) Rodrigo Palacio	Vélez Sársfield; Boca Juniors	12	19; 20
2007 Cl	(Argentina) Martín Palermo (2)	Boca Juniors	11	16
2007 Ap	(Argentina) Germán Denis	Independiente	18	19
2008 Cl	(Argentina) Darío Cvitanich	Banfield	13	16
2008 Ap	(Argentina) José Sand	Lanús	15	19
2009 Cl	(Argentina) José Sand	Lanús	13	19
2009 Ap	(Uruguay) Santiago Silva	Banfield	14	12
2010 Cl	(Argentina) Mauro Boselli	Estudiantes (LP)	13	14
2010 Ap	(Uruguay) Santiago Silva (2) (Argentina) Denis Stracqualursi	Vélez Sársfield; Tigre	11; 11	19; 19
2011 Cl	(Argentina) Javier Cámpora (Colombia) Teófilo Gutiérrez	Huracán; Racing	11; 11	19; 16
2011 Ap	(Argentina) Rubén Ramírez	Godoy Cruz	12	17
2012 Cl	(Argentina) Carlos Luna	Tigre	12	18
2012 In	(Argentina) Facundo Ferreyra (Argentina) Ignacio Scocco	Vélez Sársfield; Newell's Old Boys	13	15; 17
2013 Fi	(Argentina) Ignacio Scocco (2) (Argentina) Emanuel Gigliotti	Newell's Old Boys; Colón	11	16; 18
2013 In	(Argentina) César Pereyra	Belgrano	10	
2014 Fi	(Argentina) Mauro Zárate (2)	Vélez Sársfield	13	
2014 Tr	(Argentina) Lucas Pratto	Vélez Sársfield	11	17
2014 Tr	(Argentina) Maxi Rodríguez	Newell's Old Boys	11	17
2014 Tr	(Argentina) Silvio Romero	Lanús	11	19
2015	(Argentina) Marco Ruben	Rosario Central	21	30
2016	(Argentina) José Sand (3)	Lanús	15	19
2016–17	(Argentina) Darío Benedetto	Boca Juniors	21	25
2017–18	(Uruguay) Santiago García	Godoy Cruz	17	26
2018–19	(Argentina) Lisandro López (2)	Racing	17	23
2019–20	(Argentina) Silvio Romero (2)	Independiente	12	20
2019–20	(Colombia) Rafael Santos Borré	River Plate	12	20
2021	(Argentina) Julián Álvarez	River Plate	18	21
2022	(Argentina) (Italy) Mateo Retegui	Tigre	19	27
2023	(Uruguay) Michael Santos	Talleres (C)	13	24
2023	(Argentina) Pablo Vegetti	Belgrano	13	27
2024	(Argentina) Franco Jara	Belgrano	13	21
2025 Ap	(Argentina) Tomás Molina	Argentinos Juniors	10	

== Records and statistics ==
- The youngest player ever to become top scorer in the Argentine Primera was Diego Maradona in the 1978 Metropolitano tournament at the age of 17.
- Héctor Scotta scored the most goals in a single calendar year, with 60 in 1975.
- Arsenio Erico is the only player to score more than 40 goals in a single tournament, he managed the feat twice in 1937, with 47 goals and in 1938 with 43 goals.
- Juan Taverna is the player who scored the most goals in a single match (7) when his club, Banfield, thrashed Bahía Blanca's Puerto Comercial 13–1 at Estadio Florencio Sola on October 6, 1974.
- José Luis Chilavert is the only goalkeeper to have scored 3 goals in a match. He set the record on November 28, 1999, when Vélez Sarsfield beat Ferro Carril Oeste 6–1 at José Amalfitani Stadium in the 1999 Apertura. This was not only an Argentine but a worldwide record for a goalkeeper.
- Clelio Caucia of Vélez Sarsfield became the first goalkeeper to have scored in Argentine football when he scored a penalty kick v Quilmes on June 24, 1924.
- Carlos Seppaquercia of Gimnasia y Esgrima LP set the record for the fastest goal in a match, scoring on 5 seconds v Huracán, on March 18, 1979, at Estadio Juan Carmelo Zerillo. The match ended 1–1.
- Eduardo Maglioni scored 3 goals within 1 minute and 51 seconds playing for Independiente v Gimnasia y Esgrima LP at "La Doble Visera" Stadium in a 1973 Metropolitano match on March 18, 1973.
- José Sanfilippo (1958–1961) and Diego Maradona (1978–1980) are the only players to have been top scorers on four consecutive seasons.
- Pedro Pasculli (1984 Nacional), and Diego Latorre and Darío Scotto (both in 1992 Clausura) became top scorers with the fewest goals, they only needed to score 9 times to claim their titles.
- Carlos Bianchi holds the record for the longest period in the top scorers list, his first came in the 1971 Metro and his last came in 1981 Nacional, a gap of 11 years.
- Bianchi also holds the record for the longest gap between titles, he waited nearly ten years between his 1971 Metropolitano and his 1981 Nacional titles.
- Martín Palermo holds the record for goals in a season of 19 matches. His 20 goals in the 1998 Apertura also made him the first player to average more than 1 goal per match since Juan Gómez Voglino (who is also the all-time Atlanta top scorer) in 1973.
- Paraguayan Arsenio Erico and Uruguayan Enzo Francescoli are the two foreigners to have been top scorer of Argentina on the most occasions. Erico was the top scorer three consecutive seasons (1937 to 1939), while Francescoli was the top scorer in the 1984 Metropolitano, the 1985–86 season, and in the 1994 Apertura.
- Rolando Zárate and Mauro Zárate are the only brothers to have both been top scorer in the Argentine Primera (2004 Clausura and 2006 Apertura respectively).
- When Lisandro López claimed the 2004 Apertura title, he became the first Racing Club player to be top scorer in 35 years.
- In 2009 José Sand became the first player to become top scorer in consecutive tournaments since Diego Maradona in 1980.
