= Oscar Más =

Argentine footballer

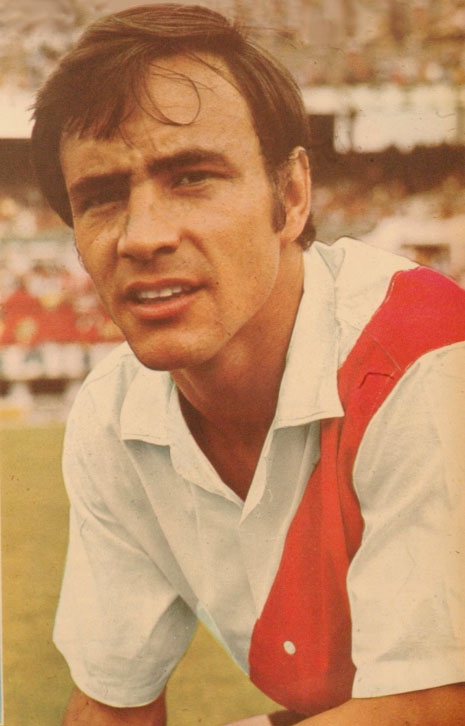
- Más in 1969, during his first run on River Plate.

Personal information
- Full name: Oscar Antonio Más
- Date of birth: 29 October 1946 (age 80)
- Place of birth: Villa Ballester, Argentina
- Position: Forward

Youth career
- Mariano Moreno de Junín

Senior career*
Years	Team	Apps	(Gls)
1964–1973	River Plate	309	(169)
1973–1974	Real Madrid	24	(11)
1974–1977	River Plate	73	(29)
1977–1978	América de Cali	68	(38)
1979	Quilmes	7	(3)
1980–1981	Defensores de Belgrano	57	(40)
1982	Sarmiento	18	(6)
1982	Mariano Moreno	14	(7)
1983	El Porvenir		
1984	Defensores de Belgrano		
1985	Huracán Las Heras de Mendoza	8	(1)
1986–1987	Talleres (RE)	5	(2)

International career
1965–1972	Argentina	37	(10)
- * Club domestic league appearances and goals

Oscar Antonio "Pinino" Más (born October 29, 1946) is an Argentine former professional football striker. He played the majority of his career for River Plate where he is the club's second highest goalscorer of all time. Más was a fundamental part of the River team that ended the 18-year title drought, he also played for La Liga club Real Madrid and the Argentina national team.

== Club career ==
He was born in the city of Villa Ballester in the Buenos Aires Province of Argentina. He made his debut in the Argentine First Division at the age of 17 in 1964, with River Plate. He would go on to win two titles with River Plate, both the titles contested in 1975. He was twice the top scorer in the Argentine Primera and once top scorer in the Copa Libertadores. In total, he scored 199 goals in 382 games for River, being their second-most prolific scorer behind Angel Labruna.

Más also played for Real Madrid for a spell, América de Cali in Colombia, Quilmes, Sarmiento, Mariano Moreno, El Porvenir, Defensores de Belgrano, Huracán Las Heras de Mendoza and Talleres de Remedios de Escalada in Argentina.

By the end of his career he had scored 215 goals in 329 games in the Argentine Primera, making him the 7th highest scoring player since the professional era began in 1931.

== International career ==
Más represented Argentina on 37 occasions between 1965 and 1972 including at the 1966 World Cup. He scored 10 goals in his international career.

== Investigative journalism and lawsuit for fraud ==
On Monday June 29, 2009, Oscar Más was convicted to a six months suspended sentence for fraud, during an abbreviated trial after being arrested the previous day while he was voting in a San Isidro school, in the northern area of Greater Buenos Aires, on the occasion of the parliamentary elections of June 2009. The former player had an arrest warrant for breaking legal action under a suspension of trial by which he was benefited on a fraud lawsuit, as legal sources stated.

Más was arrested in a police station and was transferred the next day to the warden of the Palace of Justice to appear before the Oral Criminal Court No. 7 that sought his arrest, by judges Daniel Morin, Gustavo Valle and Juan Giúdice Bravo. The detention order was made because he did not comply with probation that justice had issued in December 2006 not to go to trial because of the complaint against him.

The former player should have reported periodically to the board of trustees of the Freed, which he failed to do, and he wasn't located in the home that he had fixed so the court declared his rebellion and ordered his arrest. However, until the decision is final, he shall remain free.

On its issue of Friday July 10, 2009, the investigative news program Documentos América, issued by the channel América TV, revealed a hidden camera which presented Oscar Más demanding money from parents of children, in exchange for providing the latest a precarious training and eventual admission to the lower divisions of River Plate.

== Honours ==
Real Madrid

- Copa del Rey: 1973-74

River Plate

- Primera Division Argentina :1975 Metropolitano, 1975 Nacional
- Copa Libertadores runner-up: 1976

Argentina

- Copa América runner-up: 1967

Individual

- Argentine Primera División top scorer: 1970 Metropolitano, 1973 Metropolitano
- Copa Libertadores top scorer: 1970
