= Juan Taverna =

Argentine footballer

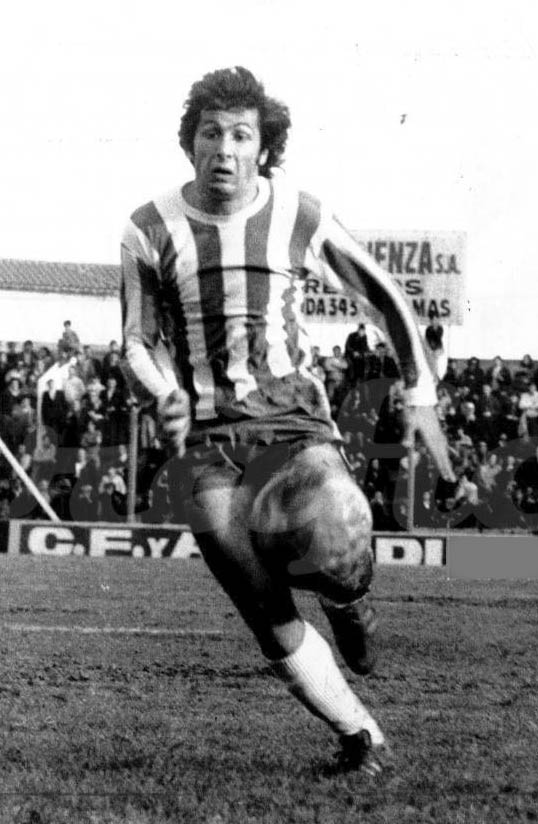
- Taverna playing for Banfield

Personal information
- Date of birth: 13 April 1948
- Place of birth: Veinticinco de Mayo, Buenos Aires
- Date of death: 7 November 2014 (aged 66)
- Place of death: Veinticinco de Mayo, Buenos Aires
- Position: Forward

Senior career*
Years	Team	Apps	(Gls)
1968–1971	Estudiantes (LP)	47	(20)
1972–1975	Banfield	24	(56)
1976	Boca Juniors	28	(11)
1977–1978	Gimnasia y Esgrima (LP)	30	(4)
- * Club domestic league appearances and goals

Juan Alberto Taverna (13 April 1948 – 7 November 2014) was an Argentine former footballer. Taverna is regarded as the first (and only to date) to have scored seven goals in a single match in the 1974 Campeonato Nacional.

== Career ==
Born in Veinticinco de Mayo, Buenos Aires, Taverna played most of his club football in Argentina, with brief spells at Real Murcia (Spain) and C.D. Veracruz (Mexico). Taverna was a dominant striker, scoring 77 goals in 173 competitive matches. Taverna's highlighted moment came in 1974 when he scored seven goals the day that Banfield thrashed Puerto Comercial 13–1 in the 1974 Campeonato Nacional. That outstanding mark still remains as record in Argentine football competitions.

Taverna began his career with Estudiantes de La Plata, where he would win three consecutive Copa Libertadores titles. He also played for Club Atlético Banfield where he scored an incredible 56 goals in 56 matches before moving to Boca Juniors where he won the 1976 Argentine Primera División. He finished his career with Club de Gimnasia y Esgrima La Plata.

== Doping controversy ==
On March 16, 1975, Taverna was found guilty in a doping test after a match vs River Plate (Banfield lost 2–1). It was also the first registered case in the country. As a result, Taverna was banned for one year, although seven months later the Associacion revoked the suspension due to anomaly in the urine sample. Taverna returned to official competitions in November 1975

== Death ==
Taverna died in Buenos Aires on 7 November 2014. He had suffered a stroke in 1999, which paralysed part of his body.
