= José María Silvero =

Argentine footballer (1931–2010)

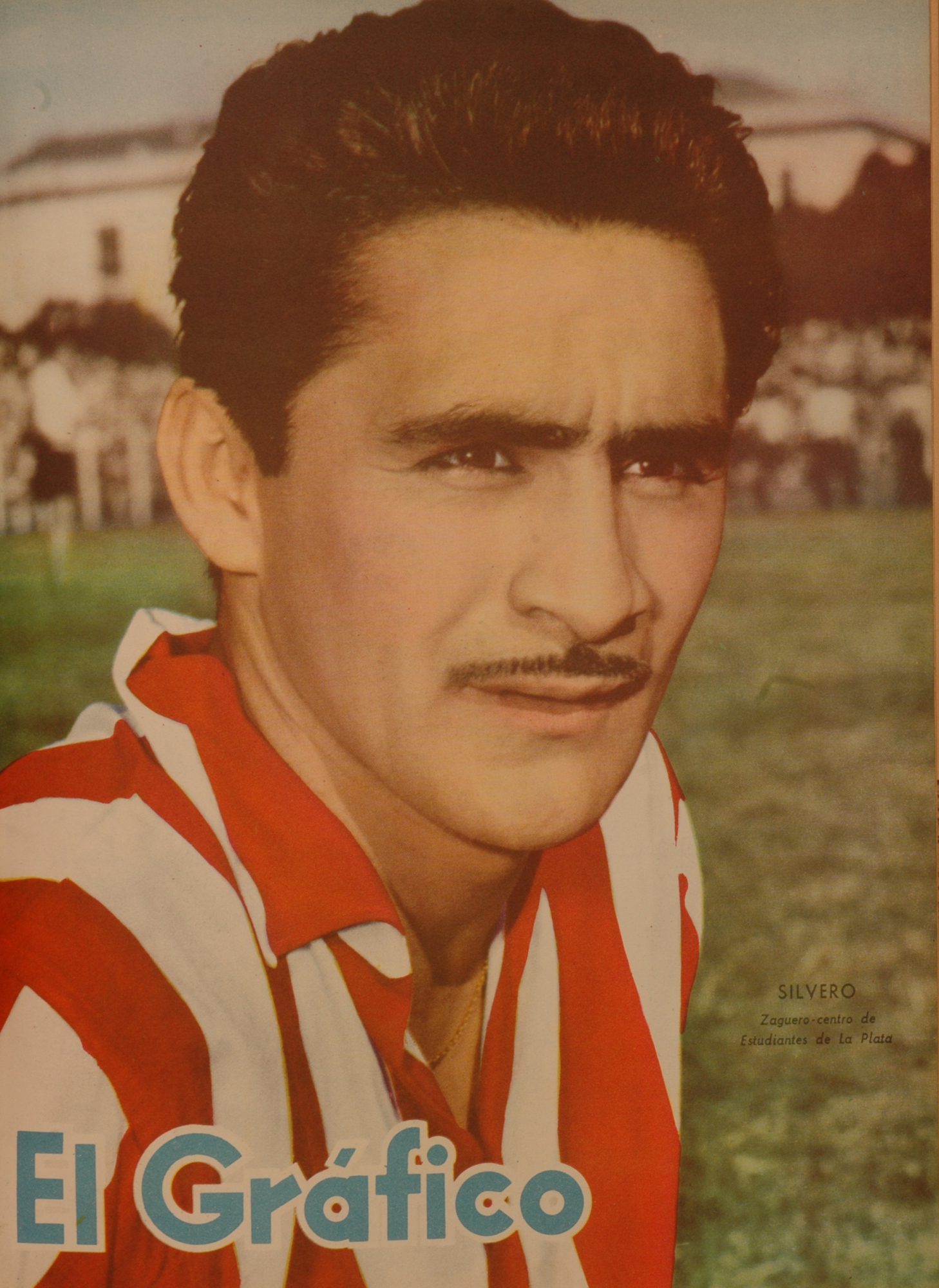
- Silvero on the cover of El Gráfico in 1958

Personal information
- Full name: José María Silvero
- Date of birth: 21 September 1931
- Place of birth: Corrientes Province, Argentina
- Date of death: 2 August 2010 (aged 78)
- Place of death: La Plata, Argentina
- Position: Defender

Senior career*
Years	Team	Apps	(Gls)
1952–1961	Estudiantes	198	(1)
1962–1966	Boca Juniors	103	(0)
1967	Chicago Spurs	1	(0)

Managerial career
- 1969: Defensores de Cambaceres
- 1969: Atlanta
- 1970–1971: Boca Juniors
- 1972: Estudiantes
- 1972–1973: Colón
- 1974: Atlanta
- 1974–1975: Emelec
- 1976: Rosario Central
- 1977: Lanús
- 1979: Belgrano
- 1979: Unión Española
- 1985: Temperley
- 1996–1997: Huracán Corrientes
- * Club domestic league appearances and goals

José María Silvero (21 September 1931 – 2 August 2010) was an Argentine professional football player and coach.

== Career ==
Silvero played with Estudiantes de La Plata (198 matches) and with Boca Juniors (103 matches). He played in the NPSL for the Chicago Spurs in 1967.

As a player of Boca Juniors, he served as advisor for Club Atlético Estrella. Upon retirement he managed several teams, most notably Boca Juniors, which he guided to the Nacional 1970 first division title.

Silvero managed other clubs in Argentina: Defensores de Cambaceres (before Boca), Rosario Central, Estudiantes de la Plata, Atlanta, Colón, and Lanús. Outside Argentina he managed Club Sport Emelec in Ecuador, and Unión Española in Chile.

After quitting management, he was the general coordinator of the "Osvaldo Zubeldía" management school in La Plata.

== Honours ==
=== As player ===
Estudiantes

- Second Division: 1954

Boca Juniors

- Argentine Primera División: 1962, 1964, 1965

=== As coach ===
Boca Juniors

- Nacional 1970

Lanús

- Second Division: 1976
