= Luis Andreuchi =

Argentine footballer

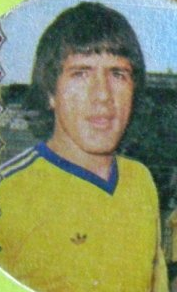

Personal information
- Full name: Luis Antonio Andreuchi
- Date of birth: 17 September 1955 (age 71)
- Place of birth: Monte Buey, Argentina
- Position: Striker

Senior career*
Years	Team	Apps	(Gls)
1973–1975	Altos Hornos Zapla		
1976–1977	Rosario Central	68	(14)
1978–1980	Quilmes	85	(44)
1980–1981	Panathinaikos	18	(4)
1981–1983	Ferro Carril Oeste	43	(6)
1984	Unión de Santa Fe	21	(3)
1985	Quilmes	22	(11)
1986	Banfield	4	(1)
1986	Renato Cesarini	6	(1)
1986	Cristal Caldas		
1987	Almirante Brown	1	(0)
1987–1988	Argentino de Rosario	3	(1)
- * Club domestic league appearances and goals as of 26 August 2017

Luis Antonio Andreuchi (born 17 September 1955 in Monte Buey) is a retired football player from Argentina.

He played as a forward and he began his career from Altos Hornos Zapla. He has won 2 times the Argentine Primera División as a player of Quilmes and Ferro Carril Oeste. He was the top scorer in the 1978 Argentine Primera División scoring 22 goals in 40 matches equalizing with Diego Maradona.

== Titles ==
Quilmes Atlético Club

- Primera División Argentina: 1978

Club Ferro Carril Oeste

- Primera División Argentina: 1982

== Honours ==
Quilmes Atlético Club

- Top scorer - Primera División Argentina: 1978
