= Ángel Labruna =

Argentine footballer (1918–1983)

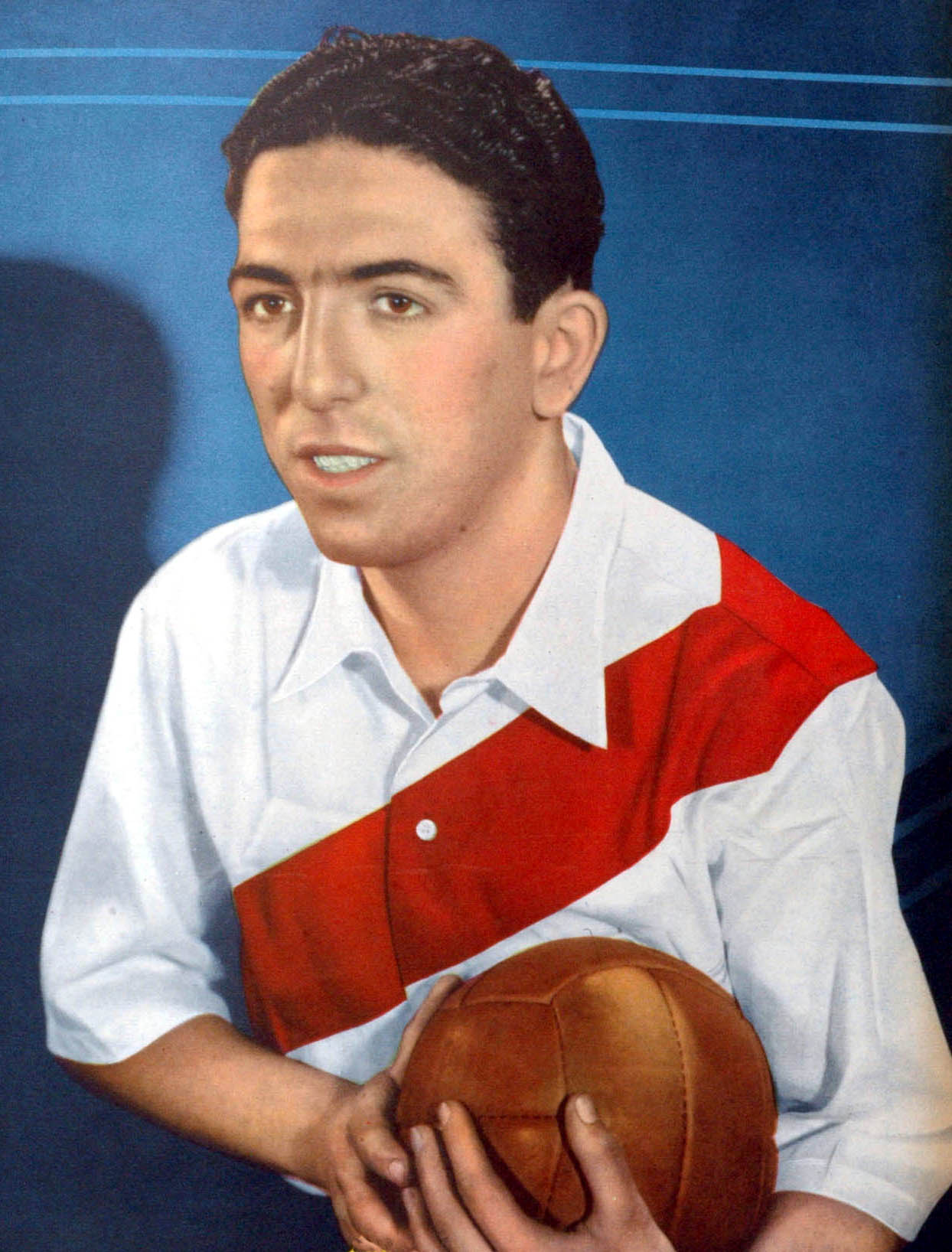
- Labruna in 1940

Personal information
- Full name: Ángel Amadeo Labruna
- Date of birth: 28 September 1918
- Place of birth: Buenos Aires, Argentina
- Date of death: 19 September 1983 (aged 64)
- Place of death: Buenos Aires, Argentina
- Height: 1.71 m (5 ft 7 in)
- Position: Forward

Youth career
- ?–1932: Club Barrio Parque
- 1932–1939: River Plate

Senior career*
| Years | Team | Apps | (Gls) |
| 1939–1959 | River Plate | 515 | (295) |
| 1960 | Rangers de Talca | 4 | (1) |
| 1960 | Rampla Juniors | 16 | (4) |
| 1961 | Platense | 2 | (0) |
| Total | | 537 | (300) |

International career
| 1942–1958 | Argentina | 37 | (17) |

Managerial career
- 1968–1970: River Plate
- 1971–1972: Rosario Central
- 1973: Racing Club
- 1974: Talleres de Córdoba
- 1975–1981: River Plate
- * Club domestic league appearances and goals

Ángel Amadeo Labruna (28 September 1918 – 19 September 1983) was an Argentine footballer and coach who played as a forward. With 323 goals scored in official matches, which include 295 league goals, Labruna is the all-time top scorer of Primera División. Labruna was also part of the celebrated River Plate offense, nicknamed La Máquina (The Machine), and he was considered one of the best South-American footballers of his generation. In his career, Labruna scored 564 goals.

== Early life ==
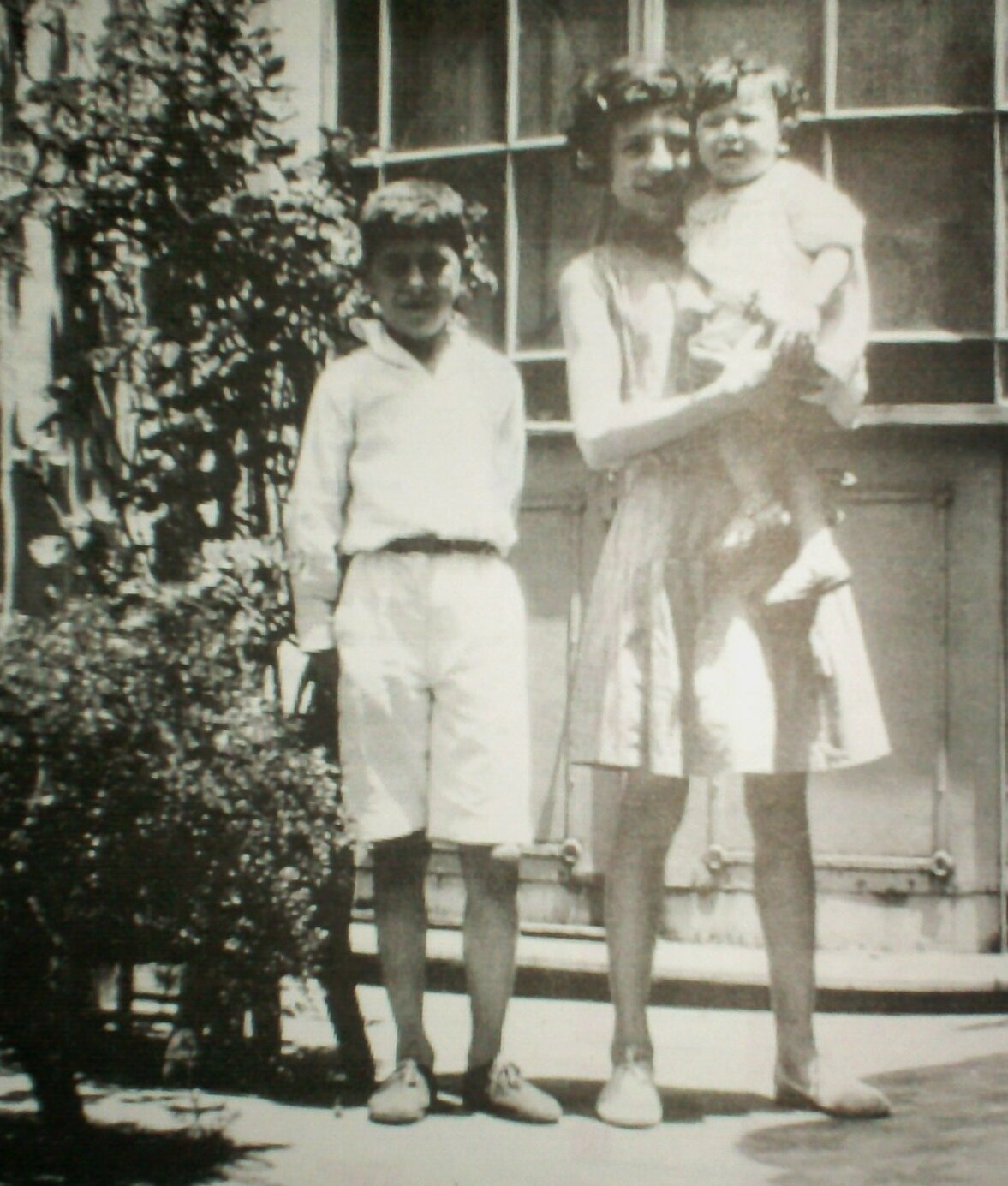
Photo of the Labruna siblings, at the left is Ángel while at the right is his older sister Nélida holding his younger brother Eduardo Fernando.

Labruna was born on 28 September 1918 at the Palermo barrio in Buenos Aires, growing up in his house located at Las Heras 2871 street. His father, Ángelo, was an Italian immigrant from Avellino who exited the country due to the First World War along with his father Gaetano and his two brothers. Ángelo started working as a barber in his youth and as a clockmaker in Palermo, over the years he would marry Amalia Cavatorta, her neighbour. Labruna was the secondborn child of Amalia and Ángelo, growing up with her older sister Nélida and his younger brother Eduardo Fernando. Ángelo wanted Labruna to work as a clockmaker, however Labruna hated clocks and used to escape to play association football in the streets. After a while, Labruna convinced Ángelo along with his mother to support him. At school he did well and took interest in drawing, and studied to be a builder but quit with two years left to play association football. As Labruna had a small rib cage, Ángelo signed him up for a membership River Plate to do gymnastics and improve his physic in November 1928.

== Youth career ==
=== Club Barrio Parque ===
To get him to stop playing in the streets, Ángelo signed him up to play in a local club called Club Barrio Parque. As the club was not affiliated with any competitions, they only played exhibition games against other clubs. Labruna played in the sixth division of the club on Saturdays from age 12 to 14 as the captain.

=== River Plate ===
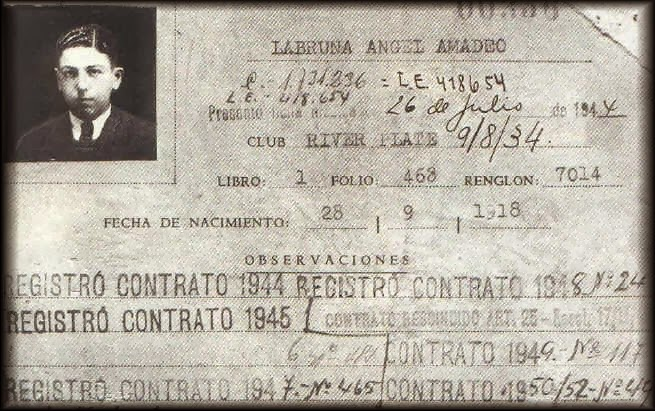
Labruna's River Plate youth contract in 1934

After a small talk with Labruna during a basketball game, then-vice-president Antonio Liberti founded River Plate's sixth division and all of Club Barrio Parque players would switch to play for the club. River Plate striker Buzzurru tested them out, they played as a warm-up for a Second Division match and after the match, the club officially signed Labruna in 1932, playing as an inside-right. In 1935, he was promoted to the morning fourth division team. In 1936, Labruna was playing basketball at the fourth and second division and was close debuting as a player in River Plate's first-team, however the club's Executive Committee forced him to decide between playing association football and basketball as he was starting getting paid by playing association football. Labruna wanted to choose basketball as he was unsure if association football was going to give him a living, however there wasn't an available position so he instead signed up to play exclusively in the special fourth division of the club's association football team, this time switching to an inside-left position. In the special fourth division, his team managed won two championships between 1936 and 1938. River Plate's first-team would give Labruna to debut unofficially in an exhibition game against Jorge Newbery (Rufino) on 25 May 1937, where he played in his inside-left position, winning the game 8–3. Later on, Labruna would start playing the second division, and would play four more exhibition games in 1938 in a friendly tournament called the Campeonato Nocturno Rioplatense. Here he would play his first Superclásico derby against Boca Juniors on 12 February. Labruna would dispute another exhibition game against Talleres de Córdoba on 12 October 1938 to celebrate Talleres' 25th anniversary, River Plate would end up winning 2–0 with him scoring his goal with the first-team in the 80th minute of the game.

== Club career ==
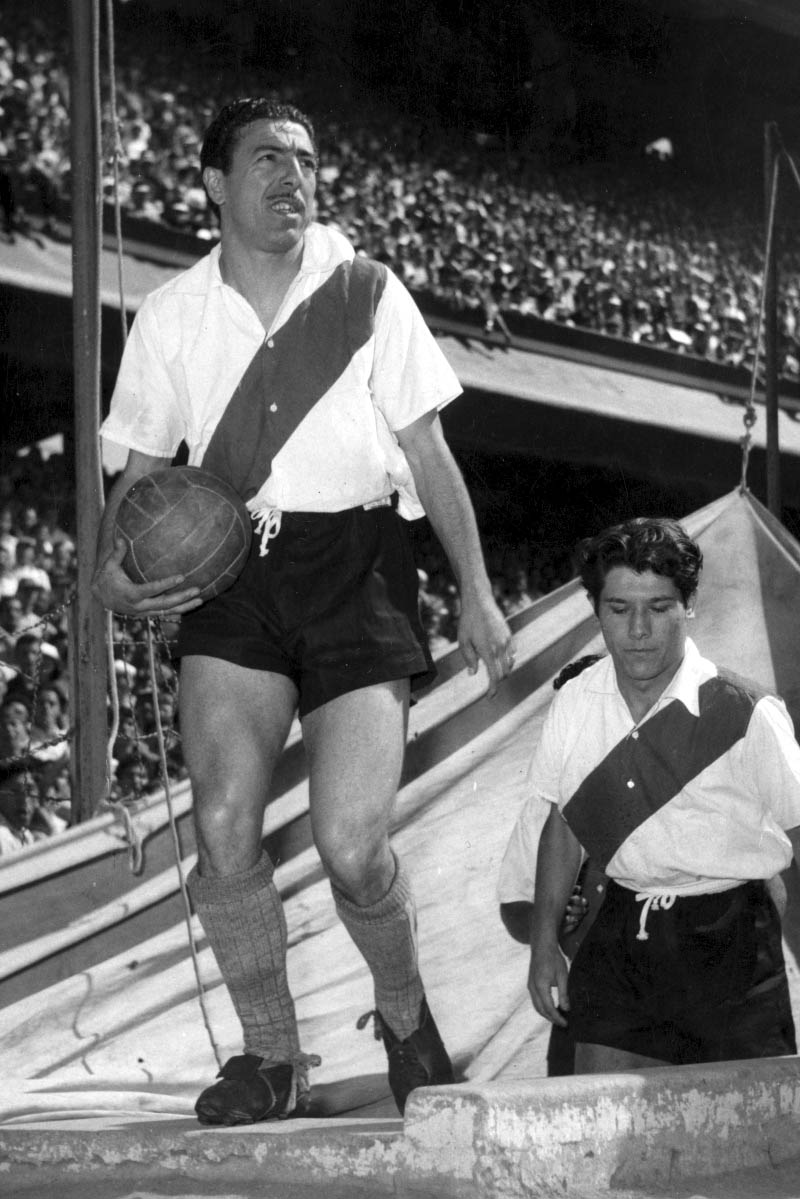
Labruna entering to La Bombonera with Sívori in 1955. He is the all-time top scorer of the Superclásico.

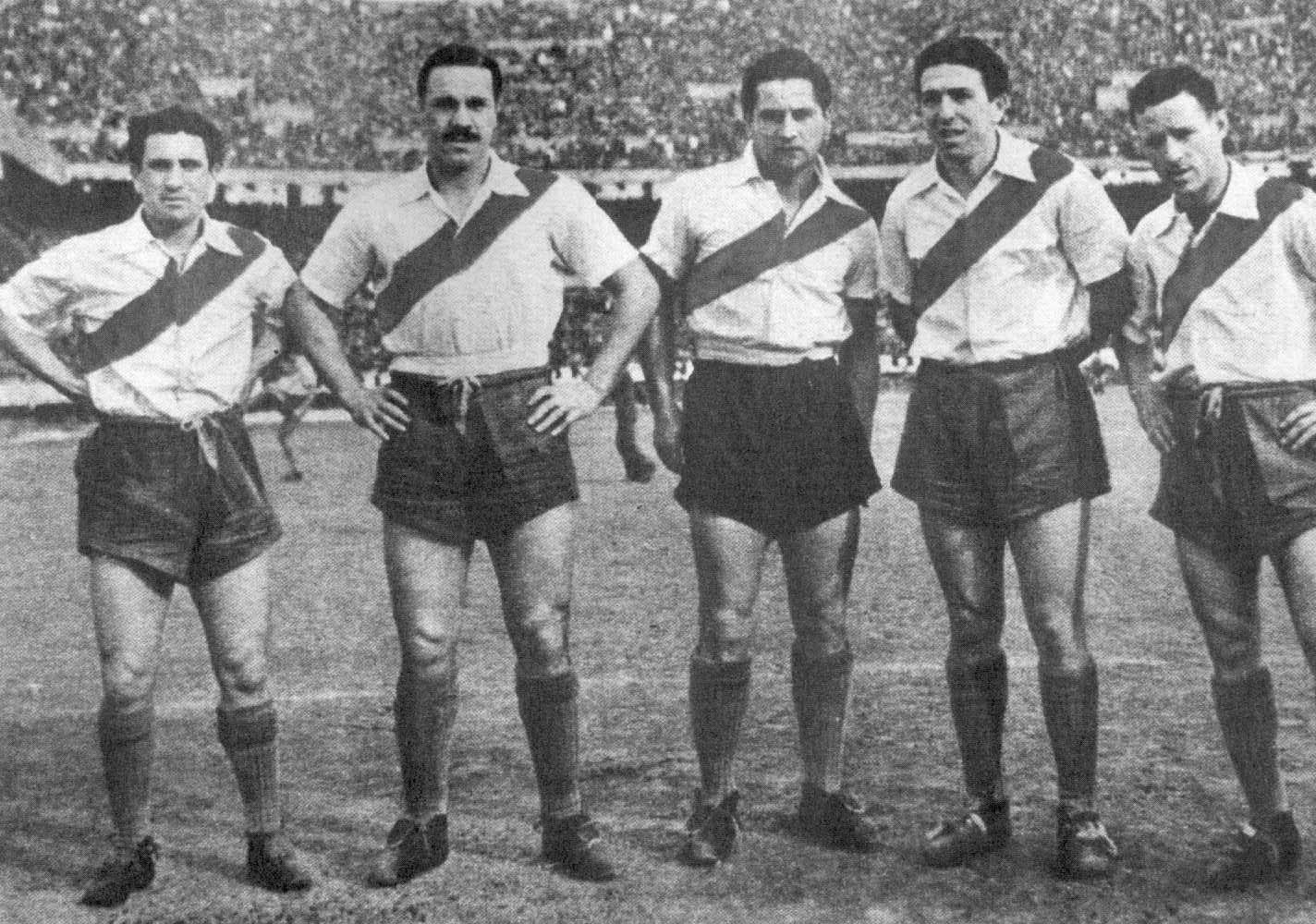
La Máquina of 1941: Muñoz, Moreno, Pedernera, Labruna and Loustau

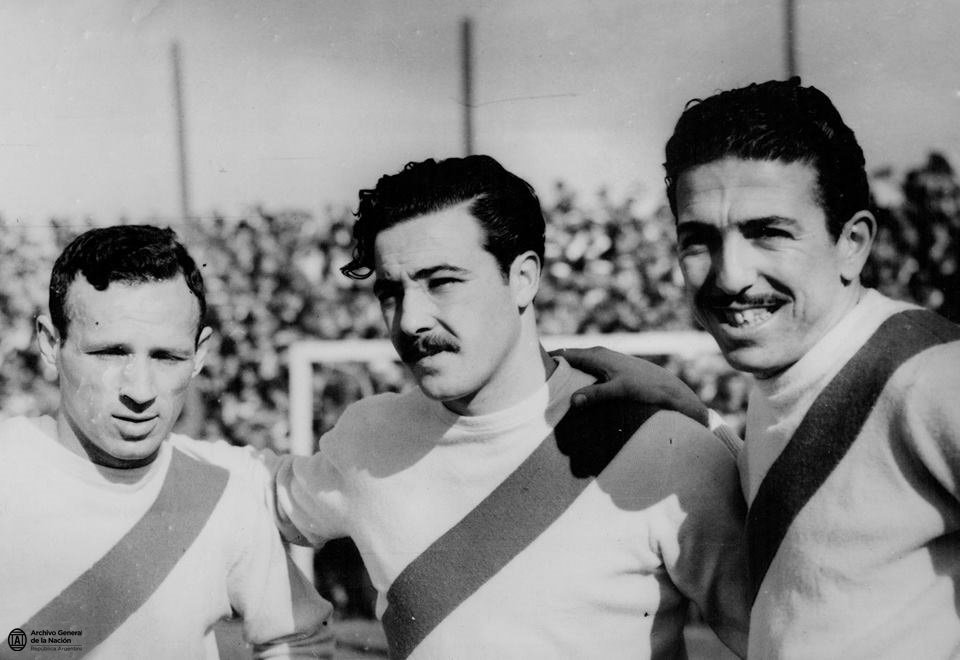
Félix Loustau, Walter Gómez and Ángel Labruna, the strikers of River Plate in 1952

Labruna made his debut in the Primera División as a replacement for José Manuel Moreno, who had been suspended by the club, wearing the number 10 shirt. The match was disputed on 18 June 1939 in La Plata against Estudiantes, which defeated River by 1–0.

His goals and outstanding performances caused Moreno to play on the right side of the field when he was allowed to play again. Labruna played in River for 20 years, winning 9 domestic championships with the team (1941, 1942, 1945, 1947, 1952, 1953, 1955, 1956, 1957) and being the top scorer twice (1943 with 23 goals and 1945 with 25).

He was part of his club's legendary team along with Juan Carlos Muñoz, José Manuel Moreno, Adolfo Pedernera, and Félix Loustau, where he played as an inside-left forward. Although this attacking line only disputed 18 games with those players, they were regarded as one of the best forward line in the history of Argentine football. They were nicknamed La Máquina (The Machine) due to their skills with the ball and synchronized play. Coach and former player Carlos Peucelle said that his team was formed by "A goalkeeper and 10 forwards", using an imaginary "1–10".

Labruna holds a number of records for River Plate, including his record of 16 goals in the superclásico derby with fierce rival Boca Juniors.

In 1959, Labruna left River Plate having defended the club's colors in 515 matches and scoring 317 goals, including 293 in the Argentine first division, making him the competition's all-time highest goalscorer along with Arsenio Erico, a record that remains nowadays. At the age of 41 years and 14 days, Labruna became the oldest-ever outfield player in the history of the Primera División, another record that he still holds. He later played two seasons in the Chilean C.S.D. Rangers, and the Uruguayan team Rampla Juniors of Montevideo, before returning to Argentina to finish his career at Platense, when he was 43 years old.

== International career ==
Labruna played 37 matches for the Argentina national team, scoring 17 goals. He also won two South American Championships (1946 and 1955) and as a nearly 40-year-old he played in the final phase of 1958 FIFA World Cup held in Sweden.

As other great players of his generation, Labruna could not participate in other World Cups due to the event's suspension during World War II and later for the decision taken by the Argentine Football Association, which did not compete in the World Cups of Brazil and Switzerland.

== Coaching career ==
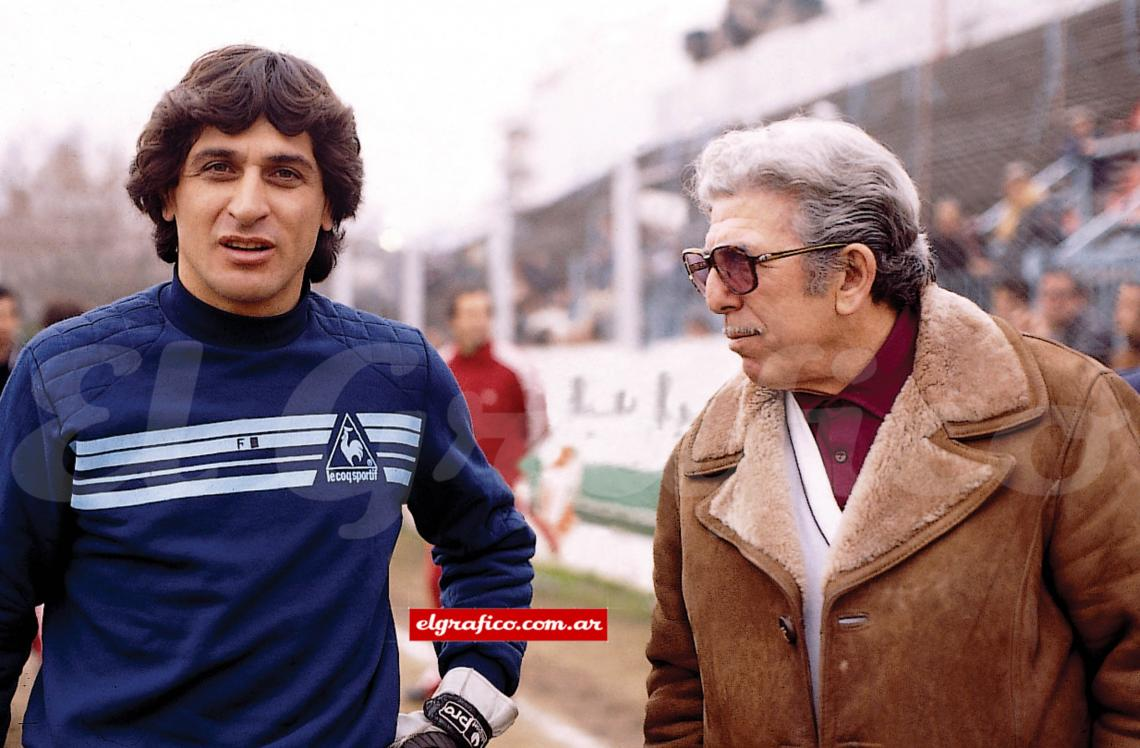
Labruna in 1983, during his time as manager of Argentinos Juniors, with Ubaldo Fillol, goalkeeper of that team

After ending his career as a player he became Assistant Coach and Coach in River Plate, Defensores de Belgrano, Platense, Rosario Central (where he won his first Nacional championship, in 1971), Talleres de Córdoba, Racing Club, Lanús, Chacarita and Argentinos Juniors.

In 1975 River called Labruna to offer him work as coach. Labruna won two championships that same year, breaking a "curse" of 18 years without titles. Labruna's period in charge of River Plate brought the club much domestic success, a side endowed with players such as Daniel Passarella, Norberto Alonso and Leopoldo Luque. Notable fashion designer Ante Garmaz had designed his tie for that tournament, causing controversy for Garmaz because of him being an avid fan of Boca Juniors.

== Personal life ==
Labruna had two sons, Daniel (died in 1969) and Omar, who worked with Ramón Díaz in River Plate and then coached Olimpo de Bahía Blanca and other teams.

Labruna died on 19 September 1983, from a heart attack, at 64 years old. He is buried at La Chacarita Cemetery in Buenos Aires. Every 28 September, River Plate's fans celebrate the "International River Plate Fan's Day" as a tribute to one of the club's greatest idols.

In 2021, a 6.7-metre bronze statue of Labruna was unveiled outside River Plate’s Monumental stadium.

== Career statistics ==
| Team | Years | Matches | Goals | Average |
|---|---|---|---|---|
| River Plate | 1939–1959 | 541 | 318 | 0.59 |
| Rampla Juniors | 1960 | 16 | 4 | 0.19 |
| C.S.D. Rangers | 1960 | 4 | 1 | 0.00 |
| Platense | 1961 | 2 | 0 | 0.00 |
| Argentina national team | 1942–1958 | 37 | 17 | 0.46 |
| Total Career | 1939–1961 | 573 | 341 | 0.59 |

== Honours ==
=== Player ===
River Plate

- Argentine Primera División: 1941, 1942, 1945, 1947, 1952, 1953, 1955, 1956, 1957
- Copa Ibarguren: 1941, 1942, 1952
- Copa Adrián C. Escobar: 1941
- Copa Aldao: 1941, 1945, 1947

Argentina

- Copa América: 1946, 1955

=== Manager ===
Rosario Central

- Argentine Primera División: Nacional 1971

River Plate

- Primera División: Metropolitano 1975, Nacional 1975, Metropolitano 1977, Nacional 1979, Metropolitano 1979, Metropolitano 1980
- Copa Libertadores runner-up: 1976

=== Individual ===
- Copa Aldao top scorer: 1941, 1945, 1947 (joint)
- Argentine Primera División top scorer: 1943 (joint), 1945
- IFFHS Argentina All Times Dream Team (Team C): 2021
