= 1970 Argentine Primera División =

79th season of top-tier football league in Argentina

Primera División
- Season: 1970
- Dates: 20 March – 27 December
- Champions: Boca Juniors (Metropolitano); Independiente (Nacional)
- 1971 Copa Libertadores: Boca Juniors; Rosario Central

The 1970 Primera División season was the 79th season of top-flight football in Argentina, with Independiente winning the Metropolitano championship (9th title) by goals for difference (43–42) after being equaled on points with River Plate. In the Nacional championship, Boca Juniors (coached by José María Silvero after Alfredo Di Stéfano resigned) won its 18th league title after beating Rosario Central in the final.

Starting this season, two substitutions were allowed per team during the game. That rule had been first introduced in 1959, but for injured goalkeepers only.

Unlike previous seasons, there was no team promoted from Primera B Metropolitana. Boca Juniors and Rosario Central (as champion and runner up of Nacional respectively) qualified to 1971 Copa Libertadores. On the other hand, Lanús, Quilmes and Unión (SF) were relegated.

== Campeonato Metropolitano ==
=== Standings ===
Metropolitano
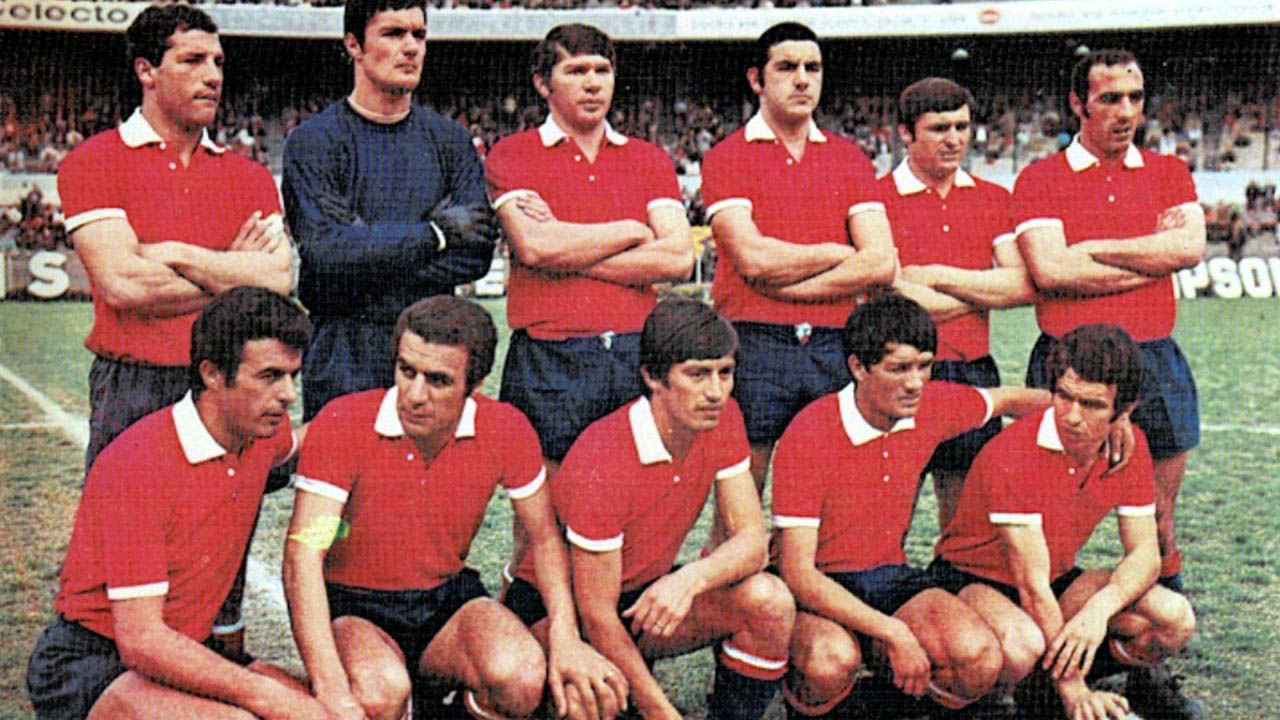
- Independiente, Metropolitano champion
- Season: 1970
- Dates: 20 March –19 December
- Champions: Independiente (9th title)
- Promoted: (none)
- Relegated: Lanús; Quilmes; Unión (SF)
- Top goalscorer: (Argentina) Oscar Más (16)

Pos	Team	Pld	W	D	L	GF	GA	GD	Pts	Qualification
1	Independiente	20	12	3	5	43	25	+18	27	Champion
2	River Plate	20	10	7	3	42	24	+18	27	to Campeonato; Nacional
3	San Lorenzo	20	7	11	2	36	20	+16	25	to Campeonato; Nacional
4	Boca Juniors	20	10	5	5	30	19	+11	25	to Campeonato; Nacional
5	Newell's Old Boys	20	8	9	3	28	26	+2	25	to Campeonato; Nacional
6	Platense	20	9	6	5	24	19	+5	24	to Campeonato; Nacional
7	Atlanta	20	8	6	6	29	26	+3	22	to Campeonato; Nacional
8	Banfield	20	6	10	4	17	14	+3	22	to Campeonato; Nacional
9	Gimnasia y Esgrima (LP)	20	8	5	7	28	26	+2	21	to Campeonato; Nacional
10	Vélez Sársfield	20	8	5	7	27	26	+1	21	to Campeonato; Nacional
11	Racing	20	5	11	4	26	22	+4	21	to Campeonato; Nacional
12	Rosario Central	20	7	7	6	26	23	+3	21	to Campeonato; Nacional
13	Chacarita Juniors	20	8	4	8	22	23	−1	20	to Petit; Tournament
14	Huracán	20	6	7	7	33	32	+1	19	to Petit; Tournament
15	Quilmes	20	6	5	9	24	32	−8	17	to Petit; Tournament
16	Estudiantes (LP)	20	4	9	7	22	26	−4	17	to Petit; Tournament
17	Argentinos Juniors	20	5	7	8	21	33	−12	17	to Reclasificatorio
18	Unión	20	6	4	10	24	35	−11	16	to Reclasificatorio
19	Lanús	20	4	5	11	22	35	−13	13	to Reclasificatorio
20	Colón	20	3	5	12	21	40	−19	11	to Reclasificatorio
21	Los Andes	20	2	5	13	22	41	−19	9	to Reclasificatorio

=== Petit Tournament ===
Pos	Team	Pld	W	D	L	GF	GA	GD	Pts	Qualification
1	Estudiantes (LP)	3	1	2	0	4	3	+1	4	to Nacional
2	Chacarita Juniors	3	1	2	0	3	2	+1	4	to Nacional
3	Quilmes	3	1	2	0	2	1	+1	4	to Reclasificatorio
4	Huracán	3	0	0	3	2	5	−3	0	to Reclasificatorio

=== Reclasificatorio Tournament ===
Pos	Team	Pld	W	D	L	GF	GA	GD	Pts	Qualification or relegation
1	Los Andes	12	8	1	3	23	14	+9	17	Remained in Primera División
2	Huracán	12	6	4	2	33	11	+22	16	Remained in Primera División
3	Argentinos Juniors	12	5	3	4	17	14	+3	13	Remained in Primera División
4	Colón	12	4	3	5	15	24	−9	11	to Reclasificatorio de Primera
5	Quilmes	12	5	1	6	14	18	−4	11	to Reclasificatorio de Primera
6	Unión	12	3	4	5	11	17	−6	10	Relegated
7	Lanús	12	1	4	7	13	28	−15	6	Relegated

=== Reclasificatorio de Primera Tournament ===
This tournament was contested by two teams from Primera B Metropolitana (Ferro Carril Oeste and Almirante Brown) and teams placed 4th and 5th in Reclasificatorio Tournament, in order to define the rest two promoted or relegated clubs. After finishing 1st, Ferro Carril Oeste promoted to Primera División.

Pos	Team	Pld	W	D	L	GF	GA	GD	Pts	Qualification
1	Ferro Carril Oeste	3	3	0	0	10	1	+9	6	Promoted to Primera
2	Colón	3	1	1	1	6	6	0	3	Remained in Primera
3	Quilmes	3	1	1	1	3	6	−3	3	Relegated
4	Almirante Brown	3	0	0	3	4	10	−6	0	Remained in Primera B

=== Top scorers ===
Rank.	Player	Team	Goals
1	(Argentina) Oscar Más	River Plate	16
2	(Argentina) Alfredo Obberti	Newell's Old Boys	15
3	(Argentina) Aníbal Tarabini	Independiente	14
4	(Argentina) Rodolfo Fischer	San Lorenzo	13
5	(Argentina) Delio Onnis	Gimnasia y Esgrima LP	12
5	(Argentina) Héctor Yazalde	Independiente	12

== Campeonato Nacional ==
Nacional
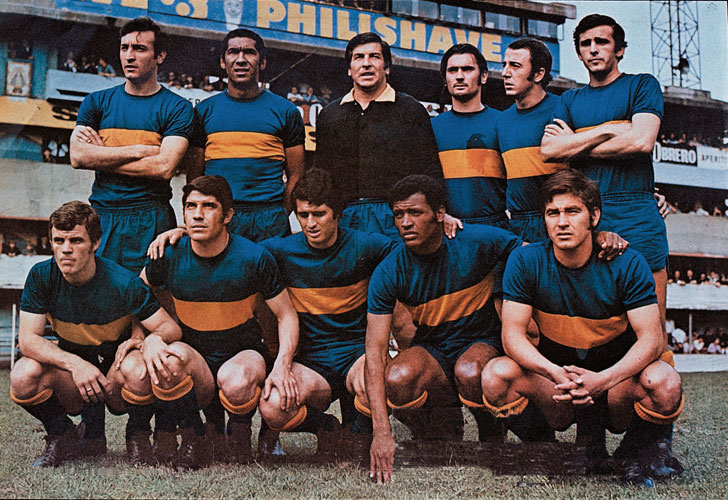
- Boca Juniors, Nacional champion
- Season: 1970
- Dates: 4 September – 27 December
- Champions: Boca Juniors (18th title)
- 1971 Copa Libertadores: Boca Juniors; Rosario Central
- Top goalscorer: (Argentina) Carlos Bianchi (18 goals)

=== Group A ===
Pos	Team	Pld	W	D	L	GF	GA	GD	Pts	Qualification
1	Chacarita Juniors	20	13	3	4	25	19	+6	29	Semifinals
2	Gimnasia y Esgrima (LP)	20	12	3	5	46	31	+15	27	Semifinals
3	River Plate	20	11	4	5	30	20	+10	26	
4	San Lorenzo	20	11	2	7	45	26	+19	24	
5	Gimnasia y Esgrima (M)	20	10	3	7	33	32	+1	23	
6	Racing	20	5	7	8	35	30	+5	17	
7	Newell's Old Boys	20	5	5	10	29	36	−7	15	
7	Talleres (C)	20	4	7	9	27	42	−15	15	
9	San Martín (T)	20	5	4	11	19	37	−18	14	
10	Platense	20	3	4	13	21	46	−25	10	

=== Group B ===
Pos	Team	Pld	W	D	L	GF	GA	GD	Pts	Qualification
1	Rosario Central	20	13	3	4	42	26	+16	29	Semifinals
1	Boca Juniors	20	13	3	4	36	20	+16	29	Semifinals
3	Vélez Sársfield	20	9	7	4	39	24	+15	25	
4	Independiente	20	9	3	8	37	35	+2	21	
5	Estudiantes (LP)	20	7	6	7	31	22	+9	20	
6	Banfield	20	6	6	8	29	29	0	18	
7	Atlanta	20	5	6	9	17	22	−5	16	
8	Kimberley	20	4	7	9	33	41	−8	15	
9	Gimnasia y Esgrima (J)	20	4	6	10	27	43	−16	14	
10	San Martín (SJ)	20	4	5	11	27	47	−20	13	

=== Semifinals ===
Played under a single-match format in neutral venue:

* Winner of the series

Date	Team 1	Team 2	Res.	Venue	City
19 Dec	Rosario Central	Gimnasia y Esgrima LP	3–0	Newell's Old Boys Stadium	Rosario
20 Dec	Boca Juniors	Chacarita Juniors	2–0	Racing Stadium	Avellaneda

=== Final ===
Date	Team 1	Team 2	Res.	Venue	City
23 Dec	Boca Juniors	Rosario Central	2–1	River Plate Stadium	Buenos Aires

=== Top scorers ===
Rank.	Player	Team	Goals
1	(Argentina) Carlos Bianchi	Vélez Sarsfield	18
2	(Argentina) Delio Onnis	Gimnasia y Esgrima LP	16
3	(Argentina) Juan José Valiente	Kimberley (Mdp)	14
4	(Argentina) Roberto Gramajo	Rosario Central	13 12
4	(Argentina) Alfredo Obberti	Newell's Old Boys	13 12
