= 1973 Argentine Primera División =

82nd season of top-tier football league in Argentina

Primera División
- Season: 1973
- Champions: Huracán (Metropolitano); Rosario Central (Nacional)

The 1973 Primera División season was the 82nd season of top-flight football in Argentina. Huracán won the Metropolitano (5th title) while Rosario Central won the Nacional (2nd title).

There were no relegations.

== Metropolitano Championship ==
Metropolitano
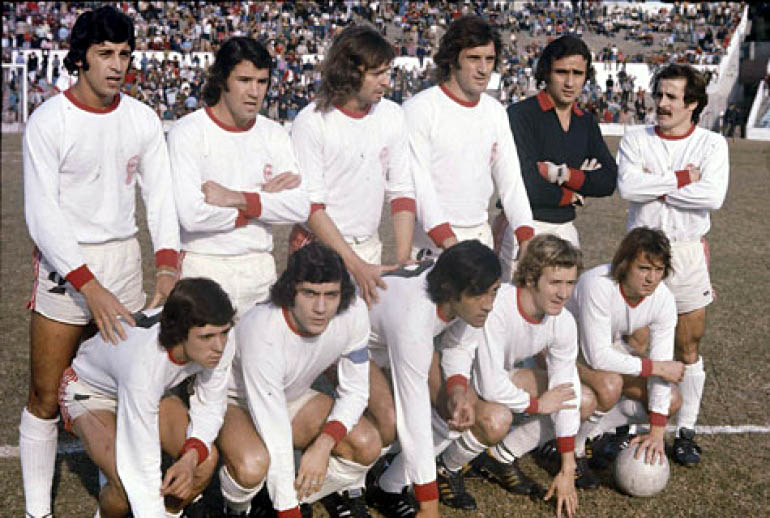
- Huracán, Metropolitano champions
- Season: 1973
- Champions: Huracán (5th title)
- Promoted: All Boys
- Relegated: (none)
- 1974 Copa Libertadores: Huracán
- Top goalscorer: (Argentina) Hugo Curioni (Argentina) Oscar Más (Argentina) Ignacio Pena (17 goals each)

Pos	Team	Pld	W	D	L	GF	GA	GD	Pts
1	Huracán	32	19	8	5	62	30	+32	46
2	Boca Juniors	32	18	6	8	69	37	+32	42
3	San Lorenzo	32	15	10	7	52	37	+15	40
4	Independiente	32	15	8	9	44	32	+12	38
5	River Plate	32	15	7	10	59	56	+3	37
6	Vélez Sársfield	32	13	8	11	49	46	+3	34
7	Estudiantes (LP)	32	12	9	11	51	47	+4	33
8	Rosario Central	32	12	9	11	44	46	−2	33
9	Atlanta	32	12	8	12	33	39	−6	32
10	Argentinos Juniors	32	12	7	13	41	50	−9	31
11	Gimnasia y Esgrima (LP)	32	9	12	11	54	55	−1	30
12	Racing	32	8	14	10	44	47	−3	30
13	Chacarita Juniors	32	8	11	13	34	46	−12	27
14	Newell's Old Boys	32	10	6	16	45	54	−9	26
15	Colón	32	5	14	13	32	45	−13	24
16	All Boys	32	8	5	19	34	60	−26	21
17	Ferro Carril Oeste	32	7	6	19	36	56	−20	20

== Nacional Championship ==
Nacional
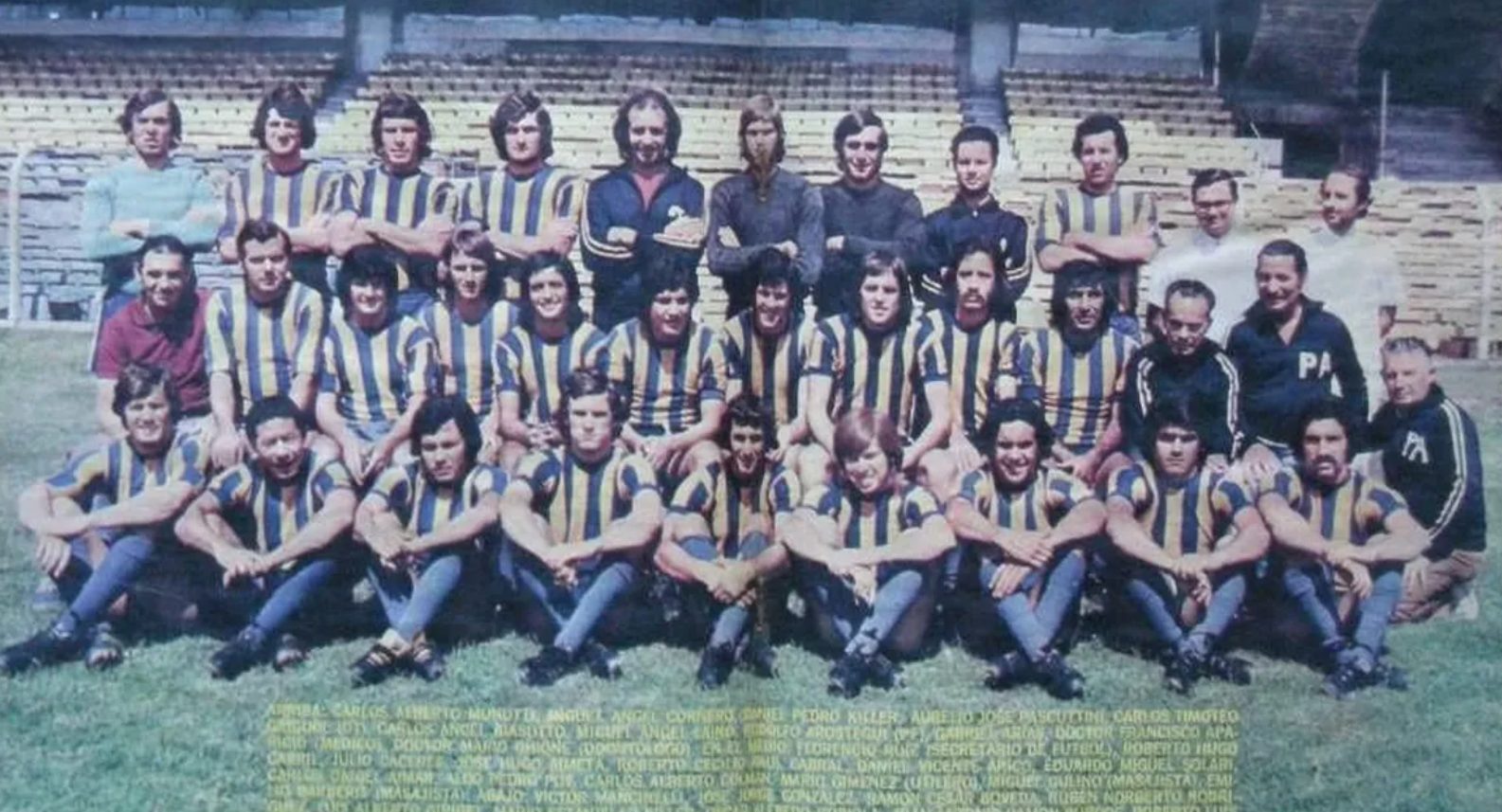
- Rosario Central, Nacional champions
- Season: 1973
- Champions: Rosario Central (2nd title)
- 1974 Copa Libertadores: Rosario Central
- Top goalscorer: (Argentina) Juan Gómez Voglino (18 goals)

=== Group A ===
Pos	Team	Pld	W	D	L	GF	GA	GD	Pts
1	San Lorenzo	15	8	6	1	31	16	+15	22
2	River Plate	15	10	2	3	29	17	+12	22
3	Vélez Sarsfield	15	8	6	1	24	13	+11	22
4	Estudiantes (LP)	15	7	3	5	27	15	+12	17
5	Newell's Old Boys	15	7	3	5	28	23	+5	17
6	San Lorenzo (MdP)	15	6	4	5	20	20	0	16
7	Chacarita Juniors	15	5	5	5	25	25	0	15
8	Instituto	15	6	2	7	23	20	+3	14
9	Racing	15	5	3	7	27	30	−3	13
10	Colón	15	6	1	8	22	25	−3	13
11	San Martín (M)	15	5	3	7	19	28	−9	13
12	Cipolletti	15	3	5	7	22	29	−7	11
13	San Martín (T)	15	4	2	9	19	29	−10	10
14	All Boys	15	3	3	9	19	32	−13	9
15	Juventud Antoniana	15	2	3	10	13	35	−22	7

=== Group B ===
Pos	Team	Pld	W	D	L	GF	GA	GD	Pts
1	Atlanta	15	10	2	3	35	19	+16	22
2	Rosario Central	15	9	4	2	25	11	+14	22
3	Huracán	15	8	5	2	29	15	+14	21
4	Belgrano	15	8	4	3	25	18	+7	20
5	Boca Juniors	15	9	0	6	30	19	+11	18
6	Argentinos Juniors	15	8	2	5	28	17	+11	18
7	Gimnasia y Esgrima (LP)	15	7	2	6	32	27	+5	16
8	Independiente	15	6	4	5	23	21	+2	16
9	Atlético Tucumán	15	5	6	4	25	24	+1	16
10	Independiente Rivadavia	15	5	3	7	21	27	−6	13
11	Desamparados	15	3	6	6	19	22	−3	12
12	Chaco For Ever	15	4	3	8	19	25	−6	11
13	Ferro Carril Oeste	15	3	3	9	10	24	−14	9
14	Gimnasia y Esgrima (J)	15	3	3	9	18	37	−19	9
15	Kimberley	15	1	4	10	14	36	−22	6

=== Final Tournament ===
Pos	Team	Pld	W	D	L	GF	GA	GD	Pts
1	Rosario Central	3	2	1	0	6	3	+3	5
2	River Plate	3	1	1	1	6	7	−1	3
3	Atlanta	3	0	2	1	3	4	−1	2
4	San Lorenzo	3	0	2	1	3	4	−1	2
