= 1974 Argentine Primera División =

83rd season of top-tier football league in Argentina

Primera División
- Season: 1974
- Champions: Newell's Old Boys (Metropolitano); San Lorenzo (Nacional)

The 1974 Primera División season was the 83rd season of top-flight football in Argentina. Newell's Old Boys won the Metropolitano (1st title) and San Lorenzo (9th title) won the Nacional championship.

For the second consecutive season, no teams were relegated.

== Metropolitano Championship ==
Metropolitano
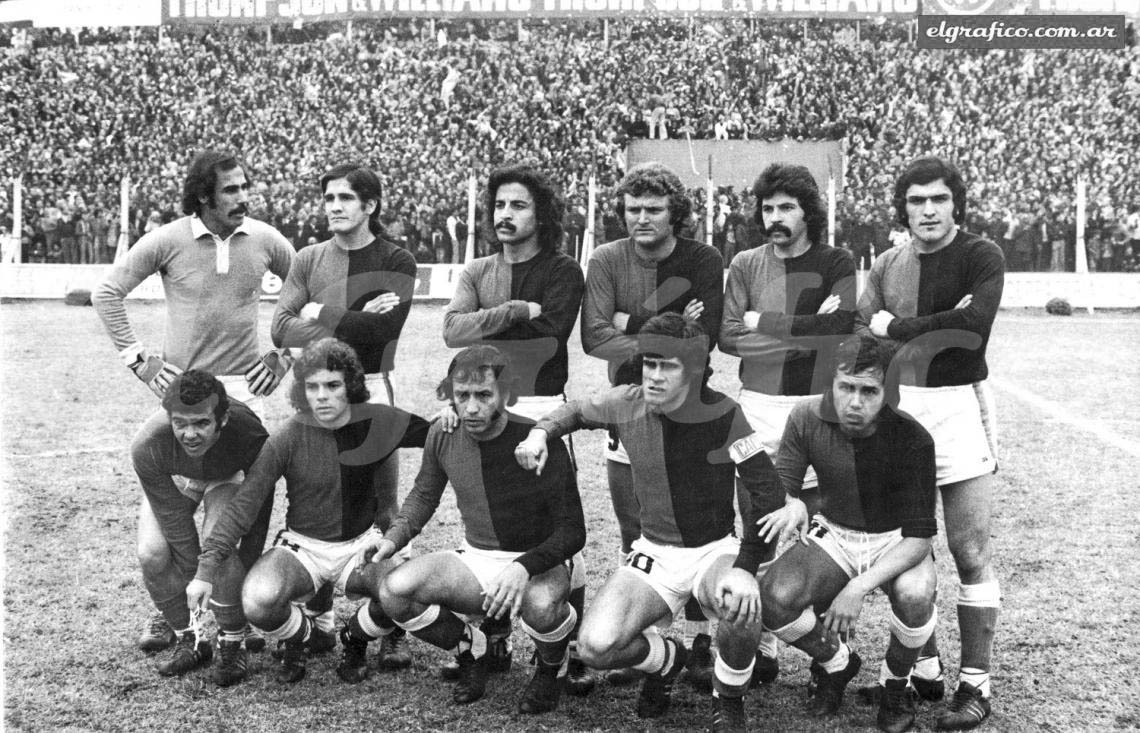
- Newell's O.B., Metropolitano champions
- Season: 1974
- Champions: Newell's Old Boys (1st title)
- Promoted: Banfield
- Relegated: (none)
- 1975 Copa Libertadores: Newell's Old Boys
- Top goalscorer: (Argentina) Carlos Morete (18 goals)
- Biggest home win: Boca Juniors 7-1 Argentinos Juniors
- Biggest away win: San Lorenzo 0-6 Boca Juniors
- Highest scoring: Huracán 6-2 Atlanta; Boca Juniors 7-1 Argentinos; Independiente 6-2 Chacarita

=== Group A ===
Pos	Team	Pld	W	D	L	GF	GA	GD	Pts
1	Rosario Central	18	12	2	4	39	23	+16	26
2	Huracán	18	8	5	5	32	29	+3	21
3	River Plate	18	9	2	7	37	28	+9	20
3	Racing	18	9	2	7	28	30	−2	20
5	All Boys	18	6	6	6	22	24	−2	18
6	Gimnasia y Esgrima (LP)	18	6	5	7	30	29	+1	17
6	Atlanta	18	5	7	6	29	33	−4	17
8	Vélez Sársfield	18	4	4	10	20	32	−12	12
9	Banfield	18	3	5	10	22	31	−9	11

=== Group B ===
Pos	Team	Pld	W	D	L	GF	GA	GD	Pts
1	Newell's Old Boys	18	10	4	4	32	27	+5	24
2	Boca Juniors	18	10	3	5	37	21	+16	23
2	Ferro Carril Oeste	18	8	7	3	28	20	+8	23
4	Colón	18	8	5	5	30	30	0	21
5	Independiente	18	7	6	5	38	23	+15	20
6	San Lorenzo	18	4	6	8	23	30	−7	14
6	Argentinos Juniors	18	5	4	9	33	42	−9	14
8	Estudiantes (LP)	18	5	3	10	21	28	−7	13
9	Chacarita Juniors	18	2	6	10	21	42	−21	10

2nd place playoff

- Boca Juniors 2–0 Ferro Carril Oeste

=== Final Tournament ===
Pos	Team	Pld	W	D	L	GF	GA	GD	Pts
1	Newell's Old Boys	3	2	1	0	6	4	+2	5
2	Rosario Central	3	1	1	1	5	4	+1	3
3	Boca Juniors	3	1	0	2	4	5	−1	2
3	Huracán	3	1	0	2	4	6	−2	2

== Nacional Championship ==
Nacional
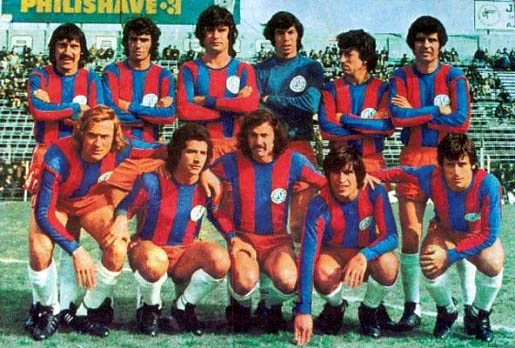
- San Lorenzo, Nacional champions
- Season: 1974
- Champions: San Lorenzo (11th title)
- 1975 Copa Libertadores: Rosario Central
- Top goalscorer: (Argentina) Mario Kempes (25 goals)
- Biggest home win: Banfield 13-1 Puerto Comercial
- Biggest away win: Atlanta 0-7 Huracán
- Highest scoring: Banfield 13-1 Puerto Comercial

=== Group A ===
Pos	Team	Pld	W	D	L	GF	GA	GD	Pts
1	Boca Juniors	18	15	2	1	46	10	+36	32
2	Rosario Central	18	13	4	1	36	8	+28	30
3	Banfield	18	9	4	5	42	25	+17	22
4	Estudiantes (LP)	18	8	4	6	25	20	+5	20
5	Belgrano	18	8	3	7	30	21	+9	19
6	Desamparados	18	5	5	8	32	35	−3	15
7	Central Norte	18	5	4	9	22	31	−9	14
8	All Boys	18	2	5	11	20	36	−16	9
9	Puerto Comercial	18	2	0	16	14	75	−61	4

==== Results ====
Home \ Away	ALL	BAN	BEL	BOC	CNS	DES	EST	PCO	RCE
All Boys	—	3–1	0–2	1–1	1–3	2–2	1–2	4–1	0–1
Banfield	4–2	—	1–0	1–4	2–0	7–0	1–0	13–1	1–1
Belgrano	6–1	4–1	—	1–2	2–1	1–1	2–0	3–0	1–3
Boca Juniors	2–1	4–0	1–0	—	3–0	7–0	1–0	9–0	2–1
Central Norte	1–0	2–2	1–2	0–3	—	1–0	1–1	3–1	1–2
Desamparados	0–0	1–2	3–1	0–1	4–0	—	2–2	7–2	0–1
Estudiantes (LP)	2–0	1–1	2–1	0–0	4–2	1–0	—	3–0	1–1
Puerto Comercial	4–3	0–4	0–3	2–3	0–4	1–4	1–2	—	0–2
Rosario Central	4–0	1–0	3–0	2–0	2–0	2–1	3–1	7–0	—

Source: es:Campeonato Nacional 1974 (Argentina) (in Spanish)
Legend: Blue = home team win; Yellow = draw; Red = away team win.

=== Group B ===
Pos	Team	Pld	W	D	L	GF	GA	GD	Pts
1	Talleres (C)	18	10	5	3	25	12	+13	25
2	Newell's Old Boys	18	7	8	3	27	20	+7	22
3	Gimnasia y Esgrima (LP)	18	9	3	6	29	22	+7	21
3	Altos Hornos Zapla	18	7	7	4	30	27	+3	21
5	River Plate	18	7	5	6	33	20	+13	19
6	Argentinos Juniors	18	6	6	6	29	31	−2	18
7	Colón	18	4	6	8	20	22	−2	14
8	Jorge Newbery	18	2	9	7	9	18	−9	13
9	Huracán (SR)	18	1	4	13	12	48	−36	6

==== Results ====
Home \ Away	AHZ	ARJ	COL	GLP	HSR	JNJ	NEW	RIV	TAL
Altos Hornos Zapla	—	2–2	3–1	2–0	2–0	1–1	2–1	1–1	1–0
Argentinos Juniors	4–2	—	2–2	4–2	3–1	2–0	2–1	2–4	0–0
Colón	3–1	3–1	—	0–1	1–0	0–0	2–2	0–1	3–0
Gimnasia y Esgrima (LP)	1–3	4–0	2–1	—	4–0	1–1	1–1	3–1	1–0
Huracán (SR)	0–1	0–1	2–2	1–4	—	1–1	0–1	0–0	0–2
Jorge Newbery	1–1	1–1	0–0	1–2	0–2	—	0–0	1–0	0–1
Newell's Old Boys	4–4	3–2	2–1	3–1	3–0	0–0	—	1–0	1–1
River Plate	4–1	3–2	2–0	0–0	10–1	3–1	1–2	—	1–1
Talleres (C)	2–1	2–0	1–0	1–0	6–0	2–0	3–2	2–1	—

Source: es:Campeonato Nacional 1974 (Argentina) (in Spanish)
Legend: Blue = home team win; Yellow = draw; Red = away team win.

=== Group C ===
Pos	Team	Pld	W	D	L	GF	GA	GD	Pts
1	San Lorenzo	18	11	5	2	43	14	+29	27
2	Ferro Carril Oeste	18	12	2	4	28	16	+12	26
3	Racing	18	9	4	5	35	23	+12	22
3	San Martín (T)	18	8	6	4	24	18	+6	22
5	Chacarita Juniors	18	8	2	8	31	29	+2	18
6	Aldosivi	18	6	4	8	24	30	−6	16
7	Atlético Regina	18	3	6	9	13	30	−17	12
8	Deportivo Mandiyú	18	3	4	11	20	37	−17	10
9	Godoy Cruz	18	3	2	13	15	35	−20	8

==== Results ====
Home \ Away	ALD	ATR	CHA	DPM	FCO	GOD	SLO	SMT	RAC
Aldosivi	—	2–0	2–2	2–0	0–2	3–1	0–3	1–1	3–1
Atlético Regina	1–2	—	0–0	2–1	1–1	0–1	0–1	0–5	1–1
Chacarita Juniors	4–1	0–1	—	6–1	2–1	2–0	1–3	1–0	1–2
Deportivo Mandiyú	1–1	2–0	1–2	—	1–2	5–2	2–2	1–2	1–1
Ferro Carril Oeste	2–1	2–0	6–1	3–0	—	2–0	1–0	0–1	2–1
Godoy Cruz	2–1	2–2	0–1	1–0	0–1	—	0–2	0–2	1–2
San Lorenzo	3–0	4–0	4–1	4–0	1–1	3–1	—	6–1	3–0
San Martín (T)	1–0	1–1	1–0	3–1	0–1	1–1	1–1	—	2–1
Racing	3–1	4–0	4–3	2–0	6–0	3–0	1–1	2–1	—

Source: es:Campeonato Nacional 1974 (Argentina) (in Spanish)
Legend: Blue = home team win; Yellow = draw; Red = away team win.

=== Group D ===
Pos	Team	Pld	W	D	L	GF	GA	GD	Pts
1	Vélez Sársfield	18	11	4	3	34	12	+22	26
2	Independiente	18	10	5	3	49	19	+30	25
3	San Martín (M)	18	10	4	4	27	18	+9	24
4	Huracán	18	9	5	4	38	24	+14	23
5	Atlético Tucumán	18	5	6	7	29	26	+3	16
6	Huracán (CR)	18	4	7	7	20	40	−20	15
7	Chaco For Ever	18	3	8	7	19	30	−11	14
8	San Lorenzo (MdP)	18	3	5	10	21	40	−19	11
9	Atlanta	18	3	3	12	12	41	−29	9

==== Results ====
Home \ Away	ATL	CFE	HCR	HUR	IND	SLM	SMM	TUC	VEL
Atlanta	—	3–1	1–1	0–7	0–1	2–0	1–1	1–3	0–3
Chaco for Ever	0–0	—	2–2	2–2	1–1	3–0	2–0	0–0	0–0
Huracán (CR)	1–0	1–1	—	4–0	1–5	2–2	1–0	2–0	0–0
Huracán	2–0	2–1	5–0	—	3–3	3–0	0–0	2–1	3–1
Independiente	4–0	3–0	5–1	3–2	—	7–0	5–1	4–0	1–2
San Lorenzo (MdP)	3–1	1–2	3–0	0–1	1–1	—	2–2	2–1	0–4
San Martín (M)	1–0	2–0	4–0	3–0	2–0	3–1	—	2–1	1–0
Atlético Tucumán	7–1	4–1	3–3	1–1	2–2	2–1	2–0	—	1–2
Vélez Sársfield	2–0	6–1	5–0	3–1	2–1	2–2	0–0	1–0	—

Source: es:Campeonato Nacional 1974 (Argentina) (in Spanish)
Legend: Blue = home team win; Yellow = draw; Red = away team win.

=== Final Tournament ===
Pos	Team	Pld	W	D	L	GF	GA	GD	Pts
1	San Lorenzo	7	5	1	1	11	8	+3	11
2	Rosario Central	7	4	2	1	16	13	+3	10
3	Vélez Sársfield	7	4	0	3	15	9	+6	8
4	Talleres (C)	7	3	1	3	10	10	0	7
5	Independiente	7	3	0	4	9	9	0	6
5	Ferro Carril Oeste	7	2	2	3	11	14	−3	6
7	Boca Juniors	7	2	0	5	10	11	−1	4
7	Newell's Old Boys	7	1	2	4	7	15	−8	4

==== Results ====
Home \ Away	BOC	FCO	IND	NEW	RCE	SLO	TAL	VEL
Boca Juniors	—	4–1	—	1–0	—	—	—	0–1
Ferro Carril Oeste	—	—	2–0	—	—	2–3	—	1–3
Independiente	2–1	—	—	—	2–3	2–0	3–1	—
Newell's Old Boys	—	1–1	1–0	—	2–2	—	—	—
Rosario Central	4–3	2–3	—	—	—	1–1	1–0	—
San Lorenzo	1–0	—	—	2–1	—	—	2–1	2–1
Talleres (C)	2–1	1–1	—	3–1	—	—	—	2–1
Vélez Sársfield	—	—	1–0	6–1	2–3	—	—	—

Source: promiedos.com.ar (in Spanish)
Legend: Blue = home team win; Yellow = draw; Red = away team win.
