= 1953 Argentine Primera División =

62nd season of top-tier football league in Argentina

Primera División
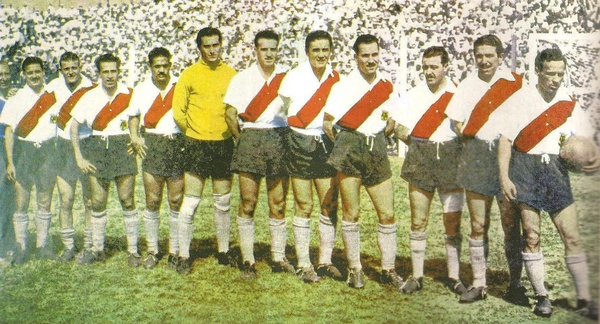
- River Plate, champions
- Season: 1953
- Champions: River Plate (11th title)
- Promoted: Gimnasia y Esgrima (LP)
- Relegated: Estudiantes (LP)
- Top goalscorer: (Argentina) Juan Armando Benavídez (Argentina) Juan José Pizzuti (22 goals each)

The 1953 Argentine Primera División was the 62nd season of top-flight football in Argentina. The season began on April 5 and ended on November 22.

Gimnasia y Esgrima (LP) returned to Primera while the other team of the city, Estudiantes (LP), was relegated. River Plate won its 11th league title.

== League standings ==
Pos	Team	Pld	W	D	L	GF	GA	GD	Pts
1	River Plate	30	18	7	5	60	36	+24	43
2	Vélez Sársfield	30	13	13	4	53	35	+18	39
2	Racing	30	16	7	7	53	40	+13	39
4	Independiente	30	14	7	9	52	47	+5	35
5	San Lorenzo	30	15	4	11	55	36	+19	34
6	Gimnasia y Esgrima (LP)	30	13	6	11	55	43	+12	32
7	Boca Juniors	30	11	6	13	41	37	+4	28
7	Chacarita Juniors	30	9	10	11	35	38	−3	28
7	Rosario Central	30	10	8	12	43	51	−8	28
10	Lanús	30	11	5	14	44	45	−1	27
10	Platense	30	8	11	11	48	61	−13	27
12	Huracán	30	9	8	13	43	52	−9	26
13	Banfield	30	8	9	13	40	48	−8	25
13	Ferro Carril Oeste	30	9	7	14	40	56	−16	25
15	Newell's Old Boys	30	8	6	16	34	50	−16	22
15	Estudiantes (LP)	30	9	4	17	35	56	−21	22
