= Juan Armando Benavídez =

Spanish footballer (1927–2021)

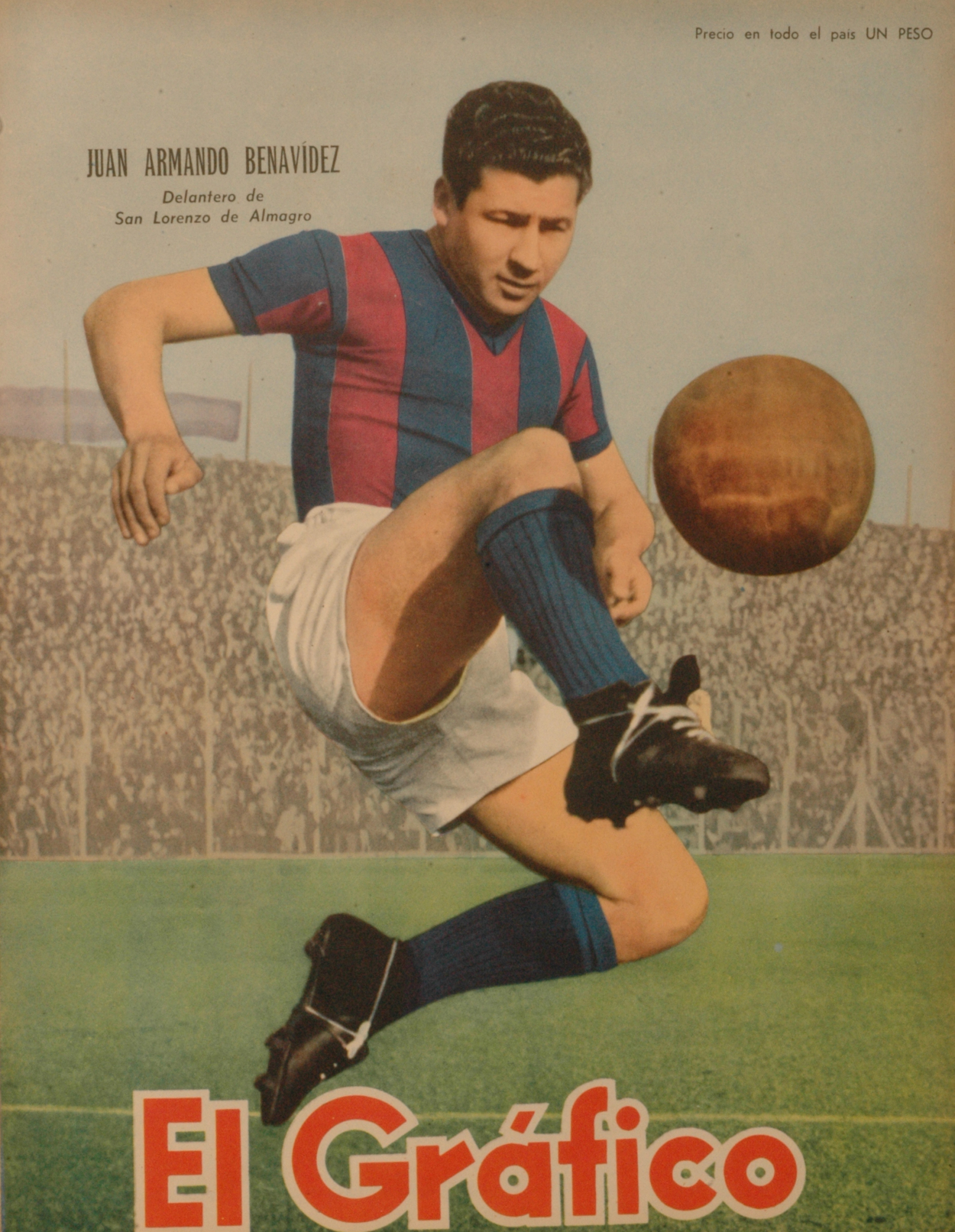

Personal information
- Full name: Juan Armando Benavídez Rodríguez
- Date of birth: 20 September 1927
- Place of birth: San Miguel de Tucumán, Argentina
- Date of death: 31 July 2005 (aged 77)
- Place of death: Málaga, Spain
- Positions: Midfielder; forward

Youth career
- Atlético Tucumán

Senior career*
Years	Team	Apps	(Gls)
1946	Estudiantes de La Plata	2	(0)
1947–1950	Newell's Old Boys	105	(34)
1951–1955	San Lorenzo	131	(68)
1955–1958	Espanyol	62	(20)
1958–1960	Granada	27	(8)
1960–1962	Málaga	29	(7)
Total		356	(137)

International career
1951	Argentina	1	(0)
- * Club domestic league appearances and goals

Juan Armando Benavídez Rodríguez (20 September 1927 – 31 July 2005) was an Argentine football player.

== Career ==
Born in San Miguel de Tucumán, Benavídez played as a striker. He began his career in his hometown club, Atlético Tucumán, and played briefly for Estudiantes de La Plata in 1946 before transferring to Newell's Old Boys in 1947. In 1951, he was signed by San Lorenzo, where scored 68 goals in 131 matches, and was the top goalscorer of the 1953 Argentine Primera División.

He remained at San Lorenzo until 1955, when he was briefly signed to Atlético de Madrid. He was presented as the "next Di Stéfano" and debuted in a friendly against Botafogo, but performed poorly and was sacked at half-time. Benavídez then returned the transfer money and went back to Buenos Aires, but soon after, he was signed by RCD Espanyol, where he remained until 1958, scoring 20 goals in 62 matches. After leaving Espanyol, he played for Granada and Málaga before retiring in 1962.

He played one match for the Argentina national team in 1951, against Ireland.

He died on 31 July 2005 in Málaga, aged 77.
