= 1945 Argentine Primera División =

54th season of top-tier football league in Argentina

Primera División
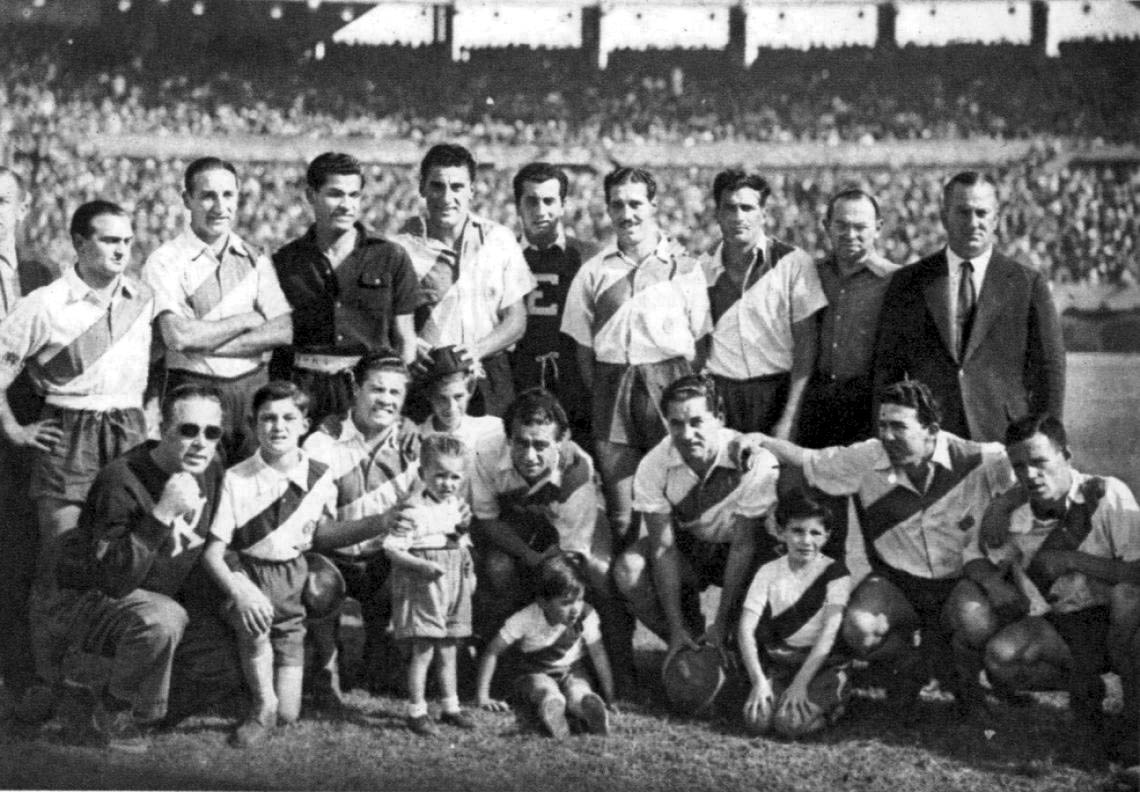
- River Plate, champions
- Season: 1945
- Champions: River Plate (8th title)
- Promoted: Gimnasia y Esgrima (LP)
- Relegated: Gimnasia y Esgrima (LP)
- 1945 Copa Aldao: River Plate
- Top goalscorer: (Argentina) Angel Labruna (25 goals)

The 1945 Argentine Primera División was the 54th season of top-flight football in Argentina. The season began on April 22 and ended on December 2.

Gimnasia y Esgrima (LP) returned to Primera but the squad would be relegated again at the end of the season, after finishing last. River Plate won its 8th title.

== League standings ==
Pos	Team	Pld	W	D	L	GF	GA	GD	Pts
1	River Plate	30	20	6	4	66	34	+32	46
2	Boca Juniors	30	18	6	6	71	43	+28	42
3	Independiente	30	17	7	6	68	51	+17	41
4	San Lorenzo	30	15	8	7	67	45	+22	38
5	Huracán	30	17	2	11	76	61	+15	36
6	Estudiantes (LP)	30	14	4	12	63	58	+5	32
7	Platense	30	12	6	12	50	57	−7	30
8	Newell's Old Boys	30	12	4	14	52	56	−4	28
9	Vélez Sársfield	30	11	4	15	69	73	−4	26
10	Racing	30	10	5	15	59	63	−4	25
11	Atlanta	30	6	12	12	56	64	−8	24
11	Rosario Central	30	10	4	16	58	70	−12	24
13	Lanús	30	8	7	15	46	59	−13	23
13	Ferro Carril Oeste	30	9	5	16	51	73	−22	23
15	Chacarita Juniors	30	6	10	14	46	65	−19	22
16	Gimnasia y Esgrima (LP)	30	7	6	17	50	76	−26	20
