= Alfredo Obberti =

Argentine footballer (1945–2021)

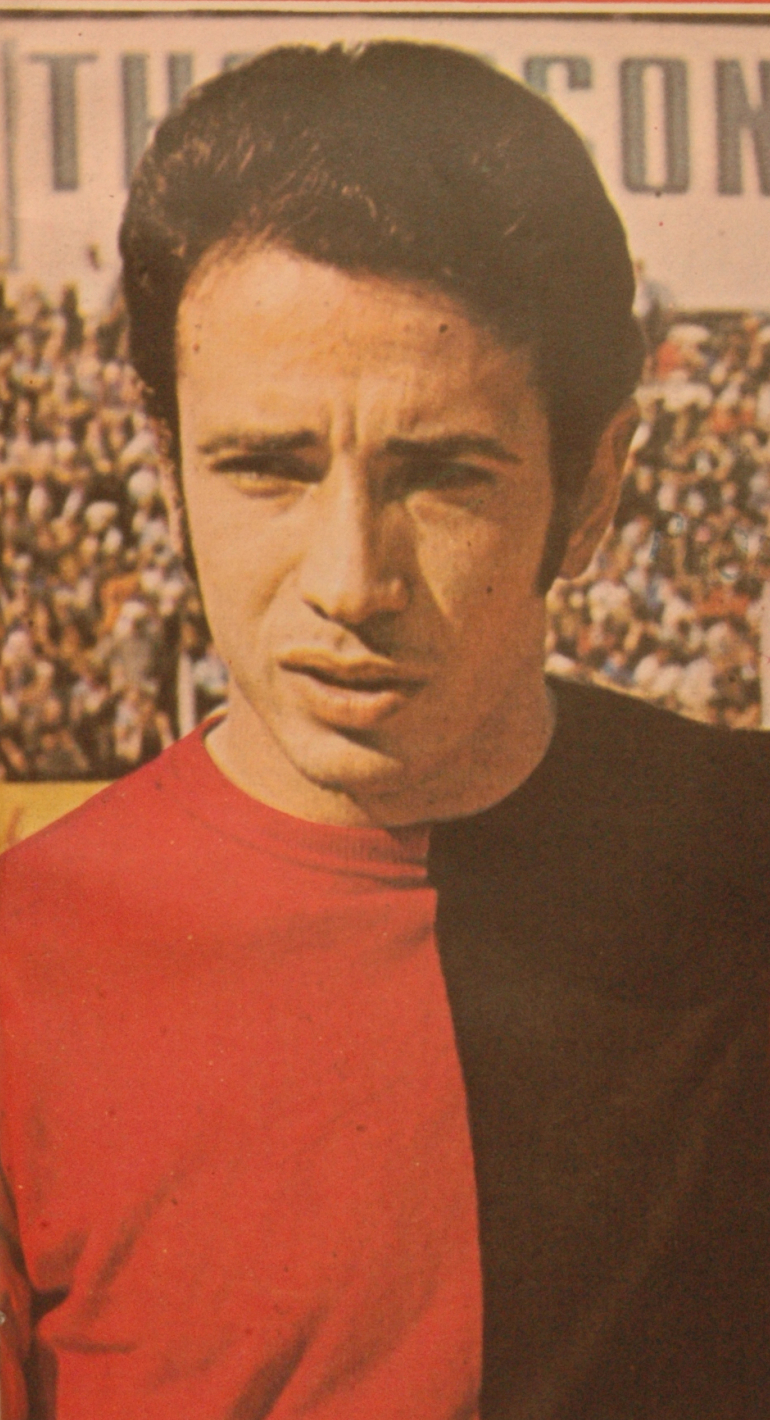
- Obberti in 1970

Personal information
- Full name: Alfredo Domingo Obberti
- Date of birth: 12 August 1945
- Place of birth: Buenos Aires, Argentina
- Date of death: 5 July 2021 (aged 75)
- Height: 1.85 m (6 ft 1 in)
- Position: Striker

Senior career*
Years	Team	Apps	(Gls)
1962–1969	Huracán	74	(26)
1965	→ Colón de Santa Fe (loan)		
1968	→ Los Andes (loan)	37	(23)
1970–1972	Newell's Old Boys	147 (total)	(89)
1972–1973	Grêmio	37	(11)
1974–1975	Newell's Old Boys	(see above)	

International career
- Argentina
- * Club domestic league appearances and goals

Alfredo Domingo Obberti (12 August 1945 – 5 July 2021) was an Argentine footballer who played as a striker for a number of clubs in Argentina and Grêmio in Brazil.

Obberti made his professional debut in 1962 playing for Huracán, he spent a season with Colón de Santa Fe in 1965 before returning to Huracán in 1966.

In 1968 Obberti joined Los Andes where he became Argentina's leading goalscorer in the Metropolitano 1968 with 13 goals. In 1969, he returned to Huracán.

In 1970 Obberti joined Newell's Old Boys where he again became topscorer in Argentina with 10 goals. In 1972, he joined Grêmio returning to Newell's in 1974. In his time with Newell's he scored 89 goals in 147 matches to make him the club's third highest goalscorer of all time.

Obberti was Grêmio's highest foreign goalscorer with 35 goals in 105 matches, until Hernán Barcos, also from Argentina, surpassed him in August 2014.

== Honours ==
Newell's Old Boys

- Primera División Argentina: Metropolitano 1974
