= Club Atlético Puerto Comercial =

Argentine football club

Puerto Comercial
- Full name: Club Atlético Puerto Comercial
- Nickname(s): Comercialinos, Verdes, Gringos.
- Founded: August 1, 1915
- Ground: Estadio Club Puerto Comercial
- Chairman: Victor Palacio
- Manager: Marcelo Cela
- League: Torneo Argentino C
Home colours	Away colours	Third colours

Club Atlético Puerto Comercial is an Argentine football club based in the city of Bahía Blanca, in the Buenos Aires Province.

== Honors ==
- Liga del Sur: 1920, 1924, 1926, 1927, 1928, 1931, 1935, 1936, 1937, 1941, 1943, 1958, 1973, 1989.
- Participation in the Torneo Nacional: 1974
