= List of Boca Juniors chairmen =

The following is a list of chairmen of Boca Juniors, one of the premier football teams in Argentina.

Román Riquelme is the current chairman, in charge since December 2023.

List of Boca Juniors chairmen
No.	Image	Name	Tenure	Notes
1		Esteban Baglietto	1905	Founding member and player. First president of whom there are records
2		Luis Cerezo	1905–1906	Then player for the club (1908–11, 1915)
3		Juan Brichetto	1906–1907	He took office on February 20, 1906. During his presidency the club adopted the blue and gold colors
4		Ludovico Dollenz	1907–1908	Owner of a printing in La Boca
5		Pablo Giúdice	1908	Boca affiliated to AFA
6		Martín F. García	1908–1914	Four-time reelected (starting in 1910)
7		Santiago Sana	1914–1915	Founding member, also player. Club moved to Wilde
8		Emilio Meincke	1915–1917	Club returned to La Boca (new venue). Reelected twice.
9		Santiago Sana	1918	
10		Emilio Meincke	1918–1920	First official titles in 1919
11		Emilio Gagliolo	1920–1921	Resigned in Nov 1921
12		Agustín Cassinelli	1921	Interim
13		Juan Fernández	1921–1922	Called to elections in 1922
14		Manlio Anastasi	1922–1926	Estadio Brandsen y Del Crucero inaugurated (1924)
15		Bartolomé Gutiérrez	1927–1928	
16		Nicolás Blahovich	1928	
17		Ruperto Molfino	1929–1936	
18		Camilo Cichero	1937–1938	Construction of a new stadium started
19		Eduardo Sánchez Terrero	1939–1946	La Bombonera inaugurated
20		José Alfredo López	1947	Former footballer (1918–22) and bocce player for the club
21		Daniel Gil	1948–1953	Stadium's lightning system inaugurated
22		Alberto J. Armando	1954–1955	Creation of a museum
23		Emilio Leveratto	1956	
24		Miguel de Riglos	1957–1959	
25		Alberto J. Armando	1960–1980	First Libertadores and Intercontinental cups won
26		Martín Noel	1981–1983	Closure of La Bombonera, first shirt sponsor
27		Domingo Corigliano	1984	Players strike, resigned
28		Horacio Blanco	1984	He takes over after the resignation of Corigliano and Orgambide. On November 9, he signed an act requesting the intervention of the club by the National Executive Power.
29		Federico Pollack	1984–1985	Federal Receiver to solve the crisis
30		Antonio Alegre	1985–1995	Carlos Heller as vice-president
31		Mauricio Macri	1995–2007	La Bombonera refurbished. Luis Conde Arena inaugurated
32		Pedro Pompilio	2007–2008	Died in office
33		Jorge Amor Ameal	2008–2011	In charge as Pompilio's vice-president
34		Daniel Angelici	2011–2019	
35		Jorge Amor Ameal	2019–2023	Román Riquelme and Mario Pergolini as vice-presidents
36		Román Riquelme	2023–Present	Record number of voters for an election
