= Antonio Alegre =

Argentine football official

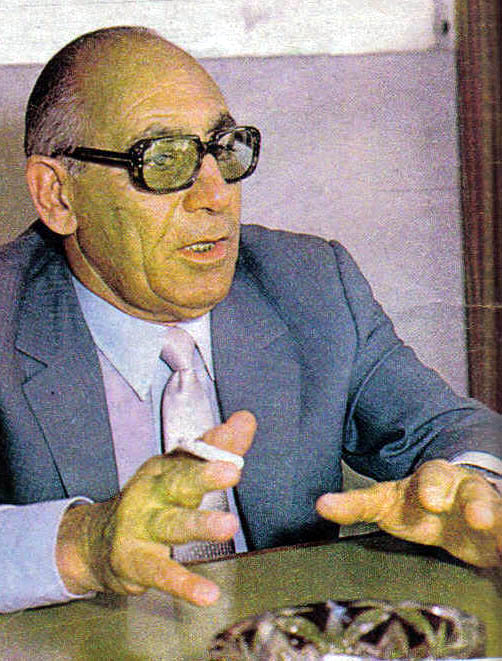
- Born: August 13, 1924; Chacabuco, Buenos Aires
- Died: February 24, 2010 (aged 85); Buenos Aires
- Years active: 1985–1995
- Known for: President of Boca Juniors

Antonio Alegre (August 13, 1924 – February 24, 2010) was a notable Argentine football official. He was president of Boca Juniors from 1985 to 1995, a period during which the club did not win any major trophy.

Alegre took Boca Juniors' presidency in 1985 after winning the election to former chairman Alberto J. Armando, and succeeding interventor Federico Pollack, who had been in charge due to the deep financial crisis of the club that included the closure of La Bombonera and a players strike. Carlos Heller was his vice president during his tenure as chairman of Boca Juniors.

== Biography ==
Born in Chacabuco, Buenos Aires to Lebanese Argentine immigrants, he was affiliated to Boca Juniors since his youth. He worked as a construction laborer, and eventually became a prosperous businessman as the proprietor of the Alegre Pavement Company. Fond of ping pong, his affable manner helped earn him the friendship of numerous important figures in Argentine politics, including UCR leader (and future President) Raúl Alfonsín, Peronist lawmaker Antonio Cafiero, and numerous members of the CGT trade union. Appointed director of the Buenos Aires Province bureau of the National Nutritional Plan by the newly elected President Alfonsín, Alegre was encouraged to run for the post of President of Boca Juniors by influential friends, and in 1984 became a candidate to succeed Federico Pollack, whom Alfonsín had appointed federal receiver.

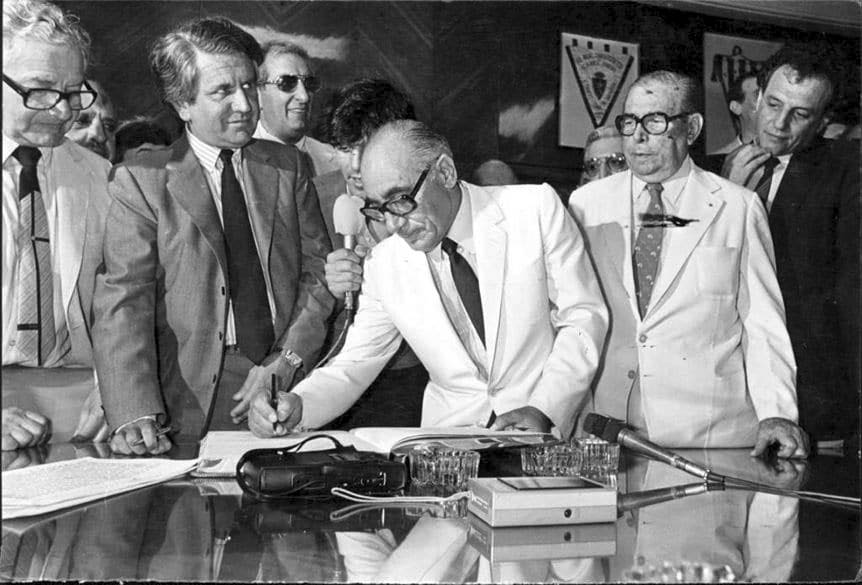
Alegre signing as new president of Boca Juniors in 1985. On the left, interventor Federico Pollack. At right, former president and candidate Alberto J. Armando

Elected, and inaugurated on January 6, 1985, he took office in a moment of crisis. Accompanied by his friend and running mate, Credico-op Bank director Carlos Heller, Alegre inherited a financially insolvent football club and a stadium unable to meet municipal safety requirements. The iconic La Bombonera stadium had been repeatedly closed for structural failures, and lawsuits against Boca Juniors were filed almost weekly.

Consequently, Boca, the winners of the Copa Intercontinental and the Copa Libertadores de América in 1977-78, had by 1984 been relegated to 16th place over the 19 Primera División teams at the time. Alegre settled 153 lawsuits early in his tenure by mortgaging his business assets for US$250,000, and by lending Boca Juniors US$800,000. These and other measures enabled him to recover the club's finances, however La Bombonera stadium did not show any sign of improvement. He also announced the sale of land acquired earlier by the team in the waterfront Puerto Madero district, a move opposed by Boca's former president, Alberto Armando. The land was promptly sold for US$21 million, however, and Armando's challenge to Alegre for the presidency of the team in 1986 was turned back.

The club did not enjoy any major sporting success: no Copa Libertadores or League title was won during the period, only minor tournaments, including the 1989 Supercopa Sudamericana, the 1990 Recopa Sudamericana, and Copa Master de Supercopa (1992), and the Copa de Oro Nicolás Leoz in 1993. The team invested increasingly large sums to acquire players who could strengthen the team, of whom few would remain, however; among his best investments was that of Carlos Fernando Navarro Montoya, who would play for Boca in 396 games, and was instrumental in number of the team's titles in that era. Alegre also stepped up efforts to acquire players from lower divisions, and among these a number became important contributors. These included Diego Latorre, Walter Pico, and Rodolfo Arruabarrena.

Alegre and Heller were defeated by Mauricio Macri on December 3, 1995, and the Alegre-Heller administration stepped down. After their departure, the club won various titles including several Copa Libetadores, Intercontinental trophies and League titles. The treasurer during their last term, Pedro Pompilio, was elected president of the team following Macri's election as Mayor of Buenos Aires in 2007, and both the late Pedro Pompilio and his successor, Jorge Amor Ameal, who was also part of the Alegre's management board, continued Alegre's policy of acquiring players from less prominent teams.
