= Angelici =

Angelici is a surname. Notable people with the surname include:

- Daniel Angelici (born 1964), Argentine lawyer and businessman
- Martha Angelici (1907–1973), French operatic soprano
