= Jorge Amor Ameal =

Argentine gastronomic entrepreneur, and former President of Boca Juniors

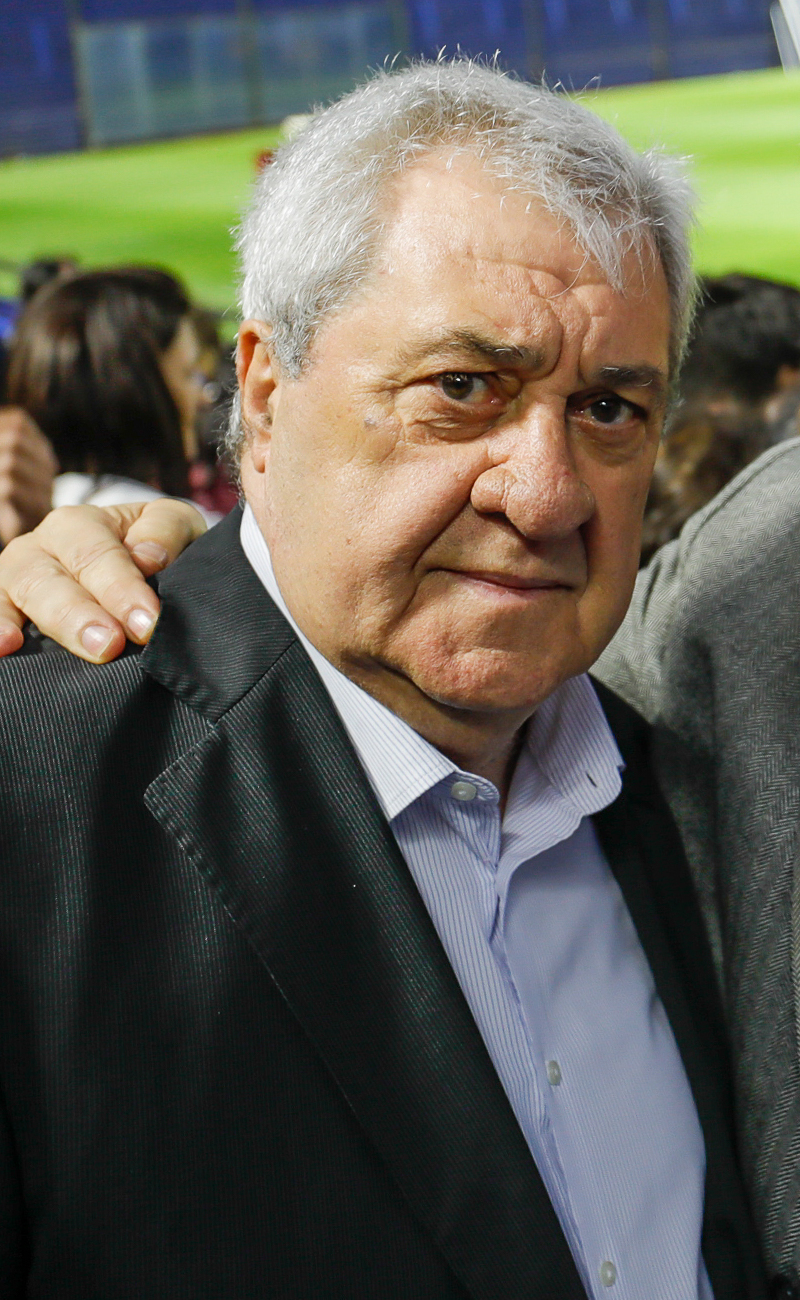
- Born: 1 January 1948 (age 77); Berazategui, Argentina
- Occupation: Football executive
- Years active: 2008–2011, 2019–present
- Known for: President of Boca Juniors (2008–2011, 2019–2023)

Jorge Amor Ameal (born Berazategui, Buenos Aires, 1948), is an Argentine gastronomic entrepreneur, and former President of Boca Juniors.

He became the club's first Vice-President, following the formula in the Presidential employer Pedro Pompilio, on June 1, 2008. But he had to take the post due to Pompilio's death on the October 30 of 2008.

== Biography ==
Ameal was born in Berazategui, Greater Buenos Aires, in 1948, and has been affiliated with Boca Juniors since 1979. He became a football executive through his mentor, Alfredo Martínez Sosa, a retired sailor who had been vice-president of the club.

Ameal's first role as Boca Juniors executive was in 1985, under the presidency of Antonio Alegre. He served as President of Membership and Vice-president of the Sports City. In 1995 he assumed as a member in the first presidency of Mauricio Macri. From there, he developed his institutional career, accompanying the management of what would later become the President of the Argentine Nation. He held successively the charges of President of the Department of Purchasing, Advertising and Concessions, First President of "Boca Crece" ("Boca Grows Up") and President of the Department of Interior and Exterior.

In 2008, he accompanied Pedro Pompilio in the club's presidential formula as 1st Vice President. After a series of inconveniences in the elections, where Justice had to intervene, he finally took office on June 1, 2008, accompanying the former Vice President of Mauricio Macri.

However, on October 30, 2008, Pedro Pompilio died unexpectedly as a result of myocardial infarction. Ameal had to assume the presidency on an interim basis, until November 5 when he formally assumed the position, as established by the inheritance statute. His first step as President of the club was to sign an agreement with the National University of Morón to begin the expansion works of La Bombonera, although this project would delay due to differences among the board of directors. However, this project will continue with the management of its predecessor. His first decision was the hiring of Carlos Bianchi as coach of the senior team and later on August 10, after a tie in the board of directors, by his tie-break vote the contract renewal of Juan Román Riquelme was decided. At that time, Daniel Angelici resigned from his position as treasurer of the club in disagreement with the decision taken.

During the Ameal's administration, the "adherent" category was incorporated into the statute. This allowed member to become "active" thus eliminating the affiliation with the only request of being a friend or relative of some committee member. Another new feature was the "transfer of subscriptions", where members could sell their seats to allow other supporters to attend the matches at La Bombonera.

The balance of the 2010–11 period led Boca Juniors to a general surplus of AR$ 50 million.
