= Mauricio Macri =

President of Argentina from 2015 to 2019

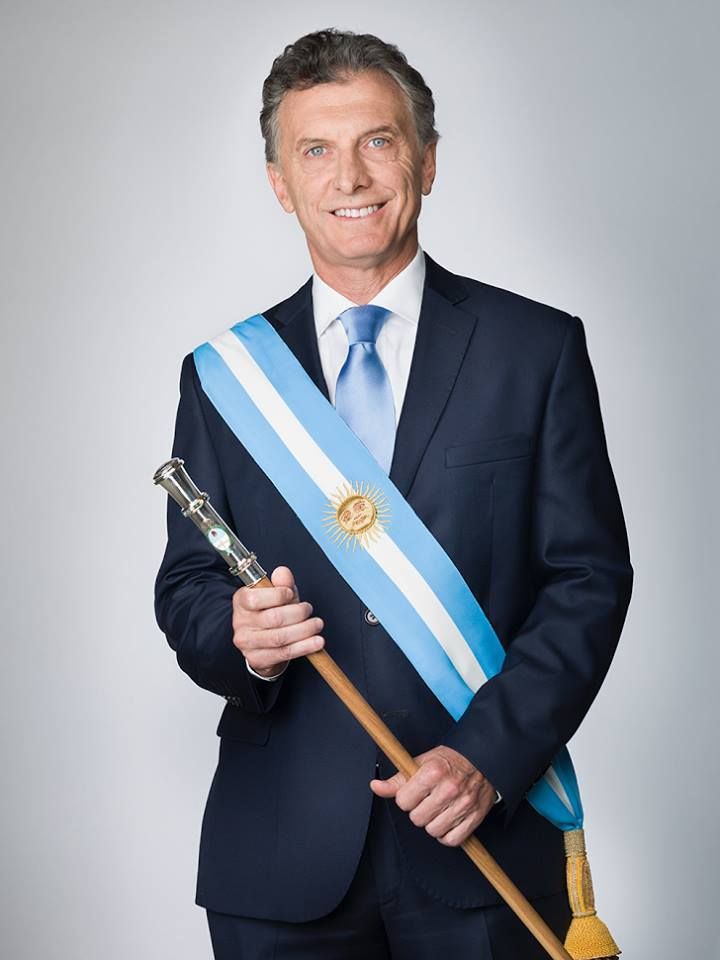
- Official portrait, 2015

56th President of Argentina
- In office 10 December 2015 – 10 December 2019
- Vice President: Gabriela Michetti
- Preceded by: Cristina Fernández de Kirchner
- Succeeded by: Alberto Fernández

President pro tempore of the Union of South American Nations
- In office 17 April 2017 – 17 April 2018
- Preceded by: Nicolás Maduro
- Succeeded by: Evo Morales

5th Chief of Government of Buenos Aires
- In office 10 December 2007 – 10 December 2015
- Deputy: Gabriela Michetti; María Eugenia Vidal
- Preceded by: Jorge Telerman
- Succeeded by: Horacio Rodríguez Larreta

National Deputy
- In office 10 December 2005 – 18 July 2007
- Succeeded by: Julián Obiglio
- Constituency: City of Buenos Aires

Personal details
- Born: 8 February 1959 (age 67) Tandil, Buenos Aires, Argentina
- Party: Republican Proposal (PRO) (since 2008)
- Other political affiliations: Commitment to Change (2003–2008); Juntos por el Cambio (2015–2023)
- Spouses: Ivonne Bordeu (m. 1981; div. 1991) Isabel Menditeguy (m. 1994; div. 2005) Juliana Awada (m. 2010; sep. 2025)
- Children: 4
- Parent: Franco Macri (father)
- Relatives: Alejandro Awada (brother-in-law)
- Education: Pontifical Catholic University of Argentina; Columbia University
- Profession: Civil engineer
- Website: Official website

Mauricio Macri (pronounced [mawˈɾisjo ˈmakɾi]; born 8 February 1959) is an Argentine businessman and politician who served as President of Argentina from 2015 to 2019. He has been the leader of the Republican Proposal (PRO) party since its founding in 2005. He previously served as Chief of Government of Buenos Aires from 2007 to 2015, and was a member of the Chamber of Deputies representing Buenos Aires from 2005 to 2007. Ideologically, he identifies himself as a liberal conservative on the Argentine centre-right.

Born in Tandil, Macri trained as a civil engineer at the Pontifical Catholic University of Argentina and attended Columbia University for business school. After embarking on a business career, he was kidnapped in 1991. The experience prompted him to enter politics, after being released by his captors. He served as president of football club Boca Juniors from 1994 to 2007, reestablishing its profitability which raised his public profile. In 2003 he launched the Commitment for Change, eventually developing it into the modern PRO party. Following an unsuccessful bid for Chief of Government of Buenos Aires in 2003, Macri was elected in 2007 and won re-election in 2011. Four years later he was elected president of Argentina in the 2015 general election – the first presidential runoff ballotage in Argentine history.

The presidency of Macri focused on reforming the national economy and improving diplomatic relations. He moved from a fixed exchange-rate system to a floating one, and removed taxes on exports and reduced subsidies on energy to reduce the fiscal deficit. He aligned the country with gradualist neoliberalism and re-opened Argentina to international markets by lifting currency controls (which he reinstated shortly before his term ended), restructuring sovereign debt, and pressing free-market solutions. Domestically, he pursued moderate socially liberal policies, and liberalized the energy sector.

Macri strongly opposed the government of Nicolás Maduro in Venezuela for human rights abuses and called for a restoration of democracy in the country. He recognized Juan Guaidó, who was elected President of Venezuela by the National Assembly during the Venezuelan presidential crisis of 2019. Macri improved Argentinian relations with the United States and from Mercosur achieved a free trade agreement with the European Union and closer ties with the Pacific Alliance. During the first week in office, Macri annulled the Memorandum of understanding between Argentina and Iran, which would have established a joint investigation into the 1994 bombing with AMIA, a terrorist attack on a Jewish organization for which Argentina blamed Hezbollah and Iran.

His legislative pursuits varied in efficacy and received mixed reception from Argentines and globally. His presidency has been praised for leaving a legacy of anti-corruption and increasing Argentina's sovereign marketability, but has been criticized for failing to materially reform the economy, falling short of containing inflation, and building up external debt. Real wages declined during his term in office and a large number of small and medium-sized companies went out of business. In the 2019 general election, he became the first incumbent president in Argentina to lose reelection to a second term and was defeated by Alberto Fernández.

== Early life, education and early career ==
Macri was born in Tandil in the province of Buenos Aires, the son of Italian-born tycoon Francesco "Franco" Macri (owner of the Philco affiliate in Argentina) and Alicia Blanco-Villegas Cinque. The family moved to Buenos Aires a short time later, and kept their houses in Tandil as vacation properties. His father, and his uncle Jorge Blanco Villegas, influenced Macri to become a businessman, and Franco expected his son to succeed him as leader of his firms. Macri preferred his uncle's company to constant scrutiny by his father. He was educated at Colegio Cardenal Newman, and received a bachelor's degree in civil engineering from the Pontifical Catholic University of Argentina. At this time Macri became interested in neoliberalism and joined the now-defunct Union of the Democratic Centre and a think tank led by former minister Álvaro Alsogaray. In 1985, he briefly attended Columbia Business School, the Wharton School of the University of Pennsylvania and the Universidad del CEMA in Buenos Aires.

Macri's professional experience began at SIDECO Americana, a construction company which was part of his father's Socma Group (Sociedad Macri) holding company, where he worked for three years as a junior analyst and became a senior analyst. In 1984, he worked in the credit department of Citibank Argentina in Buenos Aires. Macri joined Socma Group the same year, and became its general manager in 1985. In 1992, he became vice president of Sevel Argentina (then manufacturing Fiat and Peugeot automobiles under licence in Argentina as part of Socma), and became president two years later.

== Boca Juniors ==
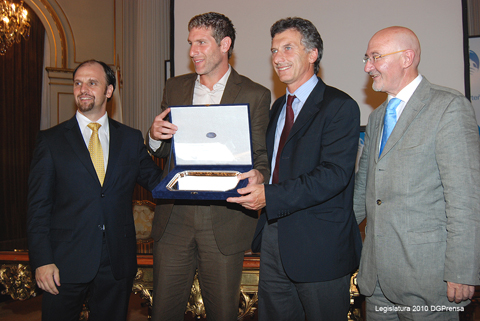
Mauricio Macri and Martín Palermo, football player of Boca Juniors.

Macri intended to run for chairman of sports club Boca Juniors in 1991, but his father convinced him to keep working at Sevel. He tried to buy the Deportivo Español team, but could not get support from the team's board of directors. Macri supported Boca Juniors, paying coach César Luis Menotti's salary and buying players for the team (including forward Walter Perazzo). Franco, skeptical about his son's prospects for success, later allowed him to run Boca Juniors. He instructed aide Orlando Salvestrini to work with Mauricio for two reasons: to help him and to monitor his activities. Mauricio met with former Boca Juniors chairmen Antonio Alegre and Carlos Heller, and tried to convince them to work with him; both rebuffed him. Macri later sought the support of other groups in Boca Juniors, eventually winning the team's internal elections in 1995 with 7,058 votes.

His first years were unsuccessful; the team's performance was poor, players frequently complained about salaries and bonuses, and Macri changed coaches three times. The only initial improvement was a partial reconstruction of the stadium. He arranged for the Boca Juniors institution to operate on the stock exchange, selling shares of active football players owned by the club. Macri's first coach was Carlos Salvador Bilardo, who brought 14 new players to the team and finished the 1996 Apertura league in 10th place. His second coach, Héctor Veira, also performed poorly. New coach Carlos Bianchi helped Juan Román Riquelme improve his performance, and had Martín Palermo and Guillermo Barros Schelotto as effective forwards. They won the first two tournaments, beginning a record 40-match unbeaten run.

During his tenure at the helm of Boca Juniors, the xeneize team obtained sixteen titles, which established him as the president of the institution that has obtained the most football titles, displacing Alberto J. Armando to second place, with twelve total titles.

Macri has been trying to reform the Argentine soccer statutes for almost two decades to allow clubs to become sports limited companies.

== Early political career ==
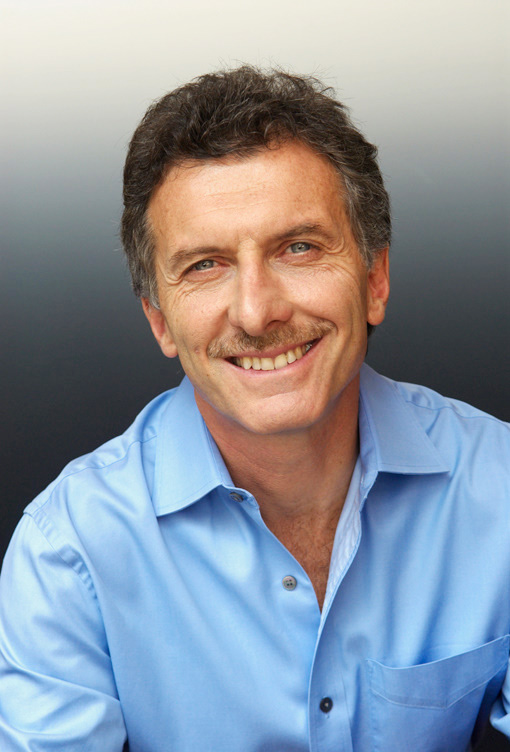
Macri in 2007

In 1991, Macri was kidnapped for 12 days by officers of the Argentine Federal Police. Kept in a small room with a chemical toilet and a hole in the roof to receive food, he was freed when his family reportedly paid a multimillion-dollar ransom. Macri has said that the ordeal led him to enter politics.

Macri entered politics in 2003, founding the centre-right party Commitment to Change (Spanish: Compromiso para el Cambio). The party was intended to be a source of new politicians, since the major parties were discredited after the December 2001 riots. Later that year, Macri ran for mayor of Buenos Aires, alongside Horacio Rodríguez Larreta. Although he won the first round of the election with 37 percent of the vote, he lost the runoff election with 46 percent of the vote going to sitting mayor Aníbal Ibarra, who was re-elected. In 2005, Macri joined Ricardo López Murphy of Recrear in a political coalition, the Republican Proposal (PRO), and was elected to the Chamber of Deputies with 33.9 percent of the vote. His campaigns were managed by Jaime Durán Barba. According to a 2007 report, Macri had participated in only 44 of 321 votings; he countered that he had become disappointed with Congress, since bills sent by the president were not open to debate or amendment. Ibarra was impeached and removed from office in 2006 as a result of the República Cromañón nightclub fire, and his term was completed by vice-chief of government Jorge Telerman.

During 2006, Macri worked both on his political activities as deputy and with his presidency of Boca Juniors. Before the 2007 general elections, he negotiated with the likely presidential candidate Jorge Sobisch, the governor of Neuquén Province, to create a national right-wing political coalition. This conflicted with Macri's alliance with Ricardo López Murphy, who also intended to run for president and had denounced Sobisch for corruption. Later that year, Sobisch's image was severely tarnished when teacher Carlos Fuentealba was killed during a union demonstration in Neuquén.

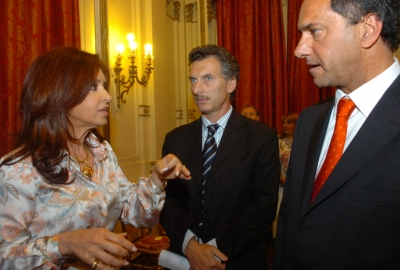
Macri (center) with President Cristina Fernández de Kirchner (left) and Buenos Aires Governor Daniel Scioli (right) in 2008

He immediately backed out of his pact with Sobisch and remained neutral during the national election, which was won by Cristina Fernández de Kirchner of the Front for Victory (FPV).

In February 2007, Macri announced that he would run again for mayor of Buenos Aires, heading the PRO slate with Gabriela Michetti. In the 2 June 2007 first round, he received 45.6 percent of the vote and defeated government-backed Daniel Filmus (who received 23.8 percent of the vote); incumbent Jorge Telerman finished third. In the 24 June runoff election, Macri defeated Filmus with 60.96 percent of the vote.

For the 2009 midterm elections, he allied with Francisco de Narváez and Felipe Solá. The alliance was successful; De Narvaez defeated former president Néstor Kirchner in Buenos Aires Province and Gabriela Michetti won the city election. With this defeat, the Kirchners lost their majority in both chambers of the Congress. Cristina Fernández de Kirchner, whose public image was good after the death and state funeral of Néstor Kirchner in late 2010, ran for re-election. Macri, who was considered a likely candidate for the opposition, ran for re-election as mayor instead. He won the first round on 10 July 2011 with 47.08 percent of the vote against Filmus's 27.78 percent, and then the 31 July runoff against Filmus with 64.25 percent of the vote.

== Buenos Aires administration ==
=== Public transport ===
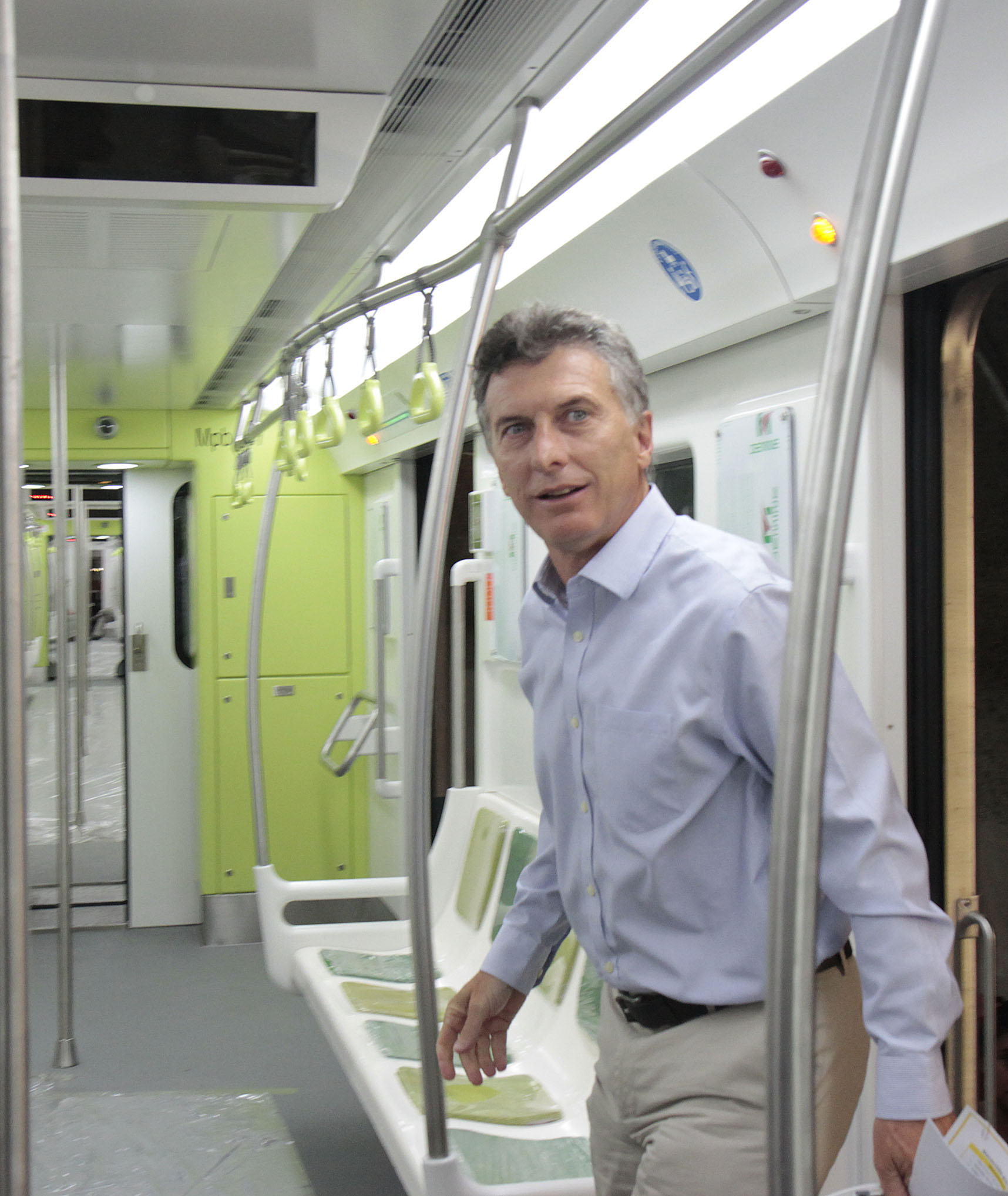
Macri on a 200 Series train on Line A of the Buenos Aires Underground, January 2013

Macri's administration worked on public transport in an attempt to reduce auto traffic in Buenos Aires. One project was the Metrobus, a bus rapid transit system added to the city's main streets. By the end of Macri's term as mayor, the 50.5-kilometre (31.4 mi) system had five lines and 113 stations.

Other streets have bikeways to promote cycling, and the city created its EcoBici bicycle-sharing scheme. By the end of Macri's administration, about 155 km (96 mi) of bicycle lanes were constructed and 49 of the planned 200 automated bicycle-sharing stations were built.

Several level crossings on the city's commuter-rail network were replaced by tunnels to improve road and rail traffic flow. Under Macri, the city committed to two large rail-infrastructure projects: running viaducts through the center of the city to extend the Belgrano Sur Line, and raising the San Martín Line to eliminate level crossings.

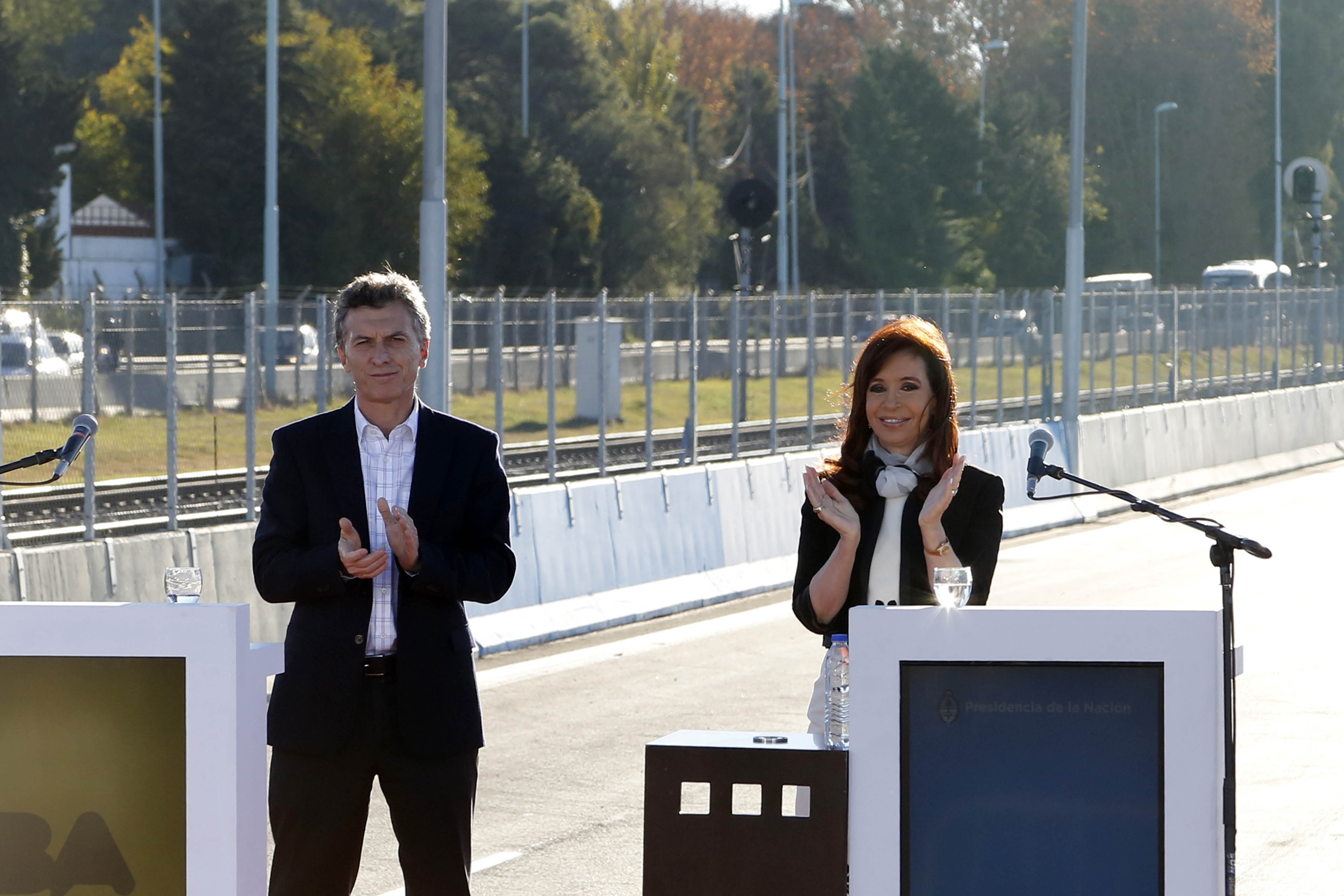
Macri with President Cristina Fernández de Kirchner during the inauguration of Autopista Illia in 2014

Macri proposed the Red de Expresos Regionales project to link the city's main railway terminals and lines with a series of tunnels; as of 2018, in the term of his successor Horacio Rodríguez Larreta, the project is still in the planning stages.

The Buenos Aires Underground, initially maintained by the national government, was the subject of a year-long dispute between him and the Fernández de Kirchner government. The national government sought to transfer it to the city, which Macri supported, but the budget and length of the transition period were contested. He announced that the city would take over the underground on 13 November 2012.

Line A, which was using wooden cars almost a century old, received a fleet of modern cars from the national government; Line H also received new cars. Madrid Metro rolling-stock purchases for Line B were criticised, despite their technical superiority, for having a limited compatibility with the line and costing more than new trains for the city's commuter-rail network.

=== Metropolitan police ===
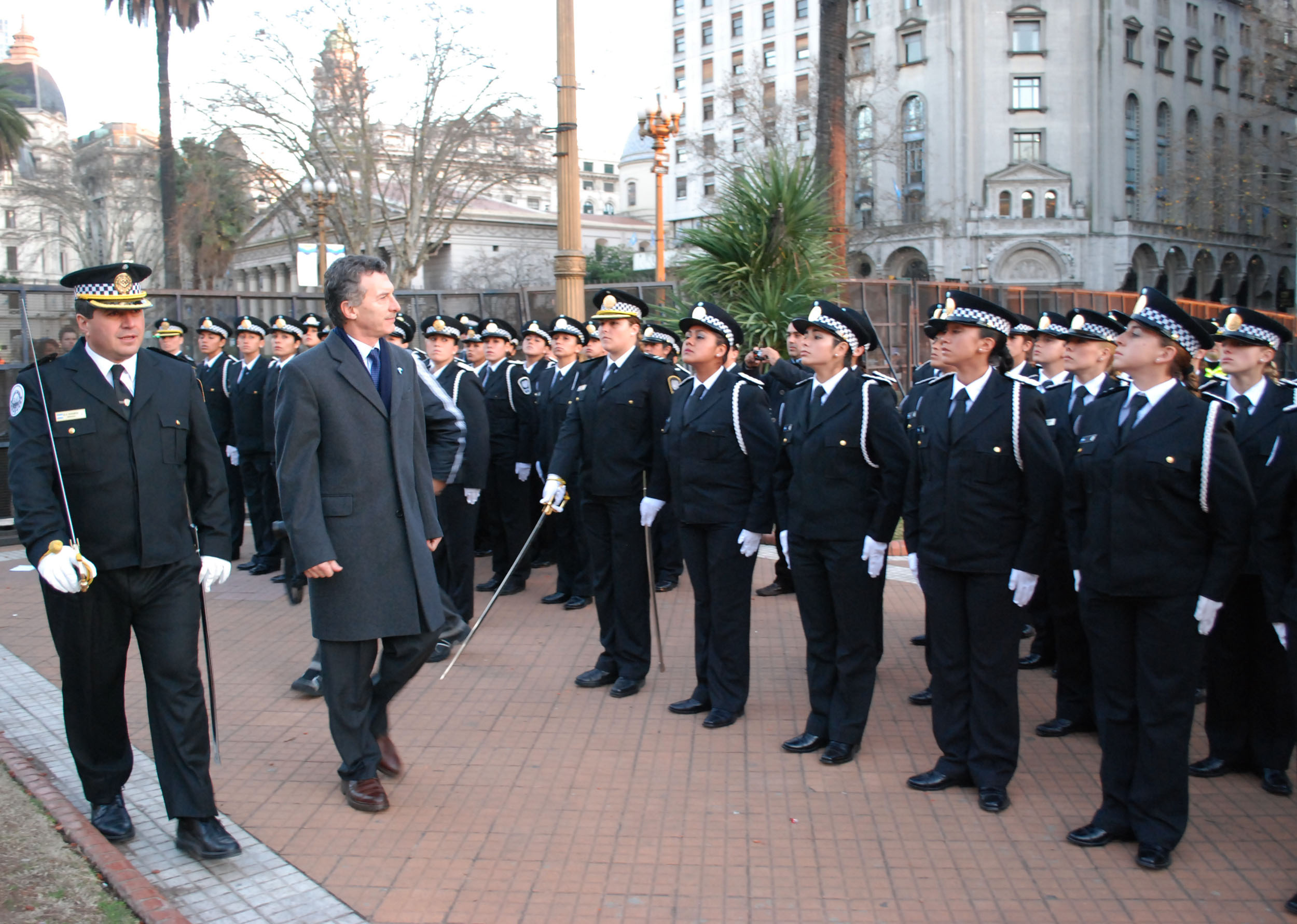
Macri inspecting Metropolitan Police graduates

Buenos Aires, initially a federal district with limited autonomy, had become an autonomous city with the 1994 amendment of the Constitution of Argentina. The Argentine Federal Police, under national-government jurisdiction, still worked in the city and disputes over a potential transfer to a local force were unresolved when Macri was elected. He unsuccessfully tried to negotiate a transfer with President Cristina Fernández de Kirchner. As an alternative, in 2008 Macri proposed a bill for the creation of the Buenos Aires Metropolitan Police to work with federal police in the city. The bill, supported by the PRO and the Kirchnerite blocs, was rejected by Civic Coalition blocs and those aligned with Ibarra. Elisa Carrió, leader of the Civic Coalition, thought that Macri had abandoned the transfer request, and Ibarra said that the forces' duties would overlap. The Metropolitan Police began with nearly 1,000 officers; the Federal Police had 17,000 officers working in the city. As a result, the metropolitan police worked on a small scale during the transition and more complex tasks were reserved for the federal police.

Jorge Alberto Palacios was the first chief of the Metropolitan Police. A member of the police unit which rescued Macri from his kidnappers, Palacios was fired by then-President Néstor Kirchner for his alleged involvement in the murder of Axel Blumberg (for which he was acquitted). His appointment was controversial; Palacios had been investigated for concealing evidence of the 1994 AMIA bombing, and he resigned a short time later. The transfer of police protection to the city was completed during the Larreta administration.

=== Same-sex marriage ===
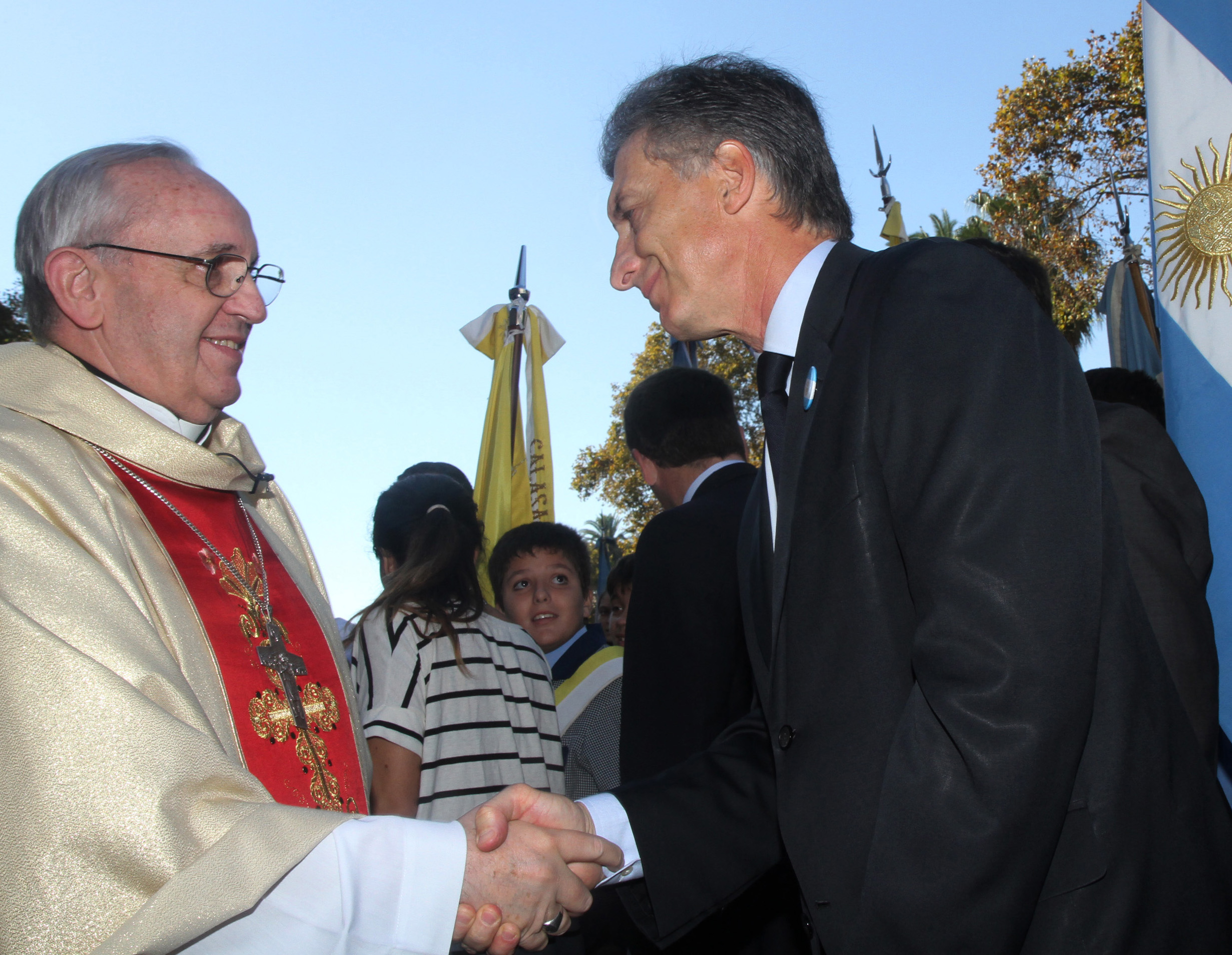
Macri and Archbishop Jorge Bergoglio (later Pope Francis)

A gay couple, José María Di Bello and Alex Freyre, started a judicial case so that they could get married in Buenos Aires. They challenged articles 172 and 188 of the civil code, which restrict marriage to people of different genders, as unconstitutional. Judge Gabriela Seijas agreed, and the couple married in 2009. It was the first same-sex marriage in Argentina. Macri did not appeal the ruling, saying that same-sex marriage was becoming universally accepted and individuals had a right to happiness. He compared the controversy with the sanctioning of divorce during the 1980s after the restoration of democracy in Argentina; highly controversial at first, it was eventually accepted. A federal law permitting same-sex marriage was passed the following year.

Macri's refusal to appeal the sentence affected his relationship with Archbishop Jorge Bergoglio (who later became Pope Francis). Bergoglio opposed same-sex marriage, and expected Macri to appeal the ruling. According to the archbishop, a lower-court judge should not establish the constitutionality of a law and Macri should have appealed the ruling in a higher court. Bergoglio was also annoyed by what he considered a lack of communication between himself and Macri.

== Presidential elections ==
=== 2015 Argentine general election ===
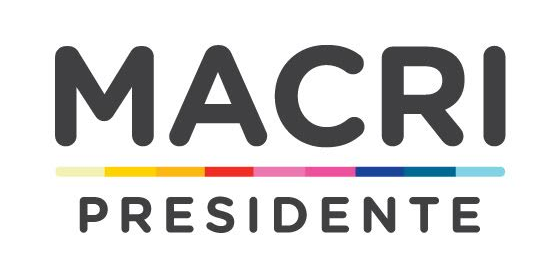
Macri's 2015 presidential campaign logo

Macri ran for president of Argentina in 2015. With President Cristina Kirchner unable to run, early opinion polls indicated a close three-way race between Macri, Kirchnerite governor Daniel Scioli and Tigre mayor Sergio Massa. Other minor parties, such as the Radical Civic Union (UCR), the Civic Coalition (CC) and some socialist parties, made a political coalition, the Broad Front UNEN. This coalition disbanded before the elections, and the UCR and CC made a coalition with the PRO, named Cambiemos (English: Let's change). Macri supported Horacio Rodríguez Larreta against Gabriela Michetti in the PRO primary elections for mayor of Buenos Aires. Larreta won the primary and general elections, and Michetti was selected as Macri's vice-presidential candidate. María Eugenia Vidal, Macri's deputy mayor, ran on the Cambiemos ticket for governor of Buenos Aires Province, a populous province which was strategic to the elections. Macri and Massa negotiated a coalition against Kirchnerism, which would have seen Massa withdraw from the presidential race to run for governor of Buenos Aires on the Cambiemos ticket. Macri declined this proposal, kept Vidal as the party's candidate for governor, and Massa ran for president with his own party.

Macri, Carrió and Ernesto Sanz ran in the primary elections, which Macri won. Pre-election polls indicated that Scioli would win by a wide margin, possibly avoiding a ballotage. The final results showed Scioli finishing first with 37.08 percent, just ahead of Macri's 34.15 percent, leading to a ballotage round on 22 November. Massa finished third with 21 percent of the vote, and the other two candidates contended for his voters. Scioli and Macri were polarized about the presidency of Cristina Kirchner; Scioli wanted to keep most Kirchnerite policies, and Macri wanted to change them. In the legislative elections, the Front for Victory (FPV) lost its majority in the Chamber of Deputies but kept it in the Senate.

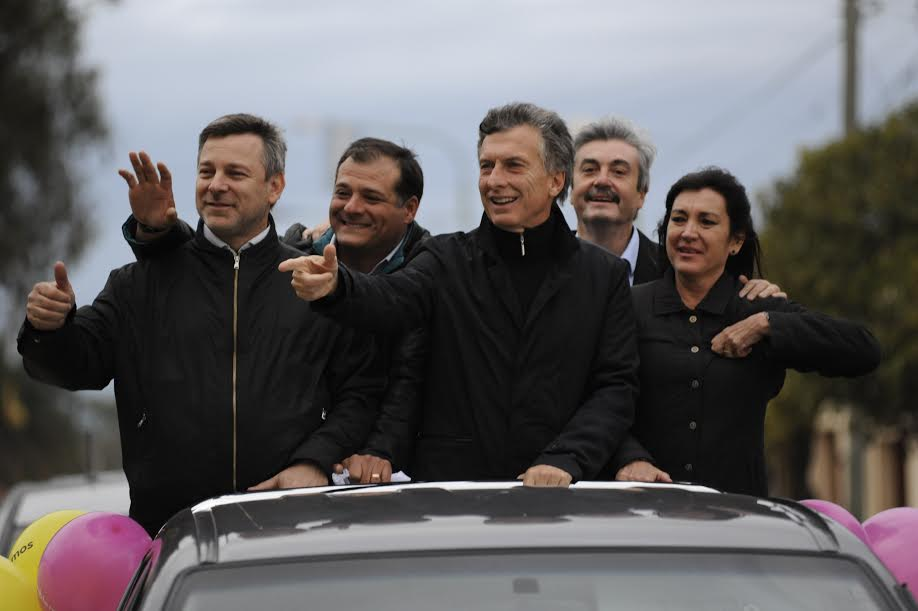
Macri campaigning in Cordoba, in August 2015

Scioli did not participate in the first presidential debate, which was held with the other five candidates. When the ballotage was confirmed, Macri agreed to a debate with Scioli. Two debates were planned: one by the Argentina Debate NGO and another by TV news channel Todo Noticias (TN). Macri preferred a single debate, and opted for the one organized by Argentina Debate.

He criticized Scioli for negative campaigning by the FPV. Several politicians and FPV institutions had issued warnings about what might happen if Macri were elected president. According to Scioli, the campaign was intended to encourage public awareness. It was rumored that the campaign might have been suggested by Brazilian political consultant João Santana, who had organized a similar campaign in Brazil during the ballotage of Dilma Rousseff and Aécio Neves in the 2014 Brazilian general election.

The ballotage was held on 22 November. Scioli conceded with 70 percent of the votes counted and provisional results of 53 and 47 percent. The gap between the candidates slowly narrowed over the next few hours, giving Macri a smaller margin of victory than most exit polls suggested. His election ended a dozen years of Kirchnerism in Argentina.

For The Economist, this was the "end of populism." Macri's victory could transform his country and the region.

Macri owed his victory to Córdoba, the second-largest province, swinging dramatically to support him; he carried the province by over 930,000 votes in the second round, far exceeding his nationwide margin of 680,600 votes. Buenos Aires also swung hard to Macri, giving its mayor over 64 percent of the vote in the second round.

=== 2019 Argentine general election ===
On 11 August 2019, Macri scored the primary election which gave him renomination as his party's candidate in the 2019 general election. He was renominated, but scored only 32%, compared to 47% to populist Peronist Alberto Fernández and his running mate, two-term former president Cristina Kirchner, in their primary for Frente de Todos.

In the 27 October general election, Fernández won the presidency by attaining 48.1% of the vote to Macri's 40.4%, exceeding the threshold required to win without the need for a ballotage.

Alberto Fernández emerged from an electrifying election night as Argentina's next president, without the need for a ballottage, despite Mauricio Macri's surprising rebound from the primaries.

== Presidency ==
Presidential styles of Mauricio Macri
- Reference style: Excelentísimo Señor Presidente de la Nación (Most Excellent President of the Nation)
- Spoken style: Presidente de la Nación (President of the Nation)
- Alternative style: Señor Presidente (Mister President)

=== Inauguration ===
Macri announced his cabinet on 25 November 2015, about two weeks before he was due to take office. The presidential transition was difficult. Macri and Kirchner met briefly; she provided no help to the new administration, and spoke only about the inauguration ceremony. They disagreed about its location; Kirchner wanted it to take place at the Palace of the Argentine National Congress, and Macri favoured the White Hall of the Casa Rosada. Plans for violence against Macri supporters near the Plaza during the inauguration were rumoured, and it was unclear who would control the police during the ceremony. Judge María Servini de Cubría ruled that Kirchner's term of office ended at midnight on the morning of 10 December, and provisional Senate president Federico Pinedo was in charge of the executive branch for the 12 hours between the end of Kirchner's term and Macri's swearing-in. Kirchner left Buenos Aires that day to attend the inauguration of sister-in-law Alicia Kirchner as governor of Santa Cruz Province.

Macri took office on 10 December. He took the oath of office at the National Congress of Argentina after Vice President Gabriela Michetti. Macri delivered a 27-minute speech pledging "support for an independent judiciary, to fight corruption and drug trafficking, the internal union of Argentina, universal social protection, a 21st-century style of education and for everyone to have a roof, water and sewer" and greeted his electoral rivals.

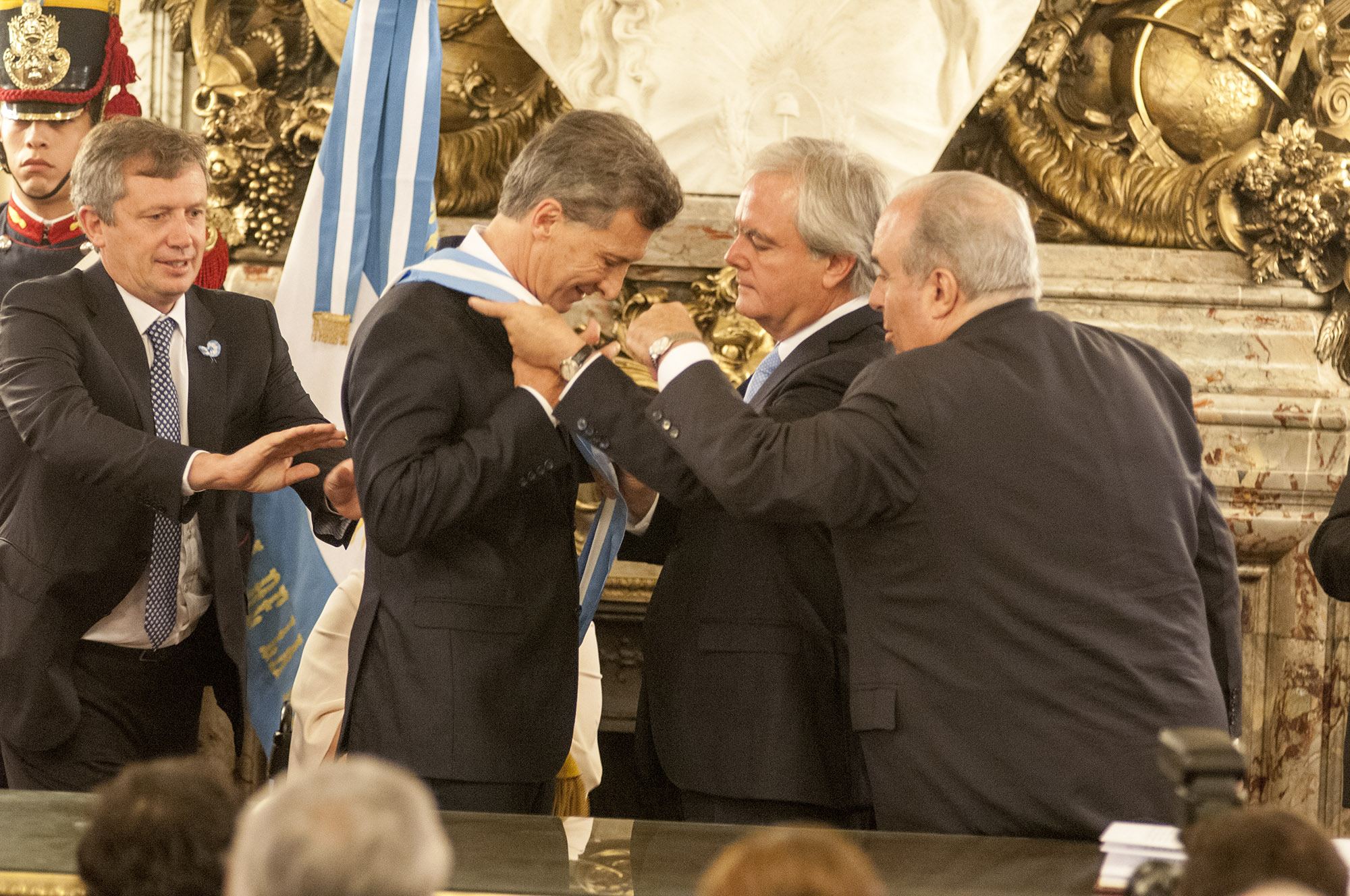
Macri receives the presidential sash from acting president Federico Pinedo.

He later went to the Casa Rosada and received the presidential sash in the White Hall from Senate President Federico Pinedo, accompanied by Michetti, Chamber of Deputies President Emilio Monzó and Supreme Court President Ricardo Lorenzetti. Minutes later, Macri went to the balcony and told the crowd in the Plaza de Mayo that "Argentines deserve to live better, and we are about to start a wonderful period for our country. I promise to always tell the truth and show where our problems are". He called on "all Argentines to follow [his] administration and alert them when [the government] makes mistakes". After his swearing-in, Macri hosted a reception at the Ministry of Foreign Affairs' San Martín Palace for heads of state Michelle Bachelet (Chile), Horacio Cartes (Paraguay), Juan Manuel Santos (Colombia), Rafael Correa (Ecuador), Evo Morales (Bolivia), Dilma Rousseff (Brazil) and King Juan Carlos I of Spain, and representatives of other countries who attended his inauguration.

=== Economic policy ===
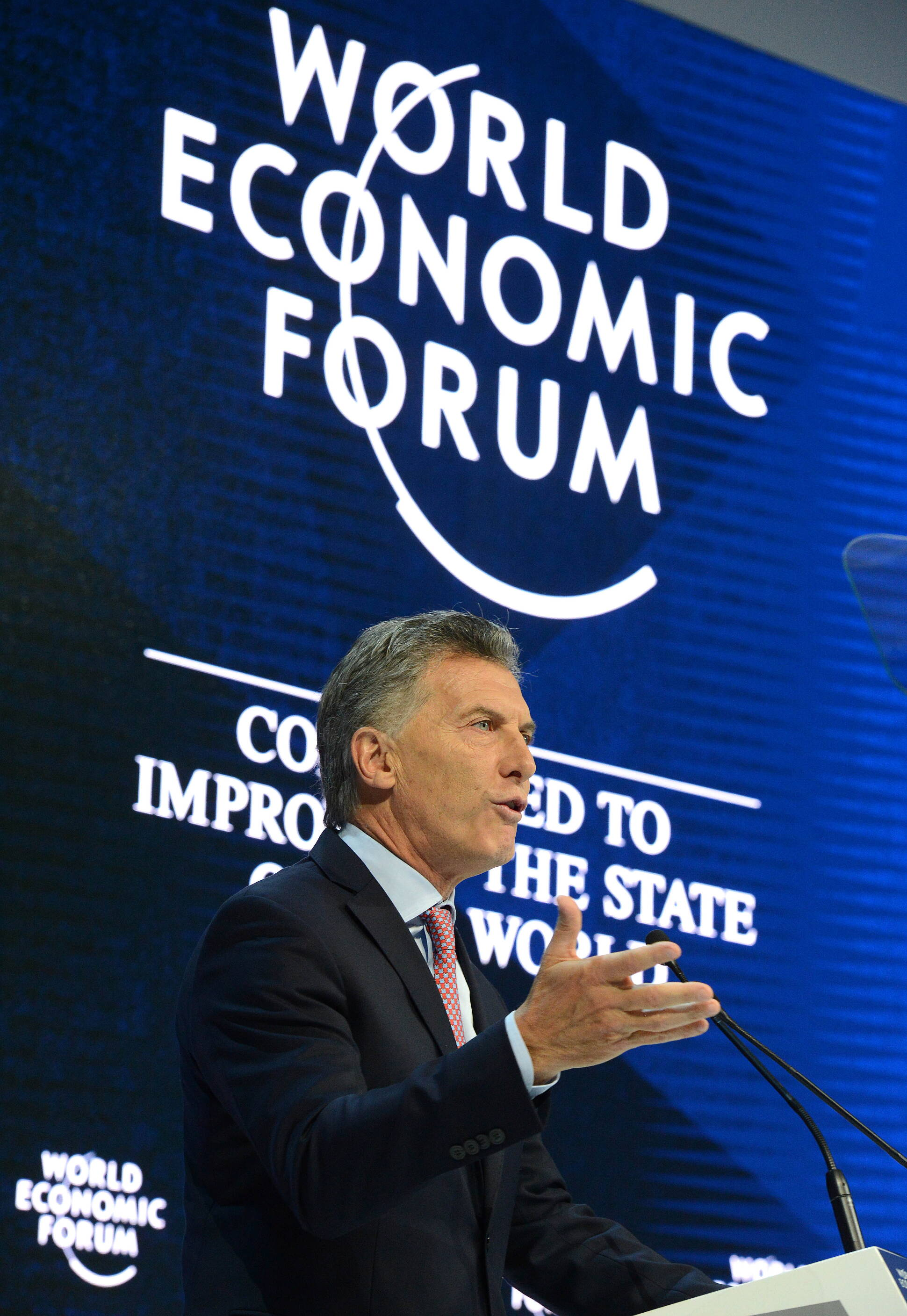
Macri at the World Economic Forum, January 2018.

Macri began his presidency with economic difficulties carried over from previous governments. The Central Bank of Argentina's reserves were depleted; inflation was over 30 percent, although the widely discredited National Institute of Statistics and Census of Argentina (INDEC) provided a lower figure. The country had the highest tax rates in its history, but the government budget balance had an eight-percent deficit. There had been a sovereign default since 2001, and a conflict existed with hedge funds; tight currency controls had been in place since 2011. Since Argentina is a developing country, a global drop in commodity prices reduced trade revenue.

One of Macri's first economic policies was the removal of currency controls, allowing Argentines to freely buy and sell foreign currencies. Argentina has had a floating exchange rate since then, with intervention from the Central Bank, and the Argentine peso was devalued by 30 percent. Another early policy was the removal of export quotas and tariffs on corn and wheat. Tariffs on soybeans, the most lucrative Argentine export, were reduced from 35 to 30 percent.

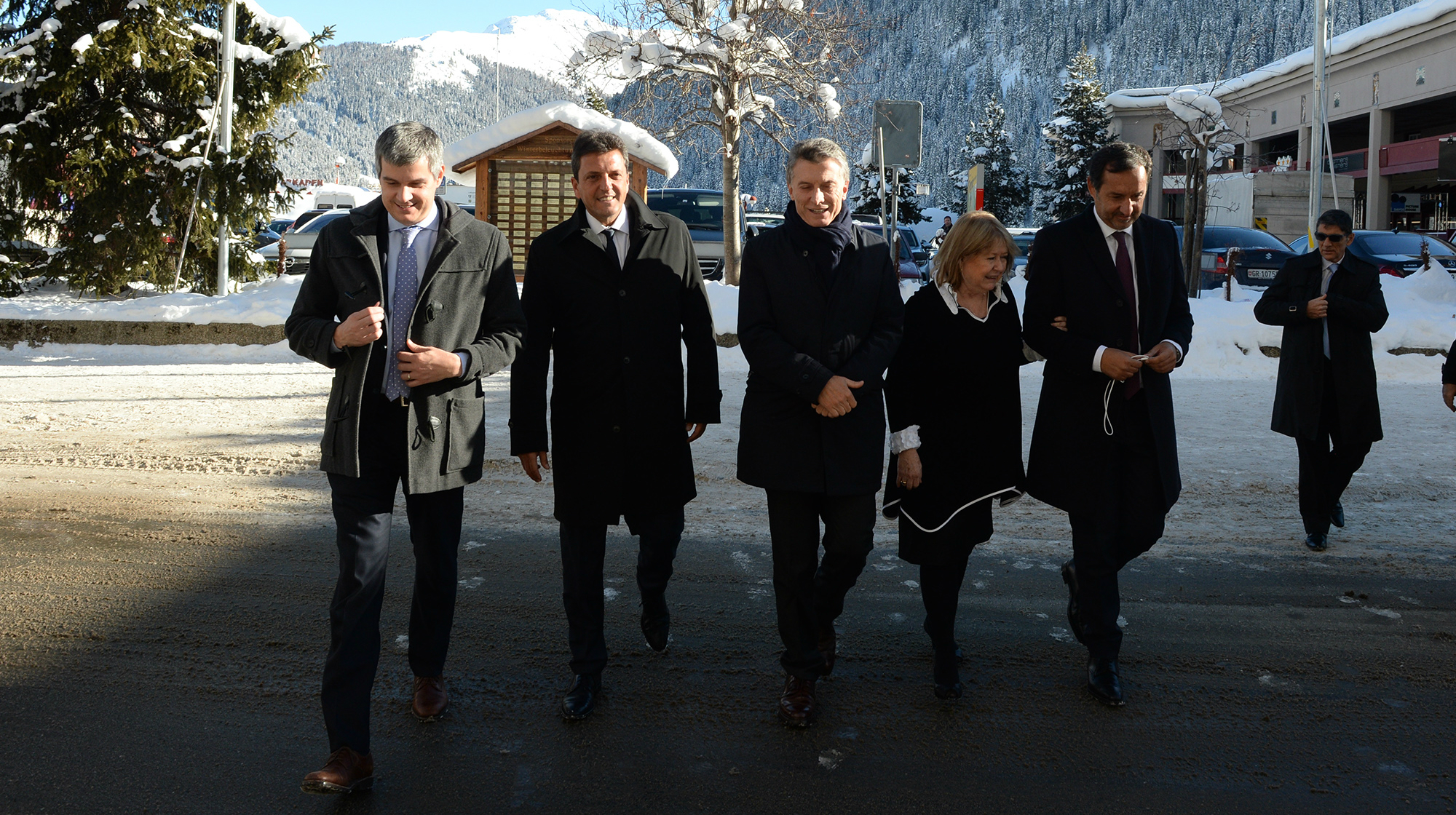
Argentine delegation to the World Economic Forum in Davos, in 2016. It was the return of the country to the conference after 11 years of absence.

Macri wanted to negotiate with holdouts and end the default to return to the international capital markets and strengthen the national economy. Argentina offered to pay $6.5 billion to settle lawsuits on 5 February 2016, requesting that the prior ruling on its payments be lifted. Although Cambiemos did not have a majority in either house of Congress, the bill was approved in March and Argentina faced a court hearing in New York on 13 April. The court upheld judge Thomas P. Griesa's ruling, allowing Argentina to pay the 2005 and 2010 bondholders to whom it was still in default. The payment, made with a bond sale, was reportedly the end of the Argentine default, which had begun in 2001.

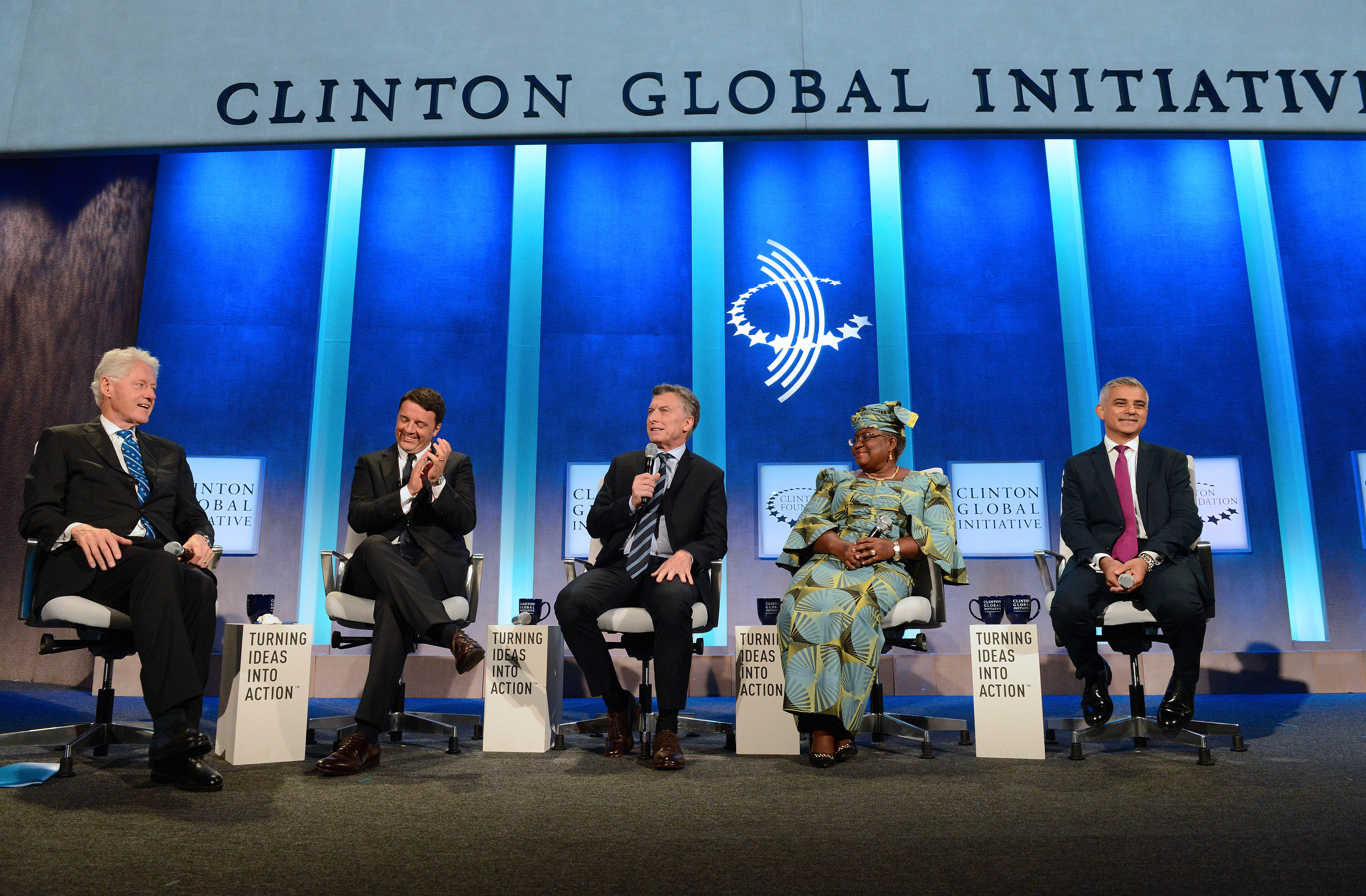
Macri with former president Bill Clinton, Italian prime minister Matteo Renzi, economist Ngozi Okonjo-Iweala and London mayor Sadiq Khan at the Clinton Global Initiative

On 19 January 2016, Macri attended the World Economic Forum in Davos, Switzerland, with opposition figure Sergio Massa and part of his cabinet, in a search for investors. He was one of the best-known figures at the meeting, along with Canadian prime minister Justin Trudeau and US vice president Joe Biden. It was the first time since 2003 that Argentina had participated in the forum.

During Macri's first year, economic recovery was slow. Unemployment and inflation remained high and growth did not come as expected. Kirchner's Careful Pricing price-control program, which benefited small and medium-sized enterprises, was kept with a revision of its included products. The government began several public-works projects to stimulate the economy and help the construction sector. Political intervention in the INDEC figures ended, and the International Monetary Fund (IMF) declared in November 2016 that Argentine statistics were again in accordance with international standards. The Organisation for Economic Co-operation and Development (OECD) estimated that Argentina would emerge from recession in 2017 or 2018, and lowered its country risk classification from seven points to six.

Inflation continued to be a problem, with a rate of 25% in 2017, second only to Venezuela in South America and the highest rate in the G20. On 28 December, the Central Bank of Argentina together with the Treasury announced a change of the inflation target. This was seen by the market as a relaxation of the monetary policy. They attempted to reduce it to 15%, but these efforts failed.

Between 2017 and 2018 the government cut import tariffs on capital goods and eliminated tariffs on the importation of technology products to encourage investment.

The deregulation area allowed the incorporation of low cost airlines, such as JetSmart, Norwegian and Flybondi.

The economy worsened in 2018: inflation remained high, due in part to a trade deficit. The production of soy, the country's main export, had been reduced by a drought which was among the worst natural disasters in the world that year. The US Federal Reserve increased its interest rates, which raised the price of the US dollar against other currencies. The Central Bank of Argentina increased the interest rate to 60 percent, but could not hold off inflation.

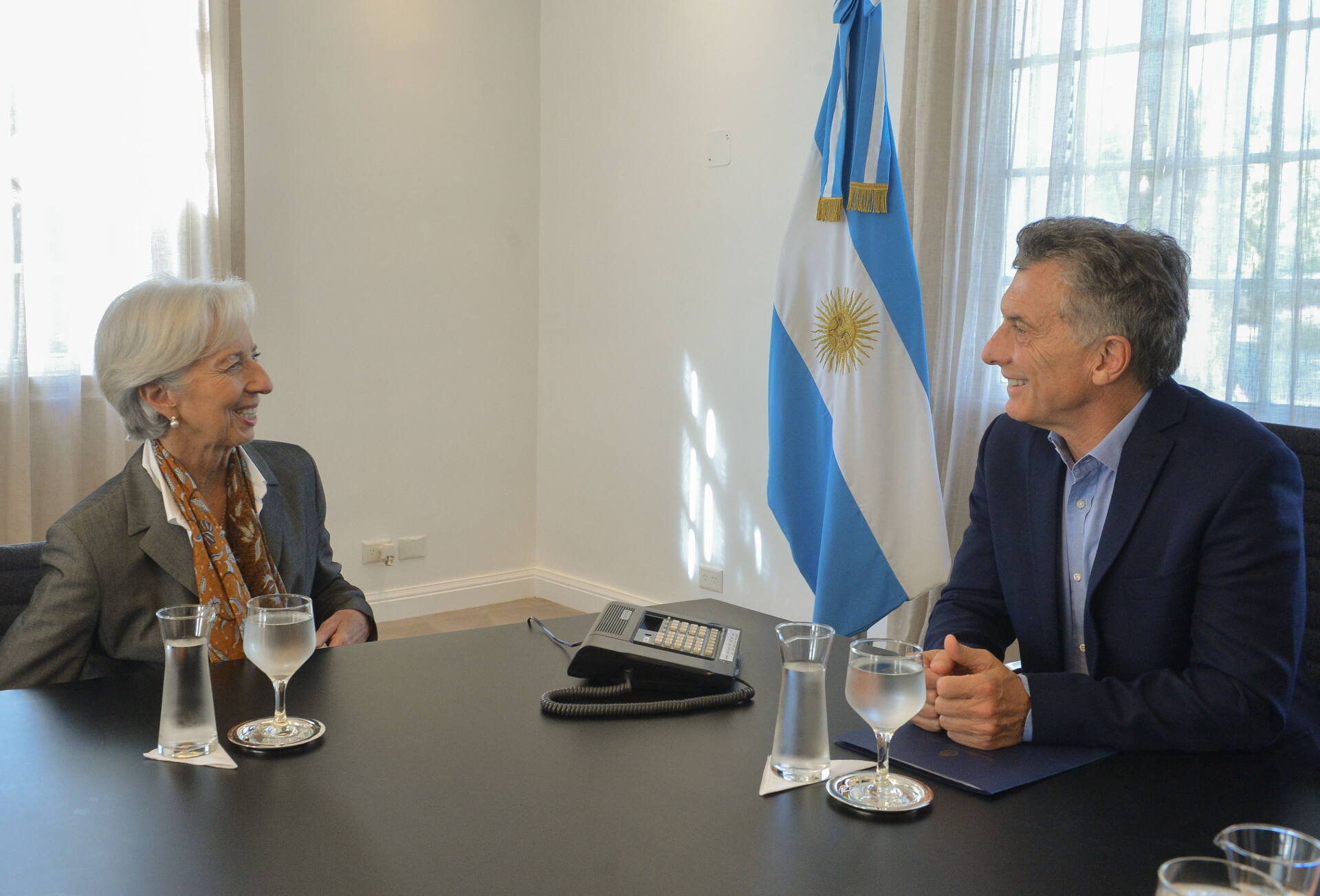
Macri negotiating the loan with Christine Lagarde, Managing Director of the IMF.

Macri announced on 8 May that Argentina would seek a loan from the IMF. The initial loan was US$50bn. Federico Sturzenegger, president of the Central Bank, resigned a week later. Macri replaced him with Luis Caputo, and merged the ministries of treasury and finances into a single ministry led by Nicolás Dujovne. The US–Turkey diplomatic conflict caused a new increase on the US dollar. As a result of the crisis, the tariffs on soy exports were restored. Caputo resigned, and Guido Sandleris replaced him as president of the Central Bank. The IMF expanded the loan with an extra 7 billion, on the condition that the Central Bank would only adjust the price of the peso against the US dollar under certain conditions.

For 2019, the government accelerated the austerity plans, with less expenses and more taxes, to completely remove the fiscal deficit.

=== Energy policy ===
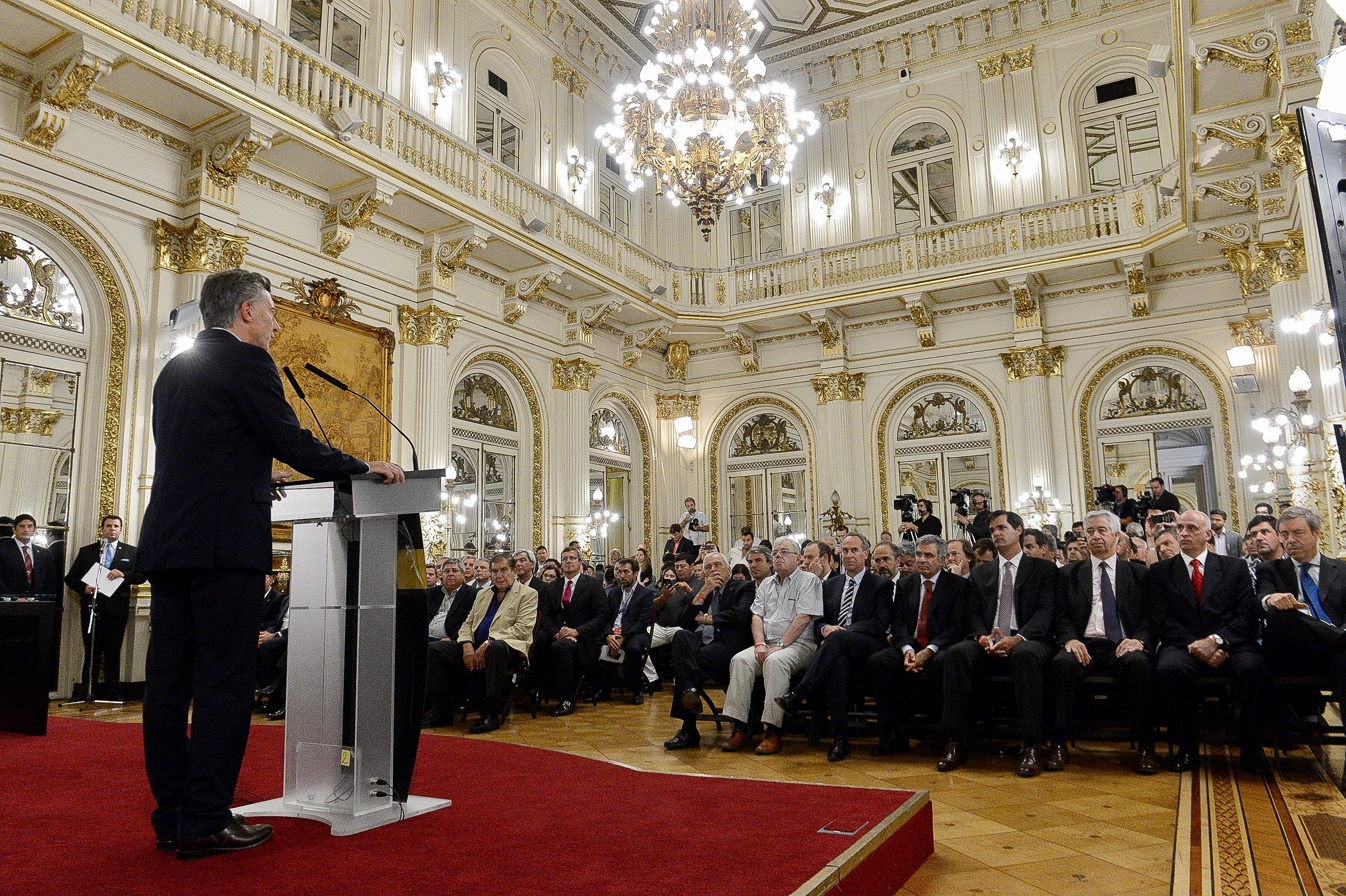
Macri announcing an investment deal for the Vaca Muerta shale deposit in Patagonia

Prices for public utilities, such as electricity, gas and water, were fixed in 2002 by president Eduardo Duhalde during the 1998–2002 Argentine great depression. The Kirchners kept them fixed, and the state subsidized them to compensate for inflation, which rose by nearly 700 percent during their government. Investment in the utility sectors decreased, and generation and distribution networks deteriorated. Argentina lost its self-sufficiency, and went from an energy exporter to an importer. The cost of energy imports increased the trade deficit and the inflation rate, and power outages became frequent. The Kirchners left the grid on the brink of collapse, while their lavish subsidies were a large factor in the fiscal deficit that harmed the overall economy.

In 2016, Minister Juan José Aranguren arranged the removal of state subsidies for electricity, gas and water, which caused a huge increase in prices for those utilities. The increases were met with protests in several cities. Because mandatory public hearings had not been held on the price increases, these were annulled by the courts. The Supreme Court upheld a temporary halt of the price increase for residential customers in September 2016.

Seeking to increase energy production, Macri signed an investment deal for the Vaca Muerta shale deposit in Patagonia. Roughly the size of Belgium, Vaca Muerta has the second-largest reserve of shale gas in the world. To finalise the deal, the unions negotiated flexibility in labour costs, which had been the main drawback to industrial development in the area. The Neuquén Province government pledged to improve roads and general infrastructure.

=== Human rights ===
Human rights organizations had aligned themselves with the governments of both Néstor and Cristina Kirchner, even in topics unrelated to human rights, and often worked as their spokesmen. They continued this role after 2015, when Macri defeated the Kirchnerite candidate in the presidential elections, which undermined the legitimacy of the organizations in Argentine society. Macri maintained a distant relation with those organizations, and did not seek their support, but did not openly confront them. They kept their funding and the institutions under their control, and the trials of military personnel for crimes in the Dirty War (1974–1983) continued. Nevertheless, the organizations continued their opposition to Macri. His cabinet was divided on an approach to take: whether to directly confront the organizations and remove their state financing, or to take an active role in their activities and replace their leaders with less politically motivated figures. The general policy, however, was to ignore the disputes and focus the activities of the government towards more pressing matters, such as the economy.

The government modified the public holiday for the Day of Remembrance for Truth and Justice, which makes reference to the 1976 Argentine coup d'état, to allow it to be celebrated on a movable date. This ruling was met with huge criticism. The ruling was reverted some days later, and the holiday was kept at the fixed date of 24 March.

=== Social issues ===
The #NiUnaMenos movement, which advanced a feminist agenda in Argentina since 2015, stayed strong during the Macri presidency. Macri said during the 2018 opening of the National Congress that, although he was anti-abortion, he wanted the Congress to have an abortion debate and discuss a bill for a new abortion law. As of 2018, abortion was only legally allowed for rapes and cases that may threaten the mother's health. The feminist movement organized several demonstrations in the following months, in support of the voluntary termination of pregnancy abortion bill that was proposed in Congress. The proposal, however, became highly polarizing. The country has a strong conservative catholic population, particularly in the less-populated provinces, who rejected the bill. This polarization was unrelated to the political polarization of the country, and the legislators of both Cambiemos and the Justicialist Party (PJ) were divided on the vote. The bill was approved by the Chamber of Deputies in June, but opposition became more organized after its approval and the Senate rejected the bill, by 38 to 31 votes.

In December 2017, police officer Luis Chocobar killed a fleeing man who had stabbed an American tourist in La Boca, Buenos Aires. Macri hosted him in early 2018 and hailed him as a hero. His administration would later enact the "Chocobar doctrine", broadening the rights of police officer to exercise lethal force when responding to criminal cases.

=== Foreign relations ===
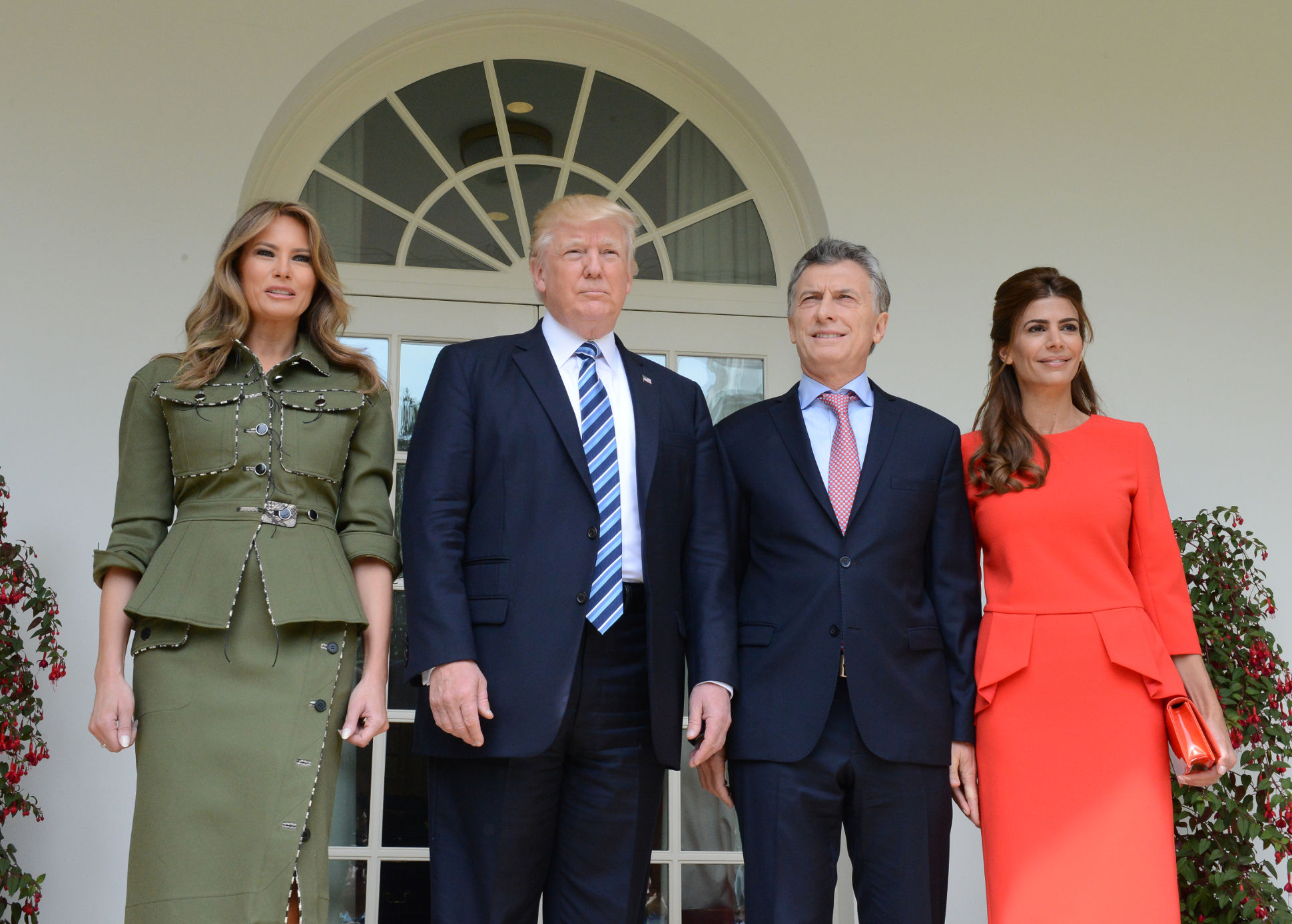
Mauricio Macri, US president Donald Trump and their respective first ladies, at the White House in the United States

During Macri's presidency, Argentina's foreign relations shifted substantially from those under Kirchner. He immediately proposed action against Nicolás Maduro in Venezuela for human-rights abuses and to remove that country from Mercosur. This shift was part of a change in the Latin American pink tide. The other countries in the bloc also opposed Maduro's socialist government, and prevented Venezuela from taking the pro tempore presidency of Mercosur. The bloc sought a trade and cooperation agreement with the European Union and closer ties with the Pacific Alliance. Macri agreed with Brazilian president Michel Temer to guarantee free trade between their countries. Macri and Temer increased their interest in better trade relations with Mexico, the second-largest economy in Latin America, after Mexican-American relations started to turn sour under the Trump administration.

Argentina and Venezuela had troubled relations at the time. The 2017 Venezuelan Constituent Assembly election was considered illegal by Argentina, which does not acknowledge the legislative body established by it. Macri also removed the Order of the Liberator General San Martín award from Maduro. Argentina signed the Declaration of Lima, which established the Lima Group, a supranational body of countries that consider Venezuela to be under a dictatorship and want to restore its democracy. Maduro was re-elected in the 2018 Venezuelan presidential election and took office for a new term on 10 January 2019. This started the 2019 Venezuelan presidential crisis, as many countries believed that Maduro had committed electoral fraud. Argentina and Brazil, under the newly elected Jair Bolsonaro, refused to acknowledge Maduro as a legitimate ruler. They instead acknowledged Juan Guaidó, who was appointed president of Venezuela by the National Assembly. Furthermore, during the Venezuelan uprising attempt of April 2019, Macri supported anti-Maduro military forces and reiterated his position of recognizing Guaidó as legitimate President of Venezuela.

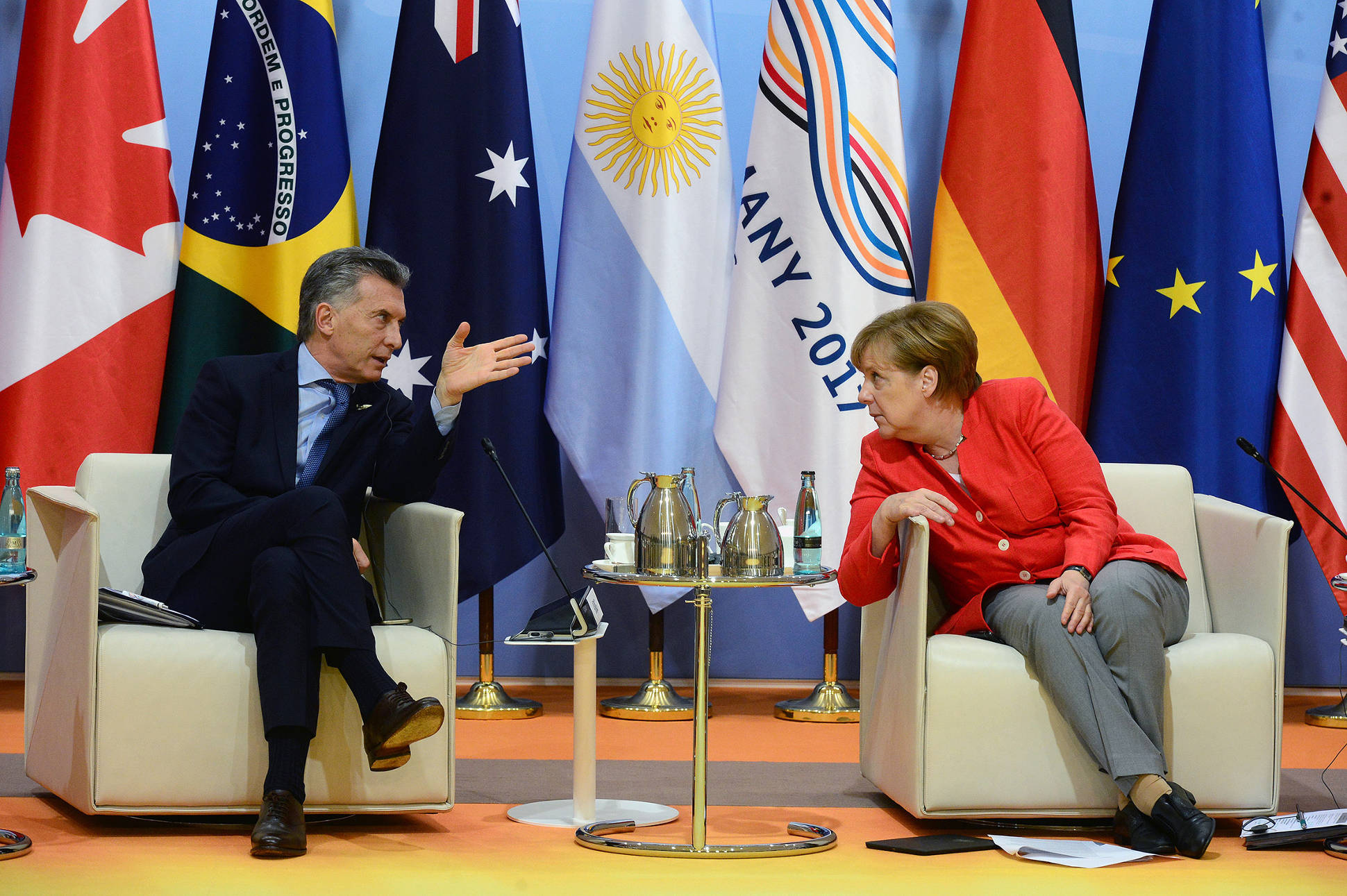
Macri and German chancellor Angela Merkel during the 2017 G20 Summit in Hamburg

Macri also shifted Argentina's relations with the United States. During a visit in 2016, president Barack Obama praised him: "I'm impressed because he has moved rapidly on so many of the reforms that he promised, to create more sustainable and inclusive economic growth, to reconnect Argentina with the global economy and the world community". Obama announced that the US would declassify its military and intelligence records of the 1970s Dirty War. Foreign Minister Susana Malcorra supported Democrat Hillary Clinton in the 2016 US presidential election, which was won by Republican Donald Trump. Macri tried to remain in good terms with the US after the Trump was elected president. In 2019, Trump declassified more than 5,600 US documents about the Dirty War.

Macri maintained the Argentine claim in the Falkland Islands sovereignty dispute. However, he took a less-confrontational stance towards the United Kingdom and allowed more flights between Argentina and the islands. Relations between Argentina and the UK improved greatly, but both Argentine and the United Kingdom maintain their respective claim on the islands.

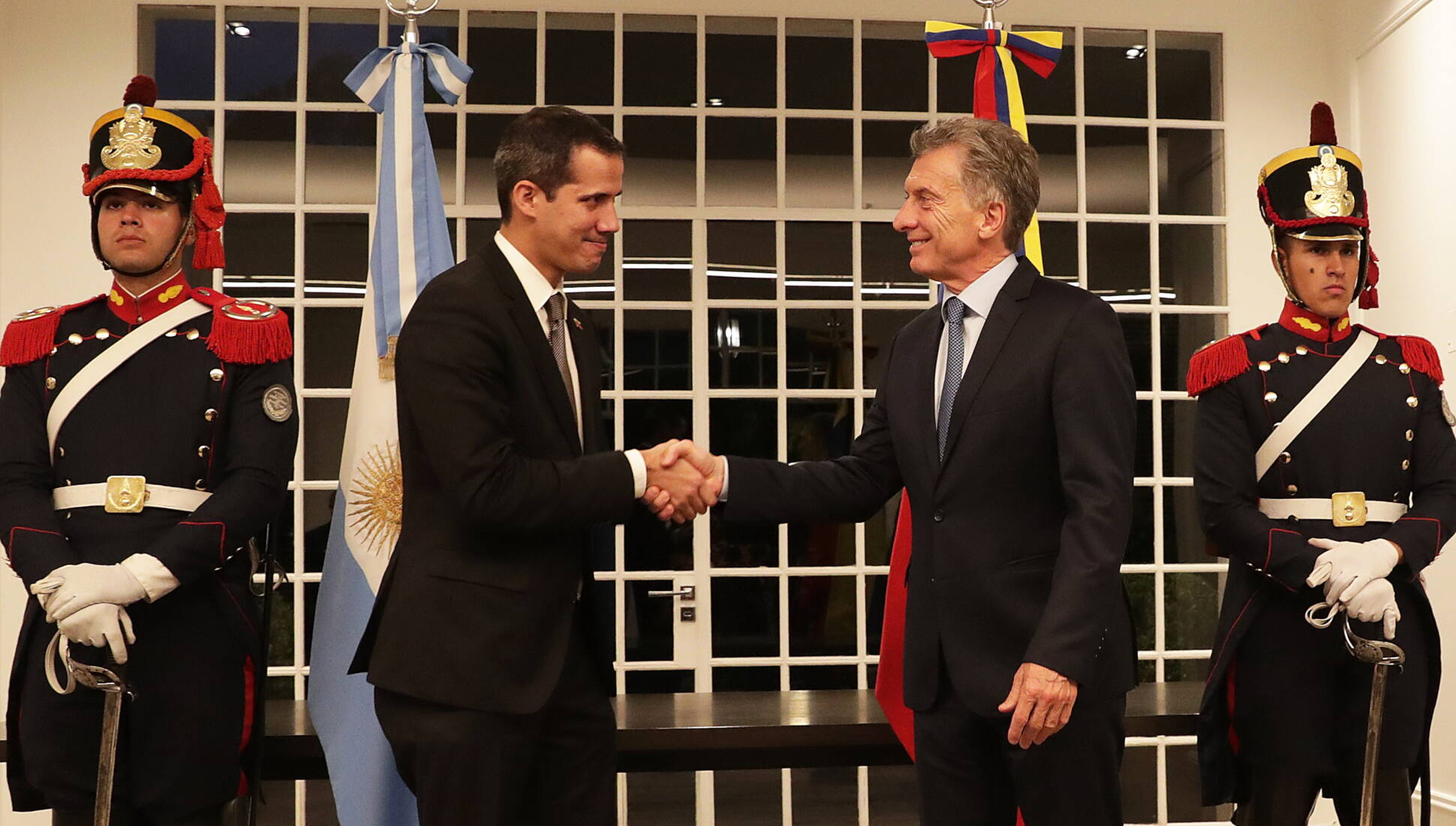
Macri acknowledged Juan Guaidó as president of Venezuela during the 2019 Venezuelan presidential crisis.

Macri changed Argentina's position on conflicts in the Middle East. During Macri's first week in office, he voided the memorandum of understanding between Argentina and Iran, which would have established a joint investigation of the 1994 AMIA bombing, a terrorist attack on a Jewish organization for which Argentina had blamed Hezbollah and Iran. The memorandum had been ruled unconstitutional by the judiciary, a ruling which was appealed during Kirchner's presidency. Macri withdrew the appeal, upholding the original ruling. He distanced himself from Iran and encouraged continued investigations of the AMIA bombing and the death of Alberto Nisman, a prosecutor investigating the case. Those cases and Nisman's probe into Cristina Kirchner involvement with Iran have special importance for Argentina–Israel relations, and ambassador Carlos Faustino García and Israeli diplomat Modi Efraim praised Macri for encouraging the investigations. Macri further improved relations with Israel and in September 2017, Prime Minister Benjamin Netanyahu became the first Israeli Prime Minister to ever visit Argentina. In July 2016, it was announced that Argentina would grant asylum to 3,000 refugees of the Syrian Civil War. In July 2019, Macri designated Hezbollah as a terrorist organization in relation to the Israeli embassy bombing, and especially related to the AMIA bombing.

=== Midterm elections ===
Mauricio Macri during the electoral campaign of 2017

The 2017 Argentine legislative election renewed a third of the seats in the Senate and half in the chamber of deputies. The election was considered a referendum on the presidency of Macri up to that point. Kirchner, leader of the opposition, ran for senator for the populous Buenos Aires province. She left the PJ to avoid the primary elections and created a new party, Citizen's Unity. Esteban Bullrich, minister of education, was the candidate of Cambiemos in the district. Kirchner and Bullrich had a close tie in the primary election, and Kirchner prevailed by just 0.21 percent of the vote.

The electoral campaign, however, was largely ignored, as the media was focused on the ongoing controversy over the disappearance of Santiago Maldonado (see below). Kirchner used the case in her political campaign, stating that Maldonado was the victim of a forced disappearance, similar to those of the Dirty War. Maldonado was found dead a few days before the general elections, and the circumstances and autopsy refuted Kirchner's theory. Cambiemos won in thirteen of the twenty-three provinces of Argentina, and in the five most-populated districts. Kirchner ended in a distant second place, as a result of the higher turnout for the general elections.

== Controversies ==
=== Wiretapping case ===
Sergio Burstein was the leader of a group of people whose relatives died in the AMIA bombing. Macri was charged in a 2010 wiretapping case, suspected of spying on Burstein and his brother-in-law Néstor Daniel Leonardo. Macri denied the charges. Judge Norberto Oyarbide indicted him, and Federal Chamber members Eduardo Farah, Eduardo Freiler and Jorge Ballestero confirmed the indictment. It was suspected at the time that Macri had organized a clandestine spy network with the aid of Jorge Alberto Palacios and Ciro James. The case was transferred to judge Sebastián Casanello, who ordered further investigation. It was learned that Macri had little knowledge about Palacios' daily activities and his minister, Mariano Narodowski, had appointed James. Franco Macri, the president's father, admitted to hiring private agencies to spy on Daniel Leonardo.

Although Casanello dismissed the charges in 2015, Leonardo appealed the ruling; the dismissal was upheld several months later in federal court. Farah, Freiler and Ballestero voted for acquittal; others involved in the case, including Palacios, are still under investigation.

=== Panama Papers ===
In 2016, the Panama Papers were leaked, comprising 11.5 million documents detailing offshore entities owned by people from many countries. Macri was listed as a director of Fleg Trading from 1998 to 2009. He did not declare his involvement in 2007, when he became mayor, or in 2015, when he became president. Prosecutor Federico Delgado asked the judiciary to determine if Macri "maliciously failed to complete his tax declaration". Macri argued that he did not report his involvement because he was not a stakeholder and did not receive money from it. The company was established by his father to run a failed Brazilian business. Macri owns other foreign accounts with properly-disclosed transactions, and said that he would file a judicial "declaration of certainty" to affirm his statements. A similar company, Kagemusha, was discovered several months later. It was established in 1981 by Franco Macri, with his then-22-year-old son as its vice president.

On 20 September 2017, civil judge Andrés Fraga determined that, in Fleg Trading Ltd, Mauricio Macri accepted the position of director for the sole and only effect of designating a replacement and resigning, and that in Kagemusha he did not even tacitly accept the position of director for which he was appointed by Franco Macri. The ruling added that he was not a shareholder in either of the two companies, that he did not receive any dividends or profits, did not participate in the business decisions, nor was he the owner or co-owner of any current bank account of the companies.

=== Detention of Milagro Sala ===
Gerardo Morales of the UCR was elected governor of Jujuy Province in the 2015 elections. Although the UCR was part of Cambiemos in federal politics, it was allied with Sergio Massa in the province. Morales was the first non-Peronist governor in the province since 1983. He opposed activist Milagro Sala, accusing her of leading a government parallel to that of Eduardo Fellner. According to Morales, Sala led a violent and coercive group and children were forced to join her party to attend school. When he was elected governor, Morales ordered all organizations to operate though banks instead of on a cash basis to retain their legal standing. Sala began a protest in front of the government plaza, but most of her supporters accepted Morales's edict. Prosecutor Viviana Montiel asked local judge Raúl Gutiérrez to order Sala's arrest for causing a disturbance and encouraging crime. Gutiérrez agreed, and Sala was arrested on 16 January 2016.

After Sala's arrest, she was charged with embezzlement in connection with housing construction. Although her initial charges were dropped, she remained in jail on the later ones. The case generated international criticism, and the United Nations and the Organization of American States requested her release. Macri said that the case was under provincial, not federal, jurisdiction. Amnesty International considers "that Milagro Sala is being criminalized for peacefully exercising her rights to freedom of expression and protest" and, along with other human rights groups, have called for the granting of precautionary measures to guarantee the liberty of Milagro Sala, along with the exercise of freedom of expression and the right to social protest in Argentina. The Supreme Court refused to hear the case, which continues in the province.

=== Death of Santiago Maldonado ===
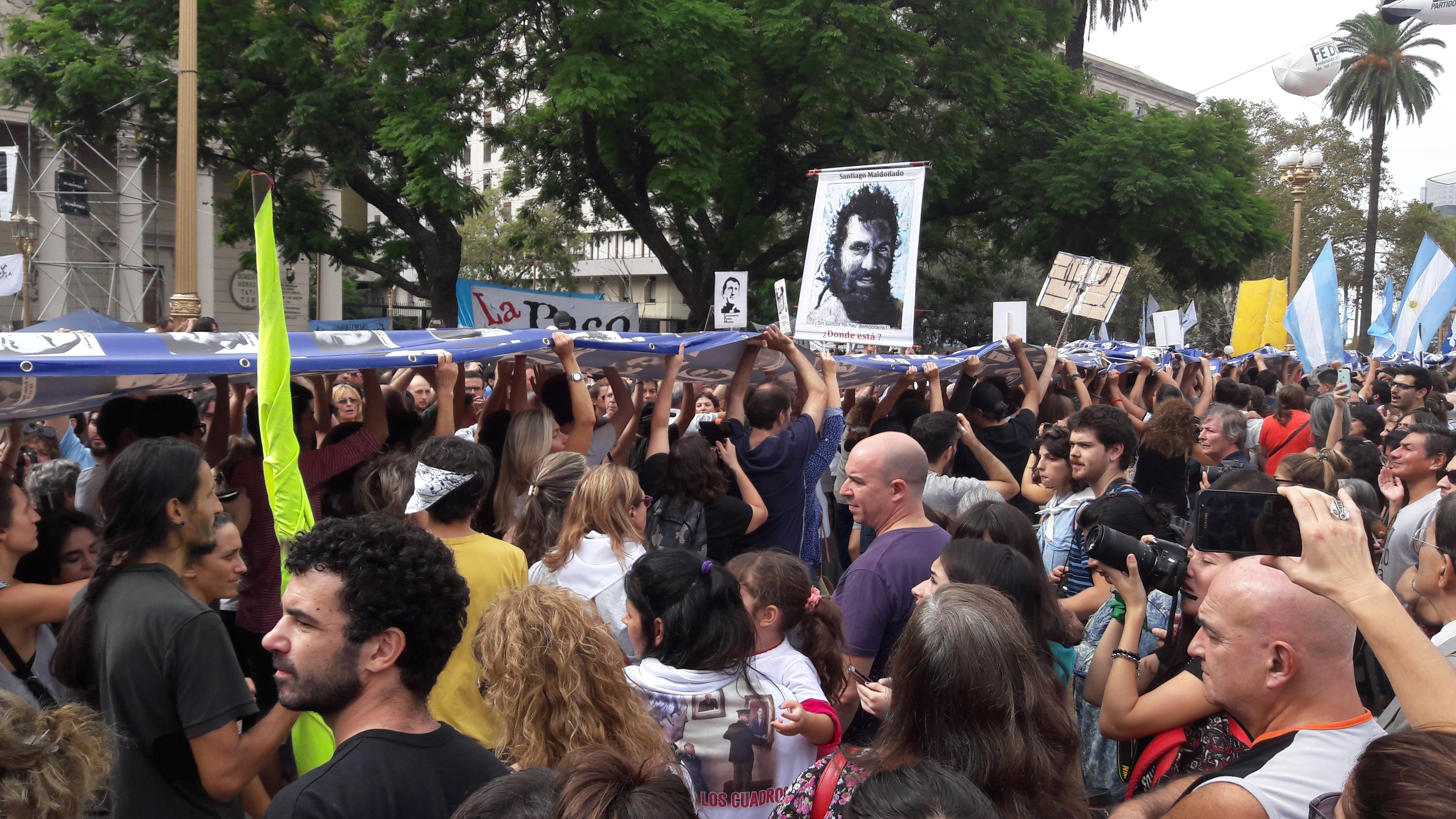
Demonstration in support of Maldonado during the Day of Remembrance for Truth and Justice.

The Benetton Group has territories at the Chubut Province, and the Mapuche indigenous people claim that those territories belonged to them. Facundo Jones Huala, from the Resistencia Ancestral Mapuche group, was jailed because of violent protests, and a group of eight people organized a picketing protest at the National Route 40, advocating for his liberation. The road was completely blocked by stones, trees and fire. Judge Guido Otranto instructed the Argentine National Gendarmerie (GNA) to clear the blockade and disperse the protesters. The protesters reacted violently, then escaped from the GNA. Some of them swam across the nearby Chubut River and others hid in the adjacent forest.

One of those protesters was Santiago Maldonado, and his whereabouts were unknown after the incident. Kirchnerist and human-rights organizations considered that Maldonado was a victim of a forced disappearance, and posited that he could be the first victim of a wider plan of political repression. Other theories were proposed during the investigation: that he escaped to Chile, that he was hiding, or that he had been murdered some days before in an unrelated crime and was never in the protest at all (the protesters wore hoods). It was also proposed that he could have drowned, but the Mapuches held control of the area and impeded access by the GNA. When the GNA did enter the area, the corpse was found in the river. An autopsy confirmed his identity, that the body had no signs of blows or injuries, and that he died by asphyxia and hypothermia. The judicial case was closed a year later, as the judge ruled that there was no forced disappearance and that there was no further evidence pointing towards anything other than an accidental drowning.

Arms of Mauricio Macri as member of the Order of Isabella the Catholic

=== ARA San Juan ===
On 15 November 2017, the submarine ARA San Juan (S-42) went missing. There were several irregularities both in the search process and in the communication with the families of those affected by the accident. The families started a judiciary process to establish the chain of responsibilities in the process. In a recent hearing, one of the accused stated that the government knew the location of the submarine and found it in 5 December 2017, but kept the finding secret until a year after, when on 16 November 2018, was communicated that the submarine was found.

=== 2019 Bolivian political crisis ===
During the last days of his tenure as President, allegations of electoral fraud and subsequent protests occurred in Bolivia, leading to the 2019 Bolivian political crisis. This caused President Evo Morales to resign and the military and police of Bolivia clashed with pro-Morales protesters, resulting in dozens of deaths from the engagement. The government of Macri immediately recognized the legitimacy of the interim presidency of Jeanine Áñez and denied Morales asylum and also blocked Argentine air space for Morales's airplane to fly over Argentina in the bid to escape Bolivia to seek asylum in Mexico. In July 2021, Bolivian Foreign Minister Rogelio Mayta accused the Macri's government of providing weaponry to the Bolivian security forces which engaged in the Senkata and Secaba massacres. In the report, the government of Luis Arce (who succeeded Áñez) also denounced Security Minister of Macri, Patricia Bullrich, and other officials for the conflict.

The denounciation was based on a thank you letter from aviation general Jorge Gonzalo Terceros Lara. Lara denounced that the letter was a forgery, and that he resigned on 13 November 2019, the same day the alleged letter was sent. His lawyer also pointed that anti-riot weapons would be useless for the aviation military, and would have made no sense for Lara to request them. Former chancellor Karen Longaric pointed as well that if the shipment arrived in Bolivia the same day that Añez became president, it would have had to be prepared and sent while Morales was still president. Longaric also pointed that, regardless of the wording, the letter does not mention war weapons but just police weapons, whose trade between nations in good standing is regular and non-controversial.

== Personal life ==
His first wife was Ivonne Bordeu, daughter of race-car driver Juan Manuel Bordeu. After they divorced, Macri married model Isabel Menditeguy in 1994; Macri's father Franco requested a prenuptial agreement. Although the marriage reached a crisis when Macri became chairman of Boca Juniors, they did not divorce until 2005. He began a romance with María Laura Groba which did not lead to marriage. Macri left Groba in 2010, after which he began a relationship with businesswoman Juliana Awada and married Awada that year, separating in 2025. At the wedding reception, he wore a fake moustache as part of his impersonation of singer Freddie Mercury. Macri accidentally swallowed the moustache, and Minister of Health Jorge Lemus performed first aid to save his life. He is a very good bridge player and represented Argentina at the 45th World Bridge Team Championships in 2022.

== Electoral history ==
=== Executive ===
Electoral history of Mauricio Macri
Election	Office	List	Votes			Result	Ref.
Election	Office	List	Total	%	P.	Result	Ref.
2003 1-R	Chief of Government of Buenos Aires	Commitment to Change	660,748	37.55%	2nd	→ Round 2	
2003 2-R	Chief of Government of Buenos Aires	Commitment to Change	807,385	46.52%	2nd	Not elected	
2007 1-R	Chief of Government of Buenos Aires	Republican Proposal	798,292	45.76%	1st	→ Round 2	
2007 2-R	Chief of Government of Buenos Aires	Republican Proposal	1,007,729	60.94%	1st	Elected	
2011 1-R	Chief of Government of Buenos Aires	Republican Proposal	836,608	47.07%	1st	→ Round 2	
2011 2-R	Chief of Government of Buenos Aires	Republican Proposal	1,090,389	64.27%	1st	Elected	
2015 1-R	President of Argentina	Cambiemos	8,601,131	34.15%	2nd	→ Round 2	
2015 2-R	President of Argentina	Cambiemos	12,988,349	51.34%	1st	Elected	
2019	President of Argentina	Juntos por el Cambio	10,811,586	40.28%	2nd	Not elected	

=== Legislative ===
Electoral history of Mauricio Macri
Election	Office	List	#	District	Votes			Result	Ref.
Election	Office	List	#	District	Total	%	P.	Result	Ref.
2005	National Deputy	Republican Proposal	1	City of Buenos Aires	611,178	34.09%	1st (Note: Presented on an electoral list. The data shown represents the share of the vote the entire party/alliance received in that constituency.)	Elected	

== Honours ==
=== National honours ===
- Argentina : Grand Master of the Order of the Liberator General San Martín
- Argentina : Grand Master of the Order of May

=== Foreign honours ===
- Brazil: Grand Collar of the Order of the Southern Cross, awarded by Michel Temer
  - Grand Collar of the Order of Industrial Merit of São Paulo, awarded by the Federation of Industries of the State of São Paulo
- France: Grand Cross of the Legion of Honour, awarded by François Hollande
- Italy: Grand Officer of Order of the Star of Italian Solidarity, awarded by Giorgio Napolitano
- Italy: Knight Grand Cross with Collar of the Order of Merit of the Italian Republic, awarded by Sergio Mattarella
- Japan Grand Cordon of the Order of the Chrysanthemum
- Mexico: Grand Cross of the Order of the Aztec Eagle, awarded by Enrique Peña Nieto
- Netherlands: Knight Grand Cross of the Order of the Netherlands Lion, awarded by Willem-Alexander of the Netherlands
- Norway: Grand Cross of the Order of St. Olav, awarded by King Harald V
- Spain: Knight of the Collar of the Order of Isabella the Catholic, awarded by Felipe VI of Spain

== Ancestry ==
Ancestors of Mauricio Macri

4. Giorgio Macri; Polistena, Calabria, Italy
2. Franco Macri; Rome, Italy
20. Augusto Garbini; Italy
10. Galileo Garbini; Italy
21. Giuseppa Rocchini; Italy
5. Lea Lidia Garbini; Lazio, Italy
11. Erminia Sensini; Italy
1. Mauricio Macri; Tandil, Argentina
24. José Blanco; Spain
12. Manuel Blanco Suárez; Spain
25. Josefa Suárez; Spain
6. Debilio Blanco Villegas; Ramallo, Buenos Aires
26. Casiano Villegas; Spain
13. Adela Villegas; San Nicolás de los Arroyos, Buenos Aires
27. Juana Leandra Centurión; Villeta, Paraguay
3. Alicia Blanco Villegas; Buenos Aires, Argentina
28. Vincenzo Cinque; Italy
14. Antonio Cinque; Italy
29. Candida Castellucci; Italy
7. Argentina Cinque
30. Leonardo Barletta; Italy
15. Giuseppa Barletta; Italy
31. Carmen Filomeno; Italy

== Bibliography ==
- (several authors) (November 2015). Todo Macri: vida, poder y secretos del nuevo presidente. Argentina: Perfil.
- Novaro, Marcos (2017). El Caso Maldonado (in Spanish). Argentina: Edhasa. ISBN 978-987-628-470-7.

Political offices
Preceded by Jorge Telerman	Chief of Government of Buenos Aires; 2007–2015	Succeeded by Horacio Rodríguez Larreta
Preceded by Cristina Fernández de Kirchner	President of Argentina; 2015–2019	Succeeded by Alberto Fernández
Diplomatic posts
Preceded by Angela Merkel	Chair of the Group of 20; 2018	Succeeded by Shinzō Abe
Olympic Games
Preceded by Harald V	Person who opened the Olympic Games; 2018	Succeeded by TBD 2020
Preceded by Xi Jinping	Person who opened the Summer Youth Olympic Games; 2018	Succeeded by TBD 2022
Sporting positions
Preceded by Antonio Alegre	Chairman of Boca Juniors (1995-2007)	Succeeded by Pedro Pompilio
Preceded by Pedro Pompilio	Chairman of Boca Juniors (2008)	Succeeded by Jorge Amor Ameal
