= Daniel Angelici =

Argentine lawyer, entrepreneur and football executive

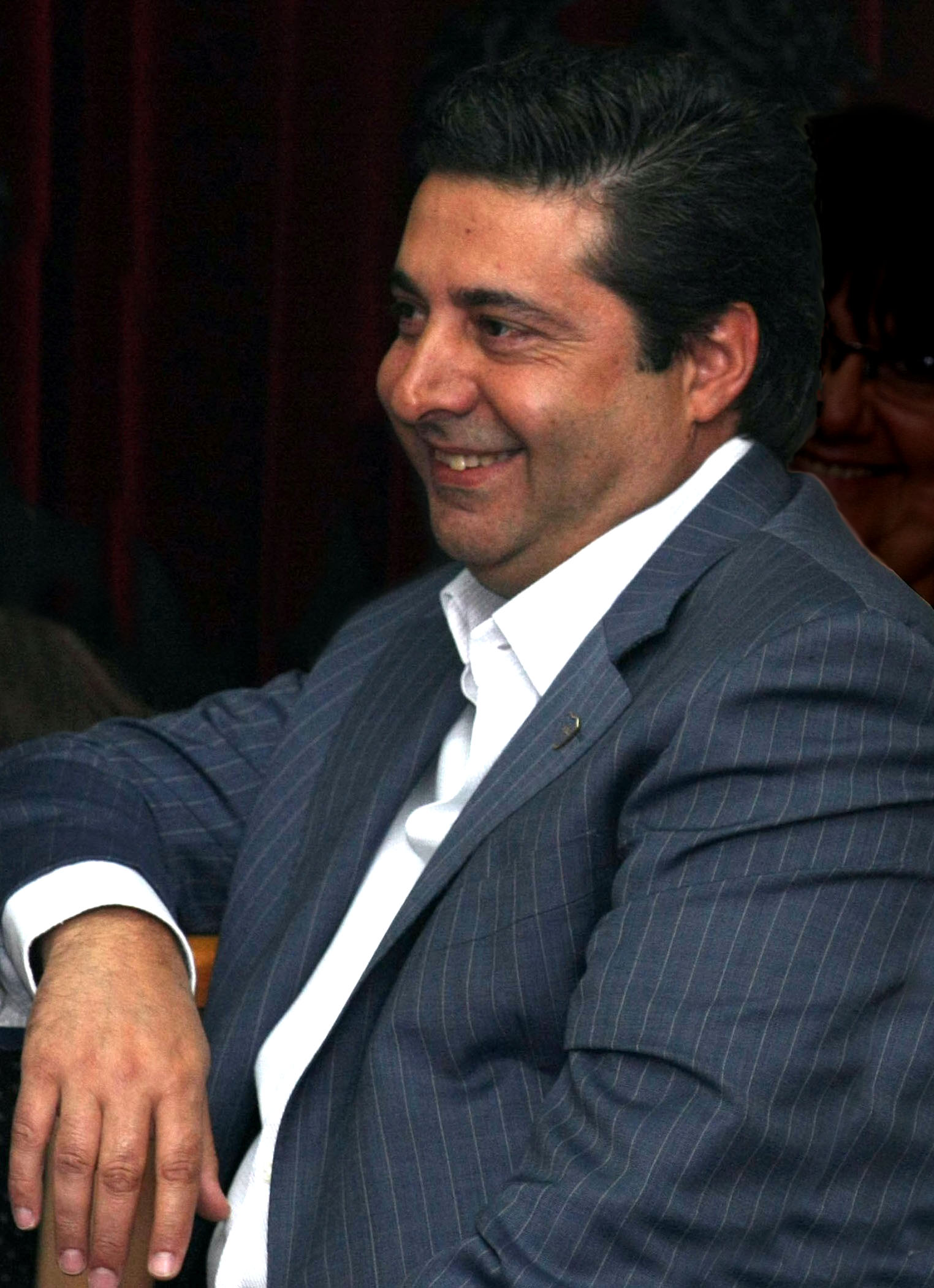
- Angelici in 2011
- Born: May 3, 1964 (age 62)
- Occupations: Football executive Entrepreneur
- Known for: President of Boca Juniors (2011–2019); Vice-President of AFA
- Political party: UCR (1982-2011); PRO (2011-present)

Daniel Angelici (born 3 May 1964 in Buenos Aires) is an Argentine lawyer, entrepreneur and football executive. He was 33° President of Boca Juniors and vice-president of the Argentine Football Association.

With the support of former president of the club, Mauricio Macri, he won the presidency of Boca Juniors on December 4, 2011, defeating then president Jorge Amor Ameal. In the elections of 2015 he was reelected with 43,78% of the votes, thus managing to continue his term until December 2019.

== Biography ==
During his youth he got involved in the Radical Civic Union at the University of Buenos Aires Law School. In recent years he has been a builder of alliances between radicals and macristas. He was pointed out of having closeness to the Judiciary, especially in the City of Buenos Aires. Angelici became one of the most important gambling entrepreneurs in Argentina, with an empire that led him to be the head of the Argentine Chamber of Bingo Halls and Annexes ("Cámara Argentina de Salas de Bingos y Anexos", abbreviated "CASBA"), with interests in five betting companies and a racehorse breeding farm.

Angelici served until 2010 as treasurer of Boca Juniors during the management of Jorge Amor Ameal. It was the focus of a controversy in 2010 when he opposed the renewal of the contract of club's idol Juan Román Riquelme, because according to him, the institution could not afford to pay a high dollar contract for four years of an elderly player. Finally, the renewal of the contract was carried out due to the great interest of the former president of the club Ameal in continuing to count on Riquelme in the team. As a result, Angelici resigned his position as treasurer of the club.

In 2011 Angelici decided to run for the presidency with the support of the then Head of Government of Buenos Aires, Mauricio Macri, winning with 54% of the votes, presenting more than 24,000 voters at the polls as a historical record. Thus, he defeated the official candidate Jorge Amor Ameal. On December 14 he assumed the new president of Boca Juniors.

On December 6, 2015, with the club having won both titles, the league championship and Copa Argentina, elections were held again at the club. After a record election for the institution, in which 26,136 members voted, Daniel Angelici managed to be reelected with 43.78% —11 421 votes—, against 30.91% of former President Jorge Amor Ameal and 25.13% of opposition candidate José Beraldi. Thus, he was in office four more years until December 2019, with Rodolfo Ferrari as vice president.

== Management ==
=== Boca Juniors ===
During his management of Boca Juniors, the registration of club members was reopened under the modality of "adherent member" (idea made by the previous management); the possibility granted to current active members to register their children under 18 as members of the club ("father and child member").

He was criticized for continuing with the position of not selling tickets for Boca Juniors supporters in the league games that the club played at La Bombonera. In that way, only members (active and a small limited number of adherent members who paid their tickets) and subscribers could attend league matches only. However, the club started selling seats for the general public in 2012 Copa Libertadores matches. In the pre-first international match of the Angelici era, against Fluminense, the cost of a ticket was set on AR$ 100, a big amount for the time.

Another issue that sparked criticism from the supporters was the excessive and annoying controls that club members must face each time the team plays at home, although Angelici has already clarified on several occasions that this situation has nothing to do with the club, but that It is by a provision of the Ministry of National Security.

On July 5, 2012, Juan Román Riquelme left the institution. As mentioned above, two years before Angelici had refused to renew the player. Finally, just 6 months after Angelici's administration as president, Riquelme decided to leave the club. Angelici then decided to take 30 days of vacation, during the pass market, returning days before the start of the next tournament.

During the 2012 Copa Sudamericana, there were incidents at the Boca stadium and a few days later a confrontation with handguns between Boca members, however Angelici refused to apply the right of admission, arguing that there was no reason to do so. Under the Angelici's administration, Boca Juniors added eight reinforcements to the football team, some brought from Europe, such as Daniel Osvaldo or Nicolás Lodeiro, although they did not last a long time in the club.
