= José Alfredo López =

Argentine footballer

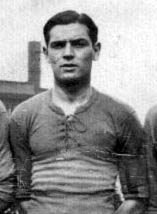

Personal information
- Date of birth: 24 January 1897
- Date of death: 10 March 1969 (aged 72)
- Position: Midfielder

Senior career*
| Years | Team | Apps | (Gls) |
| 1918–1921 | Boca Juniors | 94 | (5) |

International career
| 1918–1921 | Argentina | 9 | (0) |
- * Club domestic league appearances and goals

José Alfredo López (24 January 1897 – 10 March 1969) was an Argentine footballer who played his entire career for Boca Juniors, having played 94 official matches with the club between 1918 and 1921, winning six titles. His position on the field was right midfielder.

Apart from his tenure on Boca Juniors, López played in nine matches for the Argentina national team from 1918 to 1921. He was also part of Argentina's squad that won the 1921 Copa América, the first international title of Argentina.

López was also President of Boca Juniors in 1947, becoming the 20th chairman in the history of the club.

== Titles ==
=== Club ===
Boca Juniors

- Primera División (2): 1919, 1920
- Copa de Competencia Jockey Club (1): 1919
- Copa Ibarguren (1): 1919
- Tie Cup (1): 1919
- Copa de Honor Cousenier (1): 1920

=== Argentina ===
- Copa América (1): 1921
