= Alberto Armando =

Argentine football executive (1910–1988)

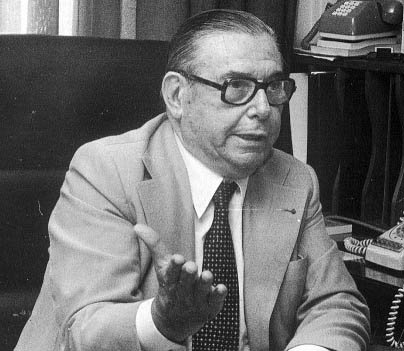
- Born: February 4, 1910; Santa Fe, Argentina
- Died: December 28, 1988 (aged 78); Buenos Aires, Argentina
- Known for: President of Boca Juniors (1954–1955, 1960–1980)

Alberto José Armando (February 4, 1910 – December 28, 1988) was an Argentine businessman and football manager. He was the president of club Boca Juniors from 1954 to 1955, and from 1960 to 1980. With Armando as president, Boca Juniors gained international recognition after winning its first Copa Libertadores (1977 and 1978) and the first Intercontinental Cup in 1977.

The Boca Juniors stadium was renamed in his honour in December 2000 by then Club President Mauricio Macri.

== Life and career ==
Armando was born in Santa Fe, Argentina, in 1910, and raised in nearby San Francisco, Córdoba. He married María Mercedes Crespo and became affiliated with the Boca Juniors football club in the 1940s, when he became known as El Puma. Armando was elected president of Boca Juniors in early 1954, succeeding Daniel Gil. The team had struggled since its last First Division title, in 1944, though Gil's tenure could boast the enlargement and modernization of the La Bombonera stadium.

Armando's brief first turn as president during 1954–55 was marked by the team's first title in a decade, the 1954 Primera División championship. However, his occupation as the proprietor of a Ford dealership prompted him to resign. He diversified his business interests in 1960, when he entered into a partnership with developer Francisco Macri to establish Tutora Insurance.

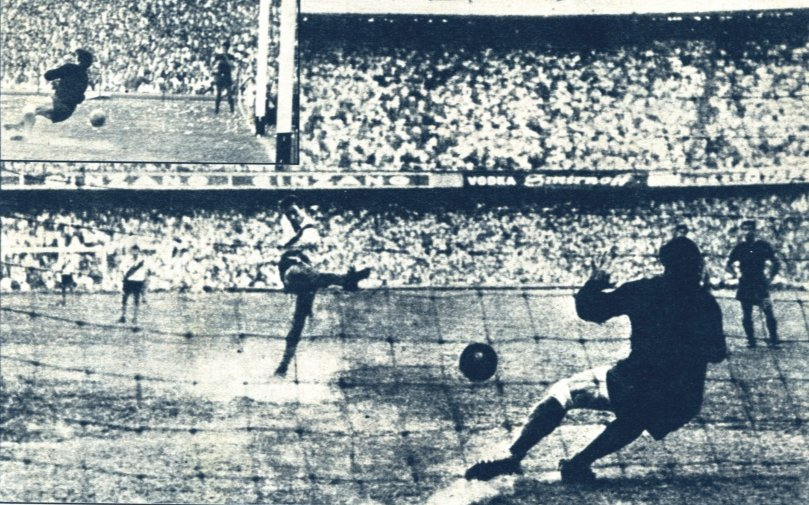
One of Armando's first drafts, goalkeeper Antonio Roma, deflects a River Plate goal in 1962, resulting in Boca's first championship in eight years.

Later in 1960, Armando won the election and returned as president of Boca Juniors. He undertook an ambitious program of acquiring new players. Some of them would become notable footballers in the 1960s and 1970s, such as Antonio Roma, Silvio Marzolini, Ernesto Grillo, Dante Lugo, and Antonio Garabal (the latter three were Argentine expatriates brought back from European teams). The squad victory over arch-rival River Plate in 1962 was the first major title since 1954, and was followed by the 1964 and 1965, and the Nacional championships in 1969, 1970, and 1976, totalizing 7 league titles.

Armando was also the father of the Torneos de Verano, a series of short friendly pre-season tournaments held during the southern summer in Argentina every year, usually in January and February. The competition was held for the first time in 1968, with the games played at "General San martín" stadium of Mar del Plata, the biggest seaside beach resort in Argentina. Since the first edition in 1968, the Torneos de Verano have been uninterruptedly played, then being expanded to other cities of Argentina such as Córdoba, Mendoza, Rosario and Tandil among others.

Armando's administration in Boca Juniors also invested heavily in improving facilities. La Bombonera was modernized, and bucket seats were added. A 5-hectare (12-acre) property in suburban San Justo, Buenos Aires, was purchased in 1963 for use as La Candela, the team's training grounds. An aging football field was leased in Mar del Plata in 1969 for additional use during the summer months, when weather in the Buenos Aires area is least propitious for training.

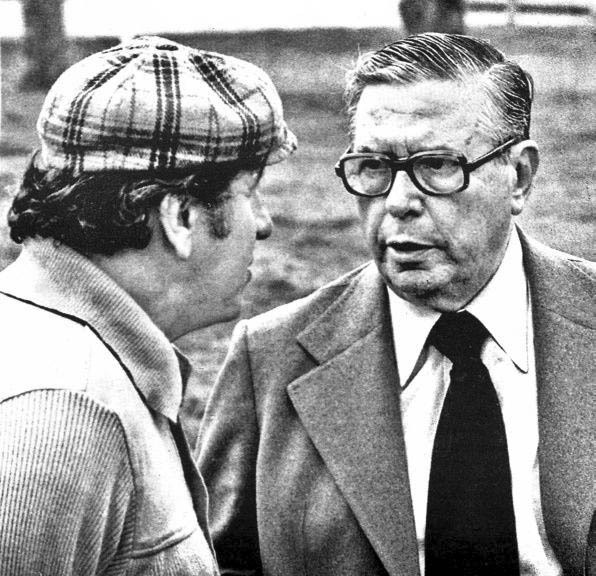
Armando (right) with manager "Toto" Lorenzo. Under his administration the club won the first international titles.

As part of the works program, Armando had a markedly ambitious project in the design and construction of a new stadium and sports complex, which was to be called the 'Ciudad Deportiva.' This project had its origins in 1962 when engineer José Luis Delpini, the designer of La Bombonera, proposed the reclaiming of land in the Río de la Plata as a site for the new complex due to the lack of available land in the city. Armando secured the support of the Argentine Congress, and in January 1965, during the presidency of Arturo Illia, a law was enacted that gave Boca Juniors the right to fill 40 hectares (99 acres) in the Río de la Plata adjacent to the Costanera Sur, between Umberto I Street and the river shore, provided that a complete sports complex, including a new stadium, was completed within ten years. The financing of this project was to be achieved through the sale of Títulos Propatrimoniales, ownership bonds, to the club's members and aficionados, which in 1965 and 1966 raised 2.5 billion pesos. The project included the design and construction of seven artificial islands connected by bridges, a stadium designed by the architect Costa and seating over 100,000 spectators, as well as swimming pools, tennis courts, an aquarium, a drive-in cinema, an amphitheater, and an amusement park named "Parque Genovés" in tribute to the Genoese immigrants who founded the club.

The development of the recreational facilities continued to advance, becoming a free public recreational site of great importance during the 1970s; nevertheless, the construction of the stadium was never realized. The hindrances, such as the presence of inflation, lack of finances, and legal issues with investors, caused the project to be delayed further. The club had over 300 creditor lawsuits filed against them by 1974. That year, Congress declared the project as of National Interest, specifically excluding the responsibility to build the stadium. Only a 2,000-seat grandstand was built on the seventh island as a structural experiment. In 1979, the de facto mayor, Osvaldo Cacciatore, officially declared the club as not meeting the requirements of the 1965 Deed, thus extending the deadline and relieving Boca from the responsibility of the construction.

These setbacks were accompanied by a dearth in new titles for the team lasting from 1971 to 1975. The hiring of Juan Carlos Lorenzo as head coach, however, helped revert the rut, and a national title in 1976 was followed by the team's first international title, the 1977 Copa Intercontinental. This was followed by Copa Libertadores de América titles in 1977 and 1978.

His successor, Martín Noel, stopped all new construction on the project, and the rapid deterioration in the team's finances after 1981 ultimately led Antonio Alegre, the team president elected in 1985, to sell the land as a means of rescuing Boca Juniors from bankruptcy. Armando, who objected to the sale, challenged Alegre in a December 1986 team election, losing narrowly; he died on December 28, 1988. The complex continued to decline until 1992, when the land was sold to the company Santa María del Plata for about $23 million, with the money going towards the construction of new facilities for the club. The complex was later approved in 2021 for a massive project for a new development project known as Ramblas del Plata after a series of disputes over regulations and laws.

Mauricio Macri, who was elected president of the club in 1995, and whose father was Armando's erstwhile business partner (Francisco Macri), renamed La Bombonera (officially known as the "Camilo Cichero" Stadium until then) in honor of former club president Alberto J. Armando.
