= Carlos Heller =

Argentine politician (born 1940)

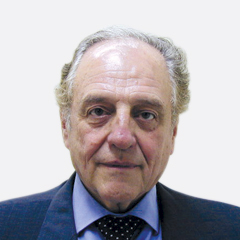

National Deputy
- Incumbent
- Assumed office 19 December 2019
- Constituency: City of Buenos Aires
- In office 10 December 2009 – 10 December 2017
- Constituency: City of Buenos Aires

Personal details
- Born: 17 October 1940 (age 85) Villa Domínguez, Entre Ríos Province, Argentina
- Party: Solidary Party (since 2007)
- Other political affiliations: Front for Victory (2007–2019); Frente de Todos (since 2019)
- Profession: Banker, politician

Carlos Salomón Heller (born 17 October 1940) is an Argentine executive, cooperative banking leader and politician, currently serving as member of the Argentine Chamber of Deputies, representing the Autonomous City of Buenos Aires, since 2019. He is the founder and president of the Solidary Party.

== Life and times ==
=== The cooperative movement ===
Carlos Heller was born in rural Villa Dominguez (near Villaguay, Entre Ríos Province), in 1940, to a Jewish family. The Hellers relocated to Buenos Aires in 1950, and Carlos completed his secondary schooling in a vocational school. He married Ether Sosa in 1962, and the couple had two children. Losing his post in an auto parts manufacturer due to layoffs, Heller was hired as an administrative assistant in one of Buenos Aires' then-numerous credit unions, in 1963; in 1974, he was named to the board of directors of the Instituto Movilizador de Fondos Cooperativos (Argentine credit unions' coordinating body).

The military dictatorship installed in 1976 brought with it an ultra-conservative Economy Minister, José Alfredo Martínez de Hoz. Following a round of wage freezes (amid 400% inflation), Martínez de Hoz further threatened community banks in February 1977 with his Financial Entities Law. The measure prohibited non-profit banking and raised minimum capital requirements to US$10 million, both of which precluded most smaller credit unions in the country at the time. This and further measures enacted by the Economy Minister in 1977 encouraged the dramatic growth of investment banking in Argentina - particularly the financing of speculation. This adversely affected credit unions further by allowing larger, commercial banks to offer depositors exotic investment vehicles with high yields. As credit unions closed, Heller and other leaders in the sector met in a Villa Ortúzar co-op in 1978 to discuss the creation of a unified credit union; in November, they petitioned the Central Bank of Argentina to charter Banco Credicoop. Receiving the Central Bank's charter in February 1979, the new institution named Carlos Heller its first General Manager.

Even as community banks closed, unregulated investment banks proliferated in Argentina during the late 1970s; the practice collapsed between 1980 and 1982, however, and hundreds of these unregulated financial houses, as well as numerous banks, closed.

=== Tenure at Boca Juniors football club ===
Antonio Alegre invited Heller to run with him for the vice-presidency of the Boca Juniors football team, one of Argentina's (and the world's) most prominent. Elected in 1985, Alegre and Heller inherited a financially insolvent football club and a stadium unable to meet municipal safety requirements. Selling land near Buenos Aires' waterfront for US$21 million, they were able to recover the club's finances and refurbish the iconic Bombonera stadium. The duo was narrowly defeated for re-election by Mauricio Macri, in December 1995. Heller has been nominated numerous times for the presidency of the Argentine Football Association (AFA), though his prospective candidacy has been reportedly opposed by the AFA's longtime head, Julio Grondona.

=== Politics ===
Long a socialist, Heller publicly entered the fractious realm of Argentine politics in 2004, when he joined the Rosario Group, a left-leaning advocacy group. Heller formed the Solidary Party ahead of the 2007 elections in Buenos Aires, obtaining the support of Congressman Miguel Bonasso and former Buenos Aires Mayor Aníbal Ibarra, who had been impeached a year earlier over accusations of negligence in a tragic New Year's Eve 2004 nightclub fire. Heller was Daniel Filmus' running mate for the post of Mayor of Buenos Aires. A close ally of President Néstor Kirchner, Filmus proceeded to a runoff election; but he and Heller were amply defeated by the center-right Republican Proposal candidate, Mauricio Macri.

For the Argentine legislative elections of 2009 Heller became a candidate for a seat at the lower chamber for the City of Buenos Aires. His candidacy was on top of the joint ticket of his own Solidary Party (PSOL) and the Kirchnerist Front for Victory. In one of the most important and competitive electoral districts of Argentina, Heller secured a seat in Congress obtaining 12% of the vote, its ticket placed fourth.
