= Banco Credicoop =

Argentinian cooperatively-owned bank

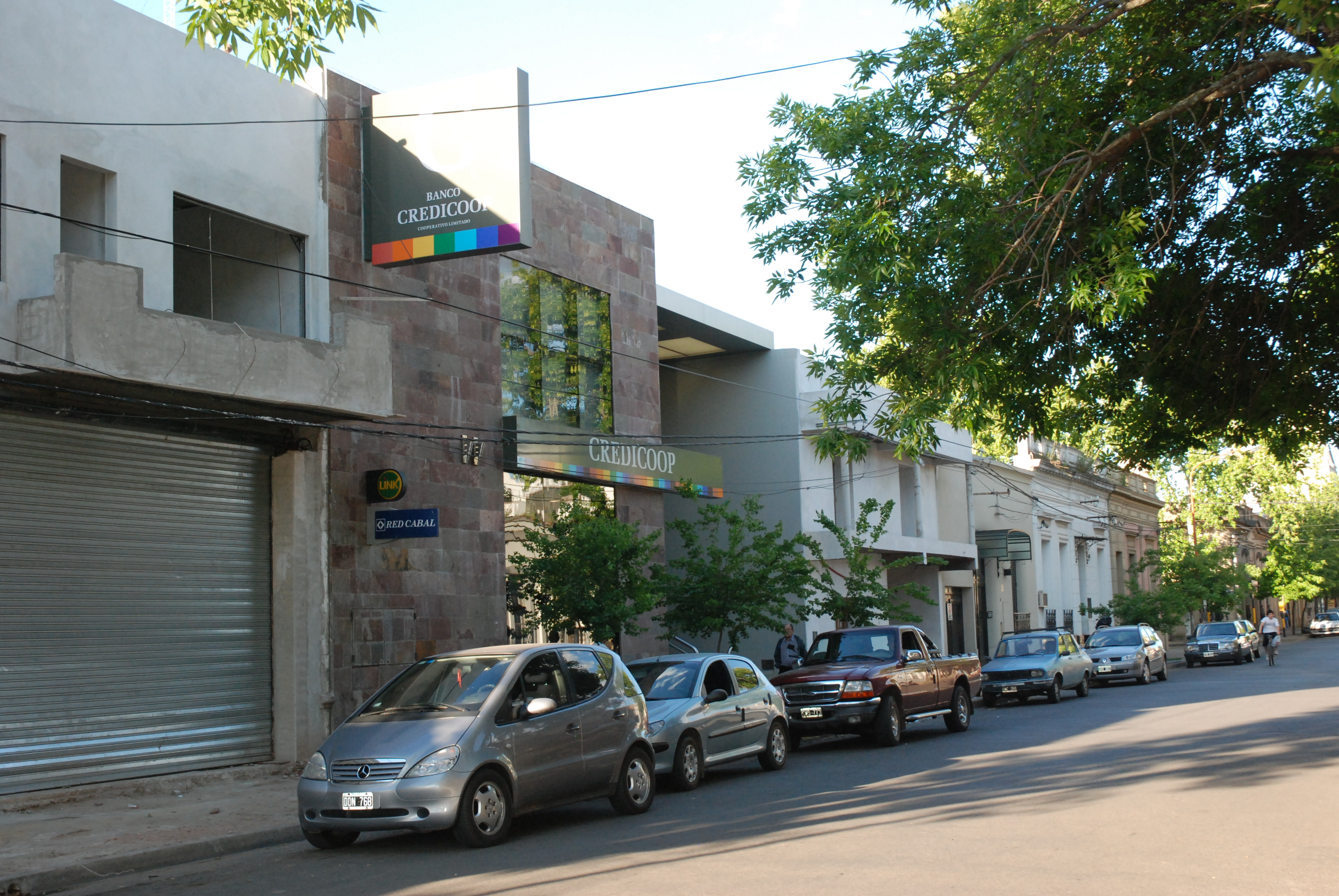
- Type: Credit union
- Industry: Banking (cooperative); Insurance; Pension funds
- Founded: Buenos Aires, Argentina (March 19, 1979)
- Headquarters: Buenos Aires
- Key people: Carlos Heller, President; Ricardo Sapei, 1st Vice-Pres; Horacio José Giura, 2ndVice-Pres.
- Products: Retail Banking; Insurance; Investments; Accounting & Payroll; Mortgages; Consumer Finance; Credit cards
- Revenue: ▲US$416 million (2008) US$273 million (2008)
- Net income: ▲US$37.5 million (2008)
- Total assets: ▲US$3.1 billion (2008)
- Total equity: ▲US$269 million (2008)
- Number of employees: 5,000 (2014)
- Website: www.bancocredicoop.coop

Banco Credicoop is the largest cooperatively-owned bank in Argentina.

== Overview ==
Banco Credicoop was established in 1979 through the merger of 44 Argentine credit unions. This was motivated largely by the adverse effect Economy Minister José Alfredo Martínez de Hoz's Financial Entities Law of 1977 had on this sector. The policy encouraged commercial banks in Argentina to offer high-yield, exotic investments by extending the Central Bank's guarantee to losses accrued from these financial vehicles. This practice collapsed between 1980 and 1982, however, and hundreds of unregulated, non-banking financial institutions, as well as numerous banks, closed. Today, Banco Credicoop is Argentina's eleventh-largest bank by total assets and ninth-largest by deposits (US$2.8 billion); Nearly all of this is accounted for by its over 670,000 members, and Credicoop maintains 244 branches.

The institution is organized as a credit union, and operates as a non-profit cooperative. Each member is given one vote at all shareholder meetings, and the top ten depositors account for less than 10% of deposits. It is also a lender in a country where domestic credit is difficult to access, holding a net loan portfolio of nearly US$1.7 billion (3.5% of the domestic total). Loans to small and medium businesses accounted for 70% of this, and the credit union holds 5% of the nation's domestic loans to this sector. The credit union provides personal and business financial and accounting services; since 1980, it has issued Cabal, the only cooperatively-managed credit card in Argentina. The group also manages the Previsol Pension Fund and numerous insurers. Credicoop is a standing member of the International Co-operative Alliance.
