= Pedro Pompilio =

Football businessman and chairman of Boca Juniors

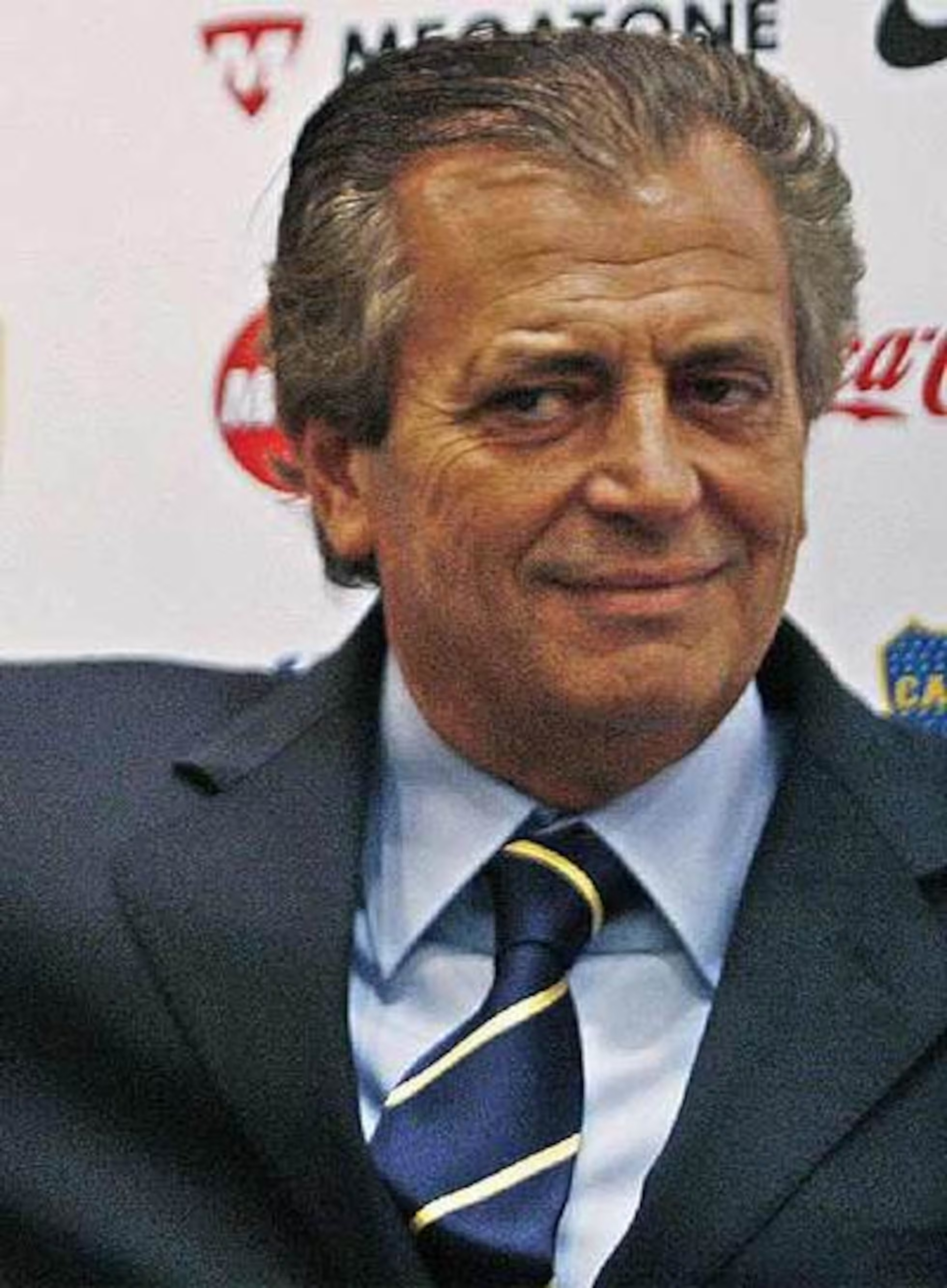
- Born: November 11, 1950; Bernal, Argentina
- Died: 30 October 2008 (aged 57); Buenos Aires
- Occupation: Businessman
- Known for: Vice-President of Boca Juniors (1995-2007) and later president (2008)

Pedro Pompilio (11 November 1950 in Bernal, Argentina — 30 October 2008 in Buenos Aires) was a football businessman and chairman of Boca Juniors. He began his mandate at the club on 4 December 2007 and it lasted until his death on 30 October 2008 due to heart problems. He was also the second Vice President of the Argentinian Football Association (Asociación del Fútbol Argentino).
