= Presidency of Mauricio Macri =

Argentine presidency from 2015 to 2019

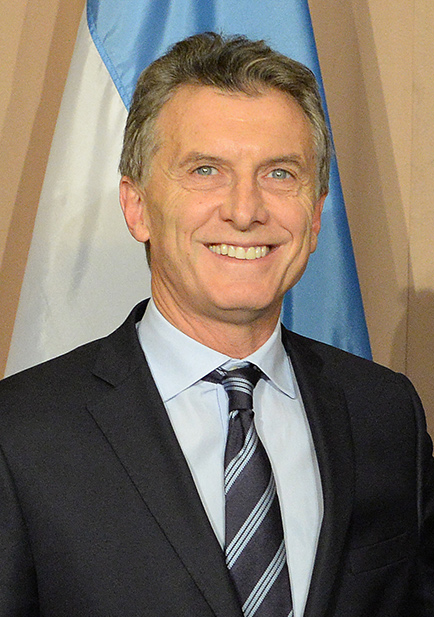
- Presidency of Mauricio Macri; 10 December 2015 – 10 December 2019
- President: Mauricio Macri
- Vice President: Gabriela Michetti
- Party: Republican Proposal; Juntos por el Cambio
- Election: 2015
- Seat: Casa Rosada
- Standard of the President

Mauricio Macri's tenure as the president of Argentina began on 10 December 2015, and ended on 10 December 2019. Macri, a member of the Republican Proposal, took office after defeating the Justicialist candidate, Daniel Scioli, in the 2015 general election. He is Argentina's first democratically elected non-Radical or Peronist president since 1916. Macri unsuccessfully sought re-election in the 2019 general election, losing to Alberto Fernández and becoming the first incumbent president in Argentina and South America's history to be unseated by a challenger and not reach a second term.

== President-elect ==
He promised to reduce inflation, improve conditions for business, and cease the international alignment with Venezuela and Iran. Macri has announced an infrastructure development strategy named Plan Belgrano (after Manuel Belgrano), a plan aimed at building infrastructure and encouraging industry development in ten of Argentina's northern provinces, which have historically lagged behind the rest of the country in these areas. The plan includes a proposed investment of equivalent to 16 billion United States dollars over the course of 10 years, along with an "historical reconstruction fund" of 50 billion pesos to be used in 4 years. Other objectives of the plan include the provision of housing for some 250,000 families, and the construction of 1400 child care centers.

Macri announced the full composition of his cabinet on 25 November 2015, some two weeks before he was due to take office.

=== Inauguration ===
Macri took office on 10 December 2015. He began the ceremony starting from his apartment in the neighborhood of Recoleta at the corner of Avenida del Libertador and Cavia at 11:00 pm to the National Congress of Argentina with his wife Juliana Awada and his youngest daughter of 4 years old, through the Casa Rosada and the Plaza de Mayo. At 11:41 he entered the room where the Legislature was, taking an oath after the Vice President Gabriela Michetti. Then he delivered a speech of 27 minutes in which he pledged his "support for an independent judiciary, fight corruption and drug trafficking, the internal union of Argentina, universal social protection, create a 21st-century style of education and that everyone can have a roof, water and sewer". Also greeted his competitors during the presidential elections.

Later he went to the Casa Rosada, where he received the presidential attributes in the White Hall of the hands of the Temporary President of the Senate, Federico Pinedo, accompanied by Vice President Gabriela Michetti, president of the Chamber of Deputies Emilio Monzó and President of the Supreme Court Ricardo Lorenzetti. Minutes later came the historic balcony where thousands of people waited in the Plaza de Mayo, expressing his hope that "the Argentines can live better, starting a wonderful time for our country, always telling the truth, being honest, showing the problems " and calling " the Argentines to accompany management and alerting when he mistake".

After being anointed President, he gave a reception at the San Martín Palace of Argentina Foreign Ministry to all the heads of state present: Michelle Bachelet from Chile, Horacio Cartes from Paraguay, Juan Manuel Santos from Colombia, Rafael Correa from Ecuador, Evo Morales from Bolivia, Dilma Rousseff from Brazil, and representatives of other countries attending his inauguration.

== Cabinet ==
=== Ministries ===
Ministry	Minister	Party	Start	End
Cabinet Chief	Marcos Peña	Republican Proposal	10 December 2015	10 December 2019
Minister of the Interior, Public Works and Housing	Rogelio Frigerio	MID	10 December 2015	10 December 2019
Minister of Foreign Affairs and Worship	Susana Malcorra	Radical Civic Union	10 December 2015	12 June 2017
Minister of Foreign Affairs and Worship	Jorge Faurie	Independent	12 June 2017	10 December 2019
Minister of Defense	Julio Martínez	Radical Civic Union	10 December 2015	17 July 2017
Minister of Defense	Oscar Aguad	Radical Civic Union	17 July 2017	10 December 2019
Minister of the Treasury (Note: Until 10 January 2017 known as the Ministry of the Treasury and Public Finances, as the Secretariat of Finances was granted ministerial status.)	Alfonso Prat-Gay	Civic Coalition ARI	10 December 2015	31 December 2016
Minister of the Treasury	Nicolás Dujovne	Radical Civic Union	10 January 2017	17 August 2019
Minister of the Treasury	Hernán Lacunza	Republican Proposal	20 August 2019	10 December 2019
Minister of Finances	Luis Caputo	Republican Proposal	2 January 2017	14 June 2018
Minister of Production and Labour	Francisco Cabrera	Republican Proposal	10 December 2015	16 June 2018
Minister of Production and Labour	Dante Sica	Republican Proposal	21 June 2018	10 December 2019
Minister of Tourism	Gustavo Santos	Radical Civic Union	10 December 2015	5 September 2018
Minister of Modernization	Andrés Ibarra	Republican Proposal	10 December 2015	5 September 2018
Minister of Justice and Human Rights	Germán Garavano	Independent	10 December 2015	10 December 2019
Minister of Labour, Employment and Social Security	Jorge Triaca Jr.	Republican Proposal	10 December 2015	3 September 2018
Minister of Health	Jorge Lemus	Republican Proposal	10 December 2015	21 November 2017
Minister of Health	Adolfo Rubinstein	Radical Civic Union	21 November 2017	3 September 2018
Minister of Health and Social Development (Note: Until 5 September 2018 known as the Ministry of Social Development, until the Ministry of Health was incorporated into it as a secretariat.)	Carolina Stanley	Republican Proposal	10 December 2015	10 December 2019
Minister of Education, Culture, Science and Technology (Note: Until 5 September 2018 known as the Ministry of Education, until the ministries of Culture and of Science, Technology and Productive Development were incorporated into it as secretariats.)	Esteban Bullrich	Republican Proposal	10 December 2015	17 July 2017
Minister of Education, Culture, Science and Technology	Alejandro Finocchiaro	Republican Proposal	17 July 2017	10 December 2019
Minister of Science, Technology and Productive Innovation	Lino Barañao	Independent	10 December 2015	5 September 2018
Minister of Agriculture, Livestock, Fisheries and Food (Note: From 2015 to 2018 known as the Ministry of Agroindustry; briefly reorganized as a secretariat of the Ministry of Production from 5 September 2018 to 9 August 2019.)	Ricardo Buryaile	Radical Civic Union	10 December 2015	21 November 2017
Minister of Agriculture, Livestock, Fisheries and Food	Luis Miguel Etchevehere	Independent	21 November 2017	3 September 2018
Minister of Agriculture, Livestock, Fisheries and Food	Luis Miguel Etchevehere	Independent	2 August 2019	10 December 2019
Minister of Security	Patricia Bullrich	Republican Proposal	10 December 2015	10 December 2019
Minister of Transport	Guillermo Dietrich	Republican Proposal	10 December 2015	10 December 2019
Minister of the Environment and Sustainable Development	Sergio Bergman	Republican Proposal	10 December 2015	3 September 2018
Minister of Energy (Note: Until 21 June 2018 known as the Ministry of Mining and Energy.)	Juan José Aranguren	Independent	10 December 2015	16 June 2018
Minister of Energy	Javier Iguacel	Republican Proposal	21 June 2018	3 September 2018
Minister of Culture	Pablo Avelluto	Republican Proposal	10 December 2015	3 September 2018
Minister of Communications	Oscar Aguad	Radical Civic Union	10 December 2015	17 July 2017

=== Presidential secretariats ===
Ministry	Minister	Party	Start	End
General Secretary	Fernando de Andreis	Republican Proposal	10 December 2015	10 December 2019
Legal and Technical Secretary	Pablo Clusellas	Republican Proposal	10 December 2015	10 December 2019
Secretary of Comprehensive Policies on Drugs (Note: Until 12 January 2017 known as the Secretariat of Programming for the Prevention of Drug Addiction and the Fight against Drug Trafficking.)	Roberto Moro	Justicialist Party	10 December 2015	10 December 2019

== Domestic affairs ==
=== Economic policy ===
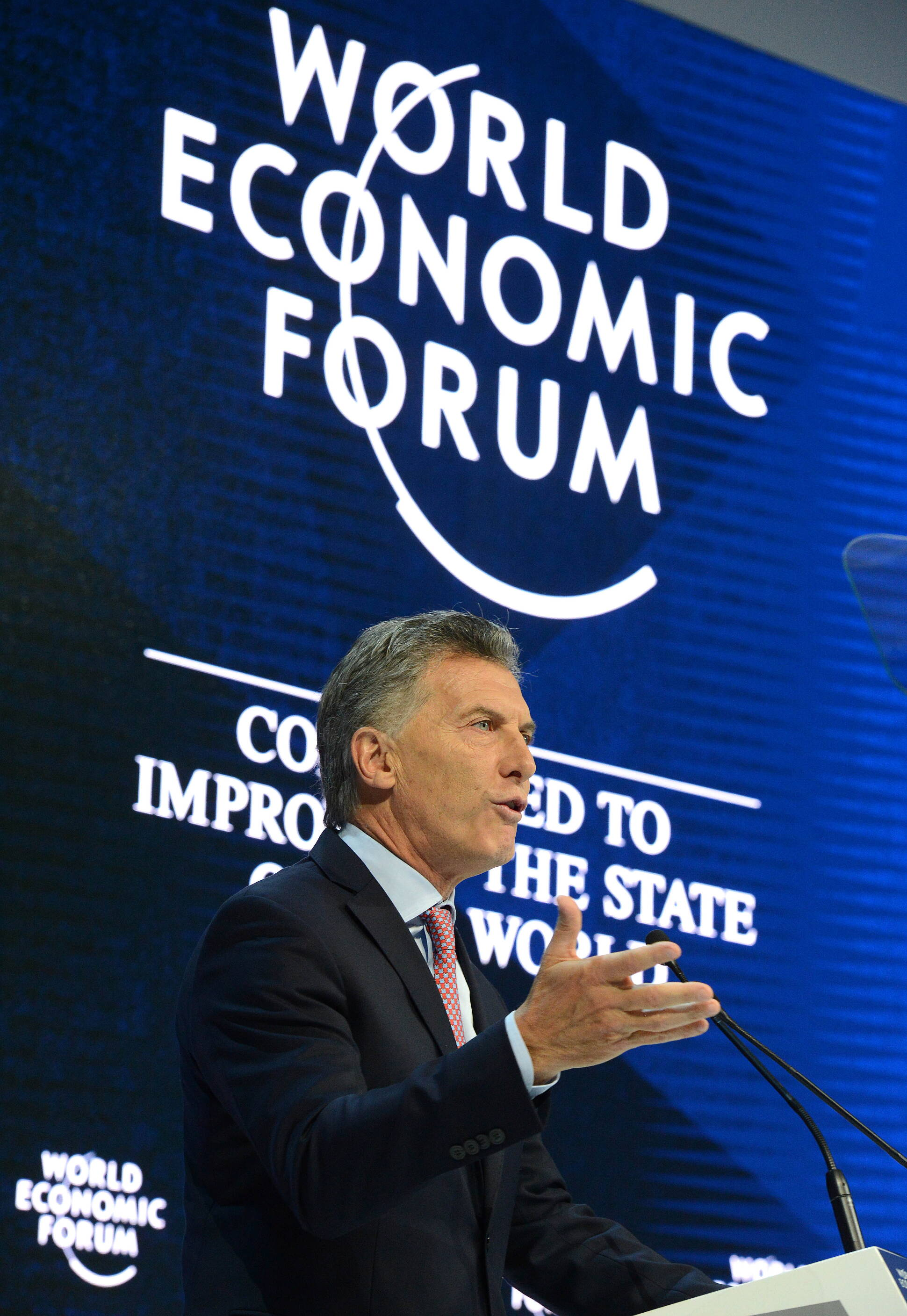
Macri at the World Economic Forum, January 2018

One of the first changes to economic policy from the Macri administration, just seven days after he had taken office, was to remove the capital controls that had been in place for four consecutive years. The move signified a 30% devaluation of the peso, and was met with both criticism and praise.

The Macri's administration eliminated export taxes on agricultural products (wheat, corn, sunflower, meat and fish), minerals (metallic and non-metallic) and certain industrial products; while it promised to lower the tariff on soy 5% every year.

For the next year, he eliminated the Advance Affidavits of Importation (an import control program) and extended Careful Pricing (a price control program) for six months.

Since 2016, Macri began the removal of energy subsidies (for electricity, gas and water) and transport subsidies (for bus, train and subway), which caused a huge increase in prices. He avoided to use a shock therapy and introduced the changes gradually.

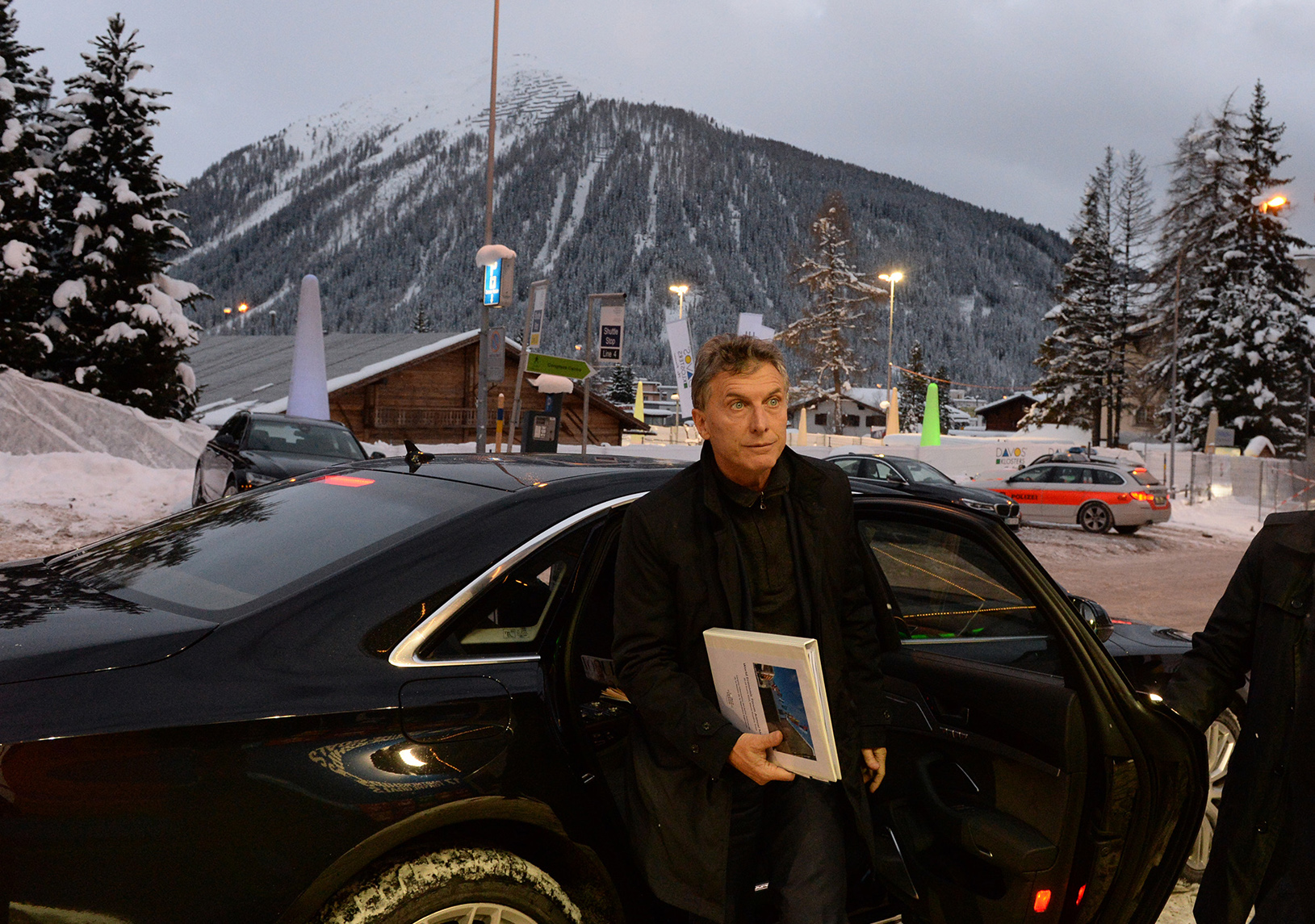
Macri looking for investments in Davos, January 2016

On 19 January, Macri attended the World Economic Forum in Davos, Switzerland with Sergio Massa and part of his cabinet looking for investments. He had meetings with various business representatives, politicians and journalists. Some of them were US Vice President Joe Biden, the Prime Minister of the United Kingdom, David Cameron, the founder of Virgin Group Richard Branson, CEO of Google Eric Schmidt, the Queen of the Netherlands, President and CEO Coca-Cola, Muhtar Kent among others. It was the first time that Argentina participates since 2003. The last president was Eduardo Duhalde.

Macri wanted to negotiate with holdouts and end the default to return to the international capital markets. Argentina faced a court hearing in New York City on 13 April. The court upheld judge Thomas P. Griesa's ruling and allowed Argentina to pay the 2005 and 2010 bondholders. The payment, made with a bond sale, was the end of the Argentine default.

One of Macri's promises during the campaign was the elimination of Income tax for workers. Macri had not fulfilled his promise, and it was not in the government's plan to eliminate the Income tax in the future either.

Political intervention in the INDEC figures ended, and the IMF declared in November 2016 that Argentine statistics were again in accordance with international standards.

Among the most notorious vulnerabilities of the administration was an extremely high inflation rate: it was 40% in 2016 (while the Central Bank expected an inflation rate of 17% for 2017, 10% for 2018 and 5% for 2019).

Other vulnerabilities included the unemployment rate close to 9%, as well as the sharp rise in the current-account deficit, which is likely to be around 3% to 4% of GDP in 2018 thanks to an over-valued currency.

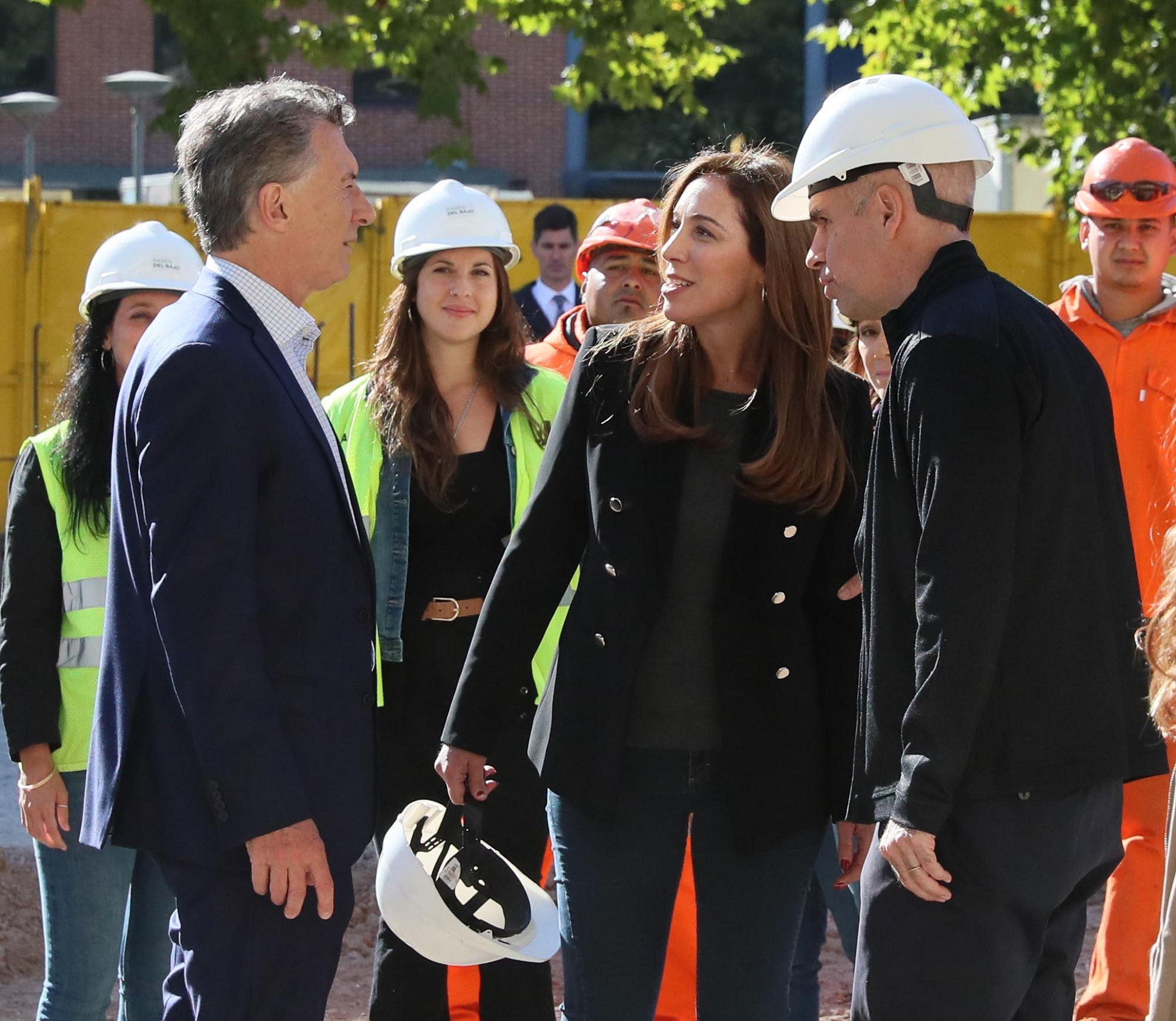
Macri inaugurating a public work with Buenos Aires Province Governor Maria Eugenia Vidal and Chief of Government of Buenos Aires Horacio Rodriguez Larreta in May 2019

Between 2017 and 2018 the government cut import tariffs on capital goods and eliminated tariffs on the importation of technology products to encourage investment.

The deregulation area allowed the incorporation of low cost airlines, such as JetSmart, Norwegian and Flybondi.

Inflation continued to be a problem, with a rate of 25% in 2017, second only to Venezuela in South America and the highest rate in the G20. On 28 December, the Central Bank of Argentina together with the Treasury announced a change of the inflation target. This was seen by the market as a relaxation of the monetary policy. They attempted to reduce it to 15%, but these efforts failed.

The international trade, which had a surplus in the previous year, gave a deficit. A drought reduced the production of soy, the country's principal export, ranking among the world's worst natural disasters in 2018.

The Federal Reserve of the United States increased interest rates from 0.25% to 1.75% and then 2%. This caused investors to return to the United States, leaving emerging markets. The effect, a raise in the price of the United States dollar, was modest in most countries, but it was felt particularly strongly in Argentina, Brazil and Turkey.

Those factors led to a monetary crisis. The interest rate increased to 60%, but could not keep the price of the US dollar.

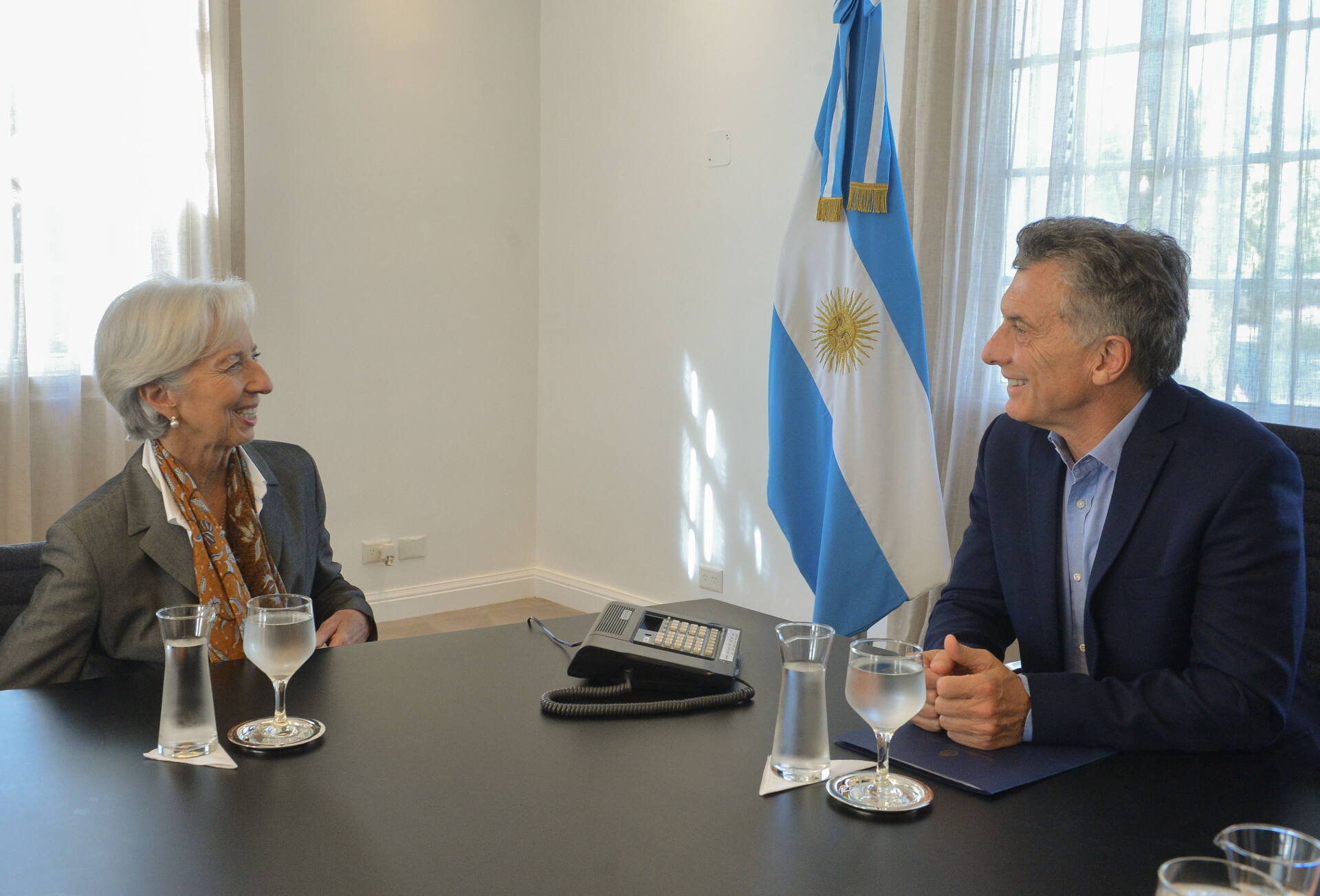
Macri negotiating the loan with Christine Lagarde, managing director of the IMF

Macri announced on 8 May that Argentina would seek a loan from the International Monetary Fund (IMF). The loan was $57bn, and the country pledged to reduce inflation and public spending.

For 2019, the government accelerated the austerity plans, with less expenses and more taxes, to completely remove the fiscal deficit.

The inflation rate was 53.8%, the highest in the country in 28 years.

The country is very different from 2015. We are better than four years ago. I know that the results of our economic reforms did not come on time.

— Mauricio Macri, five days before leaving power.

=== Human rights ===
Human rights organizations had aligned themselves with the governments of both Néstor and Cristina Kirchner, even in topics unrelated to human rights, and often worked as their spokesmen. They continued this role after 2015, when Macri defeated the Kirchnerite candidate in the presidential elections, which undermined the legitimacy of the organizations in Argentine society. Macri maintained a distant relation with those organizations, and did not seek their support, but did not openly confront them. They kept their funding and the institutions under their control, and the trials of military personnel for crimes in the Dirty War (1974–1983) continued. Nevertheless, the organizations continued their opposition to Macri. His cabinet was divided on an approach to take: whether to directly confront the organizations and remove their state financing, or to take an active role in their activities and replace their leaders with less politically motivated figures. The general policy, however, was to ignore the disputes and focus the activities of the government towards more pressing matters, such as the economy.

The government modified the public holiday for the Day of Remembrance for Truth and Justice, which makes reference to the 1976 Argentine coup d'état, to allow it to be celebrated on a movable date. This ruling was met with huge criticism. The ruling was reverted some days later, and the holiday was kept at the fixed date of 24 March.

=== Social issues ===
The #NiUnaMenos movement, which advanced a feminist agenda in Argentina since 2015, stayed strong during the Macri presidency. Macri said during the 2018 opening of the National Congress that, although he was anti-abortion, he wanted the Congress to have an abortion debate and discuss a bill for a new abortion law. As of 2018, abortion was only legally allowed for rapes and cases that may threaten the mother's health. The feminist movement organized several demonstrations in the following months, in support of the voluntary termination of pregnancy abortion bill that was proposed in Congress. The proposal, however, became highly polarizing. The country has a strong conservative catholic population, particularly in the less populated provinces, who rejected the bill. This polarization was unrelated to the political polarization of the country, and the legislators of both Cambiemos and the Justicialist Party (PJ) were divided on the vote. The bill was approved by the chamber of deputies in June, but opposition became more organized after its approval and the Senate rejected the bill, by 38 to 31 votes.

== Foreign affairs ==
During his government, Macri wants to strengthen ties with Brazil and the Southern Cone, looking away from the Bolivarian axis and claim for political prisoners in Venezuela. It will also promote the repeal of the agreement with Iran and work for a rapprochement with the United States and Europe. He has also worked to strengthen relations with Israel.

=== Americas ===
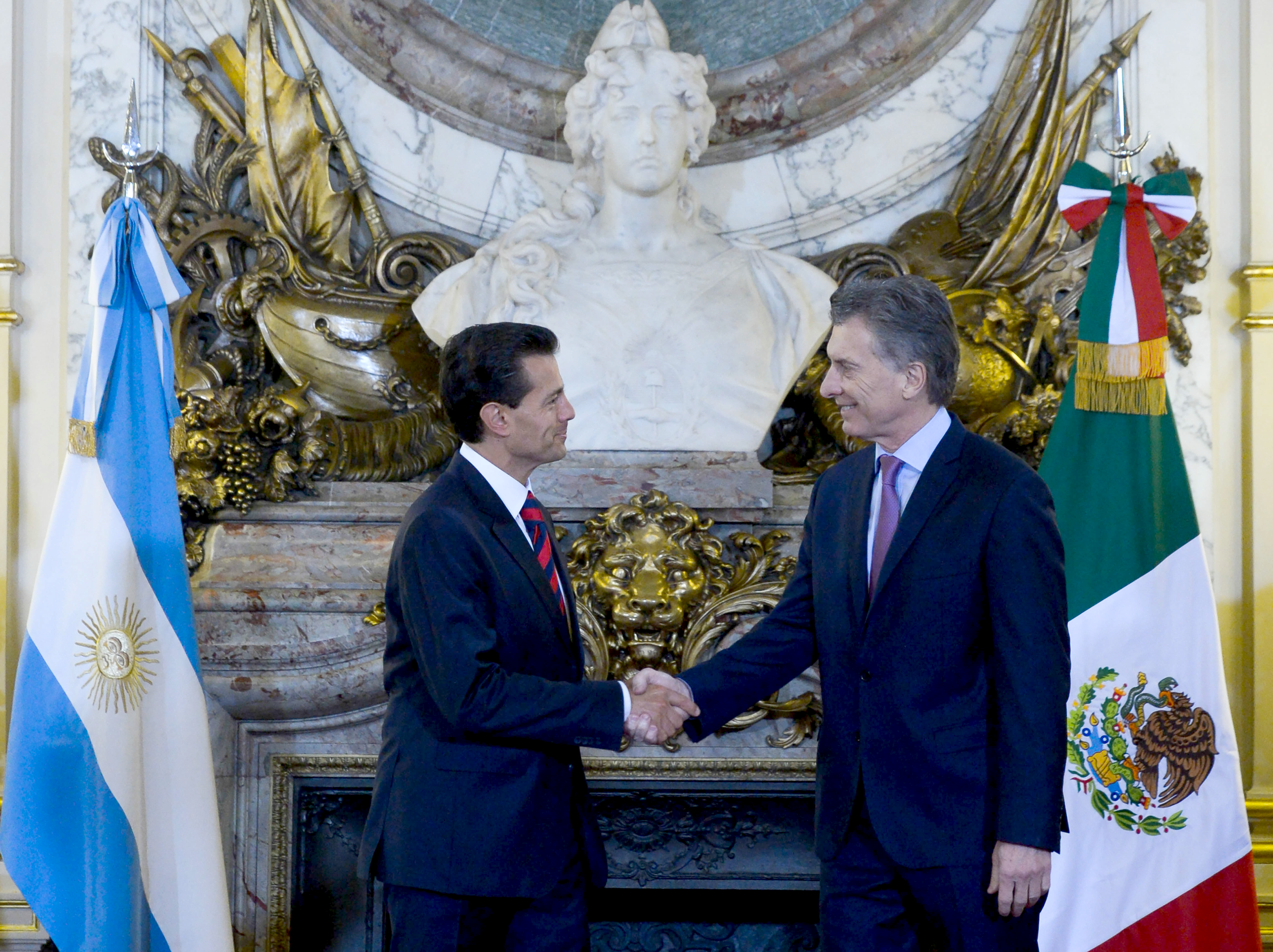
Macri with Mexican president Enrique Peña Nieto in the Casa Rosada. Argentina and Mexico, along with Brazil are the most developed economies in Latin America, and members of the G20 major economies

After being elected president, Macri received many congratulations from other Latin American presidents. Despite the ruling Workers' party having supported Daniel Scioli during the campaign, Brazilian President Dilma Rousseff congratulated Macri and invited him to a state visit "as soon as possible", while she was also set to attend Macri's inauguration as president. The pair have favored improving bilateral relations between the two countries, as well as strengthening the Mercosur trade bloc.

The Chilean President, Michelle Bachelet, contacted Macri by phone and spoke about the importance for both countries of maintaining the spirit of cooperation, integration and development which characterizes their common history and the importance of further work for Latin America.

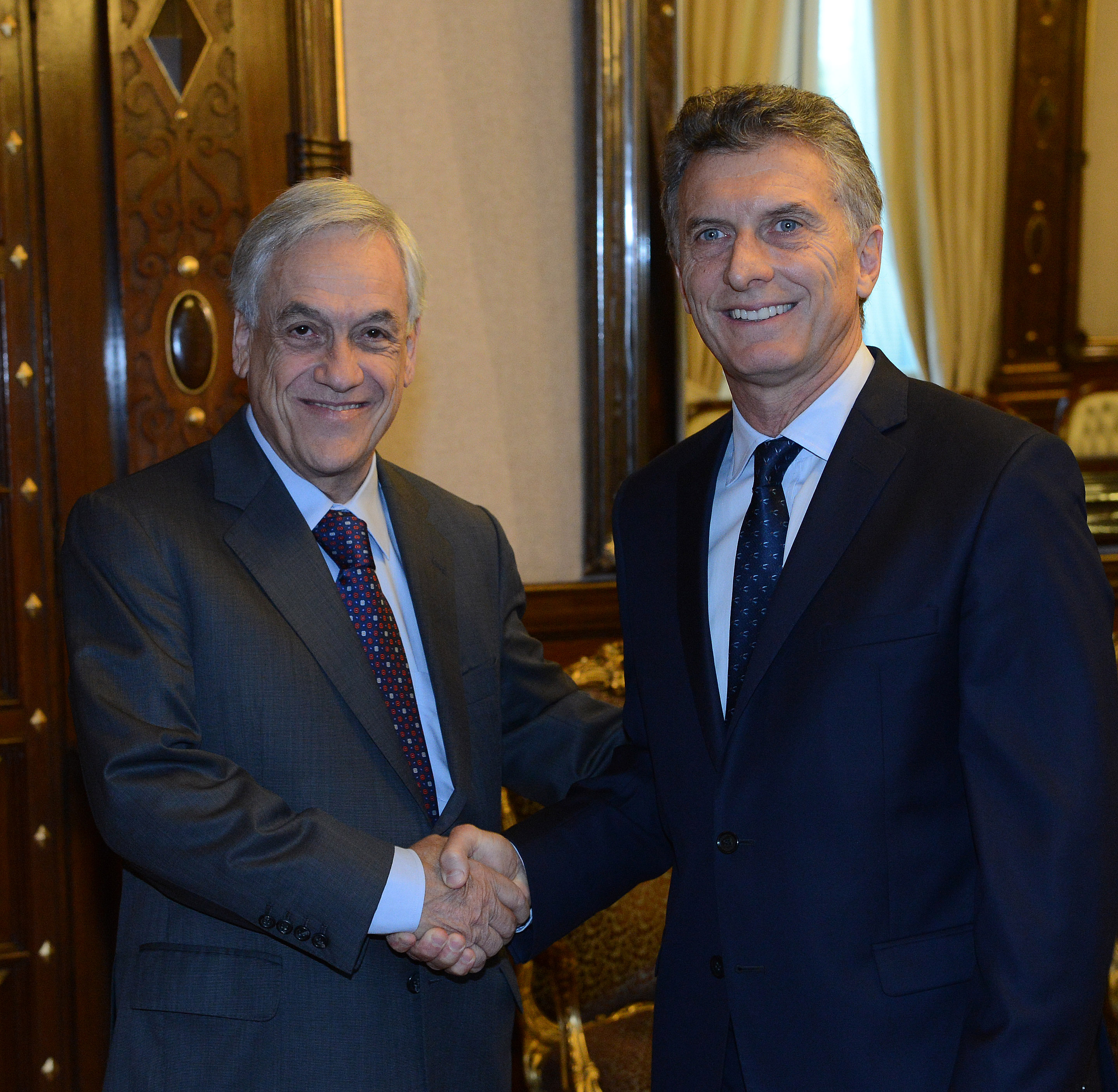
Macri with Chilean presidentSebastián Piñera (1949–2024) in 2017

Juan Manuel Santos expressed "Congratulations to Mauricio Macri for his victory in presidential elections in Argentina. Successes in his management. It has our full support".

The President of Ecuador, Rafael Correa, congratulated Macri for his victory and wished him "the best of luck".

The President of Mexico, Enrique Peña Nieto, stated that "Mexico will work with" Macri's government to strengthen "bilateral relations and the wellbeing of Latin America".

Peruvian President Ollanta Humala contacted Macri to congratulate him on his election victory and point out that the Peruvian Government has "strong will" to strengthen ties with his country, reported the Peruvian Foreign Ministry.

Uruguayan president Tabaré Vázquez greeted Macri by telephone and asked him to convey his congratulations to the people of Argentina for the civic maturity demonstrated during the election.

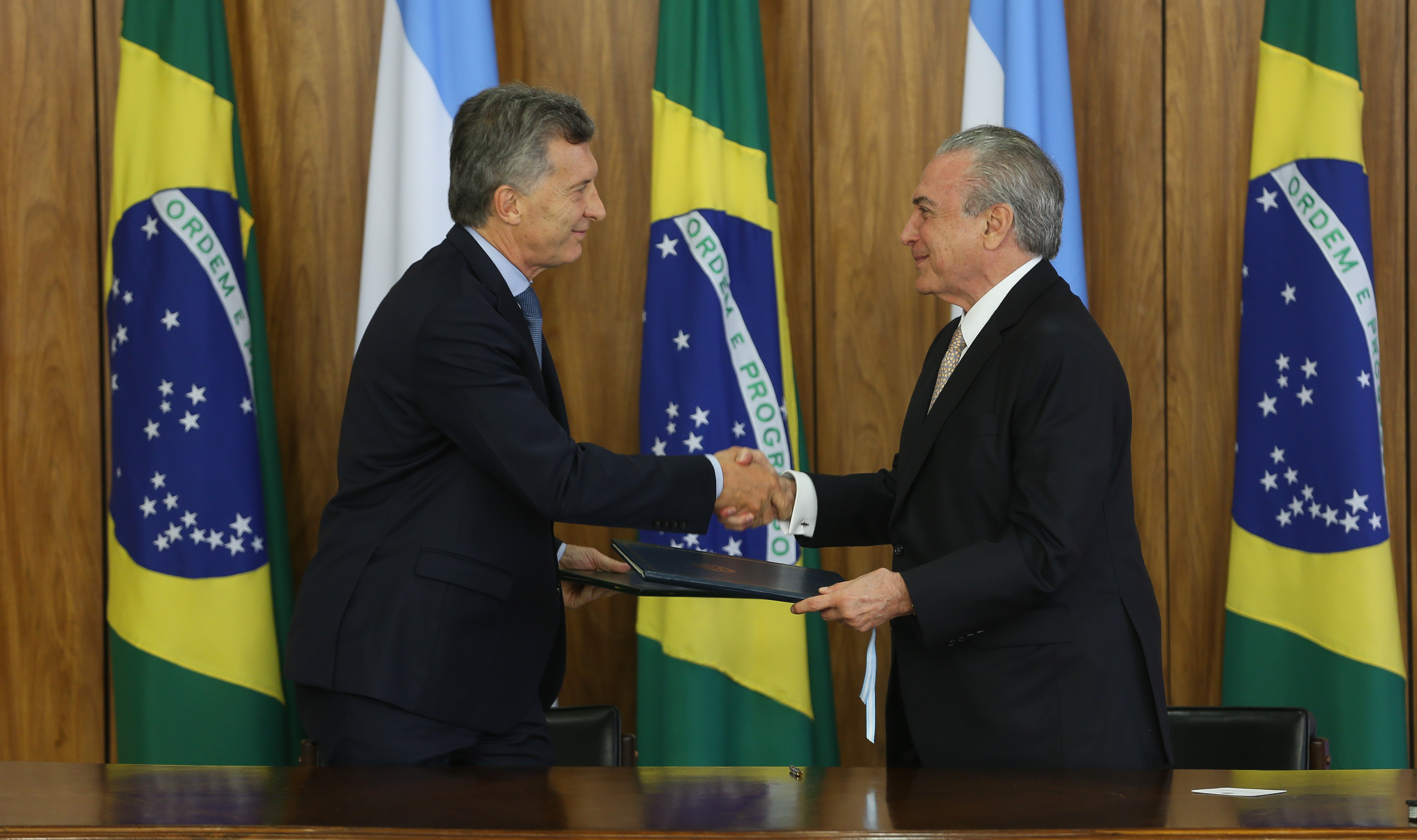
Macri with Brazilian president Michel Temer in Brasília. Brazil is Argentina's biggest trade partner.

Immediately after the elections, Macri announced that he would ask for the invocation of Mercosur's "democratic clause" (limiting membership to democracies) with regard to Venezuela, since the government of Nicolás Maduro was not respecting democratic doctrines. He called for the holding of the 2015 Venezuelan elections without electoral fraud or tricks to avoid the result, and the release of political prisoners. In the end Maduro acknowledged the defeat of his party in the elections. Nevertheless, Macri made diplomatic requests for the political prisoners in the first meeting of Mercosur that he attended. Venezuela's opposition hailed Macri's presidential win in Argentina as a blow for leftists in Latin America and a good omen for their own duel with Chavismo in the next month's parliamentary vote. "That was a big disappointment for Venezuela's ruling socialist 'Chavismo' movement, which had a close political alliance with Fernández." Diosdado Cabello called Macri a "fascist", and asked him to stay away from Venezuelan internal affairs, as Macri had proposed to remove Venezuela from the Mercosur because of the treatment to Leopoldo López and other political prisoners. The victory of Macri is considered part of the decline of the Pink Tide in the region.

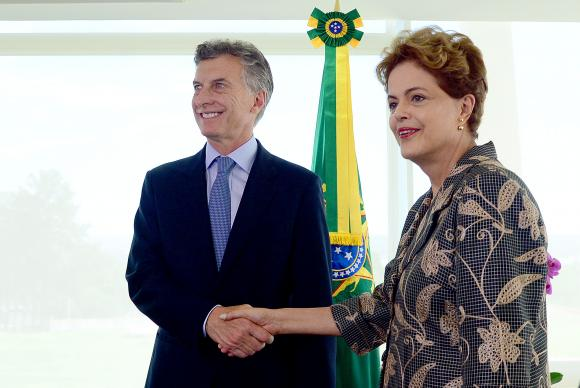
Macri and Brazilian president, Dilma Rousseff in 2015

On 5 November, Macri made his first trip as President-elect to Brazil, where he met with President Dilma Rousseff in Brasília. Macri said he chose Brazil for his first trip as President-elect because it is the main commercial partner of Argentina and because of the strong ties that both countries have. That same day, Macri traveled to Santiago de Chile, where he was received by President Michelle Bachelet in the Palacio de la Moneda.

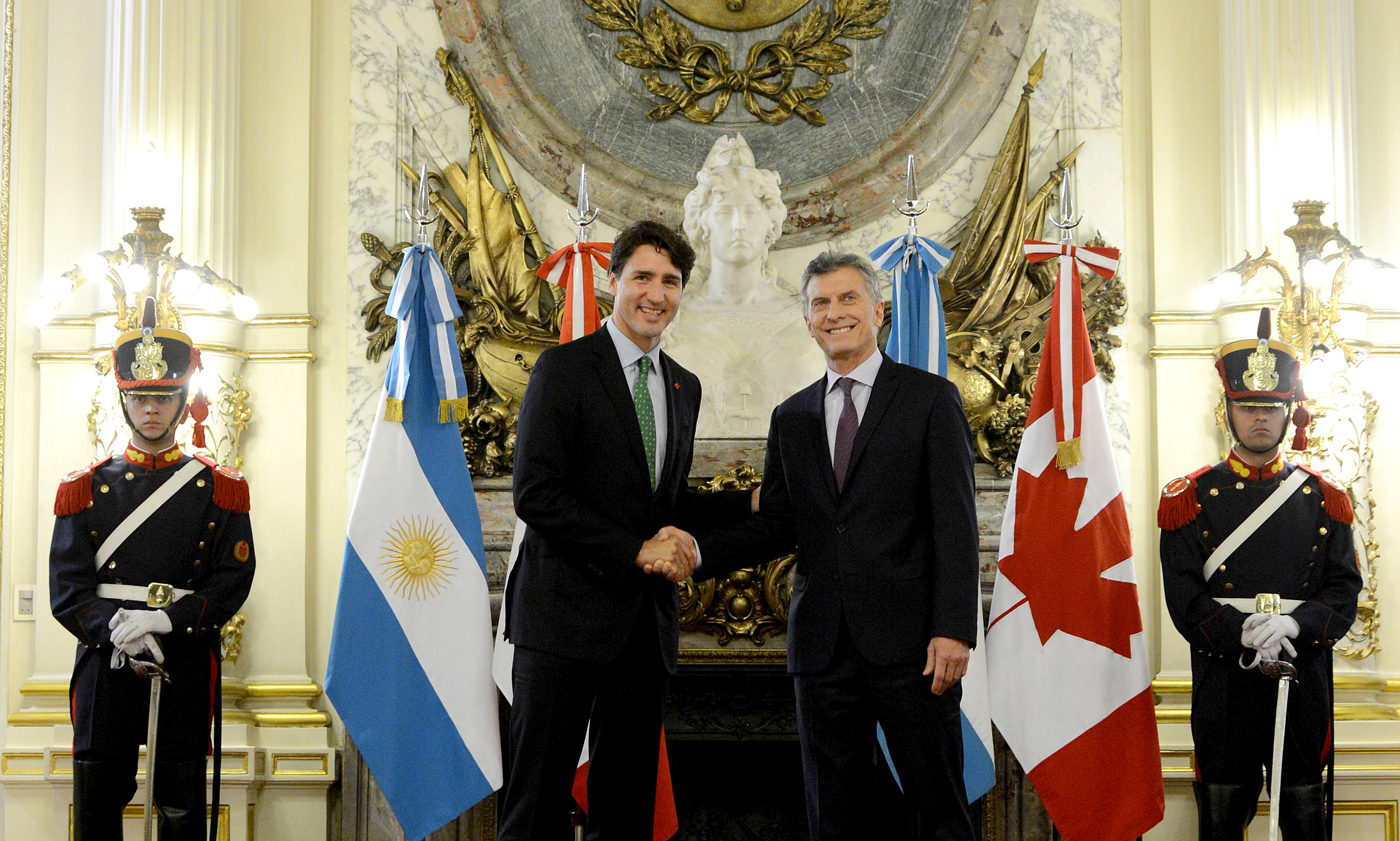
Macri with Canadian prime minister Justin Trudeau, 2016

=== United States ===
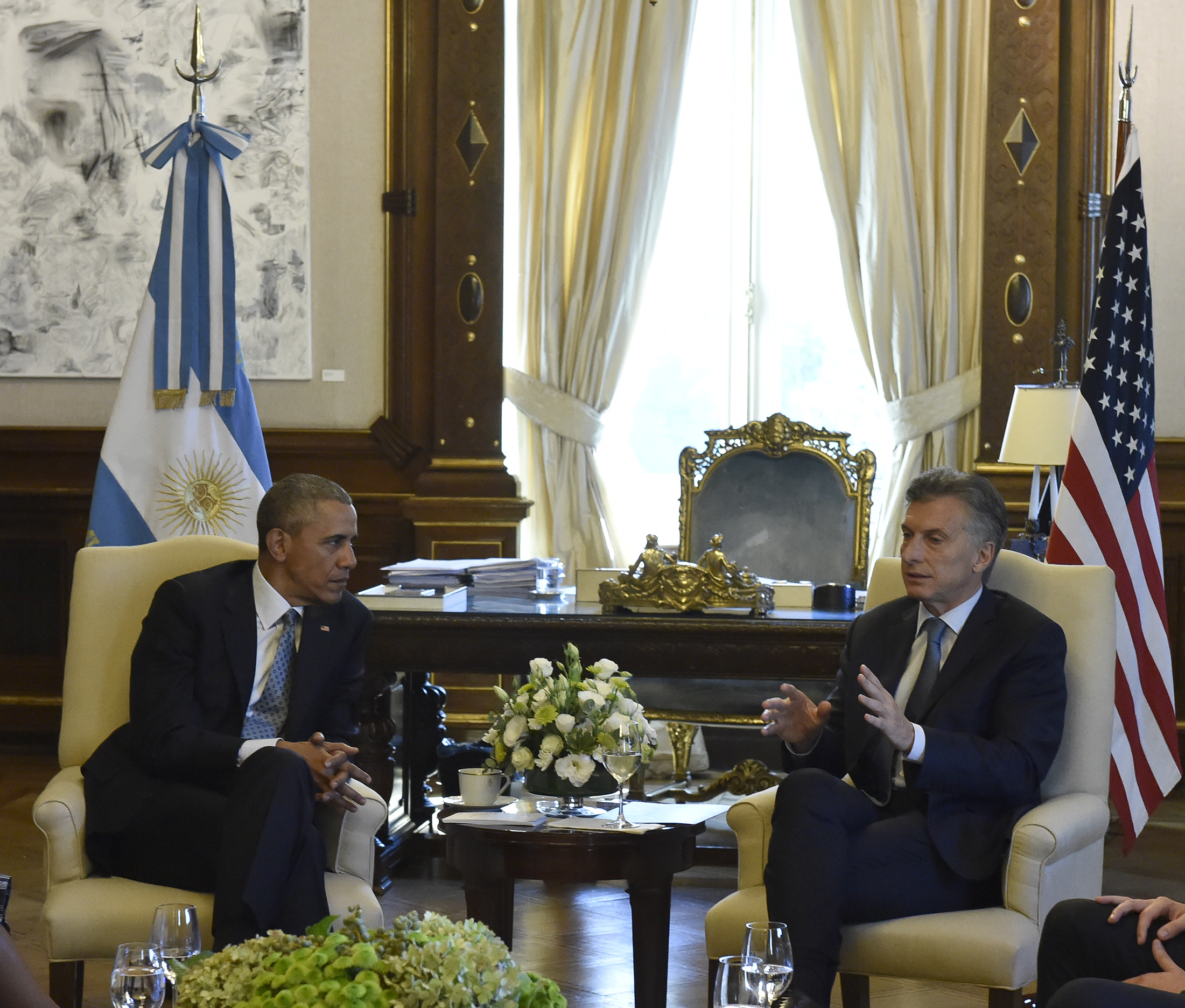
Macri and U.S. president Obama, March 2016

The United States Secretary of State John Kerry congratulated the country for its "successful elections", adding that he was "looking forward to working closely" with Macri and his government. Meanwhile, United States Ambassador to Argentina Noah Mamet wished Macri well. Members of the United States House of Representatives later asked Barack Obama in a letter to prioritise US-Argentine relations during 2016, stating that "The United States and Argentina should be natural partners. Both have highly educated populations, diversified economies and vast natural resources" and calling such a relationship a "win-win" for both countries. The letter also stressed the importance of reversing high levels of anti-Americanism in the country and resolving the holdout problem with the vulture funds, among other key issues.

Obama later congratulated Macri personally, while an official White House statement confirmed that the President intends to strengthen ties. The relations between Argentina and the United States began to twitch due to the problem that came into the Argentine Government and the vulture fund, where former President Cristina Fernández de Kirchner stated after the latter denial of certiorari that her country had an obligation to pay its creditors, but not to become the victims of extortion by speculators; even if Argentina can't use the U.S. financial system to do so, she said, teams of experts are working on ways to avoid such a default and keep Argentina's promises. The expiration of Rights Upon Future Offers in December 2014 will preclude other bondholders from suing for better terms should the Argentine Government and the vulture funds settle, making such a settlement all the more likely after that date, should the dispute continue.

On 18 February 2016, a White House official announced that President Obama would undertake a state visit to Argentina on 23–24 March 2016 to improve the Argentina–United States relations after the two countries' relations under predecessors Cristina Fernández de Kirchner and Néstor Kirchner saw tension in trade and investment. President Obama and the First Family arrived in Buenos Aires Ministro Pistarini International Airport from Havana, Cuba at around 1 a.m. (UTC−3) on Wednesday, 23 March, where they were greeted by Argentine Foreign Minister Susana Malcorra.

Obama and Macri discussed ways to strengthen cooperation in promoting "universal values and interests," such as in the areas of security, energy, health and human rights, where the two presidents have agreed for U.S. federal agencies to assist Argentina's counter-terrorism efforts, to contribute to peacekeeping missions, combat illegal drug trade and organized crime, respond to diseases and outbreaks like the Zika virus, and develop resources and renewable energy strategies. Obama also praised Macri for his economic reforms that helped create "sustainable and inclusive economic growth" and "reconnected Argentina with the world economy." Thus, Obama declared a "fresh era" of relations that would help Argentina's credibility in the Latin American region and the world, and announced trade and economic initiatives to reset the countries relations after years of tension.

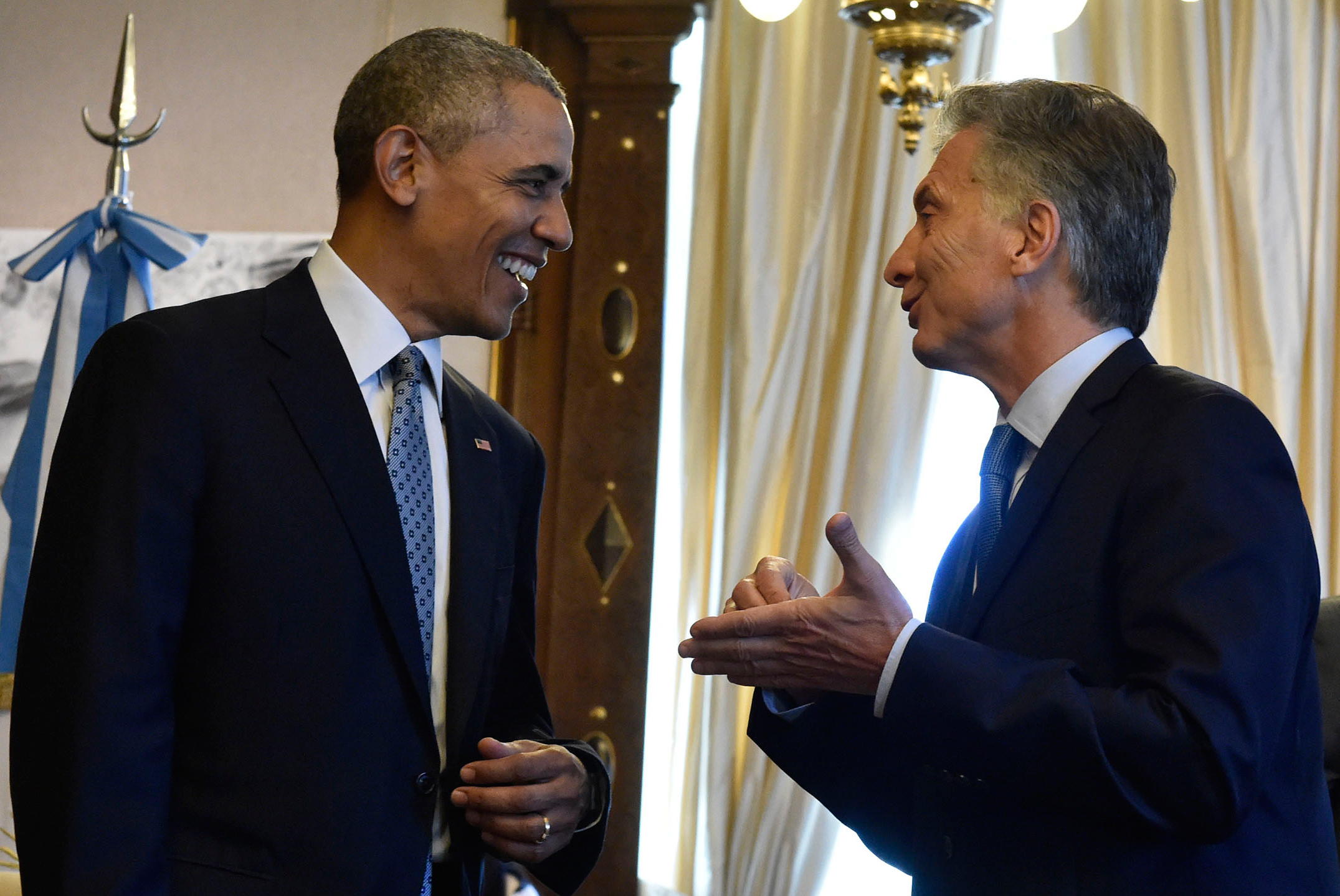
Macri and Barack Obama chatting in Buenos Aires

On 24 March 2016, Foreign Minister Susana Malcorra announced that Argentina signed agreements with the United States to join again on the Visa Waiver Program. Argentina initially joined on the program in 1996, but was removed in 2002.

Foreign Minister Susana Malcorra supported Democrat Hillary Clinton in the 2016 US presidential election, which was won by Republican Donald Trump.

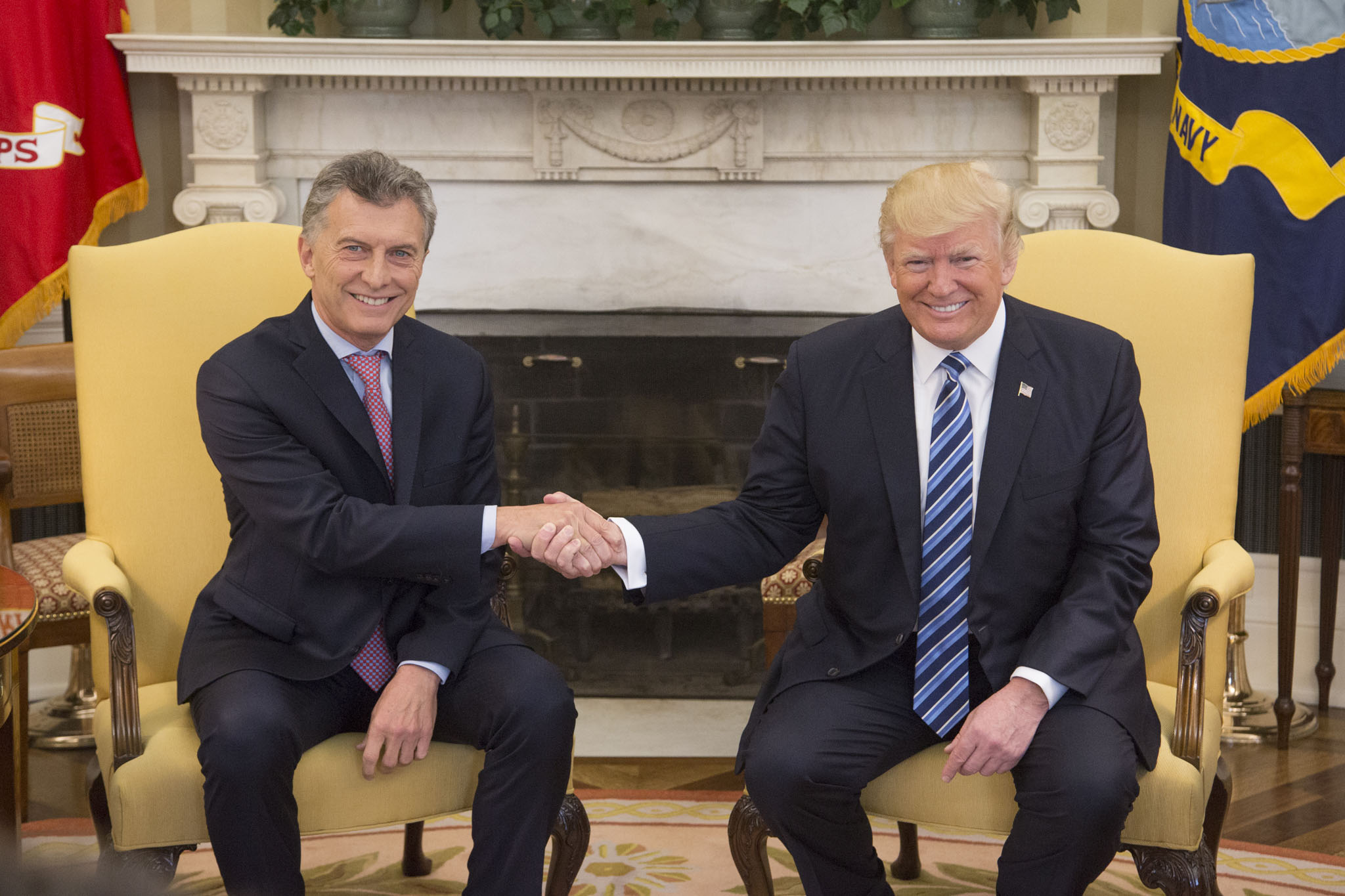
Macri and president Trump in Washington, April 2017

Macri forged diplomatic relations with Trump and brought in measures likened to Trump's border policies, including tightening control of immigration, limiting the entry of convicted criminals and facilitating the deportation of foreigners who commit crimes.

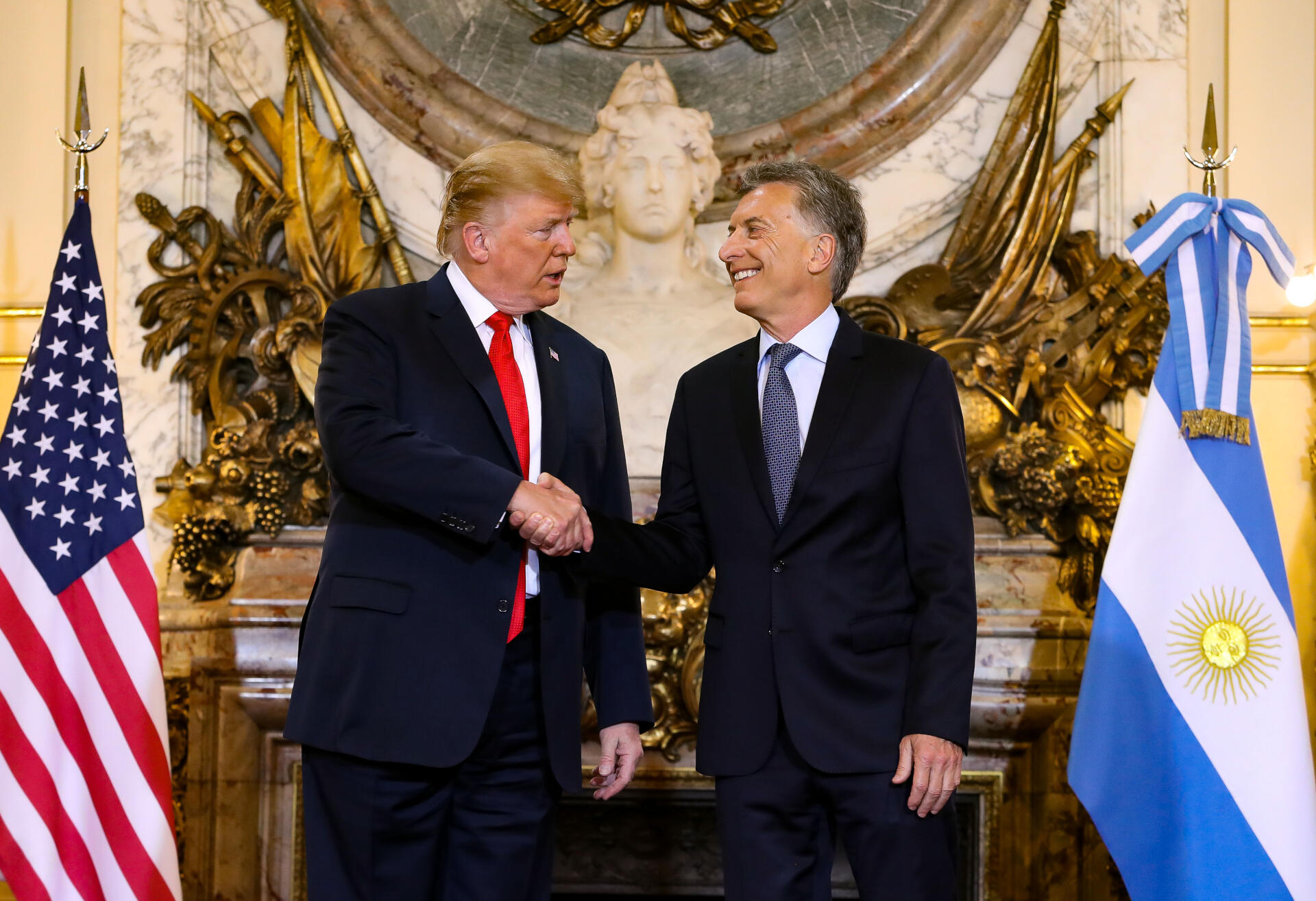
Macri shaking hands with Donald Trump at Casa Rosada, November 2018

In 2019, Trump declassified more than 5,600 US documents about the Dirty War.

=== Europe ===
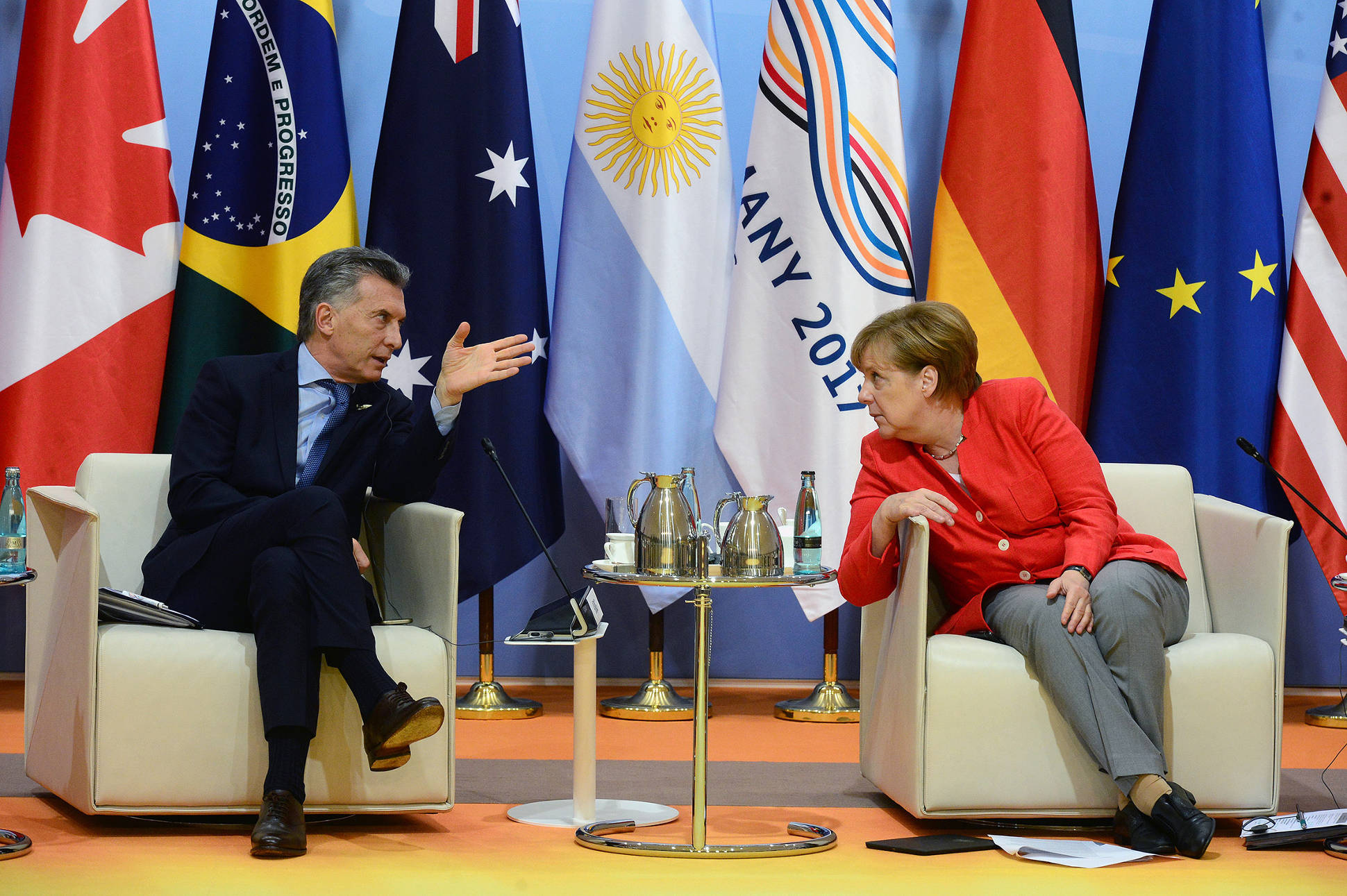
Macri with the German chancellor, Angela Merkel in Berlin, during his European tour, July 2016

Many European leaders publicly expressed support for the new government of Macri. German Chancellor Angela Merkel congratulated Macri and requested that he make a state visit to Germany. She added that the two countries have "always been deeply tied", particularly in the area of science, which she deemed "one of the pillars" of the two countries' relations. Merkel also remarked that she would be "thankful" if the countries could strengthen cooperation "in all areas". Spanish Prime Minister Mariano Rajoy, who has a close relationship with Macri, congratulated him and invited him to carry out a state visit "as soon as possible", stating that he is confident that the new government will "lead this new stage with success" while offering "the necessary support to consolidate the historical ties of friendship, fraternity and cooperation". The relationship between Spain and Argentina had become increasingly tense under the presidency of Cristina Kirchner, particularly after the Renationalization of YPF in 2012. In a telegram to Macri, Russian President Vladimir Putin expressed his hopes that the two countries will continue to increase the "bilateral cooperation within diverse areas and the coordination of efforts to resolve current occurrences within the international agenda", adding that "the fundamental interests of the people of Russia and Argentina contribute to guarantee the stability and security of Latin America and the world", while reminding Macri that the countries had recently celebrated 130 years of diplomatic relations. Putin also made reference to the ongoing nuclear power and hydrocarbon extraction projects between the countries. In February 2016, Macri received the President of Bulgaria, Rosen Plevneliev, at the Casa Rosada in Buenos Aires. Both leaders spoke of investments in each country; Plevneliev also met with entrepreneurs and visited the National Congress.

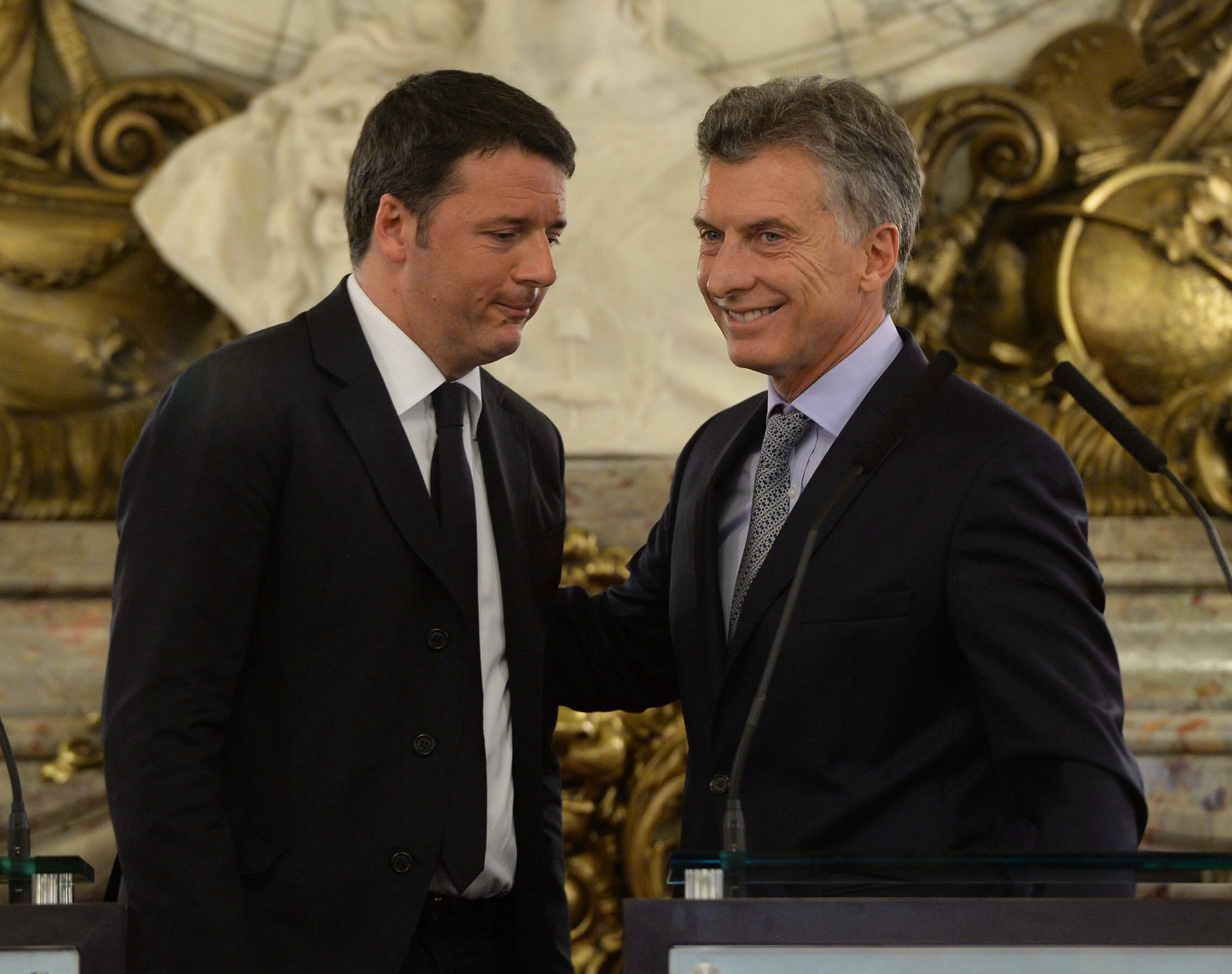
Macri with Italian prime minister Matteo Renzi, in 2016

Italian Prime Minister Matteo Renzi called Macri on the night of his victory and stated that he would meet soon with the new president to "open a new page of collaboration between the two countries". He also highlighted the historical and cultural ties between the two countries, stating that "it is the country with the largest presence of Italian citizens in the world", numbering some 900,000. The Cambiemos victory also provoked much reaction in the domestic Italian press. On 15 February 2016, Renzi met with Macri for a two-day state visit to Buenos Aires; Renzi was the first European leader to meet Macri after the 2015 presidential election and the first Italian Prime Minister since Romano Prodi in 1998 to visit Argentina.

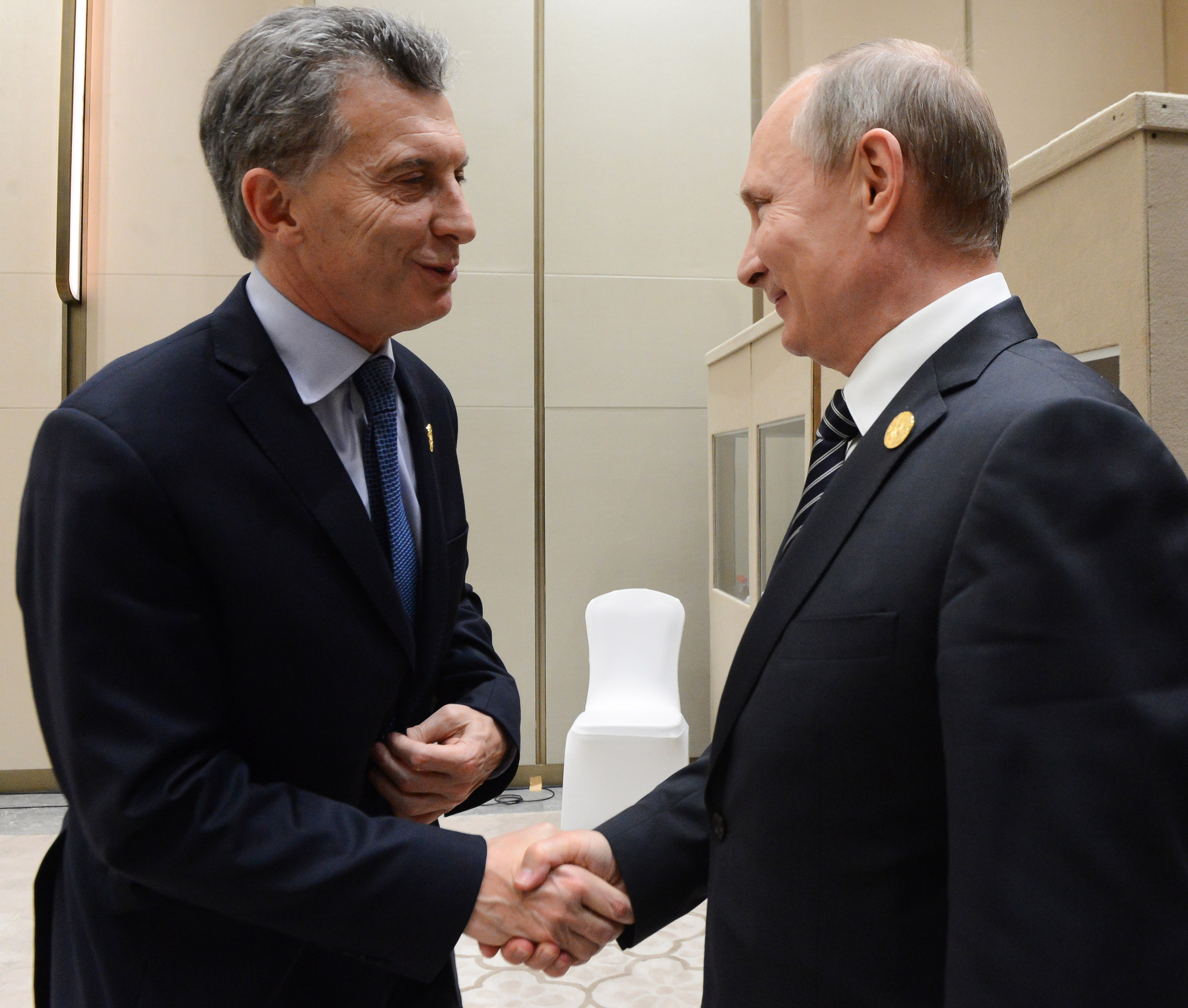
Macri with the Russian president Vladimir Putin, September 2016.

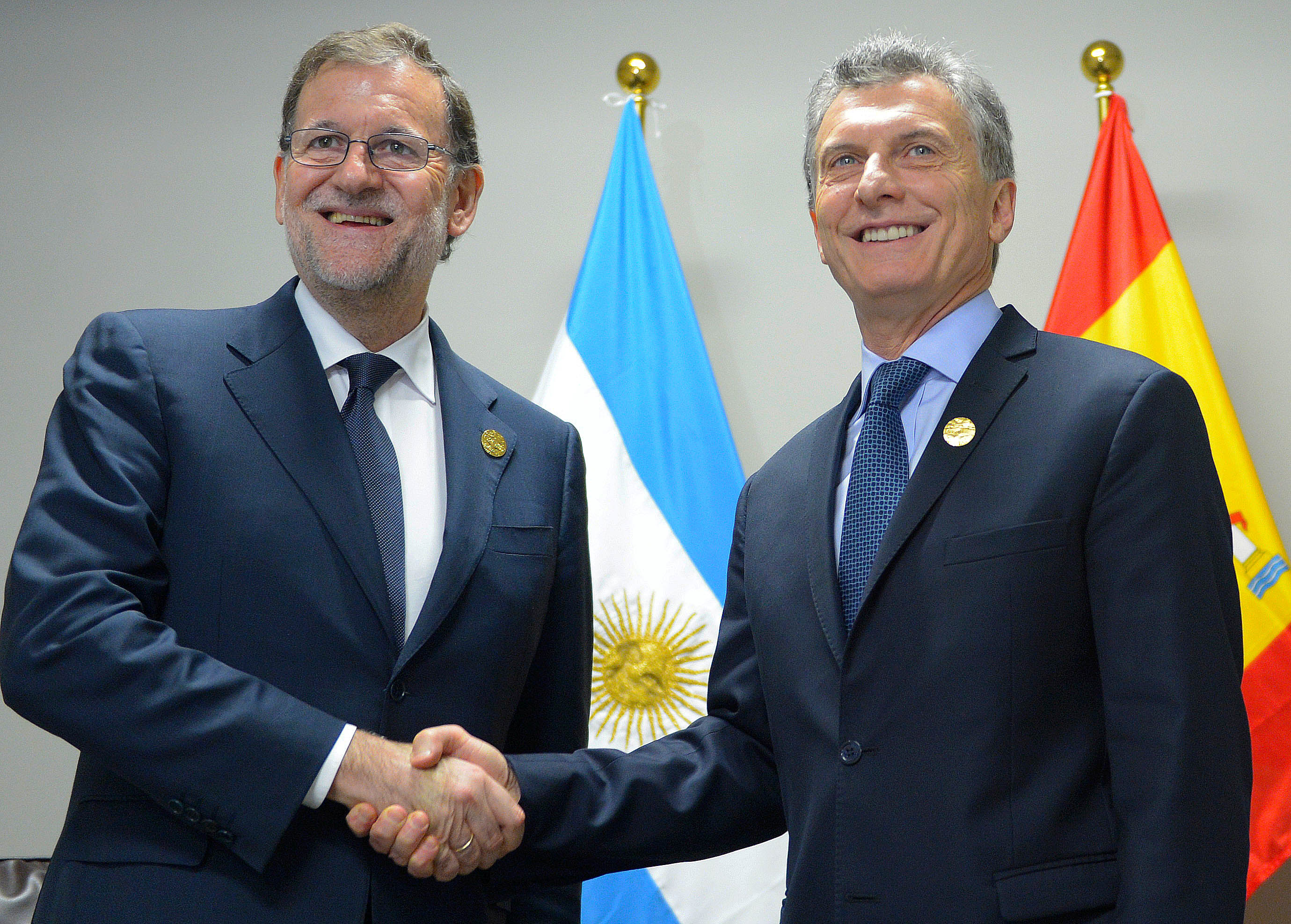
Macri with Prime Minister of Spain, Mariano Rajoy

French President François Hollande sent a telegram to Macri and expressed "We will have the opportunity at that time to deepen our dialogue and our bilateral relationship that is one of the densest known to the Latin American continent". Hollande also confirmed a state visit to Argentina in February 2016. Upon congratulating President Macri on his victory in the 2015 election, President Hollande announced that he would visit Argentina in February 2016. During his state visit to Buenos Aires on 24–25 February 2016, Macri and Hollande signed 20 bilateral agreements.

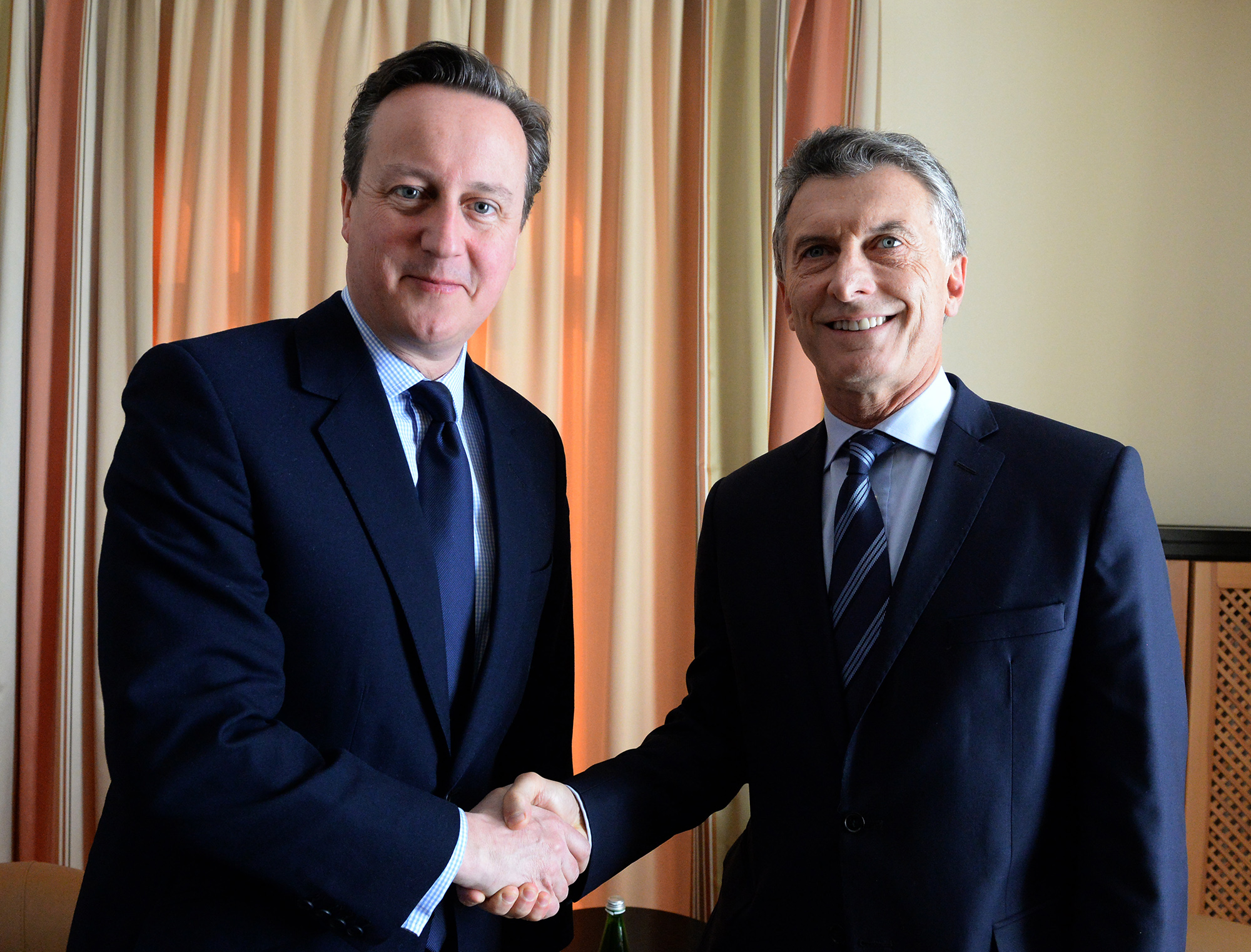
Macri with the UK PM, David Cameron

British Prime Minister David Cameron called Macri after his election to congratulate him and offer his support for his presidency. A Downing Street spokesperson stated that "both leaders expect to meet in the near future", emphasising trade relations and investments, while also prioritising the establishment of a free trade agreement between MERCOSUR and the European Union "as soon as possible". The chancellor Susana Malcorra clarified that Argentina would maintain the Argentine claim in the Falkland Islands sovereignty dispute, but would also try to expand the Argentina–United Kingdom relations into other areas of interest. Macri met Cameron at the World Economic Forum in Davos, Switzerland, to which Argentina officially returned after 12 years. After the meeting, Macri said he had a "very nice meeting" with Cameron and explained in a brief meeting with journalists that their goal is to initiate "a relationship in which all issues on the table are placed under one umbrella". Chancellor Malcorra reported that the dispute over the sovereignty of the Falkland Islands was one of the most important axes of the meeting, but not the only one. "Focusing our relationship only in the Islands is to stay with the glass half full," said the minister.

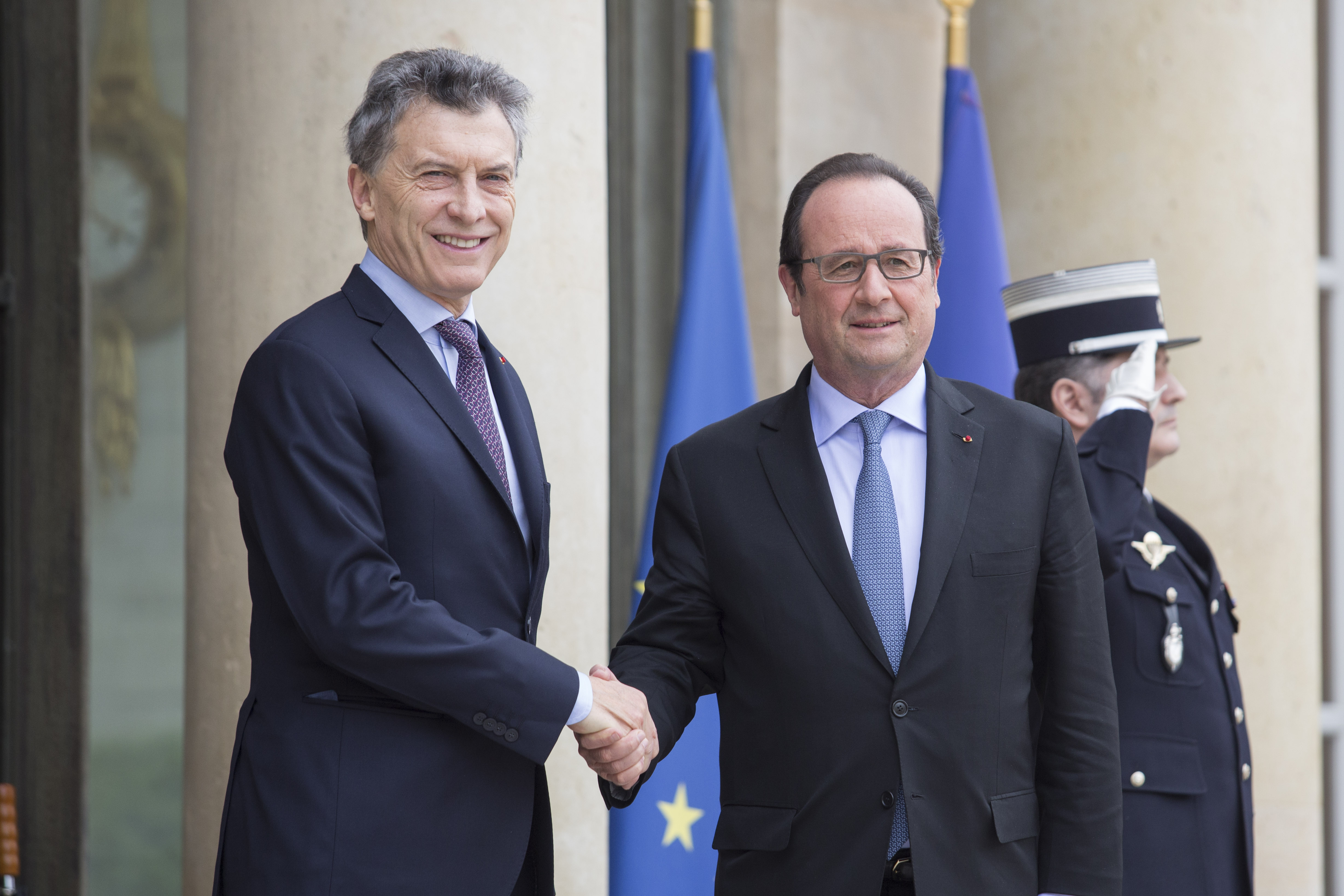
Macri with the French president, François Hollande in Paris

In July 2016, President Macri started a European tour that took him to France, Belgium and Germany, where he sought to project his international leadership as a political and commercial partner of the European Union. Macri held in Paris a meeting with French President Francois Hollande, and Berlin with German Chancellor Angela Merkel, in this case in the context of a two-day official visit in which the President was accompanied by businessmen. In addition to meeting with the two leaders brunt of the European Union, Macri was received in Brussels by the European Council President Donald Tusk, the High Representative of the European Union for Foreign Affairs, Federica Mogherini, and by King Philip and Queen Mathilde at the Royal Palace of Brussels.

=== Asia ===
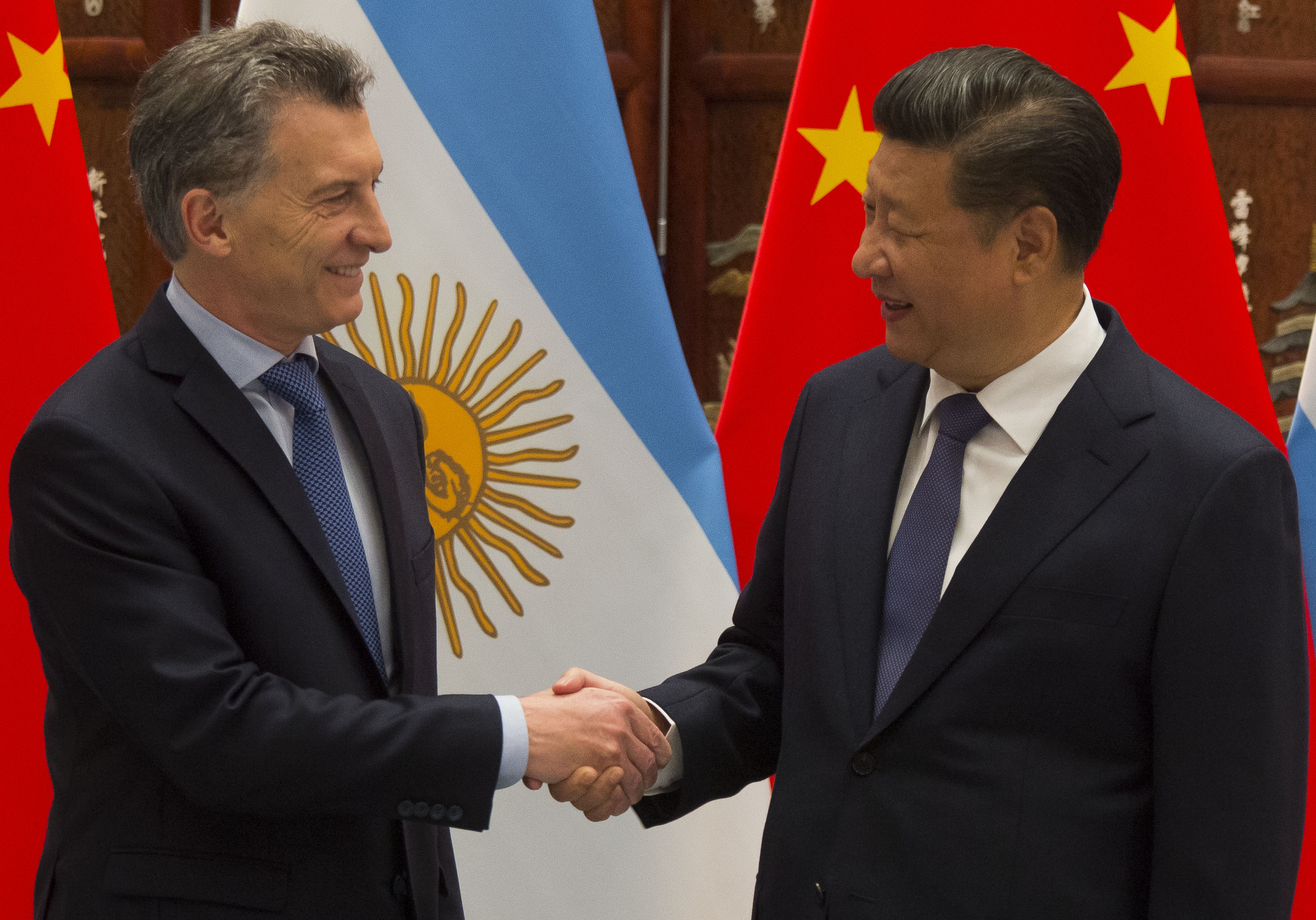
Macri with Chinese president Xi Jinping during the 2016 G20 summit

On 27 March 2016, a Casa Rosada official announced that President Macri will meet with Chinese president Xi Jinping on 1 April in the framework of the 2016 Nuclear Security Summit in Washington D.C. China and Argentina established diplomatic relations in 1972 but revived especially during the mandates of Nestor Kirchner and Cristina Kirchner, during which relations reached the level of "Comprehensive Strategic Partnership". However, since the assumption of Macri, the relationship was observed for the promises of the now head of state during the election campaign to "review" the proceedings between the Casa Rosada and Beijing between 2003 and 2015. Both countries signed agreements in 2015 for the construction of two new nuclear power plants in Argentina, with a total investment of 15,000 million dollars in an operation in which China pledged 85 percent of funding. China is the second main destination of Argentine exports after Brazil.

During the 2016 Nuclear Security Summit Macri also met with Japanese prime minister Shinzo Abe, Indian prime minister Narendra Modi and South Korean president Park Geun-hye with the aim to resume relations and try to add investors in Argentina. Japan and South Korea have a strong interest in investing in the areas of mining, energy, and infrastructure, and to raise levels of trade with Argentina. It is also known that there is a strong interest of Japanese and Korean companies to invest in the lithium deposits of the Argentine Northwest.

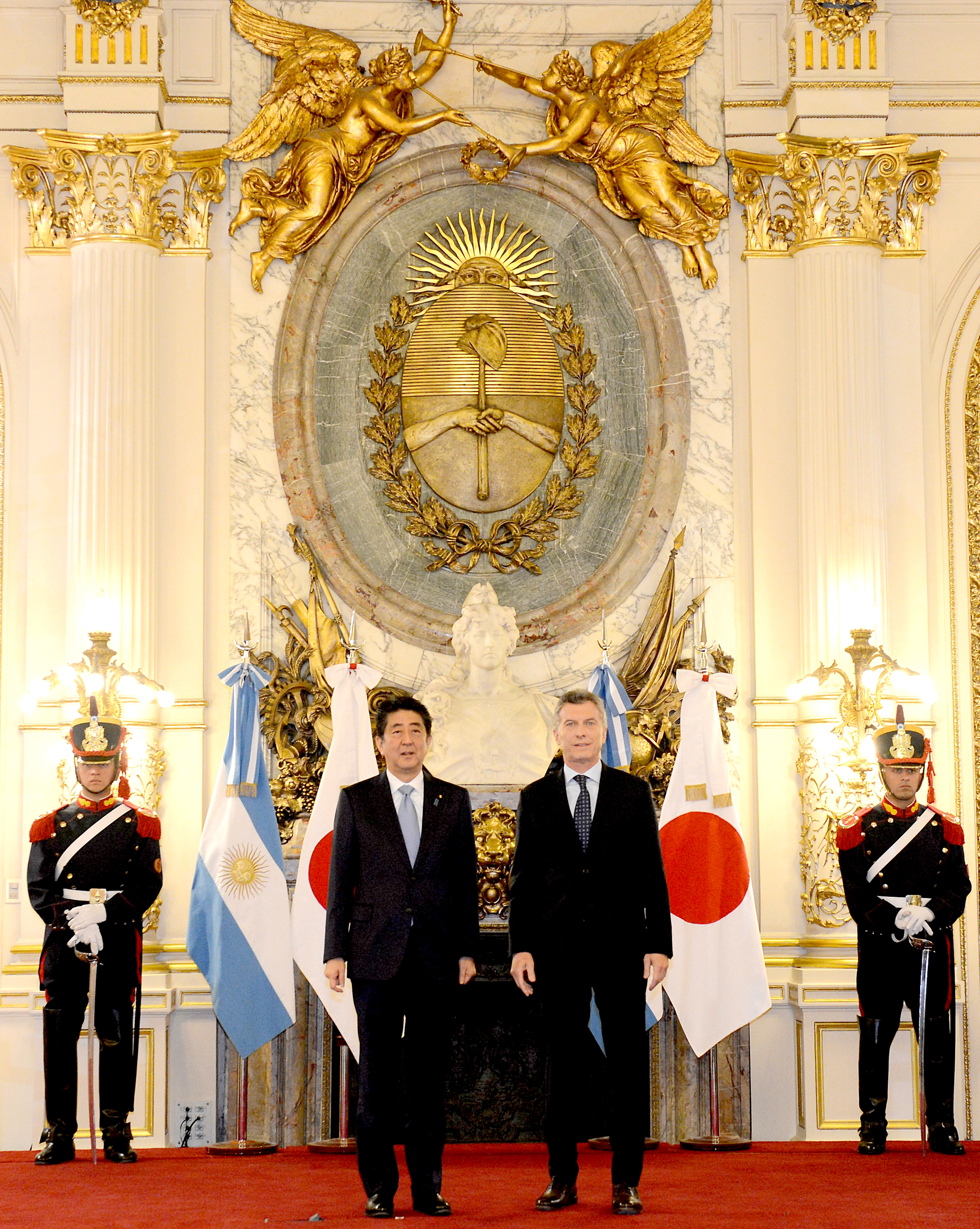
Macri with Japanese prime minister Shinzo Abe at the Casa Rosada in Buenos Aires, November 2016

In September 2016, during the G20 summit in Hangzhou, China, President Macri met with Indian prime minister Narendra Modi and they made a commitment to expand the relations between Argentina and India. "I think so far the relationship between our countries has been a little superficial. It's a good opportunity to deepen" Macri said. Macri met Modi in one of the last added to its agenda of activities at the G20 summit bilateral meetings. Macri expressed interest to "increase and diversify" Argentine exports to India and for Indian companies to "come to invest in our country." Modi also expressed satisfaction that the Confederation of Indian Industry will participate in the Business Forum in the city of Buenos Aires. In addition, the Argentine president exchanged a greeting with Indonesian president Joko Widodo. In both meetings Macri was accompanied by Foreign Minister Susana Malcorra, Economy Minister Alfonso Prat-Gay, and Secretary of Strategic Affairs Fulvio Pompeo.

In November 2016, President Macri received Japanese prime minister Shinzo Abe in the Casa Rosada of Buenos Aires to give a new impetus to the economic and commercial relations between both nations. Abe's state visit to Argentina was the first of a Japanese leader in 57 years. Macri and Abe signed several bilateral instruments, including a Memorandum of Cooperation for the establishment of an enhanced mechanism for political consultations. The last precedent was in 1959, when Nobusuke Kishi, Abe's grandfather, arrived to hold a bilateral meeting with the then President Arturo Frondizi.

=== Middle East ===
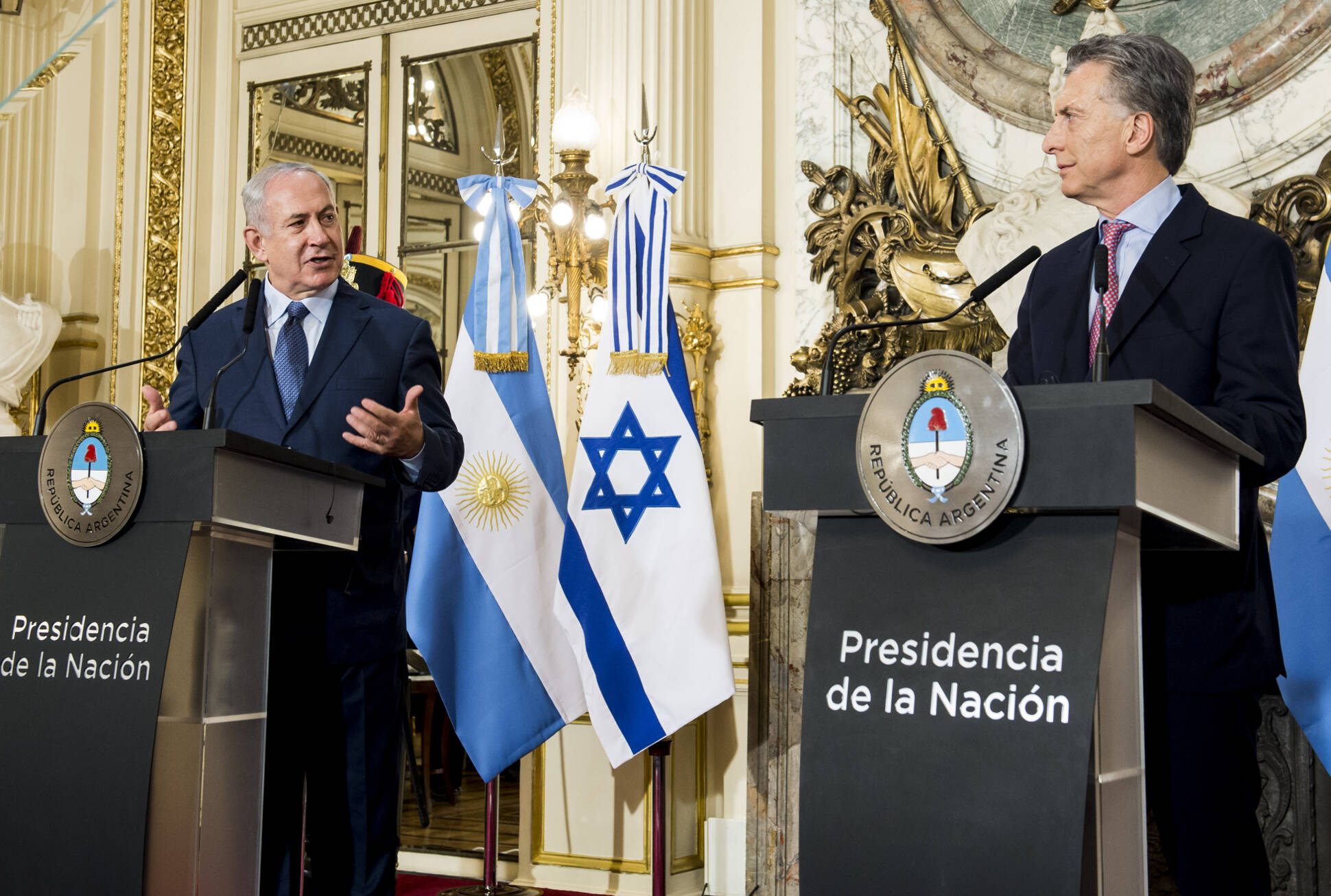
Macri with Israel PM, Netanyahu at Casa Rosada, September 2017

On 21 December, government lawyers withdrew an appeal in Federal Court made by his predecessor, over the constitutionality of a memorandum she had signed with the Iranian government, to investigate the 1994 AMIA bombing. The memorandum was criticized by both Israel and Argentina's Jewish community, as Iran was long suspected of being involved in the attack. The memorandum had been ruled unconstitutional by a federal court during Kirchner's administration, and along with the withdrawal of the appeal, the memorandum was voided by Macri's administration. The move was praised by Israeli Prime Minister Benjamin Netanyahu as an improvement of bilateral relations.

In July 2016 President Macri met with the Emir of Qatar, Tamim bin Hamad Al Thani, at the Presidential Residence of Olivos. Both led the signing of memorandums of understanding signed Chancellor, Susana Malcorra, and his Qatari counterpart, Mohammed bin Abdulrahman bin Jassim Al-Thani. also they attended by the Chief of Staff, Marcos Peña, and the Minister of Finance and Public Finance, Alfonso Prat-Gay. In 2015, Argentina exported to Qatar goods by 11.5 million dollars and imported worth just over 153 million dollars, what, 141 million deficit in bilateral balance totaled 164 million, down 35 percent in relation to 2014, when the exchange was 471.5 million dollars, according to statistics from the Inter-American Development Bank (IDB).

In July 2016, it was announced that Argentina would grant asylum to 3,000 refugees of the Syrian Civil War.

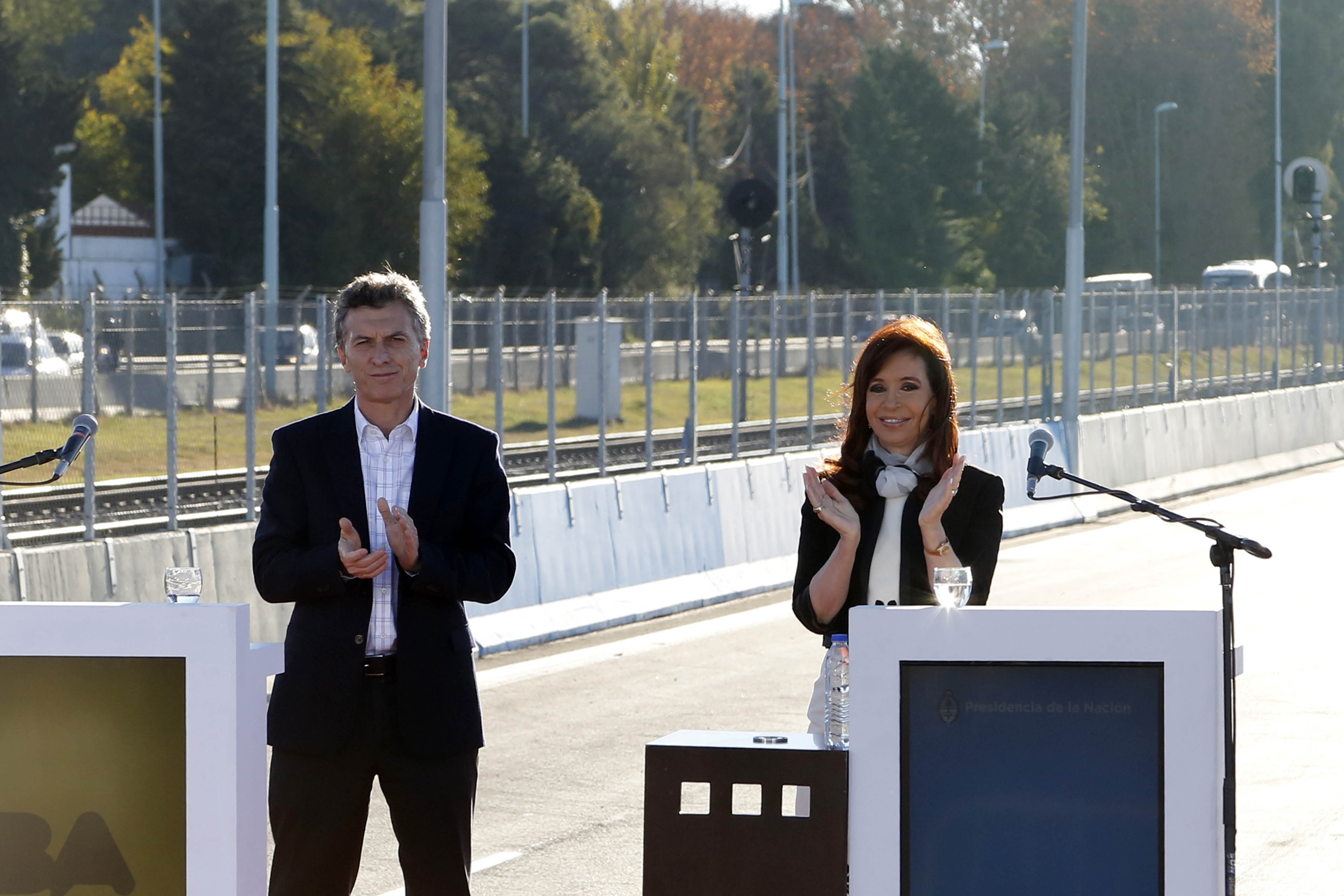
Macri with then-president now predecessor Cristina Fernández de Kirchner, the two had been rivals since he took office in 2015
