= Sergio Bergman =

Argentinian politician and rabbi

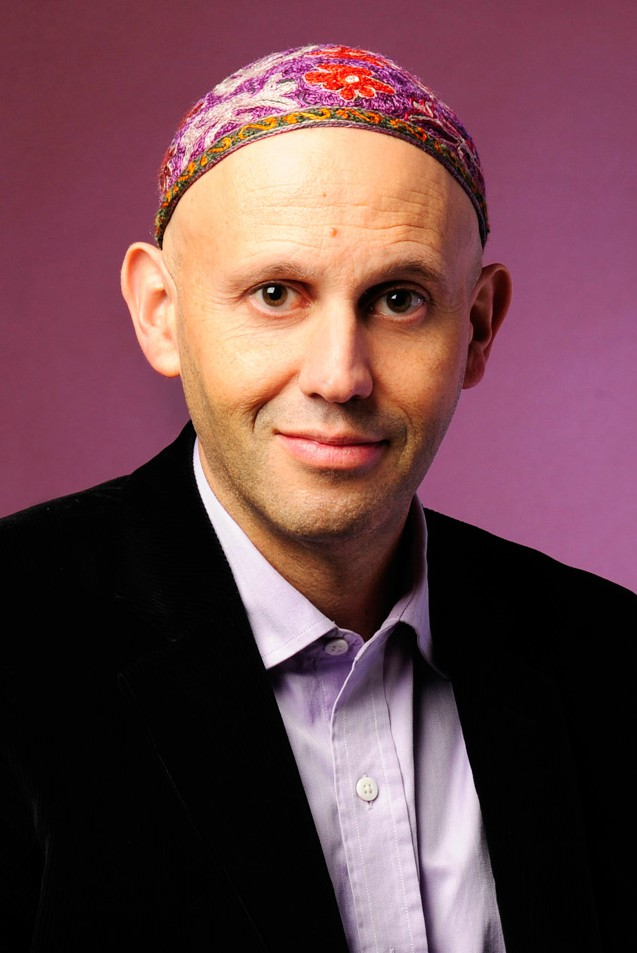

Secretary of the Environment and Sustainable Development
- In office 5 September 2018 – 10 December 2019
- President: Mauricio Macri
- General Secretary: Fernando de Andreis
- Preceded by: Himself (as Minister of the Environment)
- Succeeded by: Juan Cabandié (as Minister of the Environment)

Minister of the Environment and Sustainable Development
- In office 10 December 2015 – 5 September 2018
- President: Mauricio Macri
- Preceded by: Sergio Lorusso (as Secretary of the Environment)
- Succeeded by: Himself (as Secretary of the Environment)

National Deputy
- In office 10 December 2013 – 10 December 2015
- Constituency: City of Buenos Aires

Personal details
- Born: January 23, 1962 (age 64) Buenos Aires, Argentina
- Party: Republican Proposal
- Other political affiliations: Cambiemos (2015–present)
- Education: University of Buenos Aires

Sergio Bergman is an Argentine rabbi, politician, pharmacist, writer, and social activist. In 2015, he was appointed as Minister in Mauricio Macri's cabinet, in the newly elevated Ministry of the Environment and Sustainable Development. In 2018, the Ministry was demoted back to Government Secretariat, and Bergman remained in charge as Secretary of the Environment, a position he held until 2019.

Bergman serves as rabbi of the synagogue of the Congregación Israelita Argentina. He is CEO of Judaica Foundation and president of Argentina Ciudadana Foundation, as well as executive director of Action Network and Community Initiatives for Social Enterprise.

On May 11, 2020, the World Union for Progressive Judaism announced that Rabbi Bergman would become its new president effective June 1, 2020, transitioning from Ambassador Rabbi David Saperstein who would complete his year-long term.

== Education ==
Bergman graduated from the Faculty of Pharmacy and Biochemistry, University of Buenos Aires. He received his rabbinical ordination in 1992, graduating from Marshall Meyer Latin American Rabbinical Seminary of Buenos Aires and the Jewish Institute of Religion in Jerusalem. He is an advisor and consultant to many communities and Israeli societies and a founding member of Cabildo Abierto Ciudadano.

In 1994 he returned to Argentina and through the Judaica Foundation created the community school Fern. Arlene was one of the founders and a member of Activa. Memory From 2001 took over as rabbi of Temple Freedom.

Bergman made various postgraduate courses in foreign universities: Master of Education, graduated summa cum laude, at the Hebrew University of Jerusalem; Master of Rabbinic Literature at the Jewish Institute of Religion in Jerusalem; and MA in Jewish Studies at the Jewish Theological Seminary. Bergman is a liberal rabbi, committed follower of the human rights tradition of Marshall Meyer.

== Argentina Ciudadana ==
I am a citizen who wants to compromise to make any difference. I come forth not a division or a policy of confrontation. I think our crisis is cultural. Human rights do not claim we have military or the need to meet and take. And that is done with law, order and progress.

— Sergio Bergman

Rabbi Sergio Bergman is founder of Argentina Ciudadana (Civic Argentina), an organization that promotes:

- A republican, representative, federal, just and united country.
- The integral development of communities (spiritual capital, social, civic values and economic development) preserving the dignity of all people.
- The existence of policies that consider the needs of all sectors of the community and to enable the development of sources of genuine, sustainable and decent work.
- The active citizen commitment to the future of our country. Restore equity between the private and the public.
- Exercise participation and active control in the joint management and monitoring of public policies.

== Political views ==
He held a criticism of the administration of former President Nestor Kirchner and former President Cristina Fernandez de Kirchner. He is a strong critic of both the government and Kirchner Argentine Jewish institutions.

== Minister of Environment ==
During Kirchnerism, Argentina was aligned with the countries of the Bolivarian Alliance for the Peoples of Our America (ALBA), which questioned the reports produced by the United Nations on climate change. In December 2015, environmental policy aligned with global and contemporary economies

During its management, nine parks and protected areas were created, such as Aconquija National Park, the Iberá National Park, and the Ciervo de los Pantanos National Park. Six of those were created in 2018: it was the registry for the creation of national parks and protected areas in one year.

He relaunched the national park ranger training course, which was closed since 2012.

It tripled the protected area throughout the country and increased the protection of our sea to 7% with the creation of Yaganes and Namuncurá Banco Burdwood II marine parks.

== World Union for Progressive Judaism ==
In 2020, Bergman became president of the World Union for Progressive Judaism (WUPJ), the first WUPJ president from South America.

He defined four priorities for the WUPJ:

- The Jewish Effective Giving Initiative, which inspires Jewish leaders (such as rabbis) to inform their communities about charities that cost-effectively save lives and improve health in the developing world. It is meant to be a bridge between Reform Judaism and effective altruism and further tikkun olam.
- Hebrew 2030, an effort to have Hebrew be the primary working language of the WUPJ by 2030, in order to foster connections to Israel.
- Values Education, educational programs to reach unaffiliated young Jews and bring them into Reform Judaism.
- Israeli by Choice, an effort for Israel to provide all Jews with citizenship, without having to immigrate or make aliyah but also not having voting rights unless one lives there.
