= Synagogue of the Israelite Argentine Congregation =

Synagogue of the Israelite Argentine Congregation (Templo Libertad)
- Spanish: Sinagoga de la Congregación Israelita Argentina
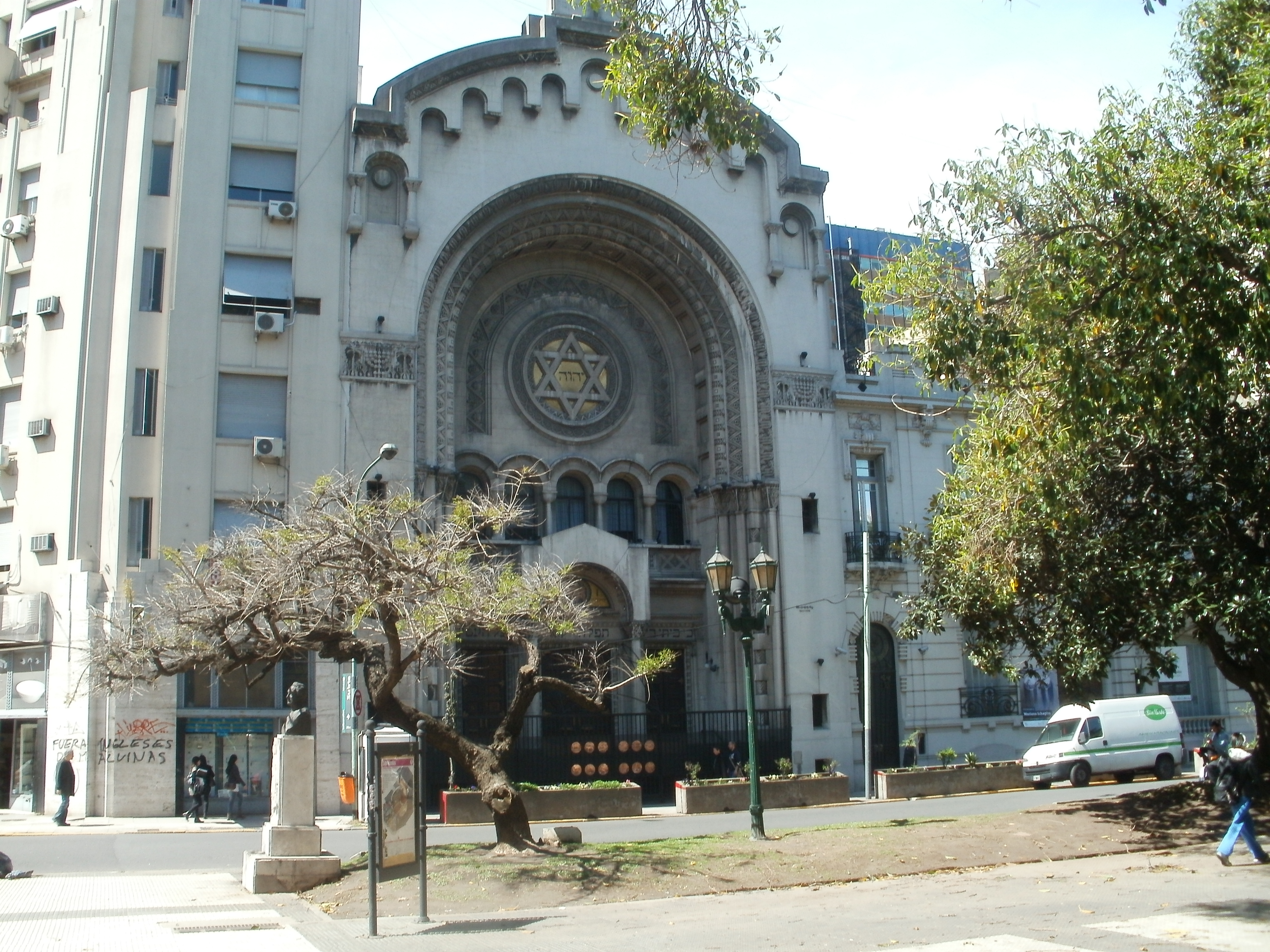
- The synagogue façade in 2007

- Location of the synagogue in Buenos Aires

Religion
- Affiliation: Reform Judaism
- Ecclesiastical or organizational status: Synagogue
- Leadership: Rabbi Sergio Bergman
- Status: Active

Location
- Location: Libertad 769, Buenos Aires
- Country: Argentina
- Interactive map of Synagogue of the Israelite Argentine Congregation (Templo Libertad)
- Coordinates: 34°35′58.1″S 58°23′1.3″W

Architecture
- Architects: Alejandro Enquin; Eugenio Gantner
- Type: Synagogue architecture
- Style: Romanesque Revival
- Established: c. 1890s (as a congregation)
- Groundbreaking: 1897
- Completed: 1932
- Capacity: 700 worshippers

Website
- templolibertad.org.ar

The Synagogue of the Israelite Argentine Congregation (Spanish: Sinagoga de la Congregación Israelita Argentina), commonly known as the Liberty Temple (Spanish: Templo Libertad), is a Reform Jewish congregation and synagogue, located at 769 Libertad Street, near the famous Teatro Colón, in Buenos Aires, Argentina. The synagogue is home to the Congregación Israelita de la República Argentina and houses a Jewish history museum. Established in the 1890s, the congregation is the oldest in Argentina.

== History ==
The cornerstone was laid in 1897. The construction of the building took 35 years, and it was inaugurated in 1932. The project was led by the engineers Alejandro Enquin and Eugenio Gantner. The building's Romanesque Revival style has influences from German synagogues of the mid-19th century. It has capacity for 700 people.

== See also ==
- History of the Jews in Argentina
- List of synagogues in Argentina
