= Juan Cabandié =

Argentine politician

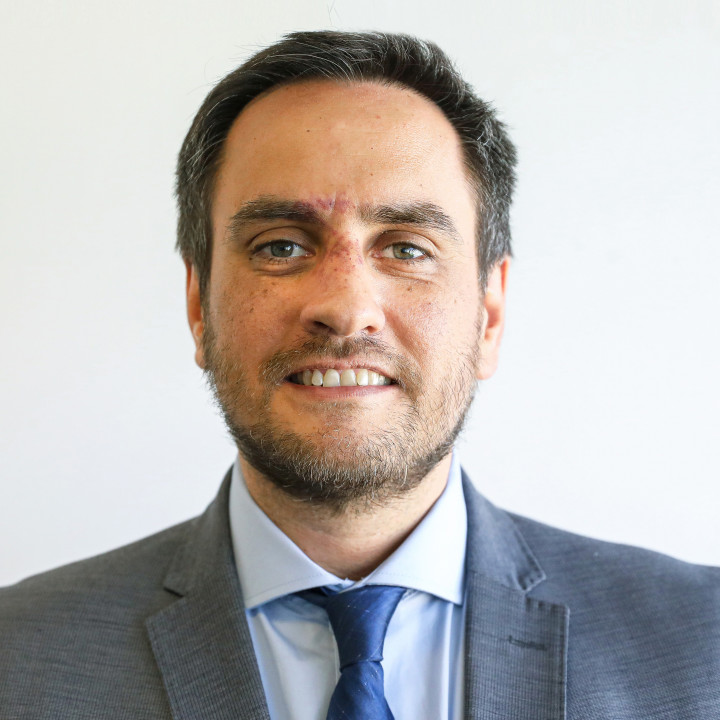

Minister of the Environment
- In office 10 December 2019 – 10 December 2023
- President: Alberto Fernández
- Preceded by: Sergio Bergman (as Secretary of the Environment)
- Succeeded by: Office abolished

National Deputy
- In office 10 December 2013 – 10 December 2019
- Constituency: City of Buenos Aires

Legislator of the City of Buenos Aires
- In office 10 December 2007 – 10 December 2013

Personal details
- Born: Juan Cabandié; 16 March 1978 (age 48) ESMA, Buenos Aires, Argentina
- Party: Justicialist Party
- Other political affiliations: Front for Victory (2004–2017); La Cámpora (since 2006); Frente de Todos (since 2019)
- Occupation: Teacher, politician

Juan Cabandié (Spanish pronunciation: [ˈxwaŋ kaβanˈdje]; Buenos Aires, 16 March, 1978) is an Argentine politician, human rights activist and teacher. A member of the Justicialist Party and a founding member of La Cámpora, a kirchnerist youth organization, Cabandié served two terms in the Argentine Chamber of Deputies before serving as Minister of the Environment and Sustainable Development by President Alberto Fernández from 2019 to 2023.

Born in 1978 in the ESMA clandestine detention center, Cabandié is the son of two "desaparecidos", alleged political dissidents of the military dictatorship that ruled Argentina from 1976 to 1983. Raised under a false name by a family linked to the dictatorship, Cabandié discovered his true identity in 2004 with the help of the Grandmothers of the Plaza de Mayo, becoming the 77th grandchild to have their identity restored.

== Early life ==
Juan Cabandié was born in March 1978 in the ESMA clandestine detention center, where his mother, Alicia Alfonsín (then aged 17), was being held in captivity after being kidnapped by the Armed Forces during the last military dictatorship of Argentina (1976–1983). She and Cabandié's father, Damián Abel Cabandié (aged 19) were taken from their homes by the military on 23 November 1977. Damián Abel Cabandié and Alicia Alfonsín remain "disappeared" to this day.

The newborn Juan stayed with his mother during the first days of his life, following which he was taken by a non-commissioned officer and given to a Federal Police officer named Luis Falco, to be raised by him and his wife, Teresa Perrone, as their own child. Cabandié grew up unaware of his true parentage and identity under a false name. In Cabandié's own words, Falco's attitude towards him and the "lack of memories and records" in his family led him to doubt the veracity of his identity.

=== Restoration of his identity ===
Cabandié's doubts on his identity led him to press his parents on the subject, and eventually, in 2003, Parrone de Falco admitted the truth to him. Accompanied by his adoptive sister, Vanina Falco, Cabandié went to the National Commission for the Right to Identity (CONADI) and to the Grandmothers of the Plaza de Mayo to start the inquiries about his identity. On 26 January 2004, Cabandié's was informed that his DNA had matched that of Damián Abel Cabandié and Alicia Alfosín's, as recorded in the Grandmothers' genetic database. He was the 77th grandchild whose identity was restored by the Grandmothers. His true name was restored as well; Cabandié has repeatedly said that, during his childhood and adolescence, he had chosen for himself the name of Juan, and had dreams in which his mother called him by that name.

Cabandié has stated that, although he considers Luis Falco to be a mere appropriator who kept his true identity from him, he holds ambiguous feelings over Teresa Perrone, whom he considers his "foster mother". He also considers Vanina Falco his true sister; she asked to stand as a plaintiff with her brother in the trial against Luis Falco, but the court denied her request due to her close relationship to both Falco and Cabandié.

Luis Antonio Falco was sentenced to 18 years in prison by a Buenos Aires tribunal in 2011 for the crimes of appropriation of minors and suppression of identity. It is, to this date, the highest penalty granted to anyone on those grounds.

== Political career ==
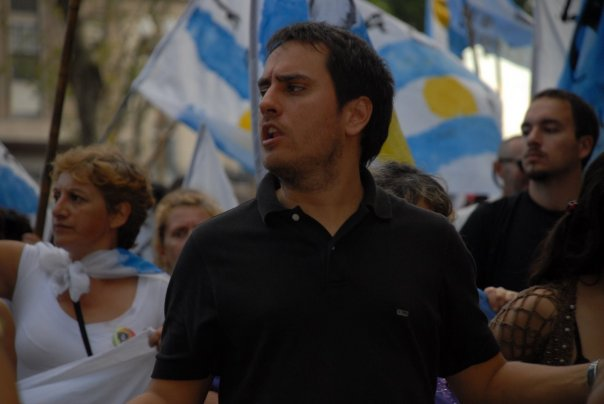
Cabandié as a city legislator in 2009.

Following the restoration of his identity in 2004, Cabandié was invited by then president Néstor Kirchner to give a speech at an official act in the former ESMA detention center, now a designated memorial space; this was the first time he made a public appearance in a political act. From then on, he began to be more and more involved in politics and eventually became one of the co-founders of La Cámpora, the main youth wing of the Front for Victory (FPV) and the Kirchnerist movement, alongside Máximo Kirchner, Eduardo de Pedro, and Mariano Recalde, and others. Cabandié was also secretary general of the Peronist Youth (JP) and human rights secretary of the Justicialist Party.

Ahead of the 2007 elections in Buenos Aires, Cabandié ran in the Front for Victory list to the City Legislature as the fourth candidate. Although the FPV only received enough votes to win three seats in the Legislature, one of the elected candidates, Ginés González García, took up the position of Argentine ambassador to Chile and so Cabandié was sworn in in his stead. He was re-elected to the Legislature in 2011 as the first candidate in the FPV list. He would then serve as president of the FPV parliamentary bloc in the Legislature. During his term as city legislator he introduced legislation to erect a monument to Diego Maradona, whom Cabandié lauded as an "icon of popular culture".

=== Member of the Chamber of Deputies ===
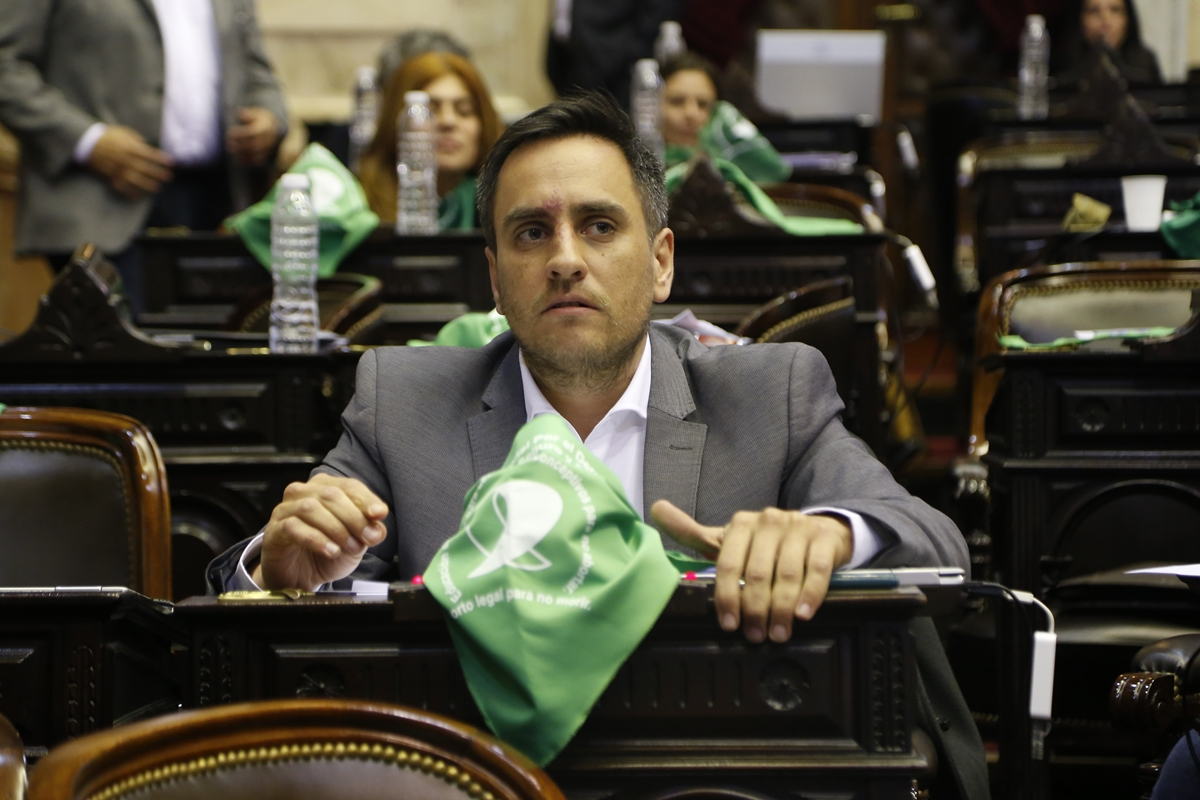
Cabandié, as a National Deputy, during the session to vote on the Voluntary Termination of Pregnancy (IVE) bill in 2018.

In 2013 Cabandié was elected to the Argentine Chamber of Deputies on the FPV list for the City of Buenos Aires. He served as member and vice president of the parliamentary commission on consumer and user rights and fair competition. During his time in office he sponsored a number of bills aimed at protecting consumer rights, such as a bill on price and offers display. He was re-elected in 2017 as the third candidate in the Unidad Porteña list within the Citizen's Unity alliance.

In 2018, Cabandié voted in favor of the Voluntary Termination of Pregnancy (IVE) bill that intended to legalize abortion in Argentina; the bill passed the Chamber of Deputies but was eventually struck down by the Senate. According to Cabandié, going into the vote he was "unsure" about his position, but that "the women's fight made [him] reflect [on it]".

=== Minister of the Environment ===
On 10 December 2019, Cabandié was appointed by incoming president Alberto Fernández as minister of the newly restored Ministry of the Environment and Sustainable Development, succeeding Sergio Bergman, who was secretary of the environment in Mauricio Macri's cabinet.

As minister, Cabandié overturned a decree signed by former president Macri that loosened restrictions on the import of plastic waste. The environment ministry has also had to deal with the worst fires in decades, that have hit locations across Argentina since late 2019.
