= Ministry of the Environment and Sustainable Development (Argentina) =

Former government ministry of Argentina

- Ministerio de Ambiente y Desarrollo Sostenible
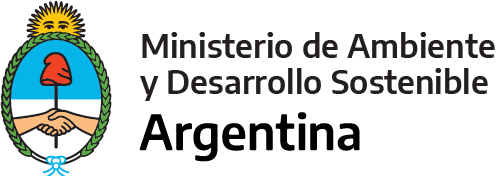

Ministry overview
- Formed: 2015; 11 years ago
- Preceding Ministry: Secretariat of the Environment and Sustainable Development
- Dissolved: December 10, 2023; 2 years ago
- Jurisdiction: Government of Argentina
- Headquarters: San Martín 451, Buenos Aires
- Annual budget: $ 5,882,000 (2018)
- Minister responsible: Juan Cabandié
- Website: argentina.gob.ar/ambiente

The Ministry of the Environment and Sustainable Development (Spanish: Ministerio de Ambiente y Desarrollo Sostenible; MAyDS) of Argentina was a ministry of the national executive power that oversaw the government's policy on environmental issues and promotes sustainable development.

It was formed in 2015, having previously existed as a Secretariat under different parent agencies.

The ministry was dissolved on December 10, 2023 following a presidential decree from President Javier Milei.

== History ==
The first governmental agency to deal exclusively with environmental issues in Argentina was the Secretariat of Natural Resources and Human Environment (Secretaría de Recursos Naturales y Ambiente Humano), created in 1991 during the presidency of Carlos Saúl Menem, which answered to the Office of the Chief of Cabinet. The first secretariat responsible was María Julia Alsogaray. Throughout the 1990s and into the 2000s the Secretariat was moved from the Chief of Cabinet's office to the Ministry of Social Development, the Ministry of Health, and then the Chief of Cabinet's office again.

In 2015, President Mauricio Macri elevated the secretariat to ministerial level in his first cabinet, appointing Sergio Bergman as minister. In 2018 Macri would reverse this decision, placing the now secretariat under the General Secretariat of the Presidency; Bergman retained the portfolio as Secretary.

From 2019-2023, under former President Alberto Fernández, the Ministry has regained its status in the cabinet, this time with Juan Cabandié as minister responsible.

== Structure and dependencies ==
The Ministry of the Environment and Sustainable Development counted with a number of centralized and decentralized dependencies. The centralized dependencies, as in other government ministers, are known as secretariats (secretarías) and undersecretariats (subsecretarías), as well as a number of other centralized agencies:

- Secretariat of Environmental Policy on Natural Resources (Secretaría de Política Ambiental en Recursos Naturales)
  - National Directorate of Environmental Administration of Water and Aquatic Eco-systems (Dirección Nacional de Gestión Ambiental del Agua y los Ecosistemas Acuáticos)
  - National Forests Directorate (Dirección Nacional de Bosques)
    - Reforestation and Forest Restoration Coordination (Coordinación de Reforestación y Restauración de Ambientes de Bosques)
  - National Biodiversity Directorate Dirección Nacional de Biodiversidad
  - National Directorate of Environmental Planning and Structure on Territory (Dirección Nacional de Planificación y Ordenamiento Ambiental del Territorio)
- Secretariat of Climate Change, Sustainable Development and Innovation (Secretaría de Cambio Climático, Desarrollo Sostenible e Innovación)
  - Directorate of Sustainable Development Innovation (Dirección de Innovación para el Desarrollo Sostenible)
    - Implementation of New Technologies Coordination (Coordinación de Implementación de Nuevas Tecnologías)
    - Innovation on Sustainable Productive Projects Coordination (Coordinación de Innovación en Proyectos Productivos Sostenibles)
    - Sustainable and Resilient Cities Coordination (Coordinación de Ciudades Sostenibles y Resilientes)
  - National Environmental Evaluation Directorate (Dirección Nacional de Evaluación Ambiental)
  - Environmental Impact Evaluation and Environmental Risk Assessment Directorate (Dirección de Evaluación de Impacto Ambiental y Análisis de Riesgo Ambiental)
  - National Climate Change Directorate (Dirección Nacional de Cambio Climático)
    - Climate Change Mitigation Coordination (Coordinación de Mitigación del Cambio Climático)
    - Climate Change Adaptation Coordination (Coordinación de Adaptación al Cambio Climático)
- Secretariat of Environmental Control and Surveillance (Secretaría de Control y Monitoreo Ambiental)
  - Surveillance and Prevention Directorate (Dirección de Monitoreo y Prevención)
  - National Substances and Chemical Products Directorate (Dirección Nacional de Sustancias y Productos Químicos)
    - Dangerous Residues Coordination (Coordinación de Residuos Peligrosos)
  - National Waste Direction (Dirección Nacional de Residuos)
    - Solid Urban Waste Coordination (Coordinación de Residuos Sólidos Urbanos)
  - Undersecretariat of Fiscalization and Recomposition (Subsecretaría de Fiscalización y Recomposición)
    - Vehicular Emissions Coordination (Coordinación de Emisiones Vehiculares)
    - Environmental Quality and Recomposition Directorate (Dirección de Calidad Ambiental y Recomposición)
    - Directorate of Inspections (Dirección de Inspecciones)
    - Directorate of Environmental Infractions (Dirección de Infracciones Ambientales)

The Administración de Parques Nacionales ("National Parks Administration", APN) also reports to the Ministry of the Environment and Sustainable Development as a decentralized agency.

== Headquarters ==
The Ministry of the Environment and Sustainable Development is headquartered at San Martín 451, located in the barrio of Monserrat, in Buenos Aires. The office building had previously housed the Secretariat of the Environment since its formation in 1991.

== List of ministers ==
No.	Minister	Party	Term	President
1	Sergio Bergman	Republican Proposal	10 December 2015 – 5 September 2018	Mauricio Macri
2	Juan Cabandié	Justicialist Party	10 December 2019 – 10 December 2023	Alberto Fernández
