= Hyperinflation =

Rapidly accelerating inflation

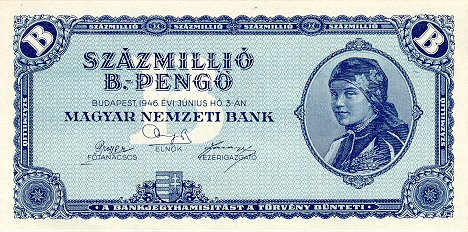
100 quintillion (10^{20}) pengő, the largest denomination bill ever issued, Hungary, 1946. 1 sextillion pengő notes were printed but never issued.

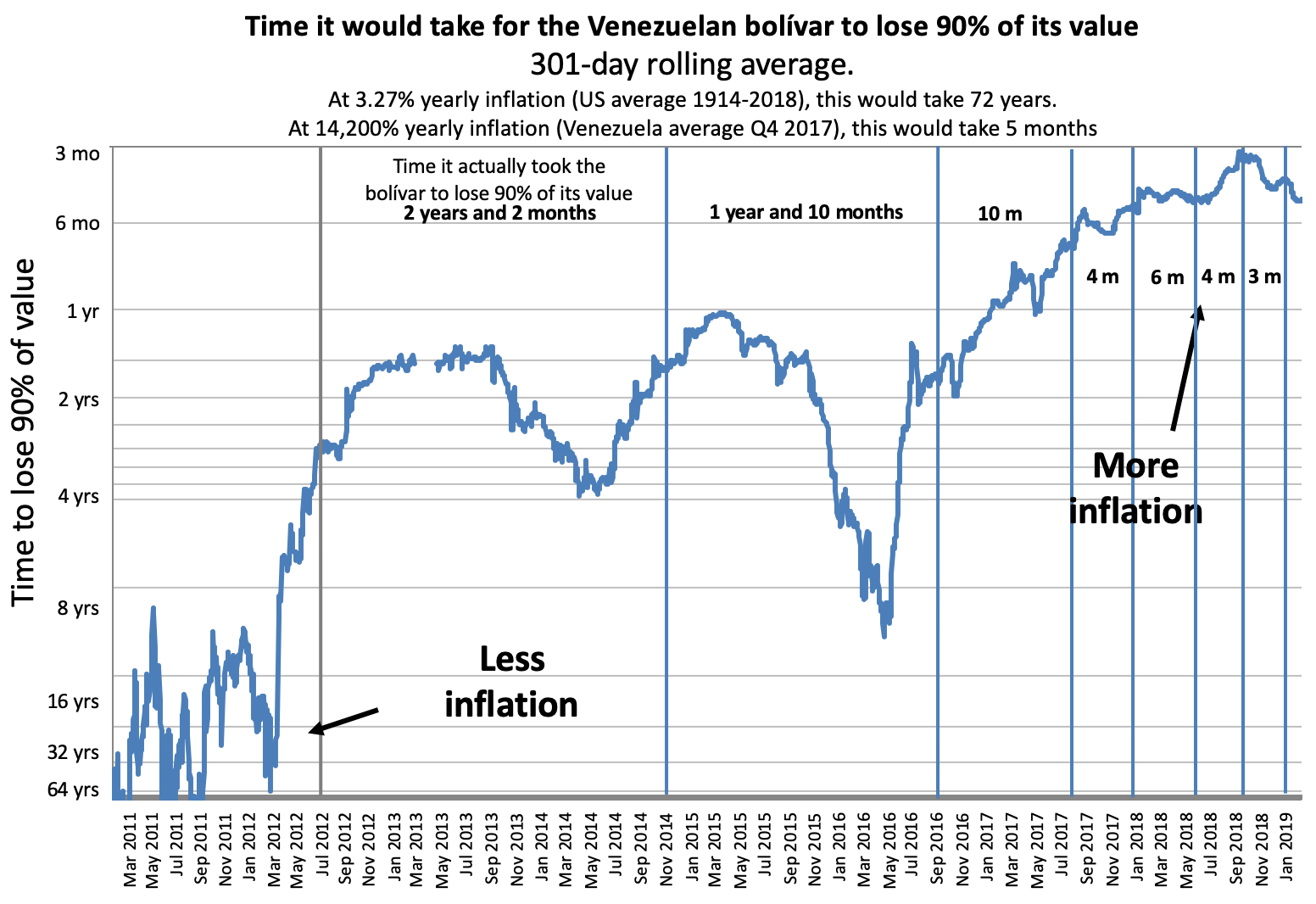
Hyperinflation in Venezuela represented by the time it would take for money to lose 90% of its value (301-day rolling average, inverted logarithmic scale)

In economics, hyperinflation is a very high and typically accelerating inflation. It quickly erodes the real value of the local currency, as the prices of all goods increase. This causes people to minimize their holdings in that currency as they usually switch to more stable foreign currencies. Effective capital controls and currency substitution ("dollarization") are the orthodox solutions to ending short-term hyperinflation; however, there are significant social and economic costs to these policies. Ineffective implementations of these solutions often exacerbate the situation. Many governments choose to attempt to solve structural issues without resorting to those solutions, with the goal of bringing inflation down slowly while minimizing social costs of further economic shocks; however, this can lead to a prolonged period of high inflation.

Unlike low inflation, where the process of rising prices is protracted and not generally noticeable except by studying past market prices, hyperinflation sees a rapid and continuing increase in nominal prices, the nominal cost of goods, and in the supply of currency. Typically, however, the general price level rises even more rapidly than the money supply as people try ridding themselves of the devaluing currency as quickly as possible. As this happens, the real stock of money (i.e., the amount of circulating money divided by the price level) decreases considerably.

Hyperinflation is often associated with some stress to the government budget, such as wars or their aftermath, sociopolitical upheavals, a collapse in aggregate supply or one in export prices, or other crises that make it difficult for the government to collect tax revenue. A sharp decrease in real tax revenue coupled with a strong need to maintain government spending, together with an inability or unwillingness to borrow, can lead a country into hyperinflation.

== Definition ==
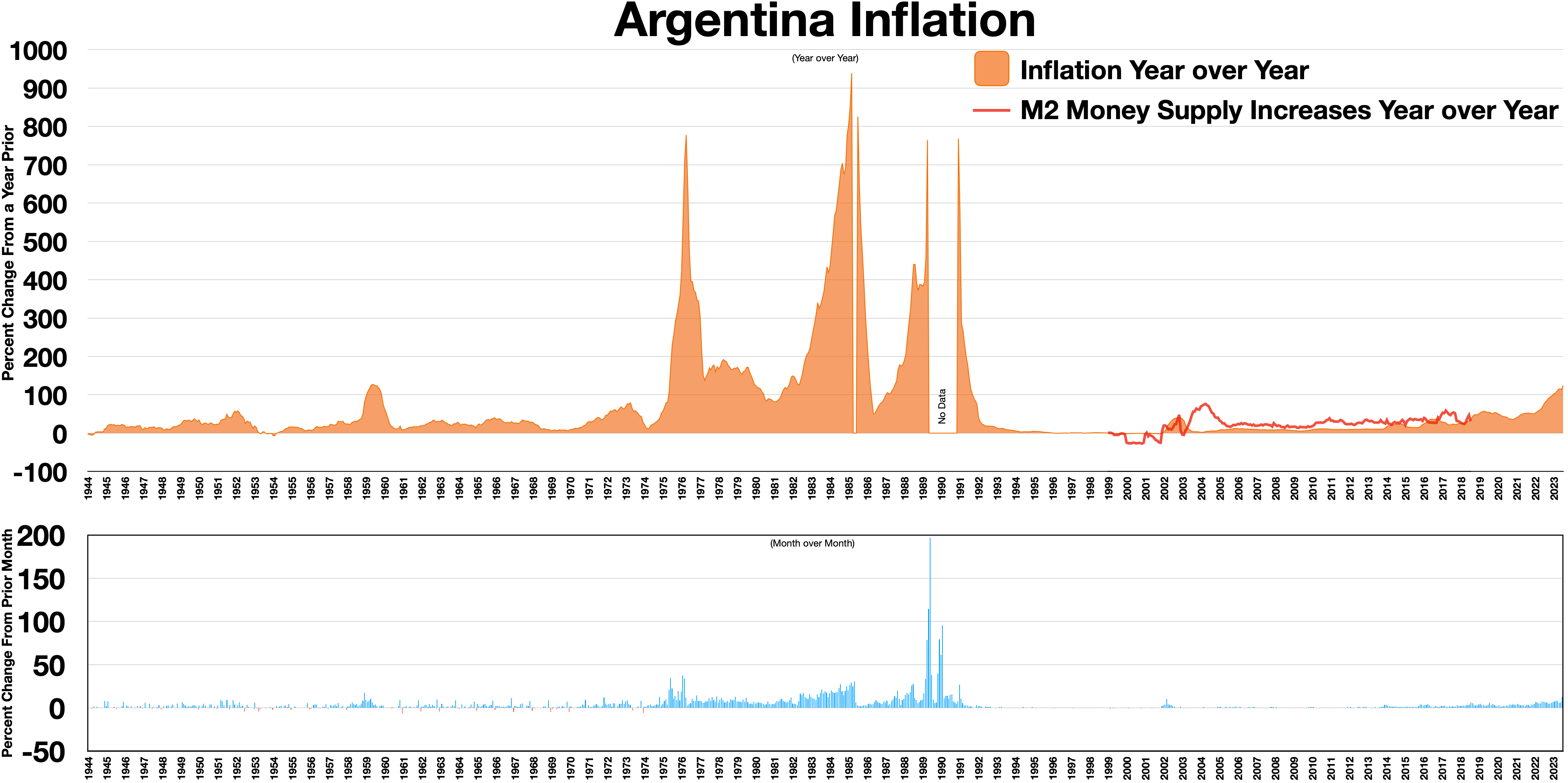
Argentina monthly inflation of over 50% in 1989 and 1990 Year-over-year inflation M2 money supply increases year over year Month-over-month inflation

In 1956, Columbia University economics professor Phillip Cagan wrote The Monetary Dynamics of Hyperinflation, often regarded as the first serious study of hyperinflation and its effects (though The Economics of Inflation by C. Bresciani-Turroni on the German hyperinflation was published in Italian in 1931). In this work, Cagan defined a hyperinflationary episode as starting in the month that the monthly inflation rate exceeds 50%, and as ending when the monthly inflation rate drops below 50% and stays that way for at least a year. Economists usually follow Cagan's description that hyperinflation occurs when the monthly inflation rate exceeds 50% (accumulating to a yearly increase of 12,874.63%, or an increase by a factor of 129.7463).

The International Accounting Standards Board has issued guidance on accounting rules in a hyperinflationary environment. It does not establish an absolute rule on when hyperinflation arises, but instead lists factors that indicate the existence of hyperinflation:

- The general population prefers to keep its wealth in non-monetary assets or in a relatively stable foreign currency. Amounts of local currency held are immediately invested to maintain purchasing power;
- The general population regards monetary amounts not in terms of the local currency but in terms of a relatively stable foreign currency. Prices may be quoted in that currency;
- Sales and purchases on credit take place at prices that compensate for the expected loss of purchasing power during the credit period, even if the period is short;
- Interest rates, wages, and prices are linked to a price index; and
- The cumulative inflation rate over three years approaches, or exceeds, 100%.

== Causes ==
While there can be a number of causes of moderate inflation, almost all hyperinflations have been caused by government budget deficits financed by currency creation. Peter Bernholz analysed 29 hyperinflations (following Cagan's definition) and concludes that at least 25 of them have been caused in this way. A necessary condition for hyperinflation is the use of paper money instead of gold or silver coins. Most hyperinflations in history, with some exceptions, such as the French hyperinflation of 1789–1796, occurred after the use of fiat currency became widespread in the late 19th century. The French hyperinflation took place after the introduction of a non-convertible paper currency, the assignat.

=== Money supply ===
Monetarist theories hold that hyperinflation occurs when there is a continuing (and often accelerating) rapid increase in the amount of money that is not supported by a corresponding growth in the output of goods and services.

The increases in price that can result from rapid money creation can create a vicious circle, requiring ever growing amounts of new money creation to fund government deficits. Hence both monetary inflation and price inflation proceed at a rapid pace. Such rapidly increasing prices cause widespread unwillingness of the local population to hold the local currency as it rapidly loses its buying power. Instead, they quickly spend any money they receive, which increases the velocity of money flow; this in turn causes further acceleration in prices. This means that the increase in the price level is greater than that of the money supply.

This results in an imbalance between the supply and demand for the money (including currency and bank deposits), causing rapid inflation. Very high inflation rates can result in a loss of confidence in the currency, similar to a bank run. The excessive money supply growth can result from speculating by private borrowers, or may result from the government being either unable or unwilling to fully finance the government budget through taxation or borrowing. The government may instead finance a government deficit through the creation of money.

Governments have sometimes resorted to excessively loose monetary policy, as it allows a government to devalue its debts and reduce (or avoid) tax increases. Monetary inflation is effectively a flat tax on creditors that also redistributes proportionally to private debtors. Distributional effects of monetary inflation are complex and vary based on the situation, with some models finding regressive effects but other empirical studies progressive effects. As a form of tax, it is less overt than levied taxes and is therefore harder to understand by ordinary citizens. Inflation can obscure quantitative assessments of the true cost of living, as published price indices only look at data in retrospect, so may increase only months later. Monetary inflation can become hyperinflation if monetary authorities fail to fund increasing government expenses from taxes, government debt, cost cutting, or by other means, because either

- during the time between recording or levying taxable transactions and collecting the taxes due, the value of the taxes collected falls in real value to a small fraction of the original taxes receivable; or
- government debt issues fail to find buyers except at very deep discounts; or
- a combination of the above.

Theories of hyperinflation generally look for a relationship between seigniorage and the inflation tax. In both Cagan's model and the neo-classical models, a tipping point occurs when the increase in money supply or the drop in the monetary base makes it impossible for a government to improve its financial position. Thus when fiat money is printed, government obligations that are not denominated in money increase in cost by more than the value of the money created.

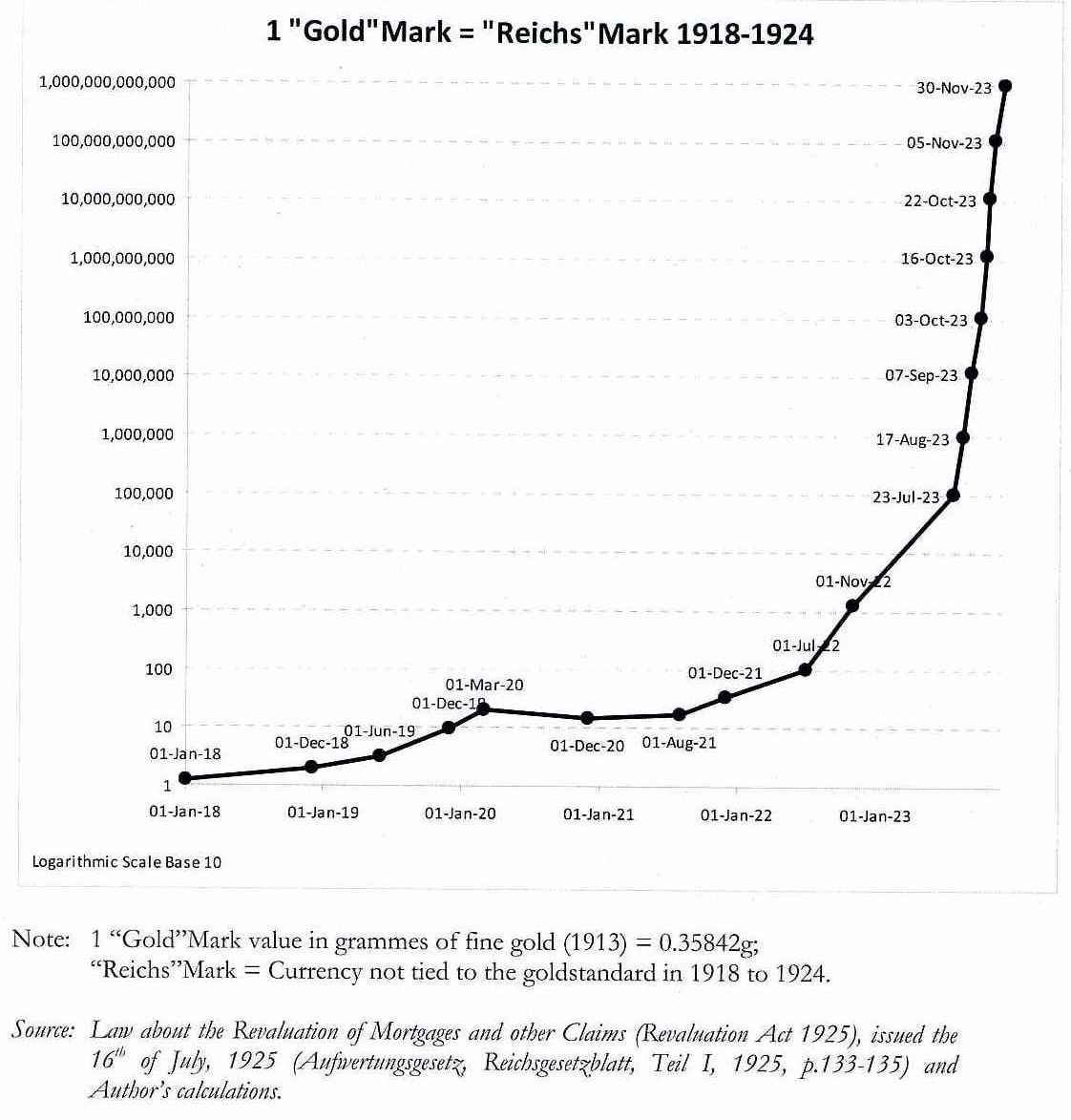
The price of gold in Germany, 1 January 1918 – 30 November 1923. (The vertical scale is logarithmic.)

In neo-classical economic theory, hyperinflation is rooted in a deterioration of the monetary base, that is the confidence that there is a store of value that the currency will be able to command later. In this model, the perceived risk of holding currency rises dramatically, and sellers demand increasingly high premiums to accept the currency. This in turn leads to a greater fear that the currency will collapse, causing even higher premiums. One example of this is during periods of warfare, civil war, or intense internal conflict of other kinds: governments need to do whatever is necessary to continue fighting, since the alternative is defeat. Expenses cannot be cut significantly since the main outlay is armaments. Further, a civil war may make it difficult to raise taxes or to collect existing taxes. While in peacetime the deficit is financed by selling bonds, during a war it is typically difficult and expensive to borrow, especially if the war is going poorly for the government in question. The banking authorities, whether central or not, "monetize" the deficit, printing money to pay for the government's efforts to survive. The hyperinflation under the Chinese Nationalists from 1939 to 1945 is a classic example of a government printing money to pay civil war costs. By the end, currency was flown in over the Himalayas, and then old currency was flown out to be destroyed.

Hyperinflation is a complex phenomenon, and one explanation may not be applicable to all cases. In both of these models, however, whether loss of confidence comes first, or central bank seigniorage, the other phase is ignited. In the case of rapid expansion of the money supply, prices rise rapidly in response to the increased supply of money relative to the supply of goods and services, and in the case of loss of confidence, the monetary authority responds to the risk premiums it has to pay by "running the printing presses".

=== Supply shocks ===
A number of hyperinflations were caused by some sort of extreme negative supply shock, sometimes but not always associated with wars or natural disasters.

== Effects ==
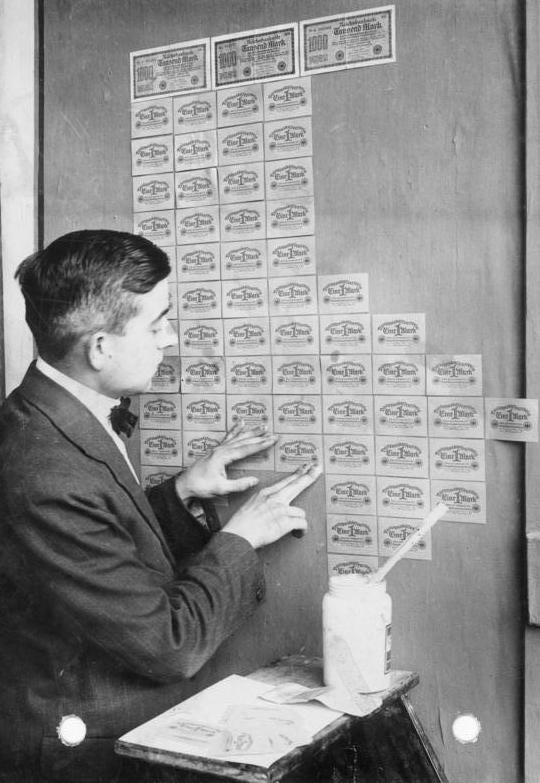
Germany, 1923: banknotes had lost so much value that they were used as wallpaper.

Hyperinflation increases market prices, wipes out the purchasing power of private and public savings, distorts the economy in favor of the hoarding of real assets, causes the monetary base (whether specie or hard currency) to flee the country, and makes the afflicted area anathema to investment.

One of the most important characteristics of hyperinflation is the accelerating substitution of the inflating money by stable money—gold and silver in former times, then relatively stable foreign currencies after the breakdown of the gold or silver standards (Thiers' law). If inflation is high enough, government regulations like heavy penalties and fines, often combined with exchange controls, cannot prevent this currency substitution. As a consequence, the inflating currency is usually heavily undervalued compared to stable foreign money in terms of purchasing power parity. So, foreigners can live cheaply and buy at low prices in the countries hit by high inflation. It follows that governments that do not succeed in engineering a successful currency reform in time must finally legalize the stable foreign currencies (or, formerly, gold and silver) that threaten to fully substitute the inflating money. Otherwise, their tax revenues, including the inflation tax, will approach zero. The last episode of hyperinflation in which this process could be observed was in Zimbabwe in the first decade of the 21st century. In this case, the local money was mainly driven out by the US dollar and the South African rand.

Enactment of price controls to prevent discounting the value of paper money relative to gold, silver, hard currency, or other commodities fail to force acceptance of a paper money that lacks intrinsic value. If the entity responsible for printing a currency promotes excessive money printing, with other factors contributing a reinforcing effect, hyperinflation usually continues. Hyperinflation is generally associated with paper money, which can easily be used to increase the money supply: add more zeros to the plates and print or even stamp old notes with new numbers.

Much attention on hyperinflation centres on the effect on savers whose investments become worthless. Interest rate changes often cannot keep up with hyperinflation or even high inflation, certainly with contractually fixed interest rates. For example, in the 1970s in the United Kingdom inflation reached 25% per annum, yet interest rates did not rise above 15%—and then only briefly—and many fixed interest rate loans existed. Contractually, there is often no bar to a debtor clearing his long-term debt with "hyperinflated cash", nor could a lender simply somehow suspend the loan. Contractual "early redemption penalties" were (and still are) often based on a penalty of n months of interest/payment; again, no real bar to paying off what had been a large loan. In interwar Germany, for example, much private and corporate debt was effectively wiped out—certainly for those holding fixed interest rate loans.

As more and more money is provided, interest rates decline towards zero. Realizing that fiat money is losing value, investors will try to place money in assets such as real estate, stocks, or even art as these appear to represent "real" value. Asset prices are thus becoming inflated. This potentially spiralling process will ultimately lead to the collapse of the monetary system. The Cantillon effect says that those institutions that receive the new money first are the beneficiaries of the policy.

=== Aftermath ===
Hyperinflation is usually ended by using drastic remedies, such as imposing the shock therapy of slashing government expenditures or altering the currency basis. One form this may take is dollarization, the use of a foreign currency (not necessarily the U.S. dollar) as a national unit of currency. An example was dollarization in Ecuador, initiated in September 2000 in response to a 75% loss of value of the Ecuadorian sucre in early 2000. Usually the "dollarization" takes place in spite of all efforts of the government to prevent it by exchange controls, heavy fines and penalties. The government has thus to try to engineer a successful currency reform stabilizing the value of the money. If it does not succeed with this reform the substitution of the inflating by stable money goes on. Thus, it is not surprising that there have been at least seven historical cases in which the good (foreign) money did fully drive out the use of the inflating currency. In the end, the government had to legalize the former, for otherwise its revenues would have fallen to zero.

Hyperinflation has always been a traumatic experience for the people who suffer it, and the next political regime almost always enacts policies to try to prevent its recurrence. Often this means making the central bank very aggressive about maintaining price stability, as was the case with the German Bundesbank, or moving to some hard basis of currency, such as a currency board. Many governments have enacted extremely stiff wage and price controls in the wake of hyperinflation, but this does not prevent further inflation of the money supply by the central bank and always leads to widespread shortages of consumer goods if the controls are rigidly enforced.

=== Currency ===
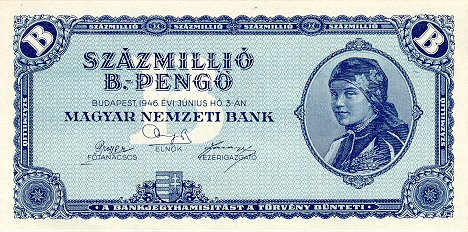
100 million trillion pengő (100 quintillion pengő) banknote from the period of postwar hyperinflation in Hungary in 1946, the largest denomination banknote ever officially issued for circulation

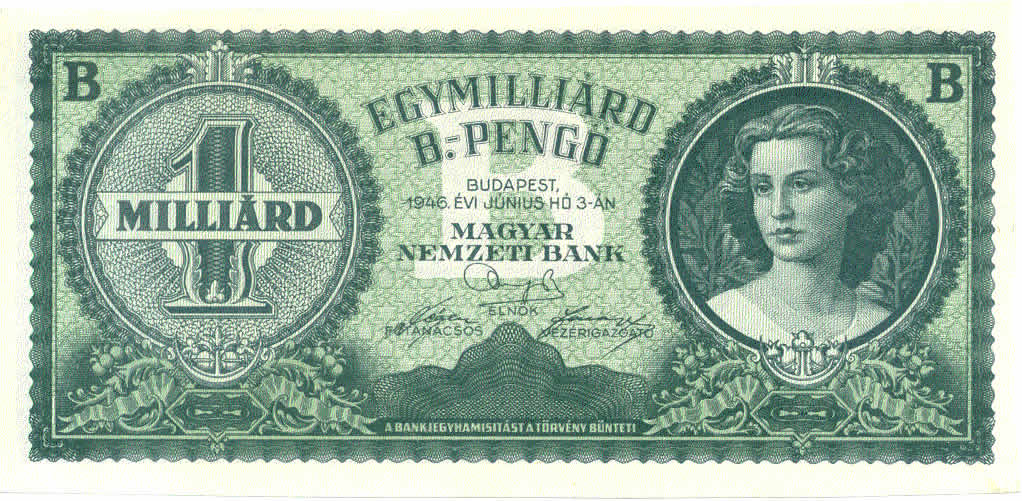
1 milliard b.-pengő (1 sextillion pengő) banknote, printed but never issued

In countries experiencing hyperinflation, the central bank often prints money in larger and larger denominations as the smaller denomination notes become worthless. This can result in the production of unusually large denominations of banknotes, including those denominated in amounts of 1,000,000,000 (10^{9}, 1 billion) or more.

- By late 1923, the Weimar Republic of Germany was issuing two-trillion-mark banknotes and postage stamps with a face value of fifty billion marks. The highest value banknote issued by the Weimar government's Reichsbank had a face value of 100 trillion marks (10^{14}; 100,000,000,000,000; 100 million million). At the height of the inflation, one US dollar was worth 4 trillion German marks. One of the firms printing these notes submitted an invoice for the work to the Reichsbank for 32,776,899,763,734,490,417.05 (3.28 × 10^{19}, roughly 33 quintillion) marks.
- The largest denomination banknote ever officially issued for circulation was in 1946 by the Hungarian National Bank for the amount of 100 quintillion pengő (10^{20}; 100,000,000,000,000,000,000; 100 million million million). (A banknote worth 10 times as much, 10^{21} (1 sextillion) pengő, was printed but not issued.) The banknotes did not show the numbers in full: "hundred million b.-pengő" ("hundred million trillion pengő") and "one milliard b.-pengő" were spelled out instead. This makes the 100,000,000,000,000 Zimbabwean dollar banknotes the note with the greatest number of zeros shown.
- The Post-World War II hyperinflation of Hungary held the record for the most extreme monthly inflation rate ever – 41.9 quadrillion percent (4.19×10^{16}%; 41,900,000,000,000,000%) for July 1946, amounting to prices doubling every 15.3 hours. By comparison, on 14 November 2008, Zimbabwe's annual inflation rate was estimated to be 89.7 sextillion (10^{21}) percent. The highest monthly inflation rate of that period was 79.6 billion percent (7.96×10^{10}%; 79,600,000,000%), and a doubling time of 24.7 hours.

One way to avoid the use of large numbers is by declaring a new unit of currency. (As an example, instead of 10,000,000,000 dollars, a central bank might set 1 new dollar = 1,000,000,000 old dollars, so the new note would read "10 new dollars".) One example of this is Turkey's revaluation of the lira on 1 January 2005, when the old Turkish lira (TRL) was converted to the new Turkish lira (TRY) at a rate of 1,000,000 old to 1 new lira. While this does not lessen the actual value of a currency, it is called redenomination or revaluation and also occasionally happens in countries with lower inflation rates. During hyperinflation, currency inflation happens so quickly that bills reach large numbers before revaluation.

Governments may try to disguise the true rate of inflation through a variety of techniques. If these actions do not address the root causes of inflation they may undermine trust in the currency, causing further increases in inflation. Price controls will generally result in shortages and hoarding and extremely high demand for the controlled goods, causing disruptions of supply chains. Products available to consumers may diminish or disappear as businesses no longer find it economic to continue producing and/or distributing such goods at the legal prices, further exacerbating the shortages.

There are also issues with computerized money-handling systems. In Zimbabwe, during the hyperinflation of the Zimbabwe dollar, many automated teller machines and payment card machines struggled with arithmetic overflow errors as customers required many billions and trillions of dollars at one time.

== Notable hyperinflationary periods ==
=== Argentina ===
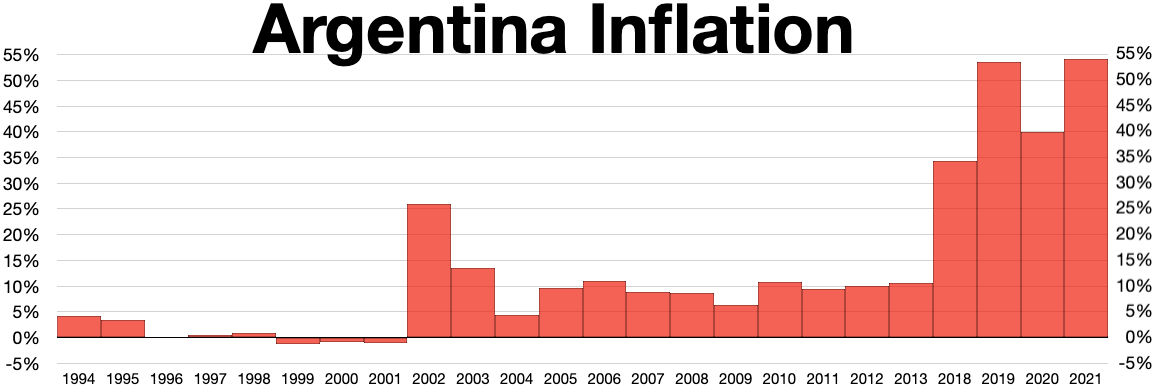
Argentina inflation 1994–2021

Since the late 2010s, inflation has been a constant problem for the economy of Argentina, with an annual rate of 25% in 2017, second only to Venezuela in South America and the highest in the G20. On 28 December, the Central Bank of Argentina together with the Treasury announced a change of the inflation target. The Central Bank attempted to reduce it to 15%, by adjusting its interest rates but these efforts only managed to stop further inflation rather than reduce it. An intense drought, ranking among the world's worst natural disasters in 2018, reduced the production of soy and dried up tax revenue.

Later in 2018, the Federal Reserve of the United States increased interest rates from 0.25% to 1.75% and then 2%. This caused investors to return to the United States, leaving emerging markets. The effect, a rise in the price of the United States dollar, was modest in most countries, but it was felt particularly strongly in Argentina, Brazil and Turkey. Despite the high-interest rates and IMF support, investors feared that the country might fall into a sovereign default once again, especially if another administration were to be voted in during the next election cycle, and started pulling out investments. All those factors led to a dramatic increase in the price of the US dollar in Argentina. The Central Bank increased the interest rate again, to 60%, but could not keep up.

Macri announced on 8 May 2018 that Argentina would seek a loan from the International Monetary Fund (IMF). The initial loan was $50 billion, and the country pledged to reduce inflation and public spending. Federico Sturzenegger, the president of the Central Bank of Argentina, resigned a week later, alongside much of its senior staff. Macri replaced him with Luis Caputo, and merged the ministries of treasury and finances into a single ministry, led by Nicolás Dujovne. The Turkish currency and debt crisis caused yet another increase on the price of the dollar. The tariffs on soy exports were restored, as a result of the crisis. Caputo resigned for personal reasons, and Guido Sandleris was appointed as president of the Central Bank. The IMF expanded the loan with an extra 7 billion U.S. dollars, the largest loan in IMF history. In exchange, the Central Bank would operate on the price of the dollar only when it surpassed certain requirements. The national budget for 2019 reduced the deficit, which was 2.6 percent of GDP in 2018, to zero, and estimated that inflation would decrease from 44% to 23%. This budget was approved by the Congress, despite demonstrations and Kirchnerist rejection.

In the 2019 presidential election, Néstor Kirchner's former Chief of the Cabinet of Ministers Alberto Fernández was elected president. The new peronist administration immediately refused to take the remaining $11 billion of the loan, arguing that it was no longer obliged to adhere to the IMF conditions. The value of the peso continued to plummet as foreign investors pulled out and the COVID-19 pandemic hit the country in early 2020. Fernández soon brought back some of Cristina Kirchner's more criticized economic policies, often expanding on them. This included extremely tight control on all currency exchange operations, which involved setting a maximum exchange of $200 US dollars per month for all citizens, imposing a new 35% tax on all foreign currency exchange operations, and artificially freezing the official exchange rate. By September 2020. the government had severely restricted most exchange operations, especially for those citizens without stable incomes. These measures caused the underground foreign exchange market to come back to life, despite efforts made by the previous Macri's administration to stamp it out, further weakening Argentina's control over its economy. In 2022, Argentina's inflation rate reached 100%, and in November 2023 reached 143%, with 55% of children in Argentina living below the poverty line and more than 18 million citizens not being able to afford basic goods as of 2023. When Javier Milei was elected to the office of president in December 2023, his main election promise was to initiate a libertarian recovery economic plan to mitigate the economic crisis and restore the Argentinean economy to normalcy. In January 2024, after a series of economic shock measures were introduced, inflation reached a 32-year high at 211%. President Milei has also announced sweeping cuts in government including attempting to eliminate a large portion of the government ministries.

=== Austria ===
Hanke Krus Hyperinflation Table that lists 56 episodes of hyperinflation (following Cagan's definition)

In 1922, inflation in Austria reached 1,426%, and from 1914 to January 1923, the consumer price index rose by a factor of 11,836, with the highest banknote in denominations of 500,000 Kronen. (Note: A banknote with a value of one million krones was printed, but not issued.) After World War I, essentially all State enterprises ran at a loss, and the number of state employees in the capital, Vienna, was greater than in the earlier monarchy, even though the new republic was nearly one-eighth of the size.

Observing the Austrian response to developing hyperinflation, which included the hoarding of food and the speculation in foreign currencies, Owen S. Phillpotts, the Commercial Secretary at the British Legation in Vienna wrote: "The Austrians are like men on a ship who cannot manage it, and are continually signalling for help. While waiting, however, most of them begin to cut rafts, each for himself, out of the sides and decks. The ship has not yet sunk despite the leaks so caused, and those who have acquired stores of wood in this way may use them to cook their food, while the more seamanlike look on cold and hungry. The population lack courage and energy as well as patriotism."

- Start and end date: October 1921 – September 1923
- Peak month and rate of inflation: August 1922, 129%

=== Bolivia ===
Increasing hyperinflation in Bolivia has plagued, and at times crippled, its economy and currency since the 1970s. At one time in 1985, the country experienced an annual inflation rate of more than 20,000%. Fiscal and monetary reform reduced the inflation rate to single digits by the 1990s, and in 2004 Bolivia experienced a manageable 4.9% rate of inflation.

In 1987, the peso boliviano was replaced by the new boliviano at a rate of one million to one (when 1 US dollar was worth 1.8–1.9 million pesos bolivianos). At that time, 1 new boliviano was roughly equivalent to 52 U.S. cents.

=== Brazil ===
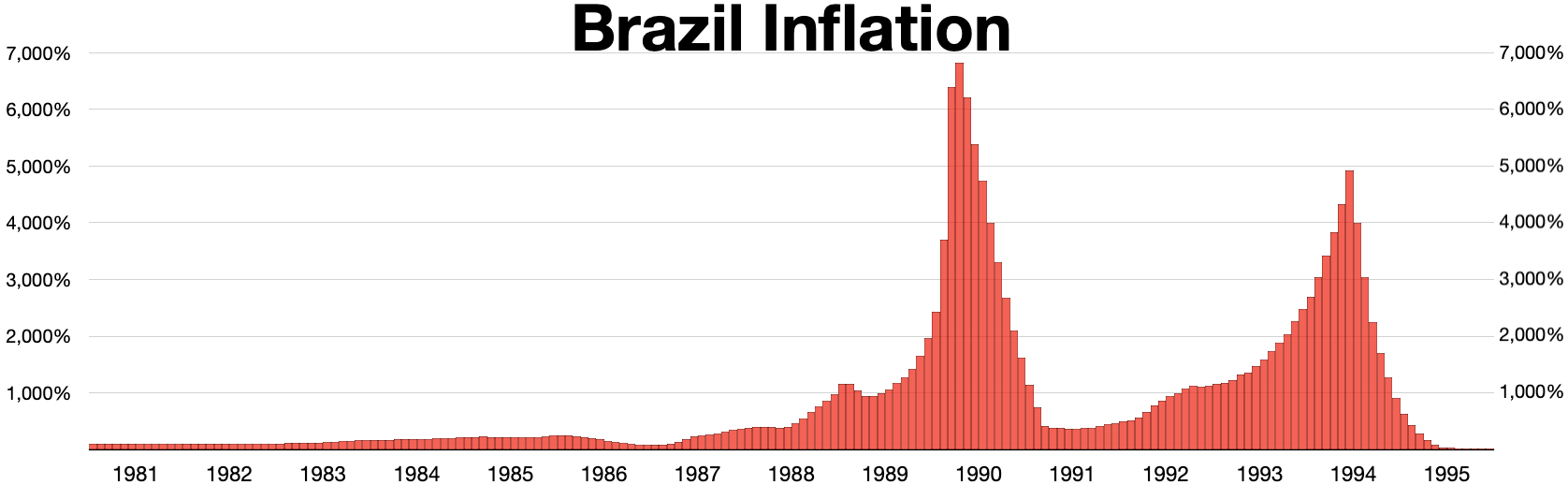
Brazil Inflation 1981-1995

Brazilian hyperinflation lasted from 1985 (the year when the military dictatorship ended) to 1994, with prices rising by 184,901,570,954.39% (or 1.849×10^{11} percent; equivalent to a tenfold increase on average a year) in that time amid persistent fiscal deficits, monetary expansion, and weak institutional arrangements. There were many economic plans that tried to contain hyperinflation including zeroes cuts, price freezes and even confiscation of bank accounts.

The highest value was in March 1990, when the government inflation index reached 82.39%. Hyperinflation ended in July 1994 with the Real Plan during the government of Itamar Franco. During the period of inflation Brazil adopted a total of six different currencies, as the government constantly changed due to rapid devaluation and increase in the number of zeros.

- Start and end date: January 1985 – mid-July 1994
- Peak month and rate of inflation: March 1990, 82.39%

=== China ===
Hyperinflation was a major factor in the collapse of the Nationalist government of Chiang Kai-shek.

After a brief decrease following the defeat of Japan in the Second Sino-Japanese War, hyperinflation resumed in October 1945. From 1948 to 1949, near the end of the Chinese Civil War, the Republic of China went through a period of hyperinflation. In 1947, the highest denomination bill was 50,000 yuan. By mid-1948, the highest denomination was 180,000,000 yuan.

In October 1948, the Nationalist government replaced its Fabi currency with the gold yuan. The gold yuan deteriorated even faster than the Fabi had.

1. First episode:
  - Start and end date: July 1943 – August 1945
  - Peak month and rate of inflation: June 1945, 302%
2. Second episode:
  - Start and end date: October 1947 – mid May 1949
  - Peak month and rate of inflation: April 5,070%

The Communists gained significant legitimacy by defeating hyperinflation in the late 1940s and early 1950s. Their development of state trading agencies reintegrated markets and trading networks, ultimately stabilizing prices.

=== France ===
During the French Revolution and first Republic, the National Assembly issued bonds, some backed by seized church property, called assignats. Napoleon replaced them with the franc in 1803, at which time the assignats were basically worthless. Stephen D. Dillaye pointed out that one of the reasons for the failure was massive counterfeiting of the paper currency, largely through London. According to Dillaye: "Seventeen manufacturing establishments were in full operation in London, with a force of four hundred men devoted to the production of false and forged Assignats."

- Start and end date: May 1795 – November 1796
- Peak month and rate of inflation: mid-August 1796, 304%

=== Germany (Weimar Republic) ===
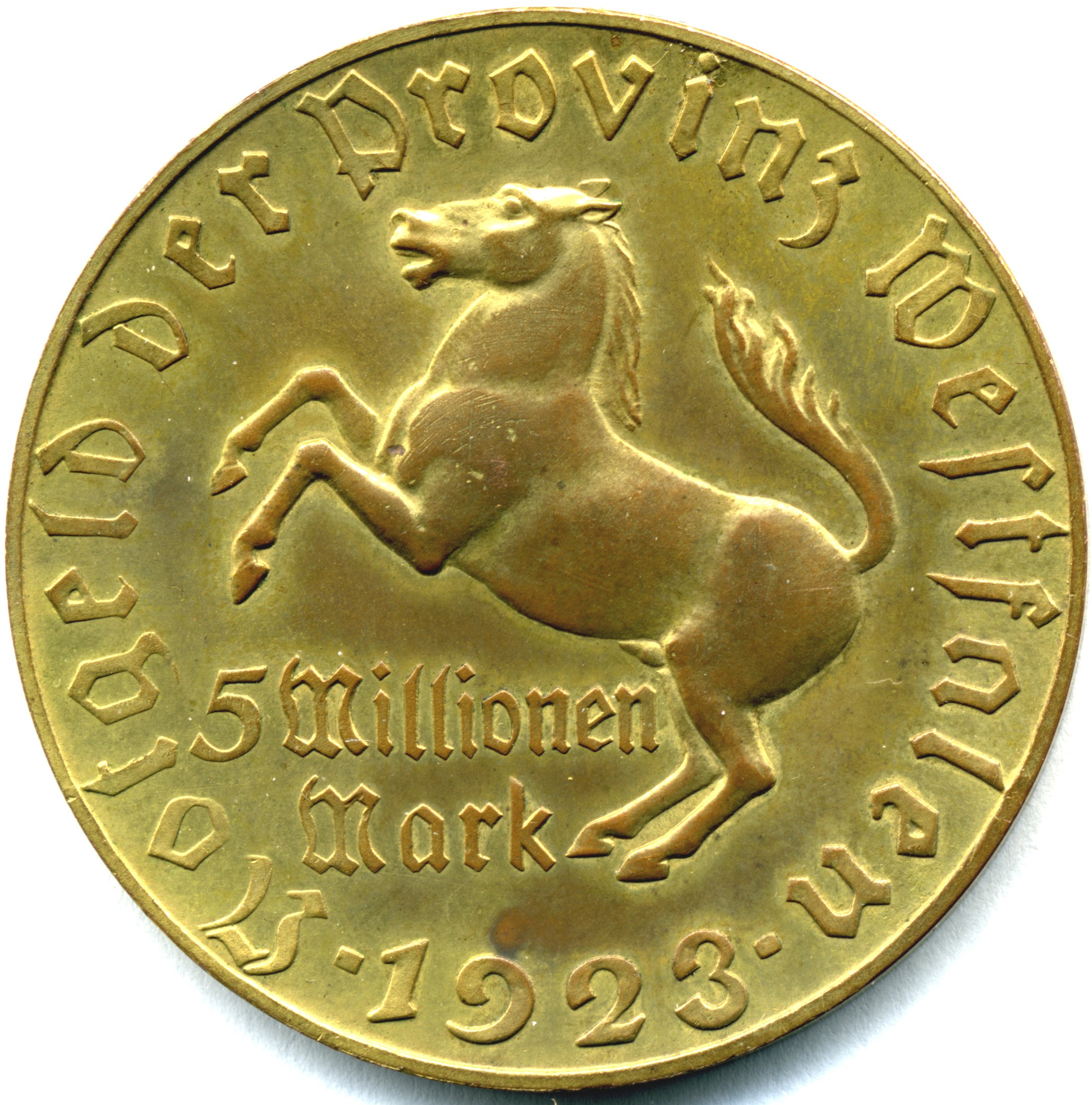
5 million marks would have been worth $714.29 in January 1923, but was only worth about one-thousandth of one cent by October 1923.

By November 1922, the value in gold of money in circulation had fallen from £300 million before World War I to £20 million. The Reichsbank responded by the unlimited printing of notes, thereby accelerating the devaluation of the mark. In his report to London, Lord D'Abernon wrote: "In the whole course of history, no dog has ever run after its own tail with the speed of the Reichsbank." Germany went through its worst inflation in 1923. In 1922, the highest denomination was 50,000ℳ. By 1923, the highest denomination was 100,000,000,000,000ℳ (10^{14} marks). In December 1923 the exchange rate was 4,200,000,000,000ℳ (4.2×10^{12} marks) to 1 US dollar. In 1923, the rate of inflation hit 3.25×10^{6} percent per month (prices double every two days). Beginning on 20 November 1923, 1,000,000,000,000ℳ (10^{12}ℳ, 1 trillion marks) were exchanged for 1 Rentenmark, so that RM 4.2 was worth 1 US dollar, exactly the same rate the mark had in 1914.

1. First phase:
  - Start and end date: January 1920 – January 1920
  - Peak month and rate of inflation: January 1920, 56.9%
2. Second phase:
  - Start and end date: August 1922 – December 1923
  - Peak month and rate of inflation: November 1923, 29,525%

=== Greece (German–Italian occupation) ===
With the German invasion in April 1941, there was an abrupt increase in prices. This was due to psychological factors related to the fear of shortages and to the hoarding of goods. During the German and Italian Axis occupation of Greece (1941–1944), the agricultural, mineral, industrial etc. production of Greece were used to sustain the occupation forces, but also to secure provisions for the Afrika Korps. One part of these "sales" of provisions was settled with bilateral clearing through the German DEGRIGES and the Italian Sagic companies at very low prices. As the value of Greek exports in drachmas fell, the demand for drachmas followed suit and so did its forex rate. While shortages started due to naval blockades and hoarding, the prices of commodities soared. The other part of the "purchases" was settled with drachmas secured from the Bank of Greece and printed for this purpose by private printing presses. As prices soared, the Germans and Italians started requesting more and more drachmas from the Bank of Greece to offset price increases; each time prices increased, the note circulation followed suit soon afterwards. For the year starting November 1943, the inflation rate was 2.5×10^{10}%, the circulation was 6.28×10^{18} drachmae and one gold sovereign cost 43,167 billion drachmas. The hyperinflation started subsiding immediately after the departure of the German occupation forces, but inflation rates took several years to fall below 50%.

- Start and end date: June 1941 – January 1946
- Peak month and rate of inflation: December 1944, 3.0×10^{10}%

=== Hungary ===
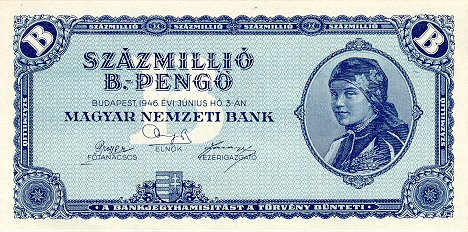
The 100 million b.-P note was the highest denomination of banknote ever issued, worth 10^{20}P, or 100 quintillion pengoes (1946). B.-pengő was short for "billió pengő", equal to 1 trillion pengő (10^{12}P).

The Treaty of Trianon and political instability between 1919 and 1924 led to a major inflation of Hungary's currency. In 1921, in an attempt to stop this inflation, the national assembly of Hungary passed the Hegedüs reforms, including a 20% levy on bank deposits, but this precipitated a mistrust of banks by the public, especially the peasants, and resulted in a reduction in savings, and thus an increase in the amount of currency in circulation. Due to the reduced tax base, the government resorted to printing money, and in 1923 inflation in Hungary reached 98% per month.

Between the end of 1945 and July 1946, Hungary went through the highest inflation ever recorded. In 1944, the highest banknote value was 1,000 P. By the end of 1945, it was 10,000,000 P, and the highest value in mid-1946 was 100,000,000,000,000,000,000 P (10^{20} pengő). A special currency, the adópengő (or tax pengő) was created for tax and postal payments. The inflation was such that the value of the adópengő was adjusted each day by radio announcement. On 1 January 1946, one adópengő equalled one pengő, but by late July, one adópengő equalled 2,000,000,000,000,000,000,000 P or 2×10^{21} P (2 sextillion pengő).

When the pengő was replaced in August 1946 by the forint, the total value of all Hungarian banknotes in circulation amounted to 1/1,000 of one US cent. Inflation had peaked at 1.3×10^{16}% per month (i.e. prices doubled every 15.6 hours). On 18 August 1946, 400,000,000,000,000,000,000,000,000,000 P (4×10^{29} pengő, or four hundred octillion on short scale) became 1 Ft.

- Start and end date: August 1945 – July 1946
- Peak month and rate of inflation: July 1946, 41.9×10^{15}%

=== Iran ===
After the end of Islamic Revolution of 1979, the Iranian rial has been steadily losing its value due to international sanctions and internal corruption. After the Iran hostage crisis, the United States has been imposing sanctions against Iran as a response. Before the toppling of the Shah, 70 rial was equalled one U.S. dollar and by July 1999, the U.S. dollar was valued to 9,430 rial.

More inflation happened in early 2020s when the rial lost five-fold of its value since last recorded in 2018 due to excessive money printing from the Central Bank of Iran. The rial value worsened after the Mahsa Amini protests in 2022 which make it lost 29% of its value. Following the 2024 geopolitical events such as Collapse of the Assad government and Donald Trump's return to the presidency in the 2024 election, one U.S. dollar has recorded to 820,500 Rial.

Toward the end of 2025, Iranians began taking to the street after the U.S dollar value had reached 1.45 million rial, before it briefly recovered to 1.38 million rial, losing 40 percent of its value. The inflation was said to be caused by Iran military overspending especially during the ongoing Iran–Israel conflict.

=== Indonesia ===
Indonesia experienced severe hyperinflation duting the final years of Sukarno's Guided Democracy. Inflation accelerated as persistent government budget deficits were increasingly financed through money creation. The money supply grew by 41.4% in 1961 and by 763.5% in 1966, while the annual inflation rate rose from 26.9% to 635.3% over the same period.

Academic accounts of the Indoenesian economy describe the episode as hyperinflation exceeding 600% in 1966.

Following the political transition to Suharto and the beginning of the New Order, the government introduced a stabilization programme centered on fiscal discipline, tighter control of the money supply and monetary policy reforms. Inflation subsequently fell sharply and reached about 10% by 1969.

=== Malaya and Singapore (Japanese occupation) ===
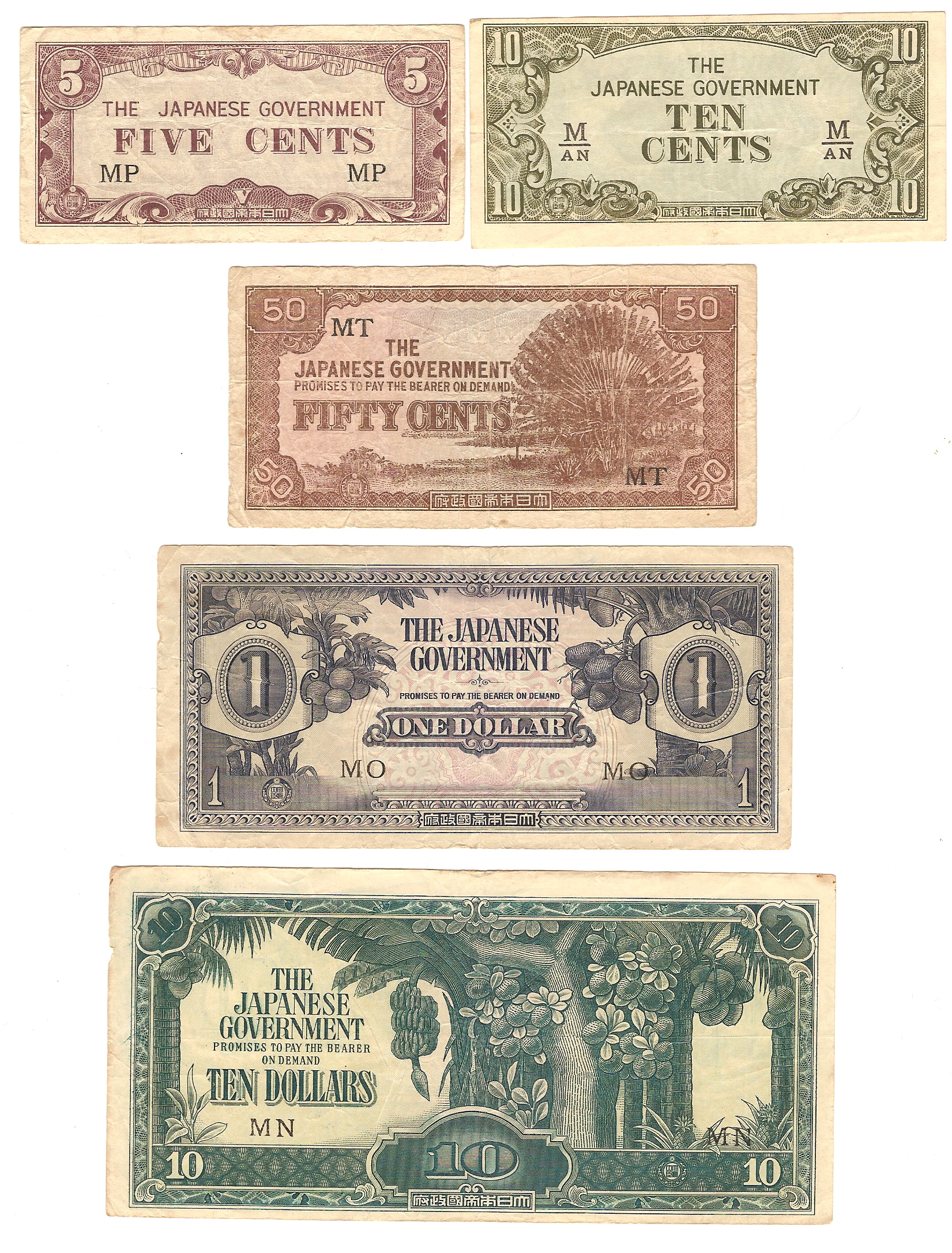
Banana banknotes issued by the Japanese Government during the occupation of Malaya. The term "banana notes" originates from the motif of banana trees on the currency's 10-dollar banknote.

Malaya and Singapore were under Japanese occupation from 1942 until 1945. The Japanese issued "banana notes" as the official currency to replace the Straits currency issued by the British. During that time, the cost of basic necessities increased drastically. As the occupation proceeded, the Japanese authorities printed more money to fund their wartime activities, which resulted in hyperinflation and a severe depreciation in value of the banana note.

From February to December 1942, $100 of Straits currency was worth $100 in Japanese scrip, after which the value of Japanese scrip began to erode, reaching $385 in December 1943 and $1,850 one year later. By 1 August 1945, this had inflated to $10,500, and 11 days later it had reached $95,000. After 13 August 1945, Japanese scrip had become valueless.

=== North Korea ===
North Korea most likely experienced hyperinflation from December 2009 to mid-January 2011. Based on the price of rice, North Korea's hyperinflation peaked in mid-January 2010, but according to black market exchange-rate data, and calculations based on purchasing power parity, North Korea experienced its peak month of inflation in early March 2010. These data points are unofficial, however, and therefore must be treated with a degree of caution.

=== Peru ===
In modern history, Peru underwent a period of hyperinflation in the 1980s to the early 1990s starting with President Fernando Belaúnde's second administration, heightened during Alan García's first administration, to the beginning of Alberto Fujimori's term. 1 US dollar was worth over S/3,210,000,000. Garcia's term introduced the inti, which worsened inflation into hyperinflation. Peru's currency and economy were stabilized under Fujimori's Nuevo Sol program, which has remained Peru's currency since 1991.

=== Poland ===
Poland has gone through two episodes of hyperinflation since the country regained independence following the end of World War I, the first in 1923, the second in 1989–1990. Both events resulted in the introduction of new currencies. In 1924, the złoty replaced the original currency of post-war Poland, the mark. This currency was subsequently replaced by another of the same name in 1950. As a result of the second hyperinflation crisis, the current new złoty was introduced in 1995 (ISO code: PLN).

The newly independent Poland had been struggling with a large budget deficit since its inception in 1918 but it was in 1923 when inflation reached its peak. The exchange rate of the Polish mark (Mp) to the US dollar dropped from Mp 9.— per dollar in 1918 to Mp 6,375,000. — per dollar at the end of 1923. A new personal 'inflation tax' was introduced. The resolution of the crisis is attributed to Władysław Grabski, who became prime minister of Poland in December 1923. Having nominated an all-new government and being granted extraordinary lawmaking powers by the Sejm for a period of six months, he introduced a new currency, the złoty ("golden" in Polish), established a new national bank and scrapped the inflation tax, which took place throughout 1924.

The economic crisis in Poland in the 1980s was accompanied by rising inflation when new money was printed to cover a budget deficit. Although inflation was not as acute as in 1920s, it is estimated that its annual rate reached around 600% in a period of over a year spanning parts of 1989 and 1990. The economy was stabilised by the adoption of the Balcerowicz Plan in 1989, named after the main author of the reforms, minister of finance Leszek Balcerowicz. The plan was largely inspired by the previous Grabski's reforms.

=== Philippines ===
The Japanese government occupying the Philippines during World War II issued fiat currencies for general circulation. The Japanese-sponsored Second Philippine Republic government led by Jose P. Laurel at the same time outlawed possession of other currencies, most especially "guerrilla money". The fiat money's lack of value earned it the derisive nickname "Mickey Mouse money". Survivors of the war often tell tales of bringing suitcases or bayong (native bags made of woven coconut or buri leaf strips) overflowing with Japanese-issued notes. Early on, 75 JIM pesos could buy one duck egg. In 1944, a box of matches cost more than 100 JIM pesos.

In 1942, the highest denomination available was ₱10. Before the end of the war, because of inflation, the Japanese government was forced to issue ₱100, ₱500, and ₱1,000 notes.

- Start and end date: January 1944 – December 1944
- Peak month and rate of inflation: January 1944, 60%

=== Soviet Union ===
A seven-year period of uncontrollable spiralling inflation occurred in the early Soviet Union, running from the earliest days of the Bolshevik Revolution in November 1917 to the reestablishment of the gold standard with the introduction of the chervonets as part of the New Economic Policy. The inflationary crisis effectively ended in March 1924 with the introduction of the so-called "gold Ruble" as the country's standard currency.

The early Soviet hyperinflationary period was marked by three successive re-denominations of its currency, in which "new Rubles" replaced old at the rates of 10,000:1 (1 January 1922), 100:1 (1 January 1923), and 50,000:1 (7 March 1924), respectively.

Between 1921 and 1922, inflation in the Soviet Union reached 213%.

=== Venezuela ===
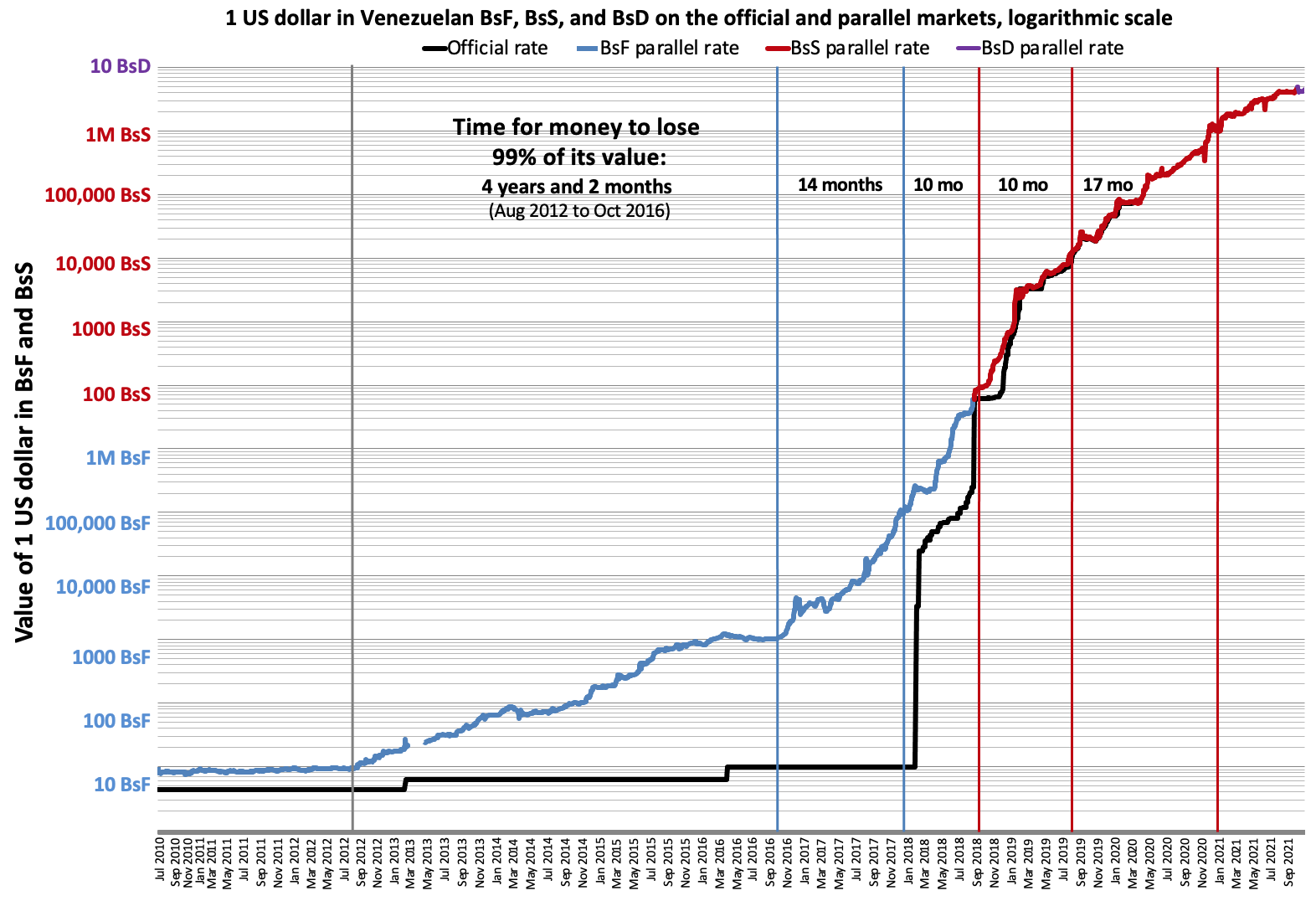
The value of one US dollar in Venezuelan bolivars on the black market through time, according to DolarToday.com. Blue and red vertical lines represent every time the currency has lost 99% of its value. This has happened almost five times since 2012, meaning that the currency is worth, as of November 2020, almost 1 billion times less than in August 2012.

Venezuela's hyperinflation began in November 2016. Inflation of Venezuela's bolivar Fuerte (VEF) in 2014 reached 69% and was the highest in the world. In 2015, inflation was 181%, the highest in the world and the highest in the country's history at that time, 800% in 2016, over 4,000% in 2017, and 1,698,488% in 2018, with Venezuela spiralling into hyperinflation. While the Venezuelan government "has essentially stopped" producing official inflation estimates as of early 2018, one estimate of the rate at that time was 5,220%, according to inflation economist Steve Hanke of Johns Hopkins University.

Inflation has affected Venezuelans so much that in 2017, some people became video game gold farmers and could be seen playing games such as RuneScape to sell in-game currency or characters for real currency. In many cases, these gamers made more money than salaried workers in Venezuela even though they were earning just a few dollars per day. During the Christmas season of 2017, some shops would no longer use price tags since prices would inflate so quickly, so customers were required to ask staff at stores, known as habladores ("talkers"), how much each item was. Some then further cut costs by replacing the "talkers" with computer screens.

The International Monetary Fund estimated in 2018 that Venezuela's inflation rate would reach 1,000,000% by the end of the year. This forecast was criticized by Steve H. Hanke, professor of applied economics at The Johns Hopkins University and senior fellow at the Cato Institute. According to Hanke, the IMF had released a "bogus forecast" because "no one has ever been able to accurately forecast the course or the duration of an episode of hyperinflation. But that has not stopped the IMF from offering inflation forecasts for Venezuela that have proven to be wildly inaccurate".

In July 2018, hyperinflation in Venezuela was sitting at 33,151%, "the 23rd most severe episode of hyperinflation in history".

In April 2019, the International Monetary Fund estimated that inflation would reach 10,000,000% by the end of 2019.

In May 2019, the Central Bank of Venezuela released economic data for the first time since 2015. According to this release, the inflation of Venezuela was 274% in 2016, 863% in 2017 and 130,060% in 2018. The annualised inflation rate as of April 2019 was estimated to be 282,972.8% as of April 2019, and cumulative inflation from 2016 to April 2019 was estimated at 53,798,500%.

The new reports imply a contraction of more than half of the economy in five years, according to the Financial Times "one of the biggest contractions in Latin American history". According to undisclosed sources from Reuters, the release of these numbers was due to pressure from China, a Maduro ally. One of these sources claims that the disclosure of economic numbers may bring Venezuela into compliance with the IMF, making it harder to support Juan Guaidó during the presidential crisis. At the time, the IMF was not able to support the validity of the data as they had not been able to contact the authorities.

- Start and end date: November 2016 – present
- Peak month and rate of inflation: April 2018, 234% (Hanke estimate); September 2018, 233% (National Assembly estimate)

=== Vietnam ===
Vietnam went through a period of chaos and high inflation in the late 1980s, with inflation peaking at 774% in 1988, after the country's "price-wage-currency" reform package, led by then-Deputy Prime Minister Trần Phương, had failed. High inflation also occurred in the early stages of the socialist-oriented market economic reforms commonly referred to as the Đổi Mới.

=== Yugoslavia ===
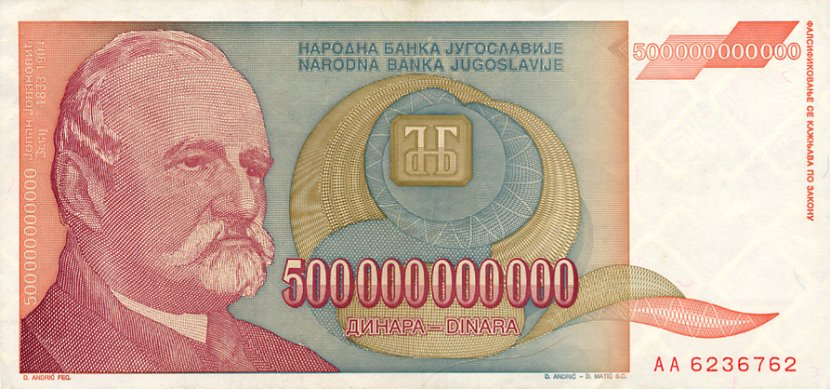
A 500 billion DIN banknote circa 1993, the largest nominal value ever officially printed in Yugoslavia, the final result of hyperinflation

Hyperinflation in the Socialist Federal Republic of Yugoslavia happened before and during the period of breakup of Yugoslavia, from 1989 to 1991. In April 1992, one of its successor states, FR Yugoslavia, entered a period of hyperinflation in the Federal Republic of Yugoslavia, that lasted until 1994. One of several regional conflicts accompanying the dissolution of Yugoslavia was the Bosnian War (1992–1995). The Belgrade government of Slobodan Milošević backed ethnic Serbian forces in the conflict, resulting in a United Nations boycott of Yugoslavia. The UN boycott collapsed an economy already weakened by regional war, with the projected monthly inflation rate accelerating to one million percent by December 1993 (prices double every 2.3 days).

The highest denomination in 1988 was 50,000 DIN. By 1989, it was 2,000,000 DIN. In the 1990 currency reform, 1 new dinar was exchanged for 10,000 old dinars. After socialist Yugoslavia broke up, the 1992 currency reform in FR Yugoslavia led to 1 new dinar being exchanged for 10 old dinars. The highest denomination in 1992 was 50,000 DIN. By 1993, it was 10,000,000,000 DIN. In the 1993 currency reform, 1 new dinar was exchanged for 1,000,000 old dinars. Before the year was over, however, the highest denomination was 500,000,000,000 dinars. In the 1994 currency reform, 1 new dinar was exchanged for 1,000,000,000 old dinars. In another currency reform a month later, 1 novi dinar was exchanged for 13 million dinars (1 novi dinar = 1 Deutschmark at the time of exchange). The overall impact of hyperinflation was that 1 novi dinar was equal to 1×10^{27} – 1.3×10^{27} pre-1990 dinars. FR Yugoslavia's rate of inflation hit 5×10^{15}% cumulative inflation over the time period 1 October 1993 and 24 January 1994.

1. SFR Yugoslavia:
  - Start and end date: September 1989 – December 1989
  - Peak month and rate of inflation: December 1989, 59.7%
2. FR Yugoslavia:
  - Start and end date: April 1992 – January 1994
  - Peak month and rate of inflation: January 1994, 3.13×10^{9}%

=== Zimbabwe ===
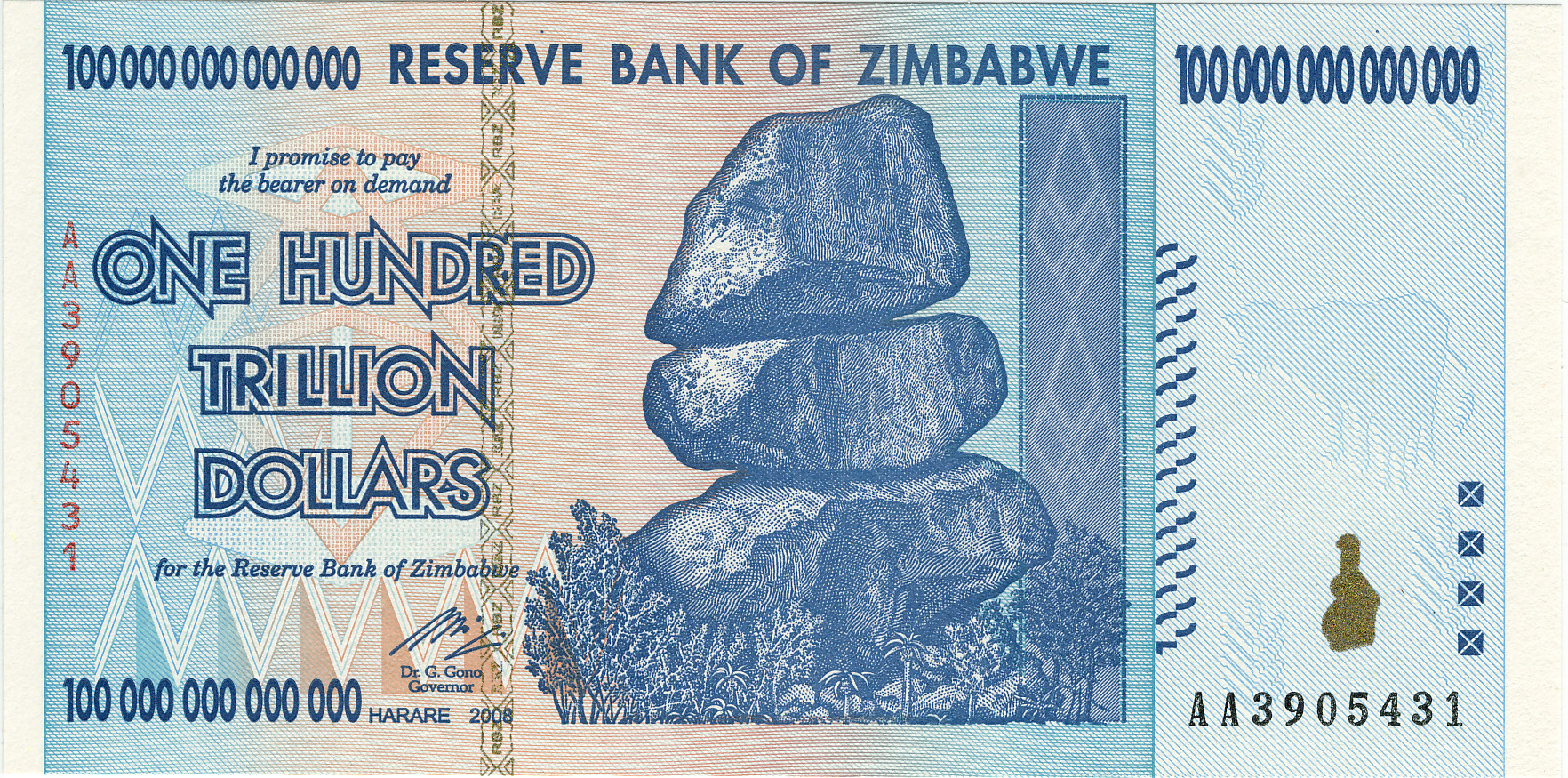
The Z$100 trillion banknote (Z$10^{14}), equal to Z$10^{27} (1 octillion) pre-2006 dollars

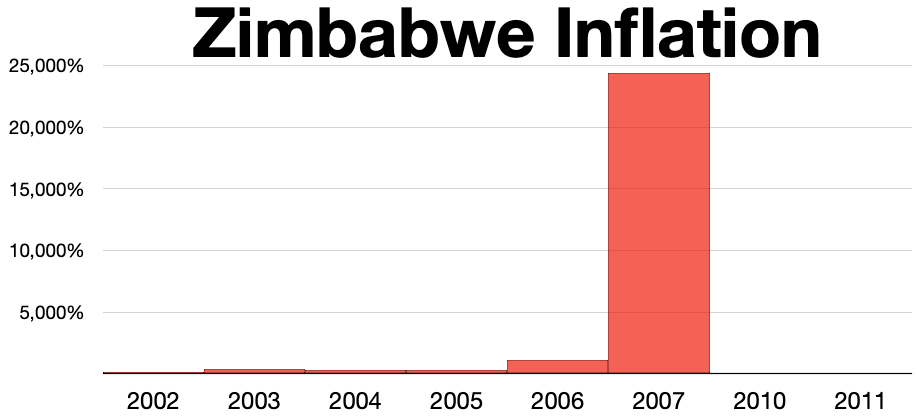
Zimbabwe inflation of almost 25,000% in 2007

Hyperinflation in Zimbabwe was one of the few instances that resulted in the abandonment of the local currency. At independence in 1980, the Zimbabwe dollar (ZWD) was worth about US$1.49 (or 67 Zimbabwean cents per U.S. dollar). Afterwards, however, rampant inflation and the collapse of the economy severely devalued the currency. Inflation was relatively steady until the early 1990s when economic disruption caused by failed land reform agreements and rampant government corruption resulted in reductions in food production and the decline of foreign investment. Several multinational companies began hoarding retail goods in warehouses in Zimbabwe and just south of the border, preventing commodities from becoming available on the market. The result was that to pay its expenditures Mugabe's government and Gideon Gono's Reserve Bank printed more and more notes with higher face values.

Hyperinflation began early in the 21st century, reaching 624% in 2004. It fell back to low triple digits before surging to a new high of 1,730% in 2006. The Reserve Bank of Zimbabwe revalued on 1 August 2006 at a ratio of 1,000 ZWD to each second dollar (ZWN), but year-to-year inflation rose by June 2007 to 11,000% (versus an earlier estimate of 9,000%). Larger denominations were progressively issued in 2008:

1. 5 May: banknotes or "bearer cheques" for the value of Z$100 million and Z$250 million.
2. 15 May: new bearer cheques with a value of Z$500 million (then equivalent to about US$2.50).
3. 20 May: a new series of notes ("agro cheques") in denominations of Z$5 billion, Z$25 billion and Z$50 billion.
4. 21 July: a "special agro-cheque" for Z$100 billion.

Inflation by 16 July officially surged to 2,200,000% with some analysts estimating figures surpassing 9,000,000%. As of 22 July 2008 the value of the Zimbabwe dollar fell to approximately Z$688 billion per US$1, or Z$688 trillion in pre-August 2006 Zimbabwean dollars.

Date of redenomination	Currency code	Value
1 August 2006	ZWN	$1,000 ZWD
1 August 2008	ZWR	$10^{10} ZWN = $10^{13} ZWD
2 February 2009	ZWL	$10^{12} ZWR = $10^{22} ZWN = $10^{25} ZWD

On 1 August 2008, the Zimbabwe dollar was redenominated at the ratio of 10^{10} ZWN to each third dollar (ZWR). On 19 August 2008, official figures announced for June estimated the inflation over 11,250,000%. Zimbabwe's annual inflation was 231,000,000% in July (prices doubling every 17.3 days). By October 2008 Zimbabwe was mired in hyperinflation with wages falling far behind inflation. In this dysfunctional economy hospitals and schools had chronic staffing problems, because many nurses and teachers could not afford bus fare to work. Most of the capital of Harare was without water because the authorities had stopped paying the bills to buy and transport the treatment chemicals. Desperate for foreign currency to keep the government functioning, Zimbabwe's central bank governor, Gideon Gono, sent runners into the streets with suitcases of Zimbabwean dollars to buy up American dollars and South African rand.

For periods after July 2008, no official inflation statistics were released. Prof. Steve H. Hanke overcame the problem by estimating inflation rates after July 2008 and publishing the Hanke Hyperinflation Index for Zimbabwe. Prof. Hanke's HHIZ measure indicated that the inflation peaked at an annual rate of 89.7 sextillion percent (89,700,000,000,000,000,000,000%, or 8.97×10^{22}%) in mid-November 2008. The peak monthly rate was 79.6 billion percent, which is equivalent to a 98% daily rate, or around 7×10^{108}% yearly rate. At that rate, prices were doubling every 24.7 hours. Note that many of these figures should be considered mostly theoretical since hyperinflation did not proceed at this rate over a whole year.

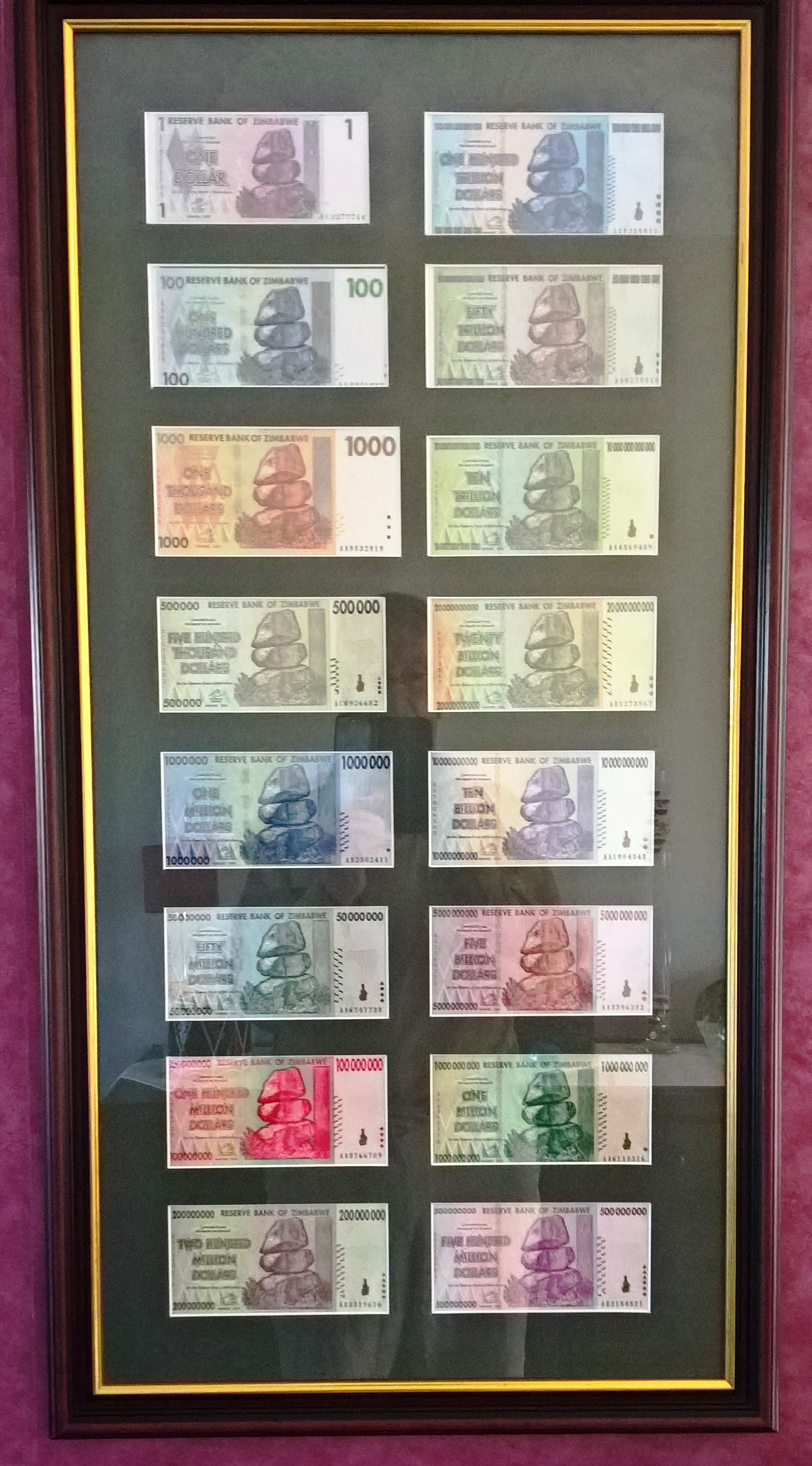
Selection of 16 original un-circulated Zimbabwe notes ranging in denomination from Z$1 to Z$100 trillion. They are all signed by Gideon Gono, the Governor of the Reserve Bank of Zimbabwe, in the period 2007 to 2008, who promises "to pay the bearer on demand".

At its November 2008 peak, Zimbabwe's rate of inflation approached, but failed to surpass, Hungary's July 1946 world record. On 2 February 2009, the dollar was redenominated for the third time at the ratio of 10^{12} ZWR to 1 ZWL, only three weeks after the Z$100 trillion banknote was issued on 16 January, but hyperinflation waned by then as official inflation rates in USD were announced and foreign transactions were legalised, and on 12 April the Zimbabwe dollar was abandoned in favour of using only foreign currencies. The overall impact of hyperinflation was US$1 = Z$10^{25}.

- Start and end date: March 2007 – mid November 2008
- Peak month and rate of inflation: mid November 2008, 7.96×10^{10}%

Ironically, following the abandonment of the ZWR and subsequent use of reserve currencies, banknotes from the hyperinflation period of the old Zimbabwe dollar began attracting international attention as collector's items, having accrued numismatic value, selling for prices many orders of magnitude higher than their old purchasing power.

== Most severe hyperinflations in world history ==
Highest monthly inflation rates in history as of August 2012
Country	Currency name	Month	Rate (%)	Equivalent daily inflation rate (%)	Time required for prices to double	Highest denomination
Hungary	Hungarian pengő	July 1946	4.19×10^{16}	207.19	14.82 hours	100 quintillion P (10^{20})
Zimbabwe	Zimbabwe dollar	November 2008	7.96×10^{10}	98.01	24.35 hours	$100 trillion (10^{14})
Yugoslavia	Yugoslav dinar	January 1994	3.13×10^{8}	64.63	1.39 days	500 billion DIN (5×10^{11})
Republika Srpska	Republika Srpska dinar	January 1994	2.97×10^{8}	64.35	1.40 days	50 billion DIN (5×10^{10})
Germany	German Papiermark	October 1923	29,500	20.89	3.65 days	100 trillion ℳ (10^{14})
Greece	Greek drachma	October 1944	13,800	17.88	4.21 days	₯100 billion (10^{11})
China	Chinese yuan	April 1949	5,070	14.06	5.27 days	$6 billion (6×10^{9})

== Units of inflation ==
Inflation rate is usually measured in percent per year. It can also be measured in percent per month or in price doubling time.

Example of inflation rates and units When first bought, an item cost 1 currency unit. Later, the price rose...
Old price	New price 1 year later	New price 10 years later	New price 100 years later	(Annual) inflation [%]	Monthly inflation [%]	Price e-folding frequency [years^{−1}]	Price doubling time [years]	Price e-folding time [years]	Zero add time [years]
1	1.0001	1.001	1.01	0.01	0.0008	0.0001	6931	10000	23028
1	1.001	1.01	1.11	0.1	0.00833	0.00100	693	1000	2300
1	1.003	1.03	1.35	0.3	0.0250	0.00300	231	334	769
1	1.01	1.10	2.70	1	0.0830	0.00995	69.7	100	231
1	1.03	1.34	19.2	3	0.247	0.00296	23.4	33.8	77.9
1	1.1	2.59	13800	10	0.797	0.0953	7.27	10.5	24.1
1	2	1024	1.27 × 10^{30}	100	5.95	0.693	1	1.44	3.32
1	10	10^{10}	10^{100}	900	21.2	2.30	0.301 (3 2/3 months)	0.434 (5 months)	1
1	31	8.20 × 10^{14}	1.37 × 10^{149}	3000	32.8	3.43	0.202 (2 1/2 months)	0.291 (3 1/2 months)	0.671 (8 months)
1	129.7463	1.35 × 10^{21}	2.04 × 10^{211}	12874.63	50	4.87	0.1424 (52 days)	0.206 (2 1/2 months)	0.4732 (5 2/3 months)
1	10^{12}	10^{120}	10^{1,200}	10^{14}	900	27.6	0.0251 (9 days)	0.0362 (13 days)	0.0833 (1 month)
1	1.67 × 10^{73}	1.69 × 10^{732}	1.87 × 10^{7,322}	1.67 × 10^{75}	1.26 × 10^{8}	169	0.00411 (36 hours)	0.00593 (52 hours)	0.0137 (5 days)
1	1.05 × 10^{2,637}	1.69 × 10^{26,370}	1.89 × 10^{263,702}	1.05 × 10^{2,639}	5.65 × 10^{221}	6072	0.000114 (1 hour)	0.000164 (1.4 hours)	0.000379 (3.3 hours)

$\hbox{New price } y \hbox{ years later} = \hbox{old price} \times \left(1+\frac{\hbox{inflation}}{100}\right)^{y}$

$\hbox{Monthly inflation} = 100 \times \left(\left(1+\frac{\hbox{inflation}}{100}\right)^{\frac{1}{12}} -1\right)$

$\hbox{Price e-folding frequency} = \ln \left(1+ \frac{\hbox{inflation}}{100}\right)$

$\hbox{Price doubling time} = \frac{1}{\log_2 \left(1+ \frac{\hbox{inflation}}{100}\right)}$

$\hbox{Price e-folding time} = \frac{1}{\ln \left(1+ \frac{\hbox{inflation}}{100}\right)}$

$\hbox{Years per added zero of the price} = \frac{1}{\log_{10} \left(1+ \frac{\hbox{inflation}}{100}\right)}$

Often, at redenominations, three zeros are cut from the face values of denominations. It can be read from the table that if the (annual) inflation is for example 100%, it takes about 3.32 years for prices to increase by an order of magnitude (e.g., to produce one more zero on the price tags), or 9.97 years to produce three zeros. Thus, can one expect a redenomination to take place about ten years after the currency was introduced.

== See also ==
- Blockade
- Chronic inflation
- Currency crisis
- Debt
- Fiat money
- The collection of precious metals for financial purposes, including as a hedge against inflation:
  - Gold as an investment
  - Silver as an investment
  - Platinum as an investment
  - Palladium as an investment
- Hoarding (economics)
- Hyperstagflation
- Inflation accounting
- Inflationism
- Inflation hedge
- Liberty dollar (private currency)
- Negative interest rates
- Outline of economics
- Zero stroke
