= Americas Quarterly =

Magazine

- The Fall 2013 cover of Americas Quarterly on Free Speech in the Americas
- Editor-in-Chief: Brian Winter
- Former editors: Christopher Sabatini
- Categories: Western Hemisphere, Latin America, Foreign policy, Politics, Current Events
- Frequency: Quarterly
- Total circulation (2013): 15,000
- First issue: August 27, 2007; 18 years ago
- Company: Americas Society and Council of the Americas
- Country: United States
- Based in: New York, New York
- Language: English
- Website: www.americasquarterly.org
- ISSN: 1936-797X

Americas Quarterly (AQ) is a publication dedicated to politics, business, and culture in the Americas.

== Distribution ==
AQ has an established relationship with NTN24, an online news channel from Colombia with three million viewers, to broadcast stories on topics from Americas Quarterly. Topics from AQ are also discussed on NTN's program Efecto Naím, with host Moisés Naím.

== Editorial board ==
- Mauricio Cárdenas Santamaría
- Fernando Henrique Cardoso
- Isabel Saint Malo
- Javier Corrales
- Monica de Bolle
- Ricardo Lagos
- Richard Lapper
- Stephanie Leutert
- Eduardo Levy Yeyati
- Valeria Moy
- Moisés Naím
- Patricio Navia
- Gray Newman
- Shannon O'Neil
- Thomas Shannon
- Ilona Szabó
- Eugene Zapata-Garesché
- Ernesto Zedillo

== The Capacity to Combat Corruption (CCC) Index ==
In 2019, the Americas Society/Council of the Americas (AS/COA) and Control Risks, the consulting firm specializing in global risks, present the publication of the Anti-Corruption Capacity Index (CCC), an analytical tool based on data to assess the ability of Latin American countries to uncover, punish, and stop corruption.

"The Index shows in detail how the anti-corruption wave that was advancing in Latin America a few years ago has lost steam and, in some places, is receding dangerously. What is even more worrying: this is happening while COVID-19 is increasing the risk of corruption throughout the region," said Roberto Simón, senior director of public policy at AS/COA.

The report has been published annually, with the latest edition released in 2023.

== Social Inclusion Index ==
AQ's annual Social Inclusion Index, which was published between 2012 and 2016, evaluated 17 countries on across 21 variables including access to public and private goods, popular attitudes toward empowerment and government responsiveness, and the protection of basic civil, political, and human, and disability rights as well as access to justice. The Index tracked social inclusion within and across countries over the long-term, addressing the multiple dimensions of social inclusion.

The 2014 Social Inclusion Index generated press coverage both in the U.S. and throughout Latin America.
