= Federico Sturzenegger =

Argentine economist

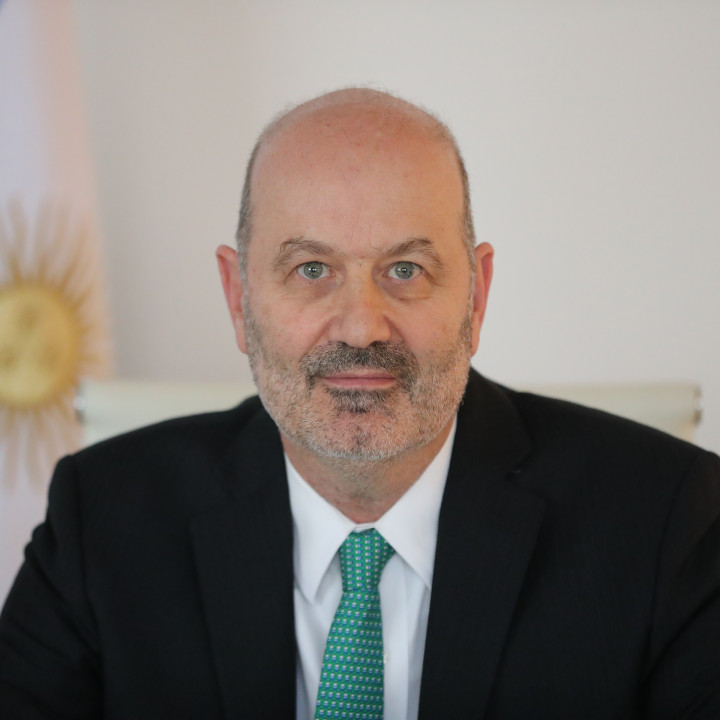
- Official portrait, 2024

Minister of Deregulation and State Transformation
- Incumbent
- Assumed office 5 July 2024
- President: Javier Milei
- Preceded by: Office established

President of the Central Bank of Argentina
- In office 10 December 2015 – 14 June 2018
- Preceded by: Alejandro Vanoli
- Succeeded by: Luis Caputo

National Deputy of Argentina
- In office 10 December 2013 – 10 December 2015
- Constituency: City of Buenos Aires

President of the Bank of the City of Buenos Aires
- In office 1 February 2008 – 9 October 2013
- Preceded by: Julio Macchi
- Succeeded by: Rogelio Frigerio

Personal details
- Born: Federico Adolfo Sturzenegger; 11 February 1966 (age 60) Rufino, Santa Fe, Argentina
- Party: LLA (2024–present)
- Other political affiliations: Recrear (2002–2008); PRO (2008–2024)
- Education: National University of La Plata (BA); Massachusetts Institute of Technology (PhD)
- Website: Official website

Federico Adolfo Sturzenegger (Spanish pronunciation: [feðeˈɾiko aˈðolfo estuɾseˈneɣeɾ]; born 11 February 1966) is an Argentine economist who is the current head of the Ministry of Deregulation and State Transformation under Javier Milei's presidency. He previously served as President of the Central Bank between 2015 and 2018.

He was a professor of economics at University of California, Los Angeles, Torcuato di Tella University (where he also was Dean of the Business School), and Kennedy School of Government of Harvard University. Currently he teaches at University of San Andres and is Honoris Causa Professor at HEC Paris. Throughout his academic career he has published close to fifty articles in refereed journals as well as eight books.

He was also Chief Economist of YPF, President of Bank of the City of Buenos Aires and a National Congressman for the PRO party.

== Early life and education ==
Sturzenegger was born 11 February 1966 in Rufino, Santa Fe, to Adolfo Sturzenegger, an economist and professor. His mother was an attorney and public school teacher in City Bell. His paternal family is of Swiss Argentine heritage, originally being from Appenzell, Switzerland. He has an older sister as well as a younger sister and brother.

While his father was completing a PhD at Harvard University, the family spent some of his early childhood years, living in Boston Massachusetts. After returning to Argentina, he was raised in Gonnet, in the outskirts of La Plata, attending public schools.

After attending high school at the Collegio Nacional de La Plata, he graduated in 1987 with an Economics degree from the National University of La Plata. He earned his Ph.D. from Massachusetts Institute of Technology in 1991.

== Academics ==
Between 1991 and 1994, Sturzenegger was an assistant professor of economics at the University of California, Los Angeles.

In 1998, Sturzenegger left his position in YPF and became Dean of the Business School at Torcuato di Tella University until the year 2001.

In 2002, he returned to his previous occupation as Dean at Torcuato di Tella University until the year 2005. From to 2005 to 2007, Sturzenegger was a visiting professor of public policy at the John F. Kennedy School of Government, Harvard University. In 2005, he was selected as Young Global Leader in the World Economic Forum in Davos and was awarded the Konex Prize in 2006.

=== Dark matter ===
Dark matter is a term coined by Sturzenegger and Ricardo Hausmann to refer to the 'invisible' assets that explain the difference between official estimates of the U.S. current account, and estimates based on the actual return on the U.S. net financial position. Specifically, the U.S. Bureau of Economic Analysis (BEA) estimated the net U.S. current account deficit to be 2.5 trillion in 2004. However, according to Sturzenegger and his colleague Ricardo Hausmann, the U.S. current account deficit cannot in reality be as high as it is estimated to be: otherwise, the U.S. would be paying large amounts of interests on its debt. This does not seem to be the case: net income in 2004 was still a positive 30 billion, which is not lower than it was in 1980, before the U.S. built up its current account deficit. Thus, the authors argue that the "real" cumulative current account between 1980 and 2004 had in fact been positive, and that somehow a large amount of (foreign) assets are being left out of the calculations.

The suggested source of this "missing wealth" is dark matter, resulting from the unaccounted export of ideas and other services (such as insurance or liquidity) from the U.S. to other economies. The two authors claim that the U.S. has significant exports, mainly of business know-how bundled with its Foreign direct investment, that do not show up in official trade statistics. These exports increase the real value of its foreign assets, and thus lower the real size of the deficit. Therefore, they argue, there is less reason to worry about the U.S. financial position than is usually assumed. In addition, this dark matter in the U.S. current account also has implications for the accounts of other countries, which have been inadvertently accruing liabilities by importing know-how.

=== De Facto Exchange Rate Regimes ===
In their paper "Classyfing Exchange Rate Regimes: Deeds vs. Words," Eduardo Levy Yeyati and Federico Sturzenegger developed a popular classification of exchange rate regimes de facto in the paper "Classyfing Exchange Rate Regimes: Deeds vs. Words". Stuzenegger and Levy Yeyati argued that most of the empirical literature on exchange rate regimes were using the IMF de jure classification based on regime announced by the governments, despite the recognized inconsistencies between reported and actual policies in many cases. Many countries that in theory had a flexible exchange rate intervened in exchange markets so pervasively that in practice very little difference existed (in terms of observable performance) with countries that have explicit fixed exchange rate regimes. Conversely, periodic devaluations of pegs in inflation-prone countries were the result of the implementations of monetary policies that were inconsistent with fixed exchange rates and that made the effective regime resemble a flexible arrangement. Moreover, countries that appeared to behave according to the declared regime during tranquil times could be tempted to change their course of action once the regime was under stress. Thus, a very different picture of exchange rate regime choices might have appeared once the international context became more volatile.

The authors proposed a new de facto classification of exchange rate regimes that reflected the actual rather than the announced policies, providing an alternative as well as a complement to the standard de jure approach. Sturzenegger and Levy Yeyati managed to define the exchange rate regimes according to the behavior of three classification variables: changes in the nominal exchange rate, the volatility of these changes, and the volatility of international reserves. Underlying the selection of these variables they made a textbook definition of exchange rate regimes, where fixed exchange rate regimes were associated with changes in international reserves aimed at reducing the volatility in the nominal exchange rate, and flexible exchange rates were characterized by substantial volatility in nominal rates with relatively stable reserves. Thus, the combined behavior of these three classifications was sufficient to determine the regime to which each country belonged at any point in time.

== Private sector ==
He returned to Argentina in 1995 when José Estenssoro appointed him as Chief Economist of Yacimientos Petrolíferos Fiscales.

== Public sector ==
=== Secretary of Political Economy of Argentina ===
In March 2001, during the government of Fernando de la Rúa, he served as Secretary of Political Economy of Argentina in Argentina, within the Ministry of Economy then headed by Ricardo López Murphy. A few days later, López Murphy was replaced by Cavallo's administration, and he resigned at the end of 2001.

=== Management of Banco Ciudad ===
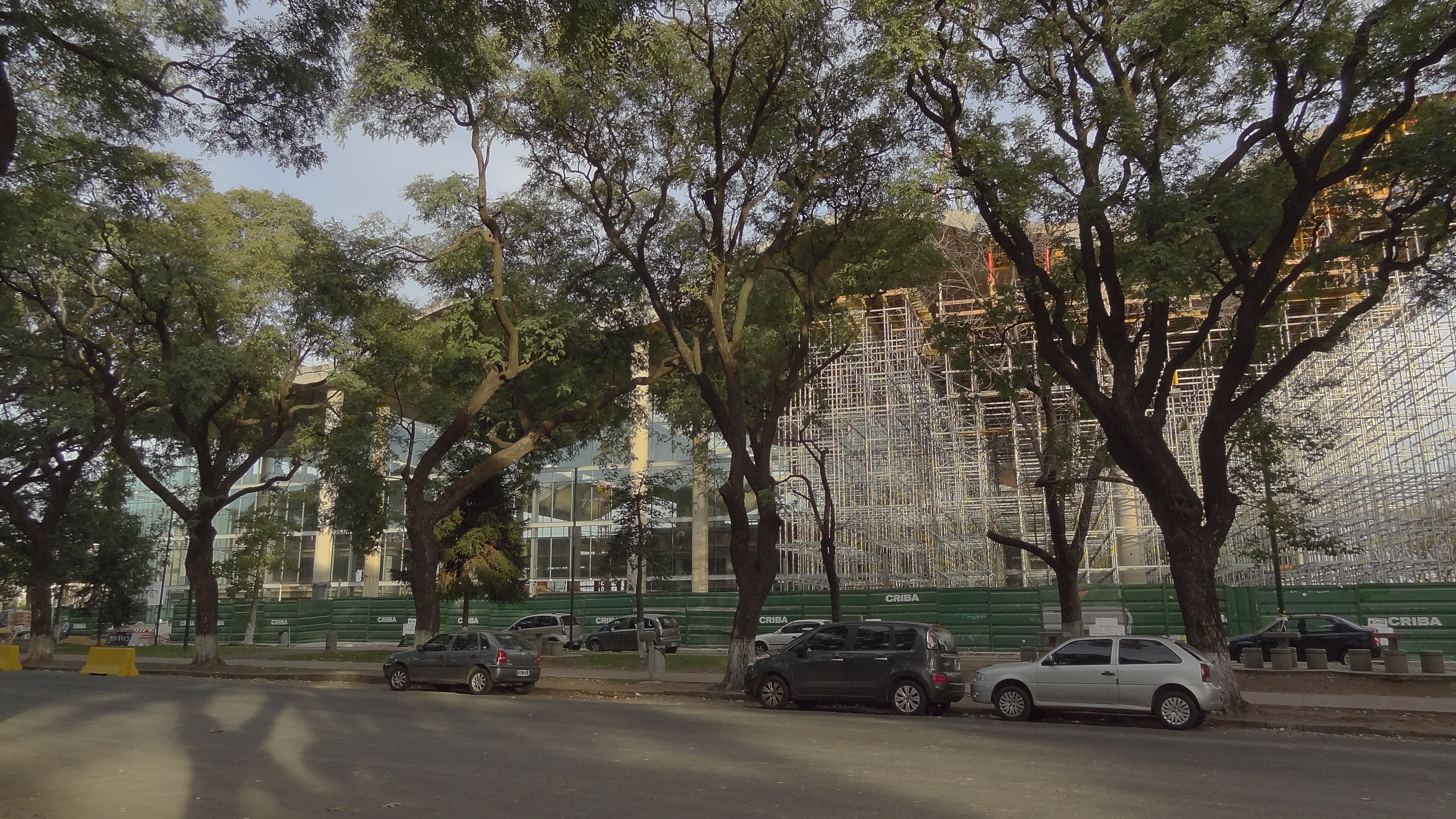
New Headquarter of Banco Ciudad in Parque Patricios

In February 2008, Sturzenegger was appointed president of the Bank of the City of Buenos Aires, a publicly owned, municipal commercial bank in Buenos Aires. Before Sturzenegger's appointment the bank was losing money. In the second half of 2007 it had suffered losses over 80 million Argentine pesos. In 2013, after six years under Sturzenegger's management, the bank reached a record profit of more than 1300 million Argentine pesos, becoming the most profitable state owned company in Argentina. Between the years 2008 and 2012 the bank tripled its net worth and multiplied by 7 its loans to medium and small enterprises, by 6 its loans to large enterprises, and by 4 its mortgage loans.

During Sturzenegger's management the bank became the only one in Argentina to offer a free savings account for all its clients, the only bank that had opened branches in shanty towns, and the only bank to offer loans (including mortgage loans) to people who earned the minimum wage. The bank also became known for pushing new alternatives for transportation, such as those that allowed the client to buy bicycles or for a taxi driver to buy his or her own cab.

Sturzenegger's management is known for implementing a unique hiring system based in meritocratic results and inspired in the Brazilian Development Bank. The primary objective of this new system was to promote equal opportunities through a recruiting based on academic results. A first selection was made on academic grades. The preselected group of applicants had then to conduct another exam at the Universidad de Buenos Aires. Those who had studied in public schools were prioritized for the selection.

By the year 2013 the bank was going to move its central headquarter to a new building designed by Norman Foster. The new headquarter was designed with construction standards that would make it the most sustainable public building in Latin America.

=== National Deputy (2013-2015) ===
In 2013, Federico Sturzenegger resigned as president of Banco Ciudad to become a Member of the Chamber of Deputies as a member of Republican Proposal.

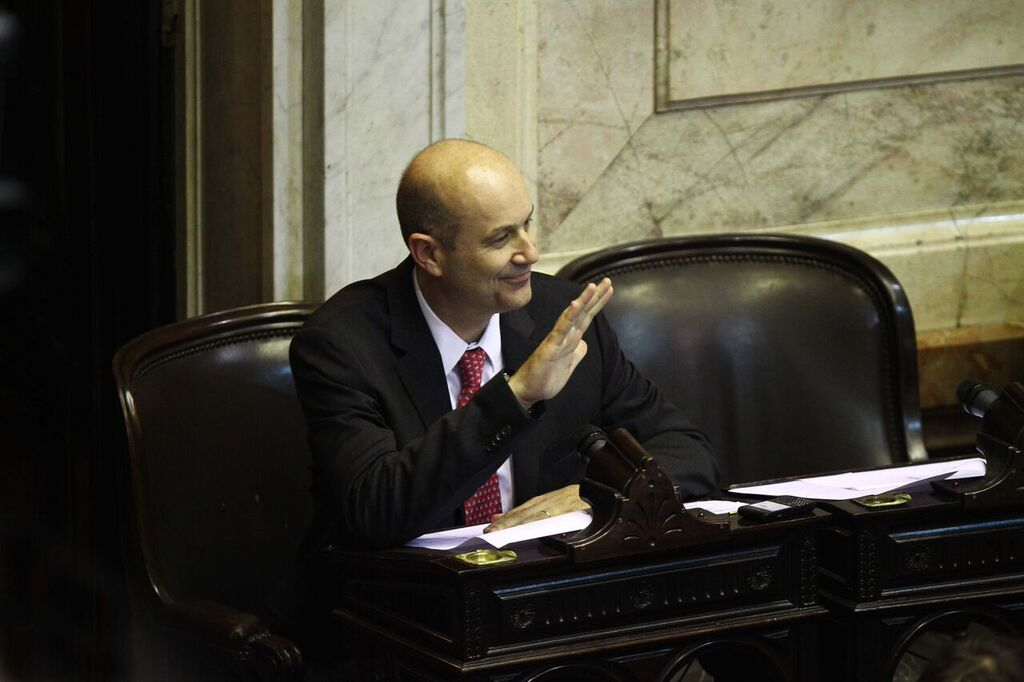
Jury of Federico Sturzenegger as National Congressman

As a Congressman, Federico Sturzenegger presented 11 bills and had numerous participations in the Chamber of Deputies. In the year 2014 he was 13º in a ranking of participation in sessions.

In a session in which a bill proposed by the then Minister of Transportation Florencio Randazzo, that allowed "open access" to the railroad tracks for freight transport, the Congressman managed to include the transport for passengers in this project. The law in question makes available rail infrastructure, to be used by any company created to operate rail freight as well as by individual companies. The National government put this law in practice in 2018.

One of the bills presented by Federico Sturzenegger was one that strived for universal and compulsory education since age 3. Soon after, the government presented a similar project which consisted of the obligation at 4 years of age. Sturzenegger argued that in many parts of the world it was shown that children who receive quality early education at the age of 3–4 years, had lower dropout rates, higher educational level completed, higher wages, better academic performance later, and a lower proportion of them was in the need to receive state social assistance plans.

As the former president of the Banco Ciudad he had a pending issue. After the so-called Conti Law, that took the judicial deposits from Banco Ciudad and transferred them to Banco Nación, he presented a project with the idea of allowing free competition between financial entities in order to attract these deposits, which would result in a higher level of service and better rates for the judicial deposits.

In December 2014 Sturzenegger presented a bill that consisted of implementing a loan scheme with the possibility of granting mortgage loans where the capital of the loan would move in line with the general level of inflation. The proposal was based on the Chilean model of indexed currency, using the Unidad de Fomento. According to the same project, implementing it would significantly reduce the interest rate on mortgage loans, approximating its value to a rental. As the value of capital is preserved, loans of 30 years or more would automatically would develop. Later on, as Governor of the Central Bank he implemented this mechanism, and the result was a significant lending boom in mortgages which led to triple digit growth rates in mortgages.

He also proposed eliminating the minimum prices for the airline industry (the Executive implemented this in 2018), implementing a transparent entry system for the public administration (he implemented such schemes both at Banco Ciudad as well as at the Central Bank), he proposed, following the guidelines of the OECD a project to make firms responsible for corruption (a similar law was approved in 2017), and he proposed a mechanism to ensure social aid beneficiaries not to lose their benefits as they transitioned to formal employment (the government implemented a similar scheme known as Plan Empalme in 2017).

=== Minister of Deregulation and State Transformation ===
At the end of 2023, Federico Sturzenegger became a major advisor to newly elected president Javier Milei to deregulate Argentina's economy.

On July 5, 2024, Milei created a ministry focused on implementing the reforms designed by Sturzenegger and appointed him as minister of this new organization. The name of the new entity was the Ministry of Deregulation and State Transformation. On the same day his appointment was published in the official bulletin, he was sworn in.

On July 18, 2024, he caused some controversy by announcing a bill that aims to include tips as part of the final bill in dining establishments.

== Presidency at Central Bank ==
Between 10 December 2015 and 14 June 2018, he served as President of the Central Bank during Mauricio Macri's administration.

Its management had three central objectives: build a monetary system more suitable for the country, develop the financial system and improve the means of payment technology.

Once the exchange restrictions inherited from the previous administration have been eliminated, he established a inflation targeting regime with a floating exchange rate that generates a pronounced drop in inflation.

Core inflation, in particular, by December 2017 had stabilized at an annualized value of 18%, with downward expectations. This disinflation process, in turn, occurred in a context of strong economic growth (the economy grew by in 2017). Even with these results in December 2017, the government decided to dismantle the system, which subsequently implied a process of increasing inflation, which motivated its departure shortly after.

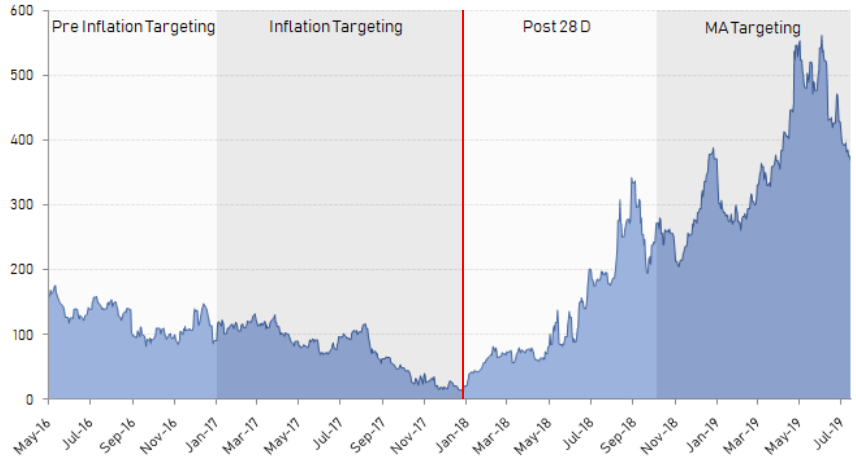
Spread Country Risk (EMBI+) for Argentina. The red line marks the 28D event.

To develop the financial system, he introduced the Purchasing Value Units (UVAS), deposits and credits that adjust for the price level, for the first time in decades, the development of long-term credit. The result was the highest credit growth in 20 years in 2017, with a real explosion in the mortgage loan segment, a process that has continued later. He also implemented a deep deregulation of bureaucratic restrictions that limits the potential growth of the financial sector.

Regarding payment methods, he promoted modern payment mechanisms such as PEI (Immediate electronic payment), mobile wallets, mobile payments, Debin, and homogenization of QR codes, which allow for accelerated growth of these alternative payment mechanisms. Likewise, it promoted the divestment of banks in the Prisma company (sole supplier of Visa in the country) in order to make the credit and debit card segment more competitive.

== Publications ==
- Advanced Macroeconomics: an Easy Guide. Filipe Campante, Federico Sturzenegger, Andrés Velasco. London: LSE Press, 2021
