= Ministry of Deregulation and State Transformation =

Government ministry of Argentina

- Ministerio de Desregulación y Transformación del Estado
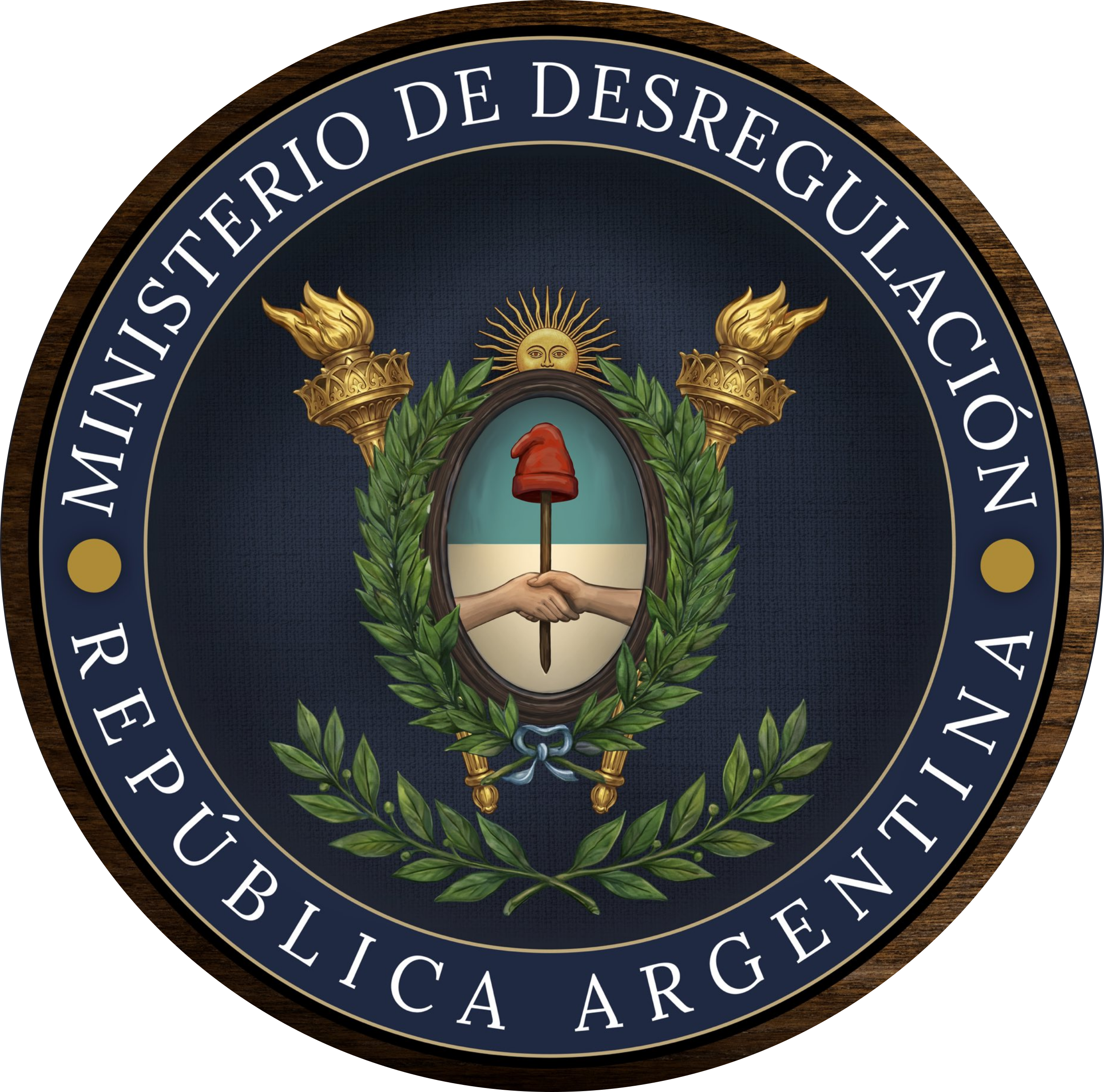

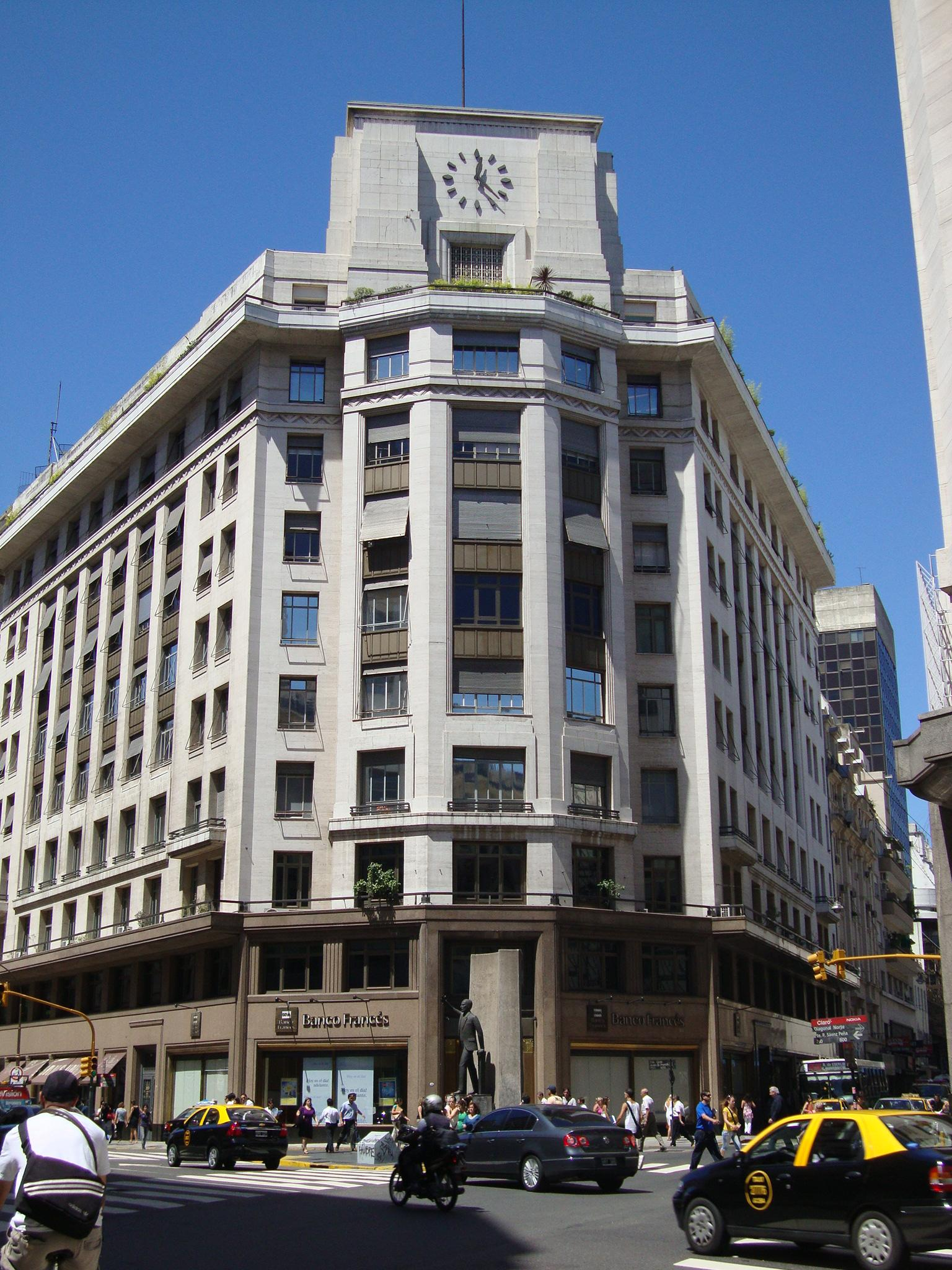
- Shell Mex building, headquarters

Ministry overview
- Formed: 5 July 2024; 2 years ago
- Jurisdiction: Government of Argentina
- Headquarters: Av. Roque Sáenz Peña 788, San Nicolás, Buenos Aires
- Minister responsible: Federico Sturzenegger
- Website: www.argentina.gob.ar/desregulacion

The Ministry of Deregulation and State Transformation (Spanish: Ministerio de Desregulación y Transformación del Estado) of Argentina is a ministry of the national executive power. Its purpose is to help the president and chief of the Cabinet of Ministers in matters related to deregulation, reform, and modernization efforts.

The inaugural and current head of the Ministry is Federico Sturzenegger, who was appointed on 5 July 2024. The Ministry was created after the passing of the law of Bases and Starting Points for the Freedom of Argentines, which enjoys powers delegated by the government, necessary requirements to allow the Ministry to function in eliminating, modifying, or implementing decrees.

Javier Milei, the current president of Argentina, has stated that Elon Musk called Sturzenegger to discuss the United States imitating the model of the Ministry of Deregulation and State Transformation with the Department of Government Efficiency.

== Jurisdiction ==
Order 585/2024, modifies the 22 520 law, stating that the jurisdiction of the Ministry of Deregulation and State Transformation is designed:

"to assist the President and the Chief of the Cabinet of Ministers, in order of their jurisdictions, in everything concerning the courses of action for the implementation of deregulation, reform and modernization of the state in order to re-size and reduce public expenses, and to improve the efficiency and efficacy of the organisms which constitute the National Public Administration, the transformation of red tape, the simplification of the state and the design and execution of public employee policies".

== Organization ==
Centralized departments of the Ministry of Deregulation and State Transformation
Ministry	Secretary	Title	Assumed office	Party
Ministry of Deregulation and State Transformation	Secretary for the Simplification of the State	Martín Antonio Rossi	1 August 2024	Independent
Ministry of Deregulation and State Transformation	Secretary for the Transformation of the State and Public Functions	Maximiliano Fariña	19 July 2024	Independent
Ministry of Deregulation and State Transformation	Secretary for Legal and Administrative Coordination	Marcelo Julián Hernández	1 August 2024	Independent

#	Name	Party	Period		President
#	Name	Party	Start	End	President
1	Federico Sturzenegger	Republican Proposal	5 July 2024	Incumbent	Javier Milei
