= Eduardo Levy Yeyati =

Argentine economist and author (born 1965)

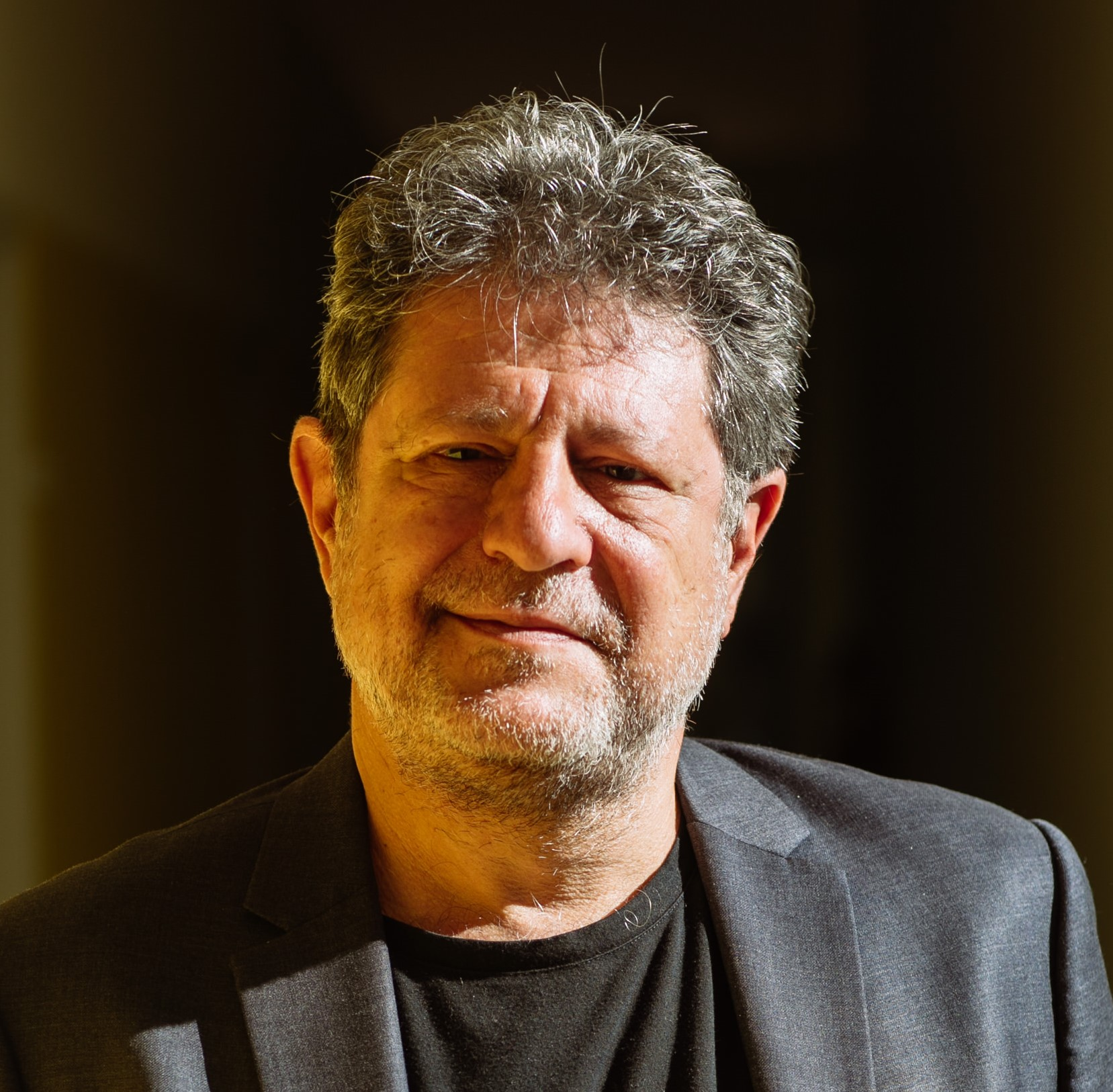
- Born: November 14, 1965 (age 61); Buenos Aires, Argentina

Academic background
- Education: Universidad de Buenos Aires (B.S. in Civil Engineering, 1989) University of Pennsylvania (Ph.D. in economics, 1996)

Academic work
- Discipline: Economic Development International Finance
- Institutions: Universidad Torcuato Di Tella Universidad de Buenos Aires Harvard Kennedy School of Government
- Website: Information at IDEAS / RePEc

Eduardo Levy Yeyati (Buenos Aires, 14 November 1965) is an Argentine economist and author. He holds a B.Sc. in Civil Engineering from the University of Buenos Aires and a Ph.D. in Economics from the University of Pennsylvania. He was Head of Emerging Markets Strategy at Barclays, Chief Economist at the Central Bank of Argentina, and Dean of the School of Government at Universidad Torcuato Di Tella. He is a Full Professor at the School of Government of Universidad Torcuato Di Tella, founder and academic director of the Center for Evidence-based Policy Evaluation (CEPE), Senior Fellow at the Global Development Program of the Brookings Institution, where he directs the "Workforce of the Future" initiative, economic advisor at Adcap Grupo Financiero, senior researcher at Argentina's National Scientific and Technical Research Council (CONICET), member of the Editorial Board of Americas Quarterly, consulting member of the Argentine Council for International Relations (CARI), and member of the Advisory Board of Fundación Ágora.

He is recognised for his contributions to financial theory, especially for coining the concept of financial dollarisation and for developing one of the most widely used classifications of exchange rate regimes. In 2015, he received the Centennial Prize of the National Academy of Economic Sciences for his paper Fear of appreciation (published in the Journal of Development Economics), and in 2007 he held the Robert Kennedy Visiting Professorship at Harvard University.

== Career ==
For much of his career, Eduardo Levy Yeyati combined academic and policy-oriented research with public policy roles and private sector work.

He is currently a Plenary Professor at the School of Government at Universidad Torcuato Di Tella, where he served as Dean (2017–2023) and created the Center for Evidence-based Policy Evaluation (CEPE). He is also a Senior Research Fellow at CONICET and Senior Fellow at the Brookings Institution’s Global Development Program, where he leads the “Workforce of the Future” initiative.

He held academic positions at the University of Buenos Aires, Harvard Kennedy School, London School of Economics, Barcelona Graduate School of Economics, and Universitat Pompeu Fabra. He directed the Center for Financial Research at UTDT (1999–2007), was Visiting Research Fellow at the Inter-American Development Bank and the International Monetary Fund, and served as Senior Editor for Oxford University Press’s Encyclopedia of Economics and Finance.

In public service, he was Chief Economist and Manager of Monetary and Financial Policy at the Central Bank of Argentina (2002), Director at BICE (2016), and advisor to the Chief of Cabinet for the “Argentina 2030” strategy. He chaired the Argentina 2030 Presidential Council (2017–2018) and held various advisory roles with CAF, FLAR, USAID, and the Argentine Senate.

He was Head of Emerging Markets Strategy and Global Strategist at Barclays Capital (2007–2010), and in 2011 founded Elypsis, a private economic research firm.

He also served as President of CIPPEC (2014–2016), and participated in initiatives like Argentina Debate and the Production Council of the Ministry of Production.

== Writings ==
His academic work on emerging market banking and finance have been published in American Economic Review, Journal of the European Economic Association, Journal of International Economics, European Economic Review, Journal of Development Economics, and Economic Policy, among other international refereed journals, and is ranked at the top by RePEc among Argentina's economists. His research have focused on financial dollarization, the behavior of banks and financial markets during crises, international financial architecture, monetary and exchange-rate regimes and development finance.

Together with Federico Sturzenegger, he prepared a popular classification of de facto exchange-rate regimes, and contributed the monetary and exchange rate policy chapter of the last edition of the Handbook of Development Economics. His writes regularly for Vox EU and Project Syndicate, and for local newspapers La Nación and Perfil.

In Spanish, he has published two essays on Argentina's recent political and economic history, one on the 2002 crisis and its aftermath with the historian Diego Valenzuela (La resurrección: La historia de la poscrisis Argentina, 2007, Ed. Sudamericana) and another one on the decline of the post crisis economic boom with historian Marcos Novaro (Vamos por Todo: La 10 decisiones más polémicas del modelo, 2013, Ed. Sudamericana), a book on development, ("Porvenir: Caminos al Desarrollo Argentino", 2015, Ed. Sudamericana), and an essay on the futuro of work in the developing world ("Después del Trabajo: El empleo argentino en la cuarta revolución industrial", 2018, Ed. Sudamericana).

== De facto exchange rate regimes ==
In joint work with Federico Sturzenegger, Eduardo Levy Yeyati developed a classification of exchange rate regimes de facto in the paper "Classyfing Exchange Rate Regimes: Deeds vs. Words". Stuzenegger and Levy Yeyati highlighted that most of the empirical literature on exchange rate regimes had been using the IMF de jure classification based on official sources, despite well-known inconsistencies between reported and actual policies. The authors argued that many countries that in theory adopted a flexible exchange rate regime intervened in exchange markets so pervasively that for practical purposes (in terms of observable performance) they could be assimilated to countries with explicit fixed exchange rate regimes. Conversely, periodic exchange rate realignments in inflation-prone peg countries reflected a monetary policy more inconsistent with flexible exchange rate arrangements.

In this light, the authors proposed a de facto classification of exchange rate regimes that attempted to reflect actual rather than reported policies, providing an alternative and a complement to the standard de jure groupings. Sturzenegger and Levy Yeyati's classification is based on three variables: changes in the nominal exchange rate, the volatility of these changes, and the volatility of international reserves, following a textbook definition of regimes according to which fixed exchange rates are associated with changes in international reserves (to reduce the volatility of the nominal exchange rate) whereas flexible exchange rates are characterized by volatility in nominal rates coupled with relatively stable reserves. The combined behavior of these three variables can be used to provide a fairly robust characterization of the de facto regime at particular years.

== Fiction ==
As an author of fiction, he published three novels: Gallo (2008, Random House Mondadori), Culebrón (2013, Ed. Random House), and El Juego de la Mancha (2018, Random House)
