= 28D =

Political situation in Argentina

28D is the term used to refer to the 28 December 2017 press conference of the Central Bank of Argentina together with the Treasury in which they changed their inflation target. This event is the beginning of the loss of confidence that sparked the beginning of the 2018 Argentine monetary crisis.

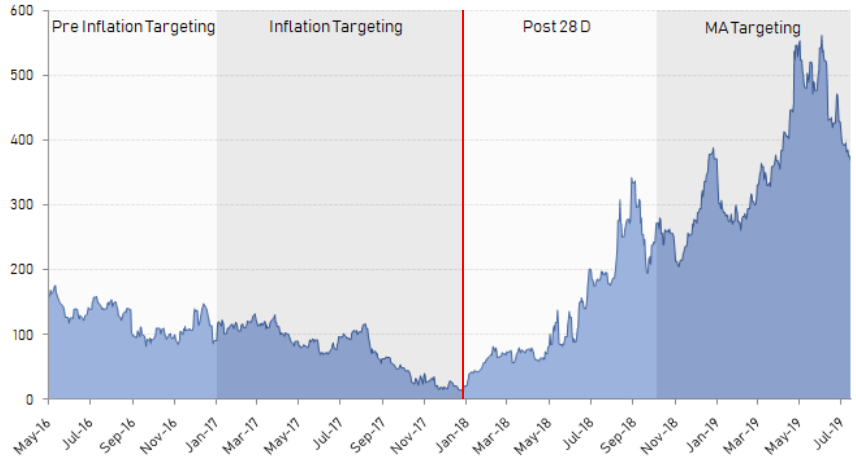
Spread Country Risk (EMBI+) for Argentina. The red line marks the 28D event.

== Background ==
Inflation in 2017 was 25% and the Macri's administration was coming off a major victory in the legislative elections.

On 28 December, the change in inflation targets for 2018 was announced, which was 10% annually and was raised to 15%.

Many read this measure as it was an advance of the Chief of Cabinet and the Ministers of Treasury and Public Finance on the independence of the Central Bank.
