= Pablo Quirno =

Argentine businessman and politician

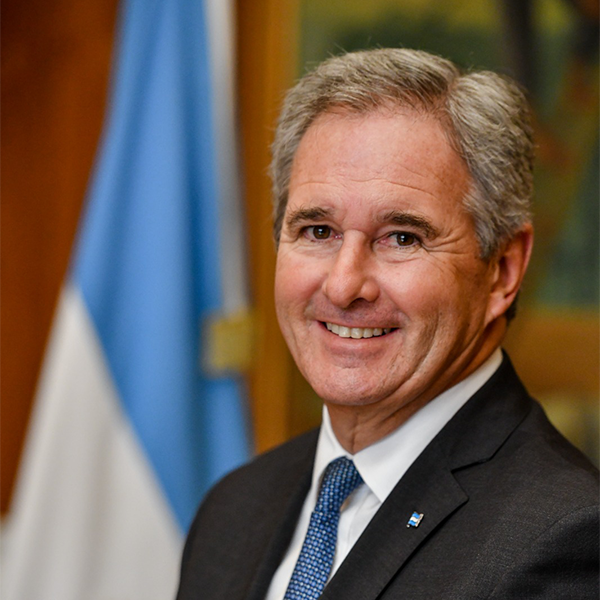
- Official portrait, 2025

Minister of Foreign Affairs, International Trade and Worship
- Incumbent
- Assumed office 23 October 2025
- President: Javier Milei
- Preceded by: Gerardo Werthein

Secretary of Finance and International Economic Relations
- In office December 2024 – 23 October 2025
- President: Javier Milei
- Preceded by: Eduardo Setti

General Coordinator of the Finance Secretariat
- In office February 2016 – September 2018
- President: Mauricio Macri
- Minister: Luis Caputo

Personal details
- Born: 24 August 1966 (age 60) Buenos Aires, Argentina
- Party: Juntos por el Cambio (2017–2024); La Libertad Avanza (2024–present)
- Education: University of Pennsylvania
- Occupation: Economist; Politician

Pablo Quirno (Spanish pronunciation: [ˈpaβlo ˈkiɾno]; born 24 August 1966) is an Argentine economist, currently serving as Foreign Minister of Argentina under President Javier Milei. He previously served as Secretary of Finance under Milei and held other positions in economics during the presidency of Mauricio Macri (2015–2019).

== Biography ==
=== Education and positions under Macri (2015–2019) ===
Quirno graduated in economics from the University of Pennsylvania and later worked at JPMorgan Chase as director of mergers and acquisitions for the Latin American region. He was also a member of the Regional Management Committee. In 2004, Quirno founded a fixed-income investment management firm in the United States, where he was a managing partner until 2015, when it was sold to Fiera Capital.

In February 2016, Quirno was appointed General Coordinator of the Finance Secretariat, headed by Alfonso Prat-Gay, and under the ministership of Luis Caputo, whom he knew from his time at JPMorgan.

In January 2017, following the division of the Ministry of Finance and Public Finance, he became Chief of Staff of the newly formed Ministry of Finance, headed by Caputo. Later, in July of that year, the government appointed Quirno Chief of Staff of Advisors to the Secretariat of International Economic Relations, a position that had not previously existed in Argentine history. Following Caputo's move to the presidency of the Central Bank, Quirno joined the board of directors of the Bank in July 2018. He resigned from this position following the replacement of Caputo by Guido Sandleris in September 2018.

=== Foreign Minister (2025–present) ===
In October 2025, after the resignation of Gerardo Werthein, Quirno was appointed as foreign minister in order to deepen the "pro-market" vision of the government. Previous to his designation at the Foreign Ministry and following Javier Milei's inauguration in December 2023, Milei chose Quirno as part of a series of appointments of economic advisors during the presidency of Mauricio Macri. He was subsequently appointed Secretary of Finance, while Caputo as Minister of Economy and Santiago Bausili, whom Quirno also knew from his time at JPMorgan, as president of the Central Bank. In December 2024, in the context of a restructuring of the Ministry of Foreign Affairs, International Trade and Worship, Quirno was appointed as responsible for coordinating International Economic Relations. However, he did not formally hold the position of secretary, but rather acted as an advisor in that area, collaborating on issues related to foreign economic policy while maintaining his position in finance.

One of the first major events attended by Quirno in his exercise of Foreign Minister was the 2025 G20 Johannesburg summit in South Africa, where he was sent in representation of president Milei, who aligned with US President Donald Trump and boycotted the summit due to accusations against the South African government of allegedly not doing enough to stop a genocide of Afrikaners in the country. In the signing of a final document, Argentina did not join the rest of participating nations, with Quirno saying that Argentina does not subscribe to the body's position on the Middle East conflict, saying that it omits context and geopolitical issues.

Quirno conveyed Argentina's support for the 2026 Israeli–United States strikes on Iran, saying that the strikes aimed to neutralize (Iranian) threats and that they will bring a "lasting international stability and security in the region."

=== Controversy ===
In 2018, Quirno was accused of nepotism by the media after his 26-year-old son was appointed undersecretary of the Secretariat of International Economic Relations.

Political offices
Preceded by Gerardo Werthein	Minister of Foreign Affairs and Worship; 2025–present	Incumbent
