= Nicolás Dujovne =

Argentine economist

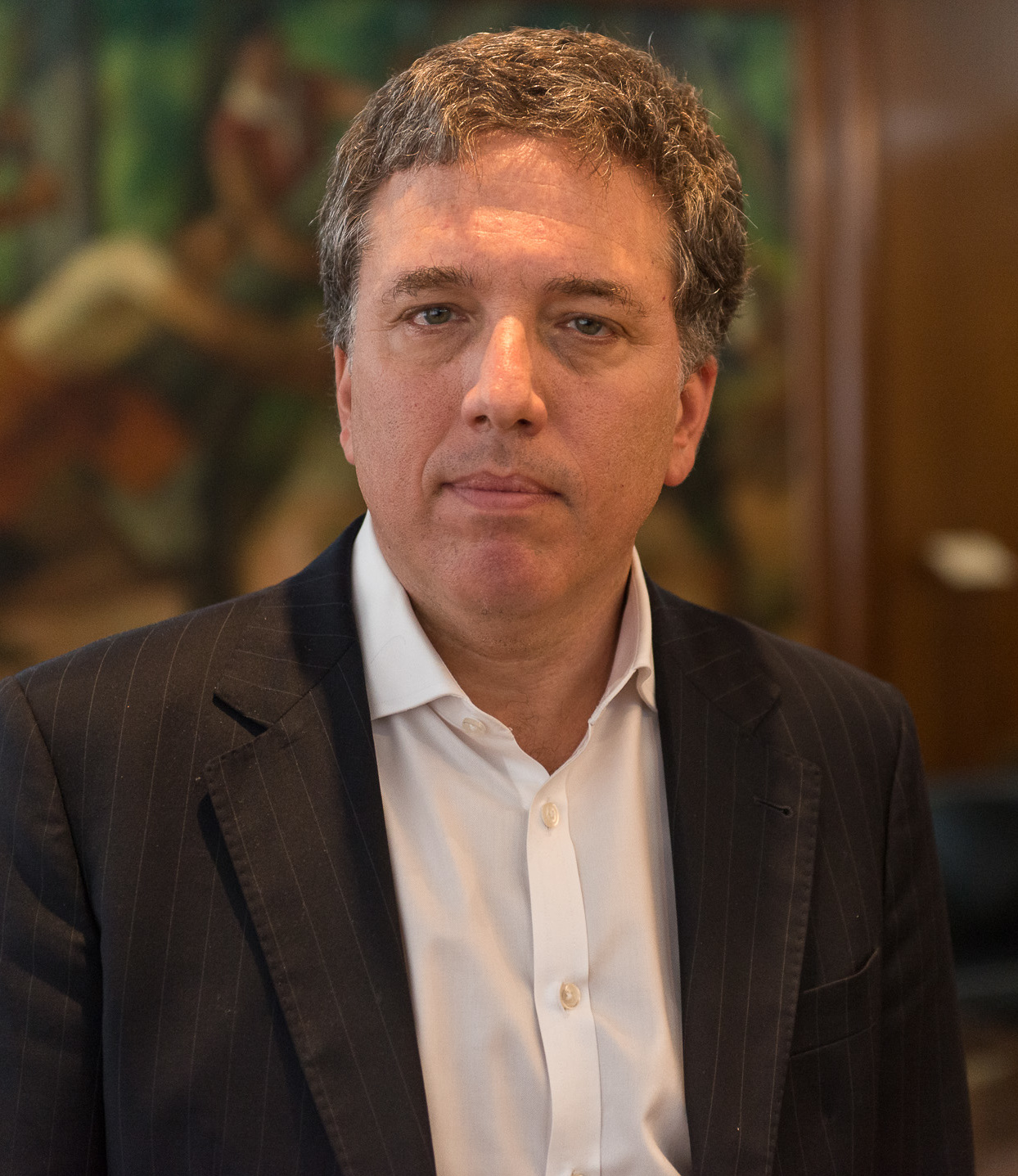

Minister of the Treasury of Argentina
- In office 10 January 2017 – 17 August 2019
- President: Mauricio Macri
- Preceded by: Alfonso Prat-Gay
- Succeeded by: Hernán Lacunza

Personal details
- Born: 18 May 1967 (age 59) Buenos Aires, Argentina
- Education: University of Buenos Aires; Torcuato di Tella University

Nicolás Dujovne (Spanish pronunciation: [nikoˈlas ðuˈxoβne]; born May 18, 1967) is an Argentine economist and former Minister of the Treasury between 2017 and 2019 under the administration of Mauricio Macri.

After leaving the government, Dujovne co-founded Tenac Asset Management in 2020, a hedge fund specializing in emerging markets macroeconomic strategies.

== Biography ==
The Dujovne family, of Ashkenazi Jewish origin, has been present in Argentina since the early 20th century. His great-grandfather, Isaac Dujovne, emigrated to Argentina in 1899 from Kurilovich, a village near the city of Mohyliv-Podilskyi, which at the time was part of the Russian Empire. The family settled in the Basavilbaso Colony, in the province of Entre Ríos, a town that welcomed many Jewish settlers as part of the Jewish Colonization Association (JCA) project, founded by Baron Maurice de Hirsch.

Among Isaac’s children, two stand out: the philosopher León Dujovne (great-uncle of Nicolás) and the engineer Israel Dujovne (his grandfather). Israel worked in construction and founded his own firm in Buenos Aires in 1930. Berardo Dujovne, son of Israel and father of Nicolás, is a prominent architect and former dean of the Faculty of Architecture, Design and Urbanism at the University of Buenos Aires, where he also served as vice-rector. Since 1964, Berardo has led the Dujovne-Hirsch studio alongside his wife, architect Silvia Hirsch, mother of Nicolás.

Nicolás Dujovne was born in Buenos Aires in 1967. He was raised in the city of Vicente López and completed his primary education at Nueva Escuela Argentina 2000. He completed his secondary education at the Colegio Nacional y Comercial de Vicente López. During his teenage years, he developed an interest in photography. In 1987, he took photographs for the band Los Pericos, thanks to his friendship with the keyboardist Martín Gutman.

He is married to Carolina Yellati, with whom he has three children. They live in the Bajo Belgrano neighborhood of Buenos Aires. He is a fan of River Plate.

=== Education ===
He studied at the Faculty of Economic Sciences of the University of Buenos Aires, where he graduated with a degree in Economics in 1990.

He pursued postgraduate studies at the Di Tella Institute and later worked as a professor of “Banking Management Topics” in the Master’s program in Finance at the Torcuato di Tella University.

=== Professional Activity ===
Between 1991 and 1992, he worked as an economist at Citibank Argentina, where he began his professional career in the financial sector. From 1993 to 1994, he worked as a senior economist at the firm Alpha. Later, between 1994 and 1997, he held the same position at the consulting firm Macroeconómica S.A.

Between 2001 and 2011, he was the chief economist at Banco Galicia. In 2011, he founded his own consultancy, Dujovne y Asociados, which he led until 2016. He has also worked as a consultant for the World Bank.

Dujovne gained prominence in the media as a columnist for the newspaper La Nación starting in 2011, and from 2015, as a co-host alongside journalist Carlos Pagni on the television program Odisea Argentina, broadcast on the Todo Noticias channel.

Between April and December 2016, he served as an Independent Board Director at Banco Patagonia.

=== Political Activity ===
Although he has never held party membership, he maintained a long-standing relationship with the Radical Civic Union (UCR). During his secondary school years, he briefly participated in the youth wing of the Intransigent Party.

Between 1997 and 1998, during the presidency of Carlos Menem, he served as chief advisor to the Deputy Minister of Economy, Pablo Guidotti. During Fernando de la Rúa’s presidency, he served as the Ministry of Economy’s representative on the Board of Directors of the Central Bank of Argentina and was a member of the board of Papel Prensa, representing the National Government.

In 2011, he was economic advisor for the presidential campaign of Ricardo Alfonsín, the son of former President Raúl Alfonsín. Between 2012 and 2016, he served as an advisor to Radical senator Luis Naidenoff.

Close to Mauricio Macri, Dujovne has been coordinator of the economic cabinet of his government, along with Mario Quintana, working in the technical teams of the Pensar Foundation, and contributing during his presidential campaign on fiscal issues.

On December 26, 2016, after the dismissal of Alfonso Prat-Gay by President Macri, the splitting into two of the Ministry of Finance and Public Finance was announced, with Dujovne being appointed Minister of Finance from January 2017. Prior to assuming office, he resigned from the Senate and closed his consultancy.

== Minister of the Treasury ==
Dujovne faced a deep fiscal adjustment promoted by Macri and deepened by the International Monetary Fund.

In 2017, he faced the tax reform, which he managed to pass in Congress after some conflicts with industrial sectors due to internal tax increases or rebalancing of employer contributions. The fiscal pressure ended in 2019 almost two points less than in 2015.

He signed a pact with the provinces to fiscally order their accounts and begin to lower the gross income and the stamp tax. Once the elections were won, a new index was launched to update inflation with the intention of lowering the deficit further.

Its first year ended with a 2.9% increase in gross domestic product, after a 2016 dulled by high inflation and the fall of the economy. That performance was key for the Macri government to win the midterm legislative elections and revalidate its leadership.

After the crisis that began in April 2018, the year that ended with stagflation, everything changed. Dujovne looked for ways to restore confidence by taking fiscal balance as an anchor, but nothing worked until the arrival of the International Monetary Fund, an idea attributed to Luis Caputo.

The reestablishment of withholdings in mid-July was a serious blow to the economic team, which maintained that the improvement in the fiscal balance should be due to a drop in spending (something that it eventually achieved) and not due to the rise in income (which it ended up promoting). He then sealed a 2019 Budget with the opposition. That budget impaired some improvements in the tax reform.

Key to this leap was the strong link with Washington, particularly with Steven Mnuchin, US Secretary of the Treasury and Donald Trump's man of confidence, with the IMF's technical teams and with the 2018 G20 Ministers of Economy (Dujovne acted as coordinator, when Argentina was the first host country).

In 2018, President Macri assigned economic leadership to Nicolás Dujovne, with the aim of centralizing decision-making. Thus, Guido Sandleris, who was the number two at the Ministry of Economy, took over as president of the Central Bank, replacing Luis Caputo

Under the new leadership, Argentina reformulated its program with the IMF in September 2018, achieving an increase in available disbursements from the IMF from USD 50 billion to USD 57 billion.

Within that program, a new monetary scheme was established whereby the peso floated freely between bands, and a very strict monetary base control target was set, stipulating a freeze on the monetary base in nominal terms. The government also set a primary fiscal balance target for 2019, which resulted in a correction of about five percentage points in the primary fiscal result during President Macri's administration. Until the August 2019 primary elections, the exchange rate remained stable, with retail inflation falling to 2.2% in July 2019, and wholesale inflation to 0.1% in the same month.

After his resignation in August 2019, he said that: "he contributed to the construction of a different country, modern, integrated into the world, plural and with the necessary macroeconomic balances for sustainable development"; and noted the achievements in reducing the fiscal deficit and public spending and in reducing distorting taxes in the provinces.

== Other activities ==
- Central American Bank for Economic Integration (CABEI), Ex-Officio Member of the Board of Governors (2016-2019)
- Inter-American Investment Corporation (IIC), Ex-Officio Member of the Board of Governors (2016-2019)
- International Monetary Fund (IMF), Ex-Officio Member of the Board of Governors (2016-2019)
- Joint World Bank-IMF Development Committee, Member (2018)
- World Bank, Ex-Officio Member of the Board of Governors (2016-2019)
- Multilateral Investment Guarantee Agency (MIGA), World Bank Group, Ex-Officio Member of the Board of Governors (2016-2019)

== Later career ==
In 2020, Dujovne co-founded Tenac Asset Management together with economists José Antonio González Anaya, former Secretary of Finance of Mexico, and Fernando Jasnis, former Undersecretary of Administration and Patrimonial Standardization of Argentina. In 2022, Pablo Guidotti, former Secretary of Finance of Argentina in the 1990s, joined the firm.

Starting in 2022, he became a frequent participant on the television program Odisea Argentina (LN+), hosted by Carlos Pagni, as well as on +Entrevistas with Luis Novaresio, where he commented on the Argentine economic situation.

In September 2024, he advised the PRO bloc in the Chamber of Deputies, alongside Hernán Lacunza, in its analysis of the 2025 Budget.

In April 2026, he forecast annual inflation of between 28% and 29% for that year, well above the official estimate of 10.1%.

== Publications ==
- Argentina's economy: Balancing growth and stability, Financial Times, 2018.
- Seeking international capital, El Inversor Energético y Minero, February 2017, 11(111), p. 4. CDIArgentina Portal. (In Spanish)
- Argentina and its sovereign spread: looking beyond the turbulence, Indicadores de Coyuntura, November 2007, (482), pp. 6–10. CDI Portal. (In Spanish)
- OED review of Bank assistance for financial sector reform, World Bank, February 2003. Co-authored with M. Kiguel.
- Restructuring Argentina's public debt: Realities and challenges for economic policy, in The renegotiation of external debt, National Academy of Economic Sciences, Buenos Aires, 2003, pp. 22–62. Co-authored with P. Guidotti. (In Spanish)
- The restructuring of debt after the disorderly default, Torcuato Di Tella University, October 2002. Co-authored with P. Guidotti. (In Spanish)
- A fiscal rule for Argentina: Considerations and proposals, Banco Galicia and School of Government, Torcuato di Tella University, July 2002. Co-authored with P. Guidotti. (In Spanish)
- Banking system crisis or macroeconomic crisis?, in M. Cohen & M. Gurman (Eds.), Argentina in Collapse?, IIED-Latin America, Buenos Aires, 2002, pp. 51–58. (In Spanish)
- Evaluating growth in Argentina, Buenos Aires: s.n., March 2001. CDI Portal. (In Spanish)
- The Argentine financial system and its prudential regulation, in FIEL (Ed.), Growth and equity in Argentina: Foundations of economic policy for the decade, October 2001, pp. 131–211. Co-authored with P. Guidotti. (In Spanish)
- Slovenia and the process of accession to the European Union, World Bank, June 2000. Co-authored with P. Guidotti. (In Spanish)
- Credit in Argentina: Factors of overcost, Argentine Banks Association (ADEBA), 1997. Co-authored with M. Vicens and R. Onofri. (In Spanish)
- Illiquidity and insolvency in the Argentine financial system, World Bank, February 1995. Co-authored with M. Vicens. (In Spanish)
