= Pasaron cosas =

Resounding sentence by Mauricio Macri

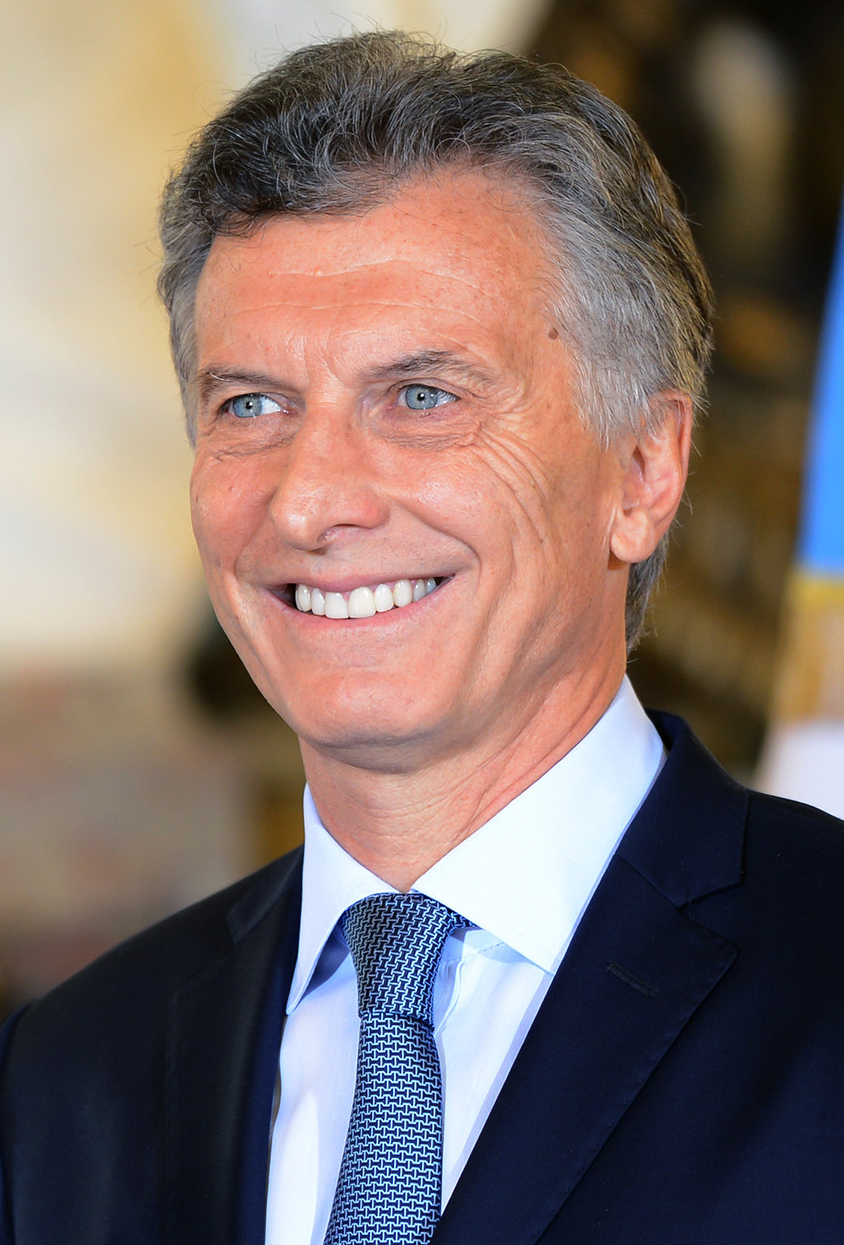
Mauricio Macri

Veníamos bien, pero de golpe pasaron cosas (Spanish pronunciation: [paˈsaɾoŋ ˈkosas], English: "Things happened" or "We were doing well, but then things happened all of a sudden") or simply abbreviated as pasaron cosas, is a phrase that was uttered by Mauricio Macri, former president of Argentina on 17 June 2018 during an interview with Jorge Lanata, well-known for being a fervent opponent of kirchnerism as well of the austere policies of Macri, while trying to justify the worsening of the country's economic situation in the last two months, in which an exchange rate run occurred that culminated in the resignation of the president of the Central Bank of Argentina, Federico Sturzenegger on 14 June, while resigning to the post, it was left an erratic accumulated inflation of 95% and a devaluation of the peso of 175%. By pronouncing the phrase, Macri sought to release the government from any responsibility regarding the country's crisis, stating that it was the product of a greater worldwide situation, in which the world was in a "very volatile financial situation", remainings of the 2008 financial crisis.

The unexpected phrase drew national attention and widespread criticism of the opposition and the middle class. Following harsh criticism, it became an overnight internet meme, national shame of the population, which the term was used as an analogy to a feeling of control and overconfidence of someone, then unexpectedly loses control of the situation, ending with an unexpected ending, or a quick end-a-relationship quote; shaming through the media, such as television programs or newspapers; spawning mocks internet page; a strong impact on the social network Twitter, Instagram and Facebook, becoming a popular national Twitter trend and Twitter accounts; a radio program; a Spotify podcast of current Argentine events; T-shirt sales; and YouTube sketch videos.

== Background ==
During his period as head of government of the city of Buenos Aires during his term (2007-2015), Mauricio Macri, leader of the Republican Proposal centre-right political party (PRO), had pointed out Argentina's inflation on numerous occasions as one of the main shortcomings of the previous two national governments of the Frente para la Victoria (FpV), a centre-left political party led first by Néstor Kirchner's term, and then by his wife, Cristina Kirchner, during 2003 until 2015.

During an interview on Argentine TV program on 30 January 2014, Macri, seen at the time as a potential candidate for the presidency, affirmed that high inflation was a "demonstration of management inability". But on 8 February 2015, during an interview with Canal 26, Macri declared that eliminating inflation would be "the simplest thing he would have to do" if he were to be elected president, he went so far as to promise below-digit inflation by the end of 2017. After his victory in the 2015 Argentine general election and after four months in the office, on 20 March 2016, he affirmed that, if inflation does not go down, his government would take full responsibility and "blame no one."

During his term, however, inflation continued to rise steadily. During the first half of his term, and despite his previous comments, Macri declared that the inability to reduce inflation wasn't the responsibility of his term, but of various "external problems". With this, at the beginning of 2018, after ending 2017 with an inflation of 24.8%, the government changed its economic goals: from 10% in 2018 to 15%, and from 5% in 2019 to 10% but during the second quarter of 2018, a currency crisis unleashed, which led to the collapse of the value of the Argentine peso, the increase in country risk to the second highest in the world and interest rates, becoming one of the highest of the world with 40%, followed far behind by Suriname (25%), Venezuela (21.7%) and Haiti (20%).

The failure of the vain measures taken by the president of the Central Bank of Argentina, Federico Sturzenegger, to combat the crisis, finally led to his resignation on 14 June 2018, Sturzenegger commented that, in his opinion, the reasons given by the president and summarized in the clumsy expression of "things happened" did not cause the crisis, but "the fault lies in the policies that were decided. The deterioration of fiscal policy first, and then the choice to bet on short-term growth, even at the expense of monetary institutions and inflation."

== Interview ==
After Sturzenegger's resignation, Macri granted an interview with journalist Jorge Lanata on the investigative program Periodismo para todos, which was broadcast on 17 June 2018. Lanata asked him if there had been intentional operations in the market to detonate the crisis, to which Macri denied. The president compared the economic model of the previous Kirchner government with the Venezuelan failure and affirmed that the model of his government "respected the rules" as "another country in the world." In the first forty seconds of the interview, which lasted approximately twenty-two minutes, the phrase occurred:

Spanish version:

Lanata: ......del otro lado tenés un montón de gente preocupada por cómo cerró el dólar el viernes [15 de junio] y una sensación —que no sé si es real, vos me dirás— como de pulseada con el gobierno, de "a ver quién gana y quién pierde" esta historia. ¿Tiene nombre eso? ¿Hay gente que está operando en el mercado —gente concreta— que está operando en el mercado para presionar el dólar y que suba?

Macri: No, puede haber, por supuesto, mucha gente que quiere que las cosas vuelvan para atrás, pero esto es más profundo, y a la vez... superficial. El mundo compró una Argentina que se alejaba del "Modelo Venezuela" para ir a un modelo de inclusión, moderna (sic), de la gente, de trabajo, de crecimiento, de desarrollo... respetando reglas. No, diciendo "voy a jugar el mundial de fútbol con catorce jugadores", como hacía el gobierno anterior, "yo invento de vuelta las reglas del mundo". No. Nosotros... somos uno más. Y veníamos bien, pero de golpe pasaron cosas, porque también el mundo está volátil. Y aumentó... un cambio de presidente [sic], se apreció el dólar, aumentaron las tasas de interés, aumentó el petróleo, nosotros seguimos siendo importadores netos de energía...

English traduction:

Lanata: .....on the other side you have a lot of people worried about how the dollar closed on Friday (June 15) and a feeling - which I don't know if it's real, you will tell me - like a struggling with the government, of "let's see who wins and who loses" this story. Does that have a name? Are there people who are operating in the market - specific people - who are operating in the market to pressure the dollar and make it rise?

Macri: No, there can be, of course, many people who want things to go backwards, but this is deeper, and at the same time ... superficial. The world bought an Argentina that was moving away from the "Venezuela model" to go to a model of inclusion, modern (sic), of the people, of work, of growth, of development ... respecting rules. No, saying "going to play the World Cup with fourteen players", as the previous government did, "I bring back the rules of the world." No. We ... are one more. And we were doing well, but suddenly things happened, because the world is also volatile. And it increased ... a change of president [sic], the dollar depreciated, interest rates increased, oil increased, we are still net importers of energy...

== Aftermath ==
The phrase was the subject of numerous criticisms from the entire population, mainly from the peronist opposition and the overwhelmed and impoverished middle class, including a press release from an independent intellectual group "La Fragata", which quickly became an internet meme. After a year of the phrase, some Argentine media continued to remember the expression and used it to criticize their government. A radio program hosted by economist Alejandro Bercovich on the station Radio con Vos, a current radio channel, launched on 11 September 2018 bears the name Pasaron cosas as a reminder of the president's phrase and the stunned reaction of the population, even his followers.

In addition, Macri's phrase served as a title for a book of social criticism by the Argentine announcer, humorist and influencer Pedro Rosenblat, as well as being a subject of study as an example of the "failure of Argentine neoliberalism", adding that it was too early for a centre-right government to wipe out "70 years of Peronist political control", since Macri was the first democratic elected president in almost a century who wasn't either a Radical or a Peronist. Since then, the phrase is usually used in the media or social networks to refer to a negative turn of events for a person or entity that occurs suddenly, after a period prolonged due to prosperity or advantage, as seen in the first half of his term. During the 2019 elections, he was considered the worst candidate in the entire election, based on deep disgust of the public opinion. When he lost the election, he left office with the lowest popularity ratings in the history of Argentina, with 38%. During a survey, he was considered as the second worst president in the Argentine history, only surpassed by Cristina Kirchner.

== See also ==
- Mistakes were made
- Politics of Argentina
- Macrismo
- 2018 Argentine monetary crisis
- 2019 Argentine general election
