= Non-denial denial =

Statement that seems to deny an accusation but does not

A non-denial denial is a statement that, at first hearing, seems to be a direct denial of some allegation or accusation, but after being parsed carefully turns out not to be a denial at all, and is thus not explicitly untruthful if the allegation is in fact correct. It is a case in which words that are literally true are used to convey a false impression; analysis of whether or when such behavior constitutes lying is a long-standing issue in ethics. British newspaper The Sunday Times has defined it as "an on-the-record statement, usually made by a politician, repudiating a journalist's story, but in such a way as to leave open the possibility that it is actually true".

== Origin and history of the phrase ==
The Washington Post editor Ben Bradlee "is credited with coining the phrase non-denial denial to characterize the evasive Oval Office answers to questions."

The phrase was popularized during the Watergate scandal by Bob Woodward and Carl Bernstein in their 1974 book All the President's Men, in reference to evasive statements and equivocal denials by then-Attorney General John N. Mitchell.

William Goldman's screenplay for the 1976 film adaptation put the phrase into the mouth of Ben Bradlee and used it for dramatic purpose. The Bradlee character looks at some White House releases and comments "All non-denial denials. We're dirty, guys, and they doubt we were ever virgins, but they don't say the story is inaccurate." Later, Bradlee worries about the accuracy of a story and asks the reporters "That didn't sound to me like a non-denial denial. Could you have been wrong?" But when other editors suggest that the paper needs to back down, Bradlee writes a note that says "We stand by our story," which he calls "My non-denial denial"; then he adds, "Fuck it, we'll stand by the boys."

A 1976 newspaper article called an Olympic official's statement on blood doping "a non-denial denial, a Watergate denial", while a 2003 assessment of Ron Ziegler's career dubbed him "the non-denial denier" and placed his tenure as White House Press Secretary in "the Alice-in-Wonderland era that spawned the form of official evasion that came to be known as the non-denial denial".

== Examples ==
=== Tony Blair ===
Another example, characterized by the BBC as a "non-denial denial", was provided by Tony Blair, who was interviewed in 1997, just before the general election, by the British newspaper Evening Standard. The question was: "Will Labour introduce tuition fees for higher education?" Blair's answer was: "Labour has no plans to introduce tuition fees for higher education." No plans does not mean no tuition fees, nor even that there was no intention to introduce them, perhaps only that the plan for this was not finalized. The Labour Party used the same ambiguous wording in its manifesto for the election in 2001, writing: "We will not introduce 'top-up' fees and have legislated to prevent them." The increase of university fees up to £3000 was voted for before the next election in 2005, but implemented in 2006. Therefore, the British government explained that the manifesto in 2001 was only valid for the period up to the election in 2005.

=== Mark McGwire ===
Investigative journalists Lance Williams and Mark Fainaru-Wada used the phrase in their 2006 book Game of Shadows to characterize an ambiguous response by retired major league baseball star Mark McGwire during a congressional hearing on steroids in baseball:

McGwire turned evasive. He had nothing to say about anything. Pressed about whether he had used performance-enhancing drugs, he responded over and over again, "I'm not here to talk about the past." The refrain became so pathetic and predictable that McGwire was mocked by some of the politicians, while the audience chuckled each time he uttered his non-denial denial.

=== Bruce Edwards Ivins ===
Statements allegedly made in 2008 by the US biodefence researcher Bruce Edwards Ivins have been characterized by the FBI as "non-denial denials". Ivins was the chief suspect in the investigation into the 2001 anthrax attacks on US media outlets and senators. In 2008, he was involuntarily committed to a psychiatric hospital, where the FBI later said his statements included the following.

- "I can tell you I don't have it in my heart to kill anybody"
- "I do not have any recollection of ever have doing anything like that. As a matter of fact, I don't have no clue how to, how to make a bio-weapon and I don't want to know."
- "I can tell you, I am not a killer at heart"
- "If I found out I was involved in some way, and, and ..."
- "I don't think of myself as a vicious, a, a nasty evil person."
- "I don't like to hurt people, accidentally, in, in any way. And [several named scientists] wouldn't do that. And I, in my right mind wouldn't do it [laughs] ... But it's still, but I still feel responsibility because it [the anthrax] wasn't locked up at the time ..."

The FBI said these alleged remarks suggested that Ivins, who they said had suffered from long-term mental health problems, had been the perpetrator of the attacks. However, he died before charges were brought against him (a suicide, according to the FBI).

== See also ==
- Denial
- Evasion (ethics)
- "Follow the money", a phrase from All the President's Men
- "Mistakes were made", an evasive phrasing sometimes known as the "past exonerative" linguistic tense
- Non-apology apology
- Shermanesque statement, the opposite of a dissembling statement, contrasted by its explicit directness and clarity
- Spin (public relations)
