= Central American Road Network =

- Network route marker

System information
- Maintained by each country within their borders.
- Length: 6,525 km (4,054 mi)
- Formed: c. 1952

Central American Road Network is a series of international roads connecting the seven Central American countries of Guatemala, Belize, Honduras, El Salvador, Nicaragua, Costa Rica, and Panama. The network is important to trade throughout the region and the daily lives of the inhabitants. The network is made of the national roads of each country, rural roads, and the Pan-American Highway.

Central America contains more than 148,000 kilometers (91,963 miles) of road, 6,525 kilometers (4,054 miles) of which are a part of the Central American road network. The network faces many problems including the lack of safety, modernity, and maintenance due to low funding for the network. As of 2025 the Central American Bank for Economic Integration approved funding for projects in the region that modernize the network, including a 2035 master plan which was worked on in collaboration with the Central American Integration System, Japan International Cooperation Agency, and other organizations.

Road Network
Route	Length (km)	Length (mi)	Southern or western terminus	Northern or eastern terminus	Countries
	2,461				Guatemala El Salvador Honduras Nicaragua Costa Rica Panama
	674				Guatemala El Salvador
	259				Honduras Nicaragua
	384				Guatemala El Salvador Honduras
	418				Honduras
	170				Honduras Nicaragua
	193				El Salvador Honduras
	91				Guatemala El Salvador
	404				Guatemala El Salvador
	118				Guatemala Honduras
	278				Guatemala Honduras
	152				Guatemala El Salvador
	795				Guatemala Honduras
	128				Guatemala
