= Mistakes were made =

Rhetorical device

"Mistakes were made" is an expression that is commonly used as a rhetorical device, whereby a speaker acknowledges that a situation was handled poorly or inappropriately but seeks to evade any direct admission or accusation of responsibility. The acknowledgement of "mistakes" is framed in an abstract sense, with no direct reference to who made the mistakes, or the nature and extent of them. A less evasive construction might be along the lines of "I made mistakes" or "John Doe made mistakes"; a similar active existential construction might be "mistakes happened". The speaker neither accepts personal responsibility nor accuses anyone else. The word "mistakes" also does not imply intent.

The New York Times has called the phrase a "classic Washington linguistic construct". Political scientist William Schneider suggested that this usage be referred to as the "past exonerative" tense, and commentator William Safire has defined the phrase as "[a] passive-evasive way of acknowledging error while distancing the speaker from responsibility for it". A commentator at NPR declared this expression to be "the king of non-apologies". While perhaps most famous in politics, the phrase has also been used in business, sports, and entertainment.

This type of evasive rhetoric became widely embraced as a standard practice for politicians, businesses, and public figures; despite some mockery of the phrase, its current acceptance is a notorious contrast to the harsh criticism that repeatedly targeted Ron Ziegler, former press officer of U.S. President Nixon's administration.

== Notable political usages ==
=== United States ===
- United States President Ulysses S. Grant, in his December 5, 1876, report to the U.S. Congress, acknowledged the scandals engulfing his administration by writing that "mistakes have been made, as all can see and I admit it".
- United States President Richard Nixon used the phrase several times in reference to wrongdoings by his own electoral organization and presidential administration.
- On May 1, 1973, White House Press Secretary Ron Ziegler stated "I would apologize to the Post, and I would apologize to Mr. Woodward and Mr. Bernstein" (referring to Bob Woodward and Carl Bernstein of The Washington Post). He continued, "We would all have to say that mistakes were made in terms of comments. I was overenthusiastic in my comments about the Post, particularly if you look at them in the context of developments that have taken place." The previous day, White House counsel John Dean and Nixon aides John Ehrlichman and H. R. Haldeman had resigned, as the Watergate scandal progressed.
- On January 27, 1987, U.S. President Ronald Reagan used the phrase in the State of the Union Address while discussing contacts with Iran in what came to be known as the arms-for-hostages scandal within the Iran–Contra affair. He said, in part: "And certainly it was not wrong to try to secure freedom for our citizens held in barbaric captivity. But we did not achieve what we wished, and serious mistakes were made in trying to do so. We will get to the bottom of this, and I will take whatever action is called for."
- In October 1995, the U.S. Advisory Committee on Human Radiation Experiments released its final report, indicating that "wrongs were done" in some of the experiments, including a top-secret test from 1945 to 1947 during which 18 American citizens were injected with plutonium without their knowledge or consent.
- CNN and The New York Times reported U.S. President Bill Clinton's January 28, 1997, admission that "mistakes were made" with respect to Democratic Party fundraising scandals. "[Clinton] acknowledged that the White House should not have invited the nation's senior banking regulator to a meeting where Mr. Clinton and prominent bankers discussed banking policy in the presence of the Democratic Party's senior fund-raiser. 'Mistakes were made here by people who either did it deliberately or inadvertently,' he said."
- Speaking in London in April 2002, former U.S. Secretary of State Henry Kissinger commented on the refused request of a Spanish judge to question Kissinger in an investigation of war crimes and crimes against humanity in the matter of Operation Condor, stating "it is quite possible that mistakes were made."
- On May 5, 2004, U.S. President George W. Bush commented on the Abu Ghraib torture and prisoner abuse scandal: "It's also important for the people of Iraq to know that in a democracy, everything is not perfect, that mistakes are made. But in a democracy, as well, those mistakes will be investigated and people will be brought to justice."
- On December 4, 2005, U.S. Senator John McCain commented about the Iraq War: "I think that one of the many mistakes that have been made is to inflate the expectations of the American people beginning three years ago that this was going to be some kind of day at the beach" and then referring to the president "he admitted that errors have been made." The show's host, Tim Russert, pressed for specific culpability: "Isn't that the president's failure? He's the commander in chief." McCain responded: "Well, I – all of the responsibility lies in everybody in positions of responsibility. Serious mistakes are made in every war. Serious mistakes were made in this one, but I really believe that there is progress being made, that we can be guardedly optimistic."
- In October 2006, in regard to a NATO air strike which unintentionally killed approximately 70 Afghan civilians, International Security Assistance Force commander General David Richards said that "in the night in the fog of war, mistakes were made."
- In a November 2006 Vanity Fair article, Richard Perle used the phrase to refer to the Iraq War, claiming that "mistakes were made, and I want to be very clear on this: They were not made by neoconservatives, who had almost no voice in what happened, and certainly almost no voice in what happened after the downfall of the regime in Baghdad."
- On March 14, 2007, United States Attorney General Alberto Gonzales used the line to explain the firing of eight U.S. attorneys, for which Gonzalez received significant criticism. He later resigned.
- In March 2009, Jamie Dimon, chief executive officer of JPMorgan Chase, said in a CNBC interview that "[w]e know mistakes were made", referring to controversial bonuses paid to executives of the company after it received taxpayer-funded support via the Troubled Asset Relief Program.
- On May 10, 2013, the Internal Revenue Service, in a statement apologizing for the alleged improper targeting of conservative groups for audits during the 2012 United States presidential election, said that "[m]istakes were made initially, but they were in no way due to any political or partisan rationale."
- On January 14, 2014, New Jersey Governor Chris Christie, during his State of the State address, said "mistakes were clearly made" in reference to the George Washington Bridge lane closure scandal.
- On May 12, 2015, the 2016 U.S. Republican Party presidential candidate Jeb Bush could not fully commit to an answer when asked if he would have voted to authorize the Iraq War in 2002, using the phrase "simple fact is, mistakes were made" on Sean Hannity's radio show. He was lambasted by both liberals and conservatives for his answer.
- On November 9, 2023, Monique Owens, mayor of Eastpointe, Michigan, was sentenced for making a false statement on a business grant application. Owens told the court that there were "mistakes made by many people".
- On July 30, 2024, Sen. Rand Paul (R-KY) said, "Finally, let me close with this. Grave mistakes were made on July 13th, but that does not take away from the bravery of dozens of Federal, State, and local officers that day. We are grateful for their sacrifices and professionalism. They deserve the truth. Now, also, it is our duty and our utmost responsibility to ensure that we learn from this failure and hold those responsible accountable."
- On July 26, 2026, Sen. Mark Kelly (D-AZ) said in response to a question about whether he agrees with New york City Mayor Zohran Mamdani's description of Israeli PM Netanyahu as a war criminal: "I’m not happy with the decisions that the prime minister of Israel has made over the last few years. The way they conducted the operations in Gaza, there were a lot of mistakes made. That being said, Israel is an ally of ours. We support the Israeli people. I’m going to always stand by Israel as a nation.”

=== South America ===
- Argentine President Mauricio Macri, on June 17, 2018, in an interview, justified the worsening economic crisis of the country engulfing his administration by commenting that "we were going well, but suddenly things happened".

=== United Kingdom ===
- In the BBC documentary Blair & Brown: The New Labour Revolution (Episode 4, 45:00), released on October 4, 2021, former British Prime Minister Tony Blair said of the lack of a proper plan after the 2003 invasion of Iraq: "No one can possibly dispute there were serious mistakes made."
- On October 18, 2022, British Prime Minister Liz Truss, during an interview with the BBC, said she was "sorry for the mistakes that have been made" in reference to the September 2022 United Kingdom mini-budget.
- On October 25, 2022, Rishi Sunak, in his first statement as British Prime Minister and Truss's successor, said "some mistakes were made" in reference to Truss.

=== Australia ===
- On May 23, 2023, David Littleproud, leader of the National Party of Australia, said "mistakes were made" during the European colonisation of Australia, while speaking about the upcoming 2023 Australian Indigenous Voice Referendum.

== Parody, comedic, and other usages ==
An early parody of the phrase appears in Matt Groening's Life in Hell cartoon strip. Groening draws a looming shadow of the rabbit named Binky, towering over his one-eared son, Bongo, who has clearly made a total mess of the house. Bongo uselessly says: "Mistakes were made." This cartoon coincided with Reagan's use of the excuse in 1987, regarding the Iran-Contra Affair.

In the TV mini-series Son of the Morning Star, Captain Frederick Benteen uses this line to explain Custer's defeat at the Battle of the Little Bighorn.

Playwright Craig Wright wrote a 2006 episode for ABC's drama series Brothers & Sisters, called "Mistakes Were Made, Part One" (with Jon Robin Baitz). He expanded the gag into a one-man play starring Michael Shannon, Mistakes Were Made, performed off-Broadway in 2009, to mixed reviews.

The phrase was also used in the multiplayer portion of the Call of Duty: Black Ops series referring to a player dying in a variety of ways not caused by an enemy player, such as falling from a great height, being crushed or the negligent use of grenades.

The phrase is often used by the character Timmy Failure, and is also the subtitle of the first book.

== See also ==
- Cover your ass (CYA)
- Non-apology apology
- Non-denial denial
- Officer-involved shooting
- Passive voice
- Spin (public relations)
