= Paltering =

Deceptive argument style

Paltering is the active use of selective truthful statements to mislead.

The term as applied in psychology and mediation studies was developed by researchers at the John F. Kennedy School of Government in the late 2000s. The first known use of palter to describe acting insincerely or deceitfully was in the 1580s.

Paltering is considered both more serious and more common than a lie of omission (a passive failure to correct a wrong statement). Paltering differs from a lie of omission in the following way, as described by Todd Rogers of the Kennedy School: When selling a used car with engine trouble, a lie of omission would be a silent failure to correct a buyer who said, "I presume the car is in excellent shape and the engine runs well". On the other hand paltering would involve deceiving the buyer by responding to "has this car ever had mechanical issues?" with statements such as "I drove it yesterday in 5-below temperatures and it drove well". The statement does not directly answer the question posed by the buyer, but instead gives the impression of an answer, specifically "the car does not have mechanical issues".

People who palter often believe it is less unethical than outright lying.

== Usage ==
Paltering appears to be common in negotiations. More than half of 184 business executives surveyed in a study by the Kennedy School admitted that they had paltered. Among those who did, most told the researchers they paltered to get a better deal. But the practice is risky, because when it is caught, it causes conflict, reduces trust and undermines relationships.

Politicians sometimes palter to dodge questions in a debate.

== See also ==
- Evasion (ethics)
- Lie of omission
- Disinformation
