= Alfonso Prat-Gay =

Argentine economist and politician

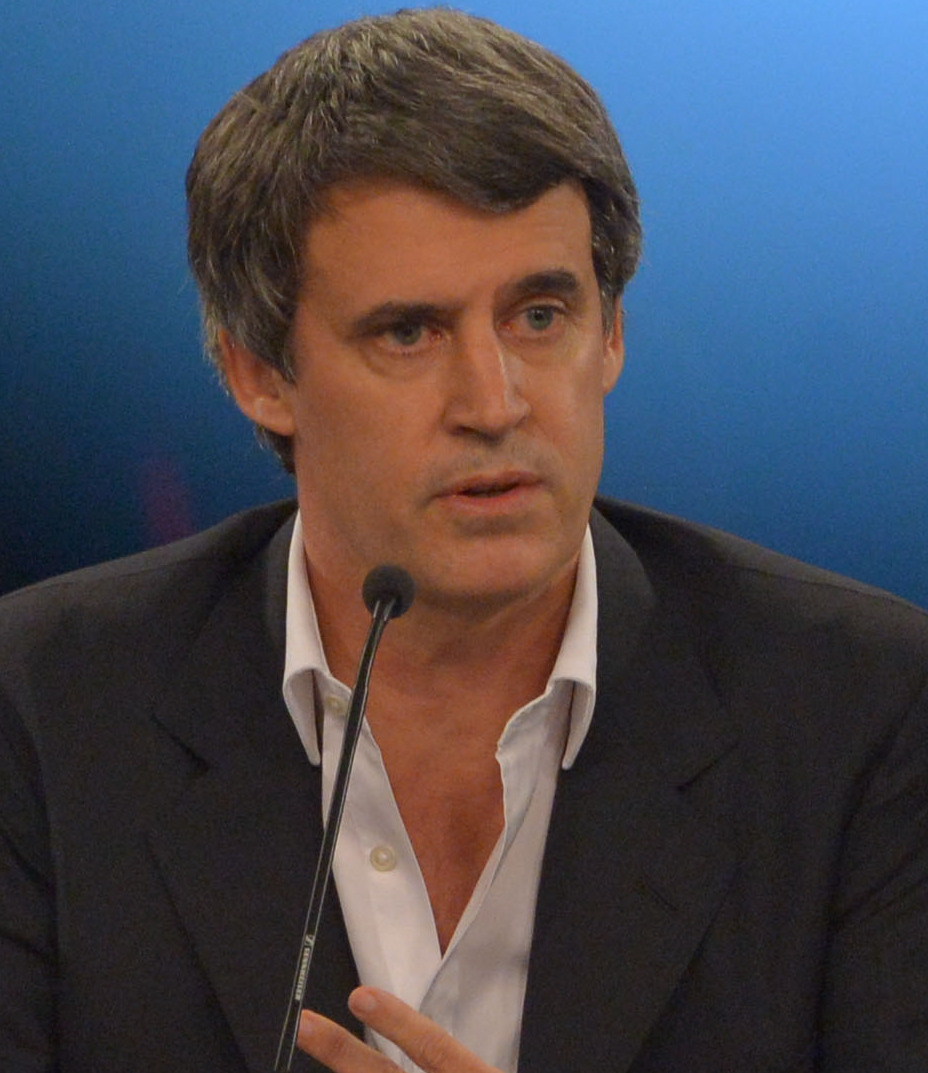

Minister of the Treasury and Public Finances of Argentina
- In office 10 December 2015 – 2 January 2017
- President: Mauricio Macri
- Preceded by: Axel Kicillof
- Succeeded by: Luis Caputo (Finance); Nicolás Dujovne (Treasury)

President of the Central Bank
- In office 11 December 2002 – 24 September 2004
- Preceded by: Aldo Pignanelli
- Succeeded by: Martín Redrado

National Deputy
- In office 10 December 2009 – 10 December 2013
- Constituency: City of Buenos Aires

Personal details
- Born: 24 November 1965 (age 60) Buenos Aires, Argentina
- Party: Civic Coalition ARI (2009-2013); Radical Civic Union (2015–present)
- Other political affiliations: Cambiemos (2015–present); Broad Front UNEN (2013); Social and Civic Agreement (2009–2013)
- Education: Pontifical Catholic University of Argentina; University of Pennsylvania
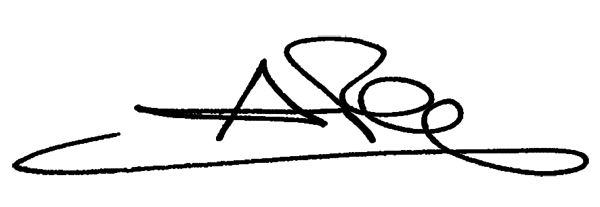
- Signature

Alfonso de Prat-Gay (Spanish pronunciation: [alˈfonso ðe ˈpɾat ˈɡai̯]; born 24 November 1965) is an Argentine economist and politician. Following the election of Mauricio Macri to the presidency on 2015, he became Minister of Economy.

He was also president of the Central Bank of Argentina from December 2002 to September 2004, and was elected National Deputy for the Civic Coalition in the 2009 elections.

A decade later, as Minister of Economy in the Macri administration, he lifted four-year-old capital controls on the Argentine currency, a mere six days after taking office.

His work earned him Euromoney's Central Bank Governor of the Year award. Prat-Gay is also a member of the Washington D.C.–based think tank the Inter-American Dialogue.

He is considered an orthodox liberal who has a good image in the markets and fluent contacts abroad. However, Prat-Gay has been a political ally to leftist Victoria Donda and some economists like Javier Milei consider him to be a socialist or a socialdemocrat.

== Career ==
Prat-Gay was born in Buenos Aires in 1965, the son of Jorge Prat-Gay. He earned a degree in economics from the Universidad Católica Argentina in 1989, and obtained his master's degree in 1994 at the University of Pennsylvania, where he was a PhD candidate.

== Finances ==
In 1994, Prat-Gay joined JP Morgan in New York City and went on to work for the bank in its Buenos Aires and London branches until 2001. He co-founded APL Economía, an economic consulting firm.

Prat-Gay is Chairman of Tilton Capital, an asset management company he co-founded in 2005 with Pedro Lacoste. He is president of Fundación Andares para el desarrollo de las Microfinanzas ("Andares Foundation for the Development of Microfinances"). His clients at Tilton Capital included the late María Amalia Lacroze de Fortabat, former chairperson of Argentina's largest concrete manufacturer, Loma Negra. Prat-Gay's work for Mrs. Fortabat came under scrutiny after revelations that Tilton Capital facilitated tax evasion and capital flight for Fortabat and other clients, including the entirety of Mrs. Fortabat's billion-dollar payout for her sale of Loma Negra in 2005. The vice president of JP Morgan Argentina at the time, Hernán Arbizu, declared that Prat-Gay managed much of this wealth in an offshore hedge fund of his creation with put options against the Argentine peso. He was appointed executor of the Lacroze de Fortabat estate following Mrs. Fortabat's death in 2012.

== Politics ==
In December 2002, Prat-Gay was named president of the Central Bank of Argentina, at only 37 years of age, and served until September 24, 2004. He won the 2004 Euromoney Central Bank Governor of the Year award for his work for having reduced the inflation from 40% to 5% while maintaining an economic growth of 8%. He completed his term and rejected President Néstor Kirchner's offer to renew his position for another six-year term, due to disagreements with the president on the independence of the Central Bank, anti-inflationary policies, and on negotiations on defaulted bonds.

He joined the Civic Coalition, led at the time by Elisa Carrió, and was named as Carrió's choice for Minister of the Economy had she won the 2007 presidential election.

Prat-Gay led the Civic Coalition's party list for the city of Buenos Aires in the 2009 congressional elections, and was handily elected. As a Congressman, he worked on projects such as increasing banking security, preventing money laundering and drug trafficking, and an extensive deregulation of the Argentine financial system. He was a main voice of the opposition in Congress on economic issues. He was named head of the Civic Coalition caucus in the Lower House following Elisa Carrió's poor showing in the 2011 presidential election.

Prat-Gay co-founded the Juntos UNEN ('Together They Unite') alliance with centrist UCR Congressional caucus leader Ricardo Gil Lavedra, and Victoria Donda of the leftist Freemen of the South Movement in January 2013. He declared his candidacy in July for a seat in the Argentine Senate ahead of the 2013 mid-term elections.

== Minister of Treasury and Finances ==
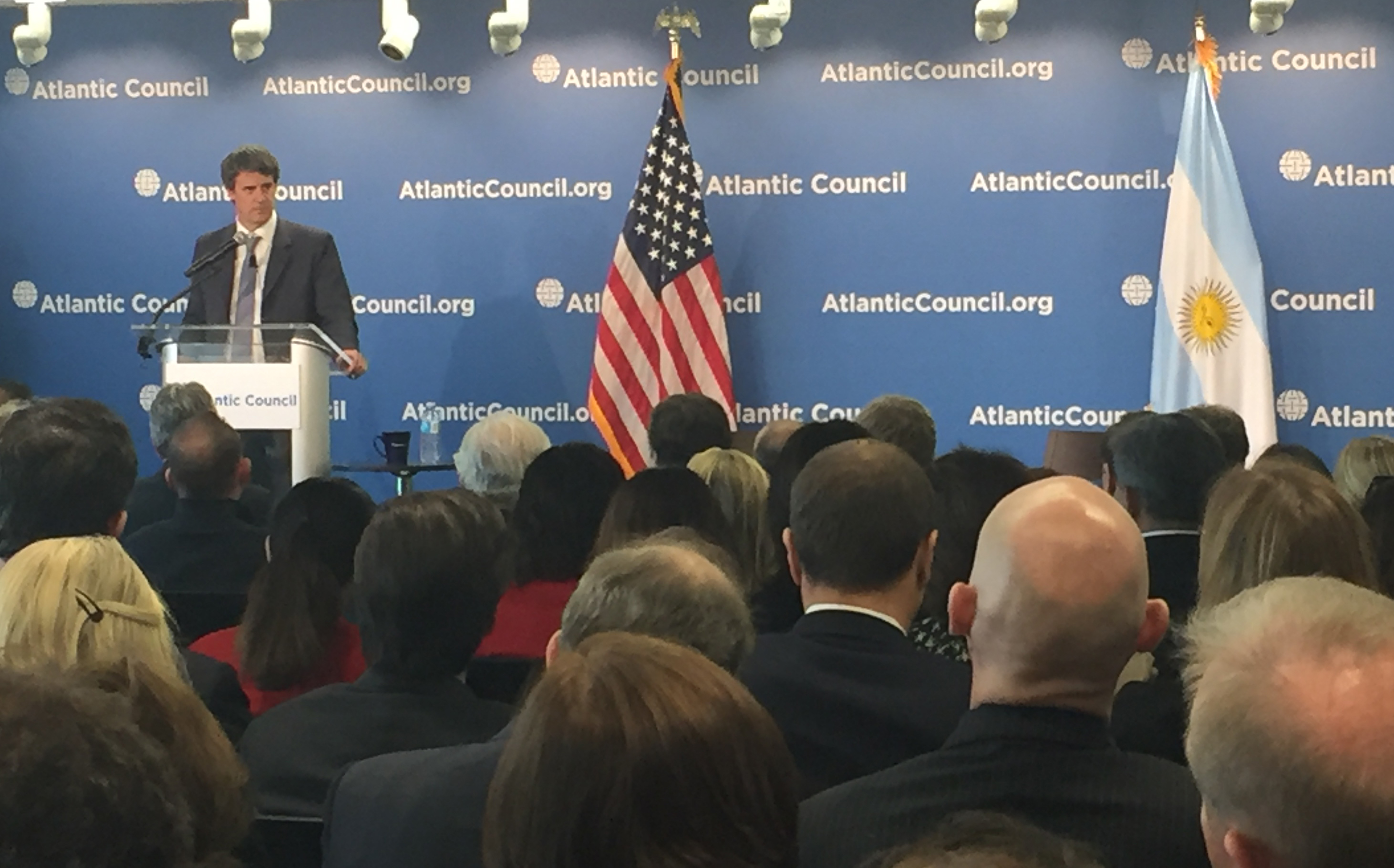
Minister Alfonso Prat-Gay takes part in meetings with the IMF and the World Bank, shortly after the end of the Argentine default.

Prat-Gay was appointed minister of treasury and public finance in December 2015, by the new president Mauricio Macri.

One of the first changes to economic policy from the Macri administration, just seven days after he had taken office, was to remove the currency controls that had been in place for four consecutive years. The move signified a 30% devaluation of the peso, and was met with both criticism and praise.

Prat Gay eliminated export taxes on wheat, corn, meat and fishing, the industry and mining, while it promised to lower the tariff on soy 5% every year.

For the next year, he eliminated the Advance Affidavits of Importation (an import control program) and extended Careful Pricing (a price control program) for six months.

Since 2016, began the removal of energy subsidies (for electricity, gas and water) and transport subsidies (for bus, train and subway), which caused a huge increase in prices. He avoided to use a shock therapy and introduced the changes gradually.

On January 19, Prat Gay and Macri went to the World Economic Forum in Davos, Switzerland with Sergio Massa and part of his cabinet looking for investments. He had meetings with various business representatives, politicians and journalists. Some of them were US vice president Joe Biden, the prime minister of the United Kingdom, David Cameron, the founder of Virgin Group Richard Branson, CEO of Google Eric Schmidt, the queen of the Netherlands, president and CEO Coca-Cola, Muhtar Kent among others. It was the first time that Argentina participates since 2003. The last president was Eduardo Duhalde.

He successfully ended the sovereign default declared in 2001. Prat Gay returned Argentina to the internacional capital markets and helped to restore international relations.

"Argentina is back, and I hope you enjoy it."
— Minister Prat-Gay at the Atlantic Council, Washington, D.C., U.S., on April 14, 2016

Political intervention in the INDEC figures ended, and the IMF declared in November 2016 that Argentine statistics were again in accordance with international standards.

Among the most notorious vulnerabilities of the administration was an extremely high inflation rate: it was 40% in 2016 (while the Central Bank expected an inflation rate of 17% for 2017, 10% for 2018 and 5% for 2019).

He had conflicting views of the economy with Federico Sturzenegger, president of the Central Bank of Argentina.

By demand of president Macri, he resigned on December 26, 2016, and was succeeded by Nicolás Dujovne.

Civic offices
Preceded by Aldo Pignanelli	President of the Central Bank; 2002–2004	Succeeded by Martín Redrado
Political offices
Preceded by Axel Kicillof	Minister of the Economy; 2015–2016	Succeeded by Luis Caputo as Minister of Finance
Preceded by Axel Kicillof	Minister of the Economy; 2015–2016	Succeeded by Nicolás Dujovne as Minister of the Treasury
