= Non-apology =

Purported apology that lacks remorse

A non-apology, sometimes called a backhanded apology, empty apology, nonpology, or fauxpology, is a statement in the form of an apology that does not express remorse for what was done or said, or assigns fault to those ostensibly receiving the apology. It is common in politics and public relations.

For instance, saying "I'm sorry you feel that way" to someone who has been offended by a statement is a non-apology apology. It does not admit there was anything wrong with the remarks made, and blames the recipient by implying they were overly sensitive or took offense for irrational reasons. Another form of non-apology does not apologize directly to the injured or insulted party, but generically "to anyone who might have been offended".

Statements of pseudo-apology that do not communicate responsibility for words or deeds may be meaningful expressions of regret, but such statements can also be used to elicit forgiveness without acknowledging fault.

== As a tactic ==
Typologies of apology note they cover a range of situations and degrees of regret, remorse, and contrition, and that success is to be gauged by the result of the apology rather than the degree of contrition involved. Deborah Levi offers the following possibilities:

Tactical apology
when a person accused of wrongdoing offers an apology that is rhetorical and strategic—and not necessarily heartfelt
Explanation apology
when a person accused of wrongdoing offers an apology that is merely a gesture that is meant to counter an accusation of wrongdoing; in fact, it may be used to defend the actions of the accused
Formalistic apology
when a person accused of wrongdoing offers an apology after being admonished to do so by an authority figure—who may also be the individual who suffered the wrongdoing
Happy ending apology
when a person accused of wrongdoing fully acknowledges responsibility for the wrongdoing and is genuinely remorseful

While the non-apology apology is clearly unsuited to situations where an expression of remorse, contrition, and future change are obviously desirable (e.g. the "happy ending" apology), it may prove extremely useful in situations where little can be done to assuage the apparent offence or prevent its repetition, as when an airline apologises for a delay, in the full knowledge that a future repetition is inevitable. Such tactical apologies may have beneficial effects simply through the validation of the emotions of the offended party: they answer the basic human need for disagreeable emotions to be recognised and acknowledged as important, while protecting the apparently offending party from an expression of remorse. Negotiators often use this tactic to calm tense situations: "an apology can defuse emotions effectively, even when you do not acknowledge personal responsibility for the action or admit an intention to harm. An apology may be one of the least costly and most rewarding investments you can make."

== Legal significance ==
=== United States ===
Non-apology apologizers may be trying to avoid litigation that might result from an admission of guilt or responsibility. Many states, including Massachusetts and California, have laws to prevent a plaintiff from using an apology as evidence of liability. For example, a medical doctor may apologize to a patient for a bad outcome without fearing the apology can be used against them at trial as evidence of negligence.

=== Canada ===
In November 2008, the Alberta legislature passed an amendment to the existing Alberta Evidence Act, R.S.A. 2000, c. A-18, geared at protecting apologizing parties from risks of legal liability and loss of insurance coverage. Section 26.1 of the Act provides that an apology does not constitute an express or implied admission of fault or liability. British Columbia passed similar legislation in 2006, being the Apology Act, S.B.C. 2006, c. 19.

== Examples ==
=== "Mistakes were made" ===
The expression "mistakes were made" is commonly used as a rhetorical device, whereby a speaker acknowledges a situation was handled poorly or inappropriately but seeks to evade any direct admission or accusation of responsibility by using the passive voice. The acknowledgement of "mistakes" is framed in an abstract sense with no direct reference to who made the mistakes. An active voice construction would be along the lines of "I made mistakes" or "John Doe made mistakes." The speaker neither accepts personal responsibility nor accuses anyone else. The word "mistakes" also does not imply intent.

The New York Times has called the phrase a "classic Washington linguistic construct". Political consultant William Schneider suggested this usage be referred to as the "past exonerative" tense, and commentator William Safire has defined the phrase as "[a] passive-evasive way of acknowledging error while distancing the speaker from responsibility for it". A commentator at NPR declared this expression to be "the king of non-apologies". While perhaps most famous in politics, the phrase has also been used in business, sports, and entertainment.

=== Ifpology ===
Attorney and business ethics expert Lauren Bloom, author of The Art of the Apology, mentions the "if apology" as a favorite of politicians, with lines such as "I apologize if I offended anyone". Comedian Harry Shearer has coined the term ifpology for its frequent appearances on "The Apologies of the Week" segment of Le Show.

One of the first references was in The New York Times by Richard Mooney in his 1992 editorial notebook "If This Sounds Slippery ... How to Apologize and Admit Nothing". This was mainly in regard to Senator Bob Packwood: "Only in the event that someone should choose to take offense, why then he's sorry". Mooney goes on to cite Bill Clinton, who said of Mario Cuomo: "If the remarks on the tape left anyone with the impression that I was disrespectful to either Governor Cuomo or Italian-Americans, then I deeply regret it." A famous example involved racially insensitive remarks made by golfer Fuzzy Zoeller about Tiger Woods: "It's too bad that something I said in jest was turned into something it's not. But I didn't mean anything by it and I'm sorry if I offend anybody. If Tiger is offended by it, I apologize to him, too. I have nothing but the utmost respect for Tiger as a person and an athlete."; Zoeller's comments and his half-hearted ifpology were news for days and resulted in his being dropped from a commercial tie-in with K-Mart. According to John Kador in Effective Apology, "Adding the word if or any other conditional modifier to an apology makes it a non-apology."

A 2014 ifpology was made by CNN's Don Lemon, who said, "If my question to [Joan Tarshis] struck anyone as offensive, I am sorry, as that certainly was not my intention." This was about a question during his interview with Tarshis where he suggested biting a penis as a way to avoid being orally sexually assaulted.

On September 16, 2015, Matt Damon made what Salon termed a "non-apology" apology when he said, "I am sorry that [my comments] offended some people, but, at the very least, I am happy that they started a conversation about diversity in Hollywood." This was in reference to the backlash against Damon after he made comments about diversity to African American film producer Effie Brown on the September 13, 2015 debut of the HBO show Project Greenlight that were criticized as condescending.

=== Other versions ===
On July 24, 1991, The New York Times reported Australian foreign minister Gareth Evans had offered the prime minister of Malaysia "what might best be described as a non-apology apology" for what the Malaysian government regarded as an insulting portrayal of Malaysia in an Australian television series, Embassy. Speaking to journalists, Evans said he had "wanted to acknowledge fault where such acknowledgment is appropriate".

Speaking on the floor of the U.S. House of Representatives in July 2020, Rep. Alexandria Ocasio-Cortez dismissed what she called a non-apology apology from Rep. Ted Yoho for describing her as a "fucking bitch". After the story went public, Yoho had apologized for the "abrupt manner of the conversation" he had with her but denied having used those words.

=== Sarcastic examples ===
Humorist Bruce McCall, in a 2001 New York Times piece entitled "The Perfect Non-apology Apology", defined the term as referring to "sufficiently artful double talk" designed to enable one to "get what you want by seeming to express regret while actually accepting no blame," and suggested some tongue-in-cheek apologies, such as:

Nobody is sorrier than me that the police officer had to spend his valuable time writing out a parking ticket on my car. Though from my personal standpoint I know for a certainty that the meter had not yet expired, please accept my expression of deep regret at this unfortunate incident.

== See also ==
- Equivocation
- Evasion (ethics)
- Logical fallacies
- Non-denial denial
- Spin (propaganda)
- Thoughts and prayers
- Weasel words
