= Miguel Braun =

Argentine economist and policy maker

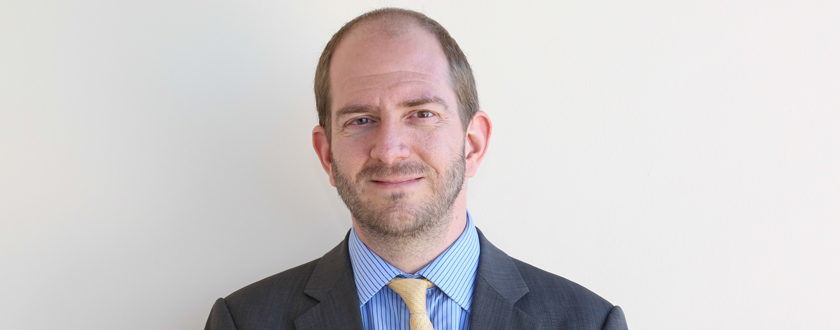
- Miguel Braun in 2015

Executive Director for Argentina and Haiti at the Inter-American Development Bank
- Incumbent
- Assumed office 1 february 2024
- Preceded by: Marcelo Daniel Barg

Secretary of Economic Policy of the Argentine Republic
- In office 4 october 2018 – 9 september 2019
- Preceded by: Guido Sandleris
- Succeeded by: Sebastián Katz

Secretary of Commerce of the Argentine Republic
- In office 10 december 2015 – 4 october 2018
- Preceded by: Augusto Costa
- Succeeded by: Ignacio Werner

Personal details
- Born: 30 November 1973 (age 52) Buenos Aires, Argentina
- Party: Republican Proposal
- Education: University of San Andrés
- Occupation: Economist

Miguel Braun Cortés (born November 30, 1973) is an Argentine economist and policymaker who served was Secretary of Commerce of the Ministry of Production (2015–2018) and Secretary of Economic Policy of the Ministry of Finance (2018–2019) of the Argentine Republic.

He currently serves as the executive director of the Inter-American Development Bank representing Argentina and Haiti.

== Biography ==
Braun holds a bachelor's degree, summa cum laude, in Economics from University of San Andrés. He graduated with honors in 1996.

He continued his postgraduate studies in the United States. He obtained a PhD in Economics from Harvard University.

Between 2000 and 2003, he was a member of the Academic Council of Universidad of San Andrés, as well as a professor of Economic Policy, Banking Theory and Macroeconomics. He also worked as a professor at the Torcuato di Tella University and at the University of Buenos Aires.

== Professional activity ==
In 2000, he was co-founder of CIPPEC (Center for the Implementation of Public Policy for Equity and Growth), where he worked as Director of Fiscal Policy (2000–2006) and executive director (2007–2010).

He has served as an economic consultant to the World Bank, Inter-American Development Bank, CELAC, UNICEF and the Ministry of Economy (Argentina), among others.

Between 2010 and 2015, he served as the executive director of Pensar Foundation.

In February 2013, he was appointed as Director of Bank of the City of Buenos Aires, a position he held until December 2015.

== Political career ==
On December 10, 2015, was appointed Secretary of Commerce of the Argentine Republic, a then dependent body of the Ministry of Production. He held this position until October 4, 2018. In this role, he was responsible for overseeing trade policies, negotiations and regulations, and competition and consumer protection measures.

One of the main priorities of the Mauricio Macri administration was to open up Argentina's economy to international trade.

Braun also focused on consumer protection issues. He worked to improve consumer rights and ensure that businesses adhered to fair trade practices. He played a role in the formulation and promotion of competition law reforms in Argentina.

Miguel Braun was actively involved in the negotiations surrounding the EU-Mercosur Trade Agreement. This agreement aimed to establish a free trade zone between the European Union and the Mercosur countries (Argentina, Brazil, Paraguay, and Uruguay). The agreement, which had been under negotiation for many years, was seen as a significant achievement during his time as Secretary of Commerce. It was intended to open up new markets for Argentine exports and strengthen economic ties between the two regions. However, the agreement also faced challenges and controversy. "It is true that the agreement will make us compete with the best, but the agreement gives us room to maneuver," Braun said on Twitter.

VUCE (Ventanilla Única de Comercio Exterior – Single Window for Foreign Trade) is a digital platform aimed at simplifying and streamlining foreign trade procedures in Argentina. Miguel Braun's work involved supporting the development and implementation of VUCE, which was designed to reduce bureaucracy and improve efficiency in international trade processes.

During Miguel Braun's tenure, trade negotiations with the United States included discussions related to steel and aluminum trade, as well as broader trade issues. In 2018, the U.S. president, Donald Trump, imposed tariffs of 25% on steel imports and 10% on aluminum imports. However, the Argentine government initiated negotiations to secure an exemption from these tariffs, a benefit currently enjoyed by Mexico and Canada. To pursue this exemption, Miguel Braun traveled to Washington to meet with U.S. authorities.

Some of the policies advocated by Miguel Braun and the Macri administration were met with resistance and controversy. For example, the removal of export taxes on agricultural products led to protests from some sectors of the main opposition.

On 4 October 2018, he was appointed Secretary of Economic Policy, a position he held until 9 September 2019.

Braun was part of the economic team that implemented a series of economic reforms aimed at stabilizing the Argentine economy. These reforms included efforts to reduce inflation, fiscal deficits, and government intervention in the economy. "We haven’t improved, but the foundations of the economy and society are much healthier", Braun explained to the New York Times in 2019. "Argentina is in a better place to generate a couple of decades of growth."

== Current ==
Between 2020 and 2021, he worked as an associate at the Harvard Kennedy School's Growth Lab.

He is currently a senior advisor in the Americas Programme at the Center for Strategic and International Studies (CSIS).

In February 2024, he was appointed as executive director of the Inter-American Development Bank for Argentina and Haiti.

== Books ==
- Braun, Miguel (2005). La coparticipación en su laberinto (in Spanish) (1st ed.). Buenos Aires: CIPPEC, IAE & UNLP. ISBN 9872014248. – with Atilio Elizagaray, Juan Llach and Alberto Porto.
- Braun, Miguel (2006). Macroeconomía Argentina (in Spanish) (1st ed.). Buenos Aires: Alfaomega. ISBN 9789872311308. – with Lucas Llach.
- Braun, Miguel (2006). Cada cual ¿atiende su juego? El rol del Congreso Nacional en el proceso presupuestario en la Argentina (in Spanish) (1st ed.). Buenos Aires: CIPPEC. ISBN 987201423X. – with Luciana Díaz Frers and Gerardo Uña.
- Braun, Miguel (2018). Macroeconomía Argentina (in Spanish) (2nd ed.). Buenos Aires: Sudamericana. ISBN 9789500760669. – with Lucas Llach.

== Awards and recognitions ==
- Brazil: Grand Officer of the Order of Rio Branco, Federative Republic of Brazil (2017).
- Argentina: Konex Award 2008: Merit Diploma in the category of Social Development Institutions, awarded to CIPPEC.
- Argentina United States: Amalia Lacroze de Fortabat Fellowship, David Rockefeller Center for Latin American Studies, Harvard University (2000–2001)
- United States: Economics Department Fellowship, Harvard University (1996–98)
