= Argentine currency controls (2011–2015) =

Economic situation in Argentina

Argentina installed foreign exchange controls in 2011, at the beginning of the second presidency of Cristina Fernández de Kirchner. Those controls limited the ability to buy or sell any foreign currency. The restriction was informally known in Argentina as Cepo cambiario (Spanish for 'exchange clamp'). The controls were lifted in 2015, at the beginning of the presidency of Mauricio Macri.

== History ==
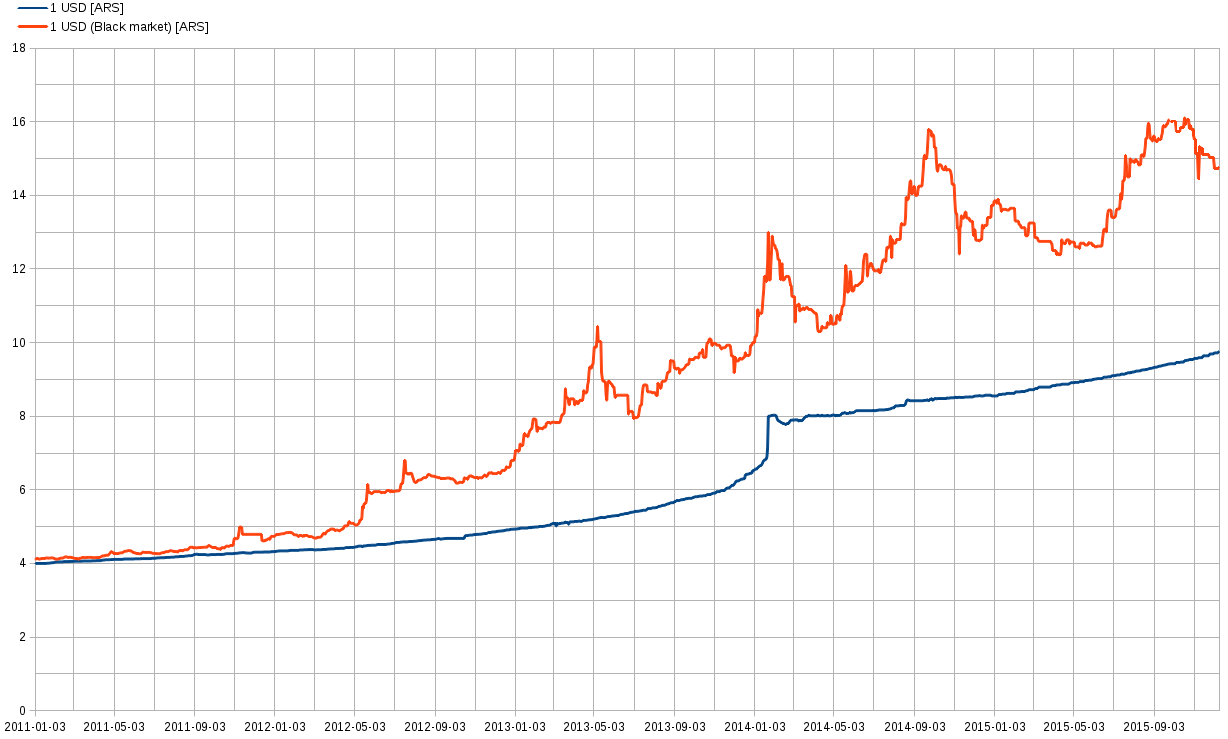
Official USD (blue) and black market USD (orange) from January 2011 to January 2016.

The first restrictions were imposed on October 31, 2011. The Tax and Customs Authority, AFIP, required that individuals and businesses who sought to buy dollars request permission, which may depend of the financial status of the buyer. However, the implementation of the rules was arbitrary. In February, restrictions were applied to all international payments in dollars, such as imports. This also affected the ability of foreign investors to return their earnings to their own countries.

The use of credit cards abroad was also restricted. As of May 2012, people could only buy dollars for 25% to 40% of their wages.

In June 2012, AFIP forbade the purchase of dollars, except for a limited number of activities. As the country had a high inflation at that point, people used to buy dollars to keep the value of their money. The use of dollars for tourism received more limits a couple of months later: people would only receive the local money of the country that they visited, and only 7 days before the trip.

By 2014, following Cristina Fernández de Kirchner use of central bank reserves to prop up the peso, the country had very low foreign reserves and a high inflation. After the 2015 elections, President Mauricio Macri hoped that by lifting the extreme currency controls it would help spark a wave of foreign investment that would help battle the dwindling foreign reserves and a double-digit inflation.

== End of restrictions ==
Mauricio Macri, who opposed the Kirchners, promised in the 2015 presidential campaign that he would cancel the restrictions immediately, as part of the reforms to promote economic growth. The restrictions were lifted on December 17, a week after he took office. Before that, the Minister of Treasury and Public Finance, Alfonso Prat-Gay sought sources of financing, such as international banks and grain exporters. It was estimated that the grain exporters had billions of dollars in stockpiled grain harvests, waiting for the changes to sell them.

== Return of the controls ==
After a new devaluation of 25% for the 2019 primary election, Mauricio Macri restricted the purchase of foreign currency by companies, and limited the purchase of dollars by individuals to a maximum of US $ 10,000 per month. After the October general election, the government limited the purchase of US dollars to 200 per month per individual.

The value of the Argentine peso continued falling after currency controls were reinstated.
