= Careful Pricing =

Careful Pricing (Spanish: Precios cuidados) is an Argentine Price controls program. It was established during the presidency of Cristina Fernández de Kirchner to control inflation levels. Although Mauricio Macri initially rejected continuing with the program, high inflation levels and the economic crisis occurred during his presidency made him renew it.

The current list includes fruits and vegetables, dairy products, fresh bread and meat, as well as some diet soft drinks. It was drafted by nutritionist Alberto Cormillot. This became controversial when it was revealed that some of the products benefited by the program were part of the Cormillot brand. Those products were removed, and Cormillot clarified that he had already sold his shares of the brand that bears his name and he's not commercially related to it any more.
