= Luis Caputo =

Argentine economist (born 1965)

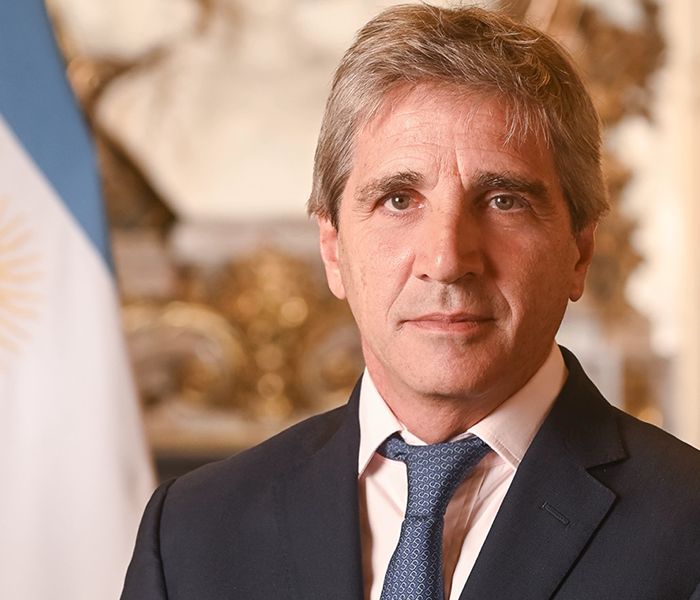
- Official portrait, 2024.

Minister of Economy
- Incumbent
- Assumed office 10 December 2023
- President: Javier Milei
- Preceded by: Sergio Massa

President of the Central Bank of Argentina In commission (Note: His appointment never passed in the Senate.)
- In office 14 June 2018 – 25 September 2018
- Preceded by: Federico Sturzenegger
- Succeeded by: Guido Sandleris

Minister of Finance
- In office 10 January 2017 – 14 June 2018
- President: Mauricio Macri
- Preceded by: Alfonso Prat-Gay

Personal details
- Born: 21 April 1965 (age 61) Buenos Aires, Argentina
- Party: LLA (since 2024)
- Other political affiliations: PRO (2015–2024); JxC (2015–2024)
- Spouse: Ximena Ruiz
- Children: 6
- Education: University of Buenos Aires (BA)
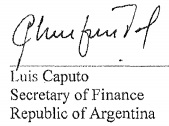
- Signature

Luis Andrés "Toto" Caputo (Spanish pronunciation: [ˈlwis anˈdɾes kaˈputo]; born 21 April 1965) is an Argentine economist who is the current Minister of Economy under Javier Milei's presidency, having assumed office on 10 December 2023. He previously served as Minister of Public Finances from 2017 to 2018 and President of the Central Bank of Argentina in 2018.

== Early life and education ==
Caputo completed his primary and secondary studies at the catholic and bilingual La Salle College. He graduated with a degree in Economics from the University of Buenos Aires.

His cousin, Nicolás Caputo, is a construction industry entrepreneur close to Mauricio Macri.

== Academics ==
Caputo was a professor of economics and finance in the postgraduate course of the Pontifical Catholic University of Argentina.

== Finances ==
Caputo served as Chief of Trading for Latin America at JP Morgan between 1994 and 1998, and he held the same position for Eastern Europe and Latin America at Deutsche Bank between 1998 and 2003. From then until 2008, he was chairman of the Argentine branch of Deutsche Bank.

== Secretary and Minister of Finances ==
In December 2015, Caputo assumed the position of Secretary of Finances of the Macri's administration.

During his tenure he played a key role together with Alfonso Prat Gay in the negotiation with the hedge funds, where the country agreed to pay 9.352 million US dollars and Argentina returned to international capital markets and guaranteed external financing in a difficult context as a result of the default inherited from Cristina Fernández de Kirchner.

On 26 December 2016, after the dismissal of Alfonso Prat-Gay by President Macri, the Ministry of Treasury and Public Finance was split in two, with Caputo being appointed Minister of Finance in January 2017.

He continued to take on the task of ensuring the arrival of the necessary funds to face the fiscal deficit. His deep knowledge of international finance and direct contact with interlocutors on Wall Street are highlighted.

In 2017, a government branch of the Fiscal Ministry opened a judicial case accusing Caputo of embezzling money from a Social Security fund by paying fees of at least 540,000 AR$ to a company he had owned and directed until 2015, in lieu of unnecessary services.

On 5 November 2017, the Paradise Papers, a set of confidential electronic documents relating to offshore investment, revealed that Caputo had managed at least two offshore wealth funds.

== President of Central Bank ==
On 14 June 2018, Caputo became President of the Central Bank of Argentina (BCRA). His main challenge was to contain inflation, a result that the Sturzenegger administration did not achieve in 2018.

Caputo was in the midst of the 2018 Argentine monetary crisis. He increased the interest rate from 20% and the Argentine peso was devalued by 40% in three months.

He oversaw a dramatic reduction in BRCA debt in the form of Letras del Banco Central (LEBAC) bills, a move considered to be an important achievement.

Meanwhile, the BCRA's reserves in June were $45 billion and, upon announcing its resignation, it reached $49 billion (considering here the IMF's money inflow).

He resigned on 25 September 2018 "for personal reasons", during a negotiation with the International Monetary Fund and internal policies, and was replaced by the Secretary of Economic Policy of the Ministry of Treasury, Guido Sandleris.

Argentine stocks and bonds fell after his departure from the Central Bank.

== Other activities ==
- Central American Bank for Economic Integration (CABEI), Ex-Officio Member of the Board of Governors
- Multilateral Investment Guarantee Agency (MIGA), World Bank Group, Ex-Officio Member of the Board of Governors

== Notes ==
Political offices
Preceded by Sergio Massa	Minister of Economy; 2023–present	Incumbent
