= Evasion (ethics) =

Deceit in which one states a truth that is irrelevant or implies a falsehood

In ethics, evasion is an act of deception where a true statement is irrelevant or leads to a false conclusion. For instance, a man knows that a woman is in a room in the building because he heard her, but in answer to a question as to whether she is present, says "I have not seen her", thereby avoiding both lying and making a revelation.

Evasion is described as a way to fulfil an obligation to tell the truth while keeping secrets from those not entitled to know the truth. Evasions are closely related to equivocations and mental reservations; indeed, some statements fall under both descriptions.

== Evasion techniques ==
Peter Bull identified the following evasion techniques for answering questions:

1. Ignoring the question
2. Acknowledging the question without answering it
3. Questioning the question by:
  - requesting clarification
  - reflecting the question back to the questioner, for example saying "you tell me"
4. Attacking the question by saying:
  - "the question fails to address the important issue"
  - "the question is hypothetical or speculative"
  - "the question is based on a false premise"
  - "the question is factually inaccurate"
  - "the question includes a misquotation"
  - "the question includes a quotation taken out of context"
  - "the question is objectionable"
  - "the question is based on a false alternative"
5. Attacking the questioner
6. Declining to answer by:
  - refusing on grounds of inability
  - being unwilling to answer
  - saying "I can't speak for someone else"
  - deferring answer, saying "it is not possible to answer the question for the time being"
  - pleading ignorance
  - placing the responsibility to answer on someone else

=== Question dodging ===
Question dodging is a rhetorical technique involving the intentional avoidance of answering a question. This may occur when the person questioned either does not know the answer and wants to avoid embarrassment, or when the person is being interrogated or questioned in debate, and wants to avoid giving a direct response.

A famous example of question dodging in a UK context occurred in 1997 when Home Secretary Michael Howard was questioned by Jeremy Paxman on the BBC's Newsnight. While discussing a meeting Howard had with the head of the Prison Service, Derek Lewis, about the possible dismissal of the head of Parkhurst Prison; Paxman asked Howard "did you threaten to overrule him?". Howard dodged the question by saying that he did not overrule him. Paxman repeatedly asked the question "did you threaten to overrule him?" a total of 12 times during the interview with Howard evading each time.

Overt question dodging can sometimes be employed humorously, in order to sidestep giving a public answer in a political discussion: when a reporter asked Mayor Richard J. Daley why Hubert Humphrey had lost the state of Illinois in the 1968 presidential election, Daley replied "He lost it because he didn't get enough votes." Similarly when Larry King asked Putin what happened with Kursk submarine, Putin answered: 'She sank'. Often the aim of dodging a question is to make it seem as though the question was fulfilled, leaving the person who asked the question feeling satisfied with the answer, unaware that the question was not properly answered. A false accusation of question dodging can sometimes be made as a disingenuous tactic in debate, in the informal fallacy of the loaded question. A common way out of this argument is not to answer the question (e.g. with a simple 'yes' or 'no'), but to challenge the assumption behind the question. This can lead the person questioned to be accused of "dodging the question".

== See also ==
- Begging the question
- Mental reservation
- Non-apology apology
- Non-denial denial
