= Guido Sandleris =

Argentine economist

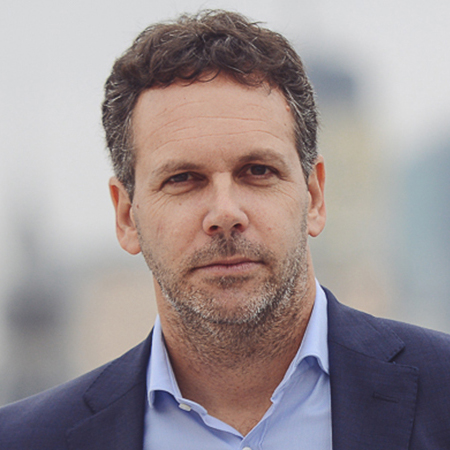

President of the Central Bank of Argentina
- In office 25 September 2018 – 9 December 2019
- President: Mauricio Macri
- Preceded by: Luis Caputo
- Succeeded by: Miguel Ángel Pesce

Secretary of Economic Policy
- In office 15 June 2018 – 25 September 2018
- President: Mauricio Macri
- Preceded by: Sebastián Galiani
- Succeeded by: Miguel Braun

Personal details
- Born: 11 May 1971 (age 55)
- Party: Independent
- Other political affiliations: Cambiemos (2015–present)
- Education: University of Buenos Aires; Columbia University; London School of Economics
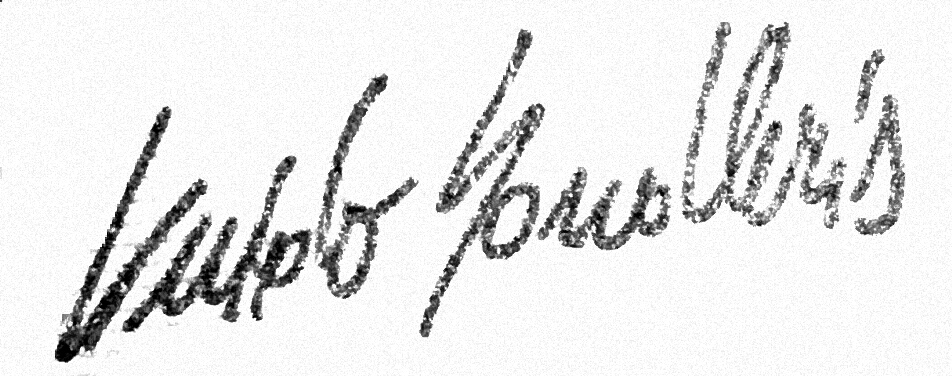
- Signature

Guido Martín Sandleris (born 11 May 1971) is an Argentine economist who was President of the Central Bank of Argentina.

== Early life and education ==
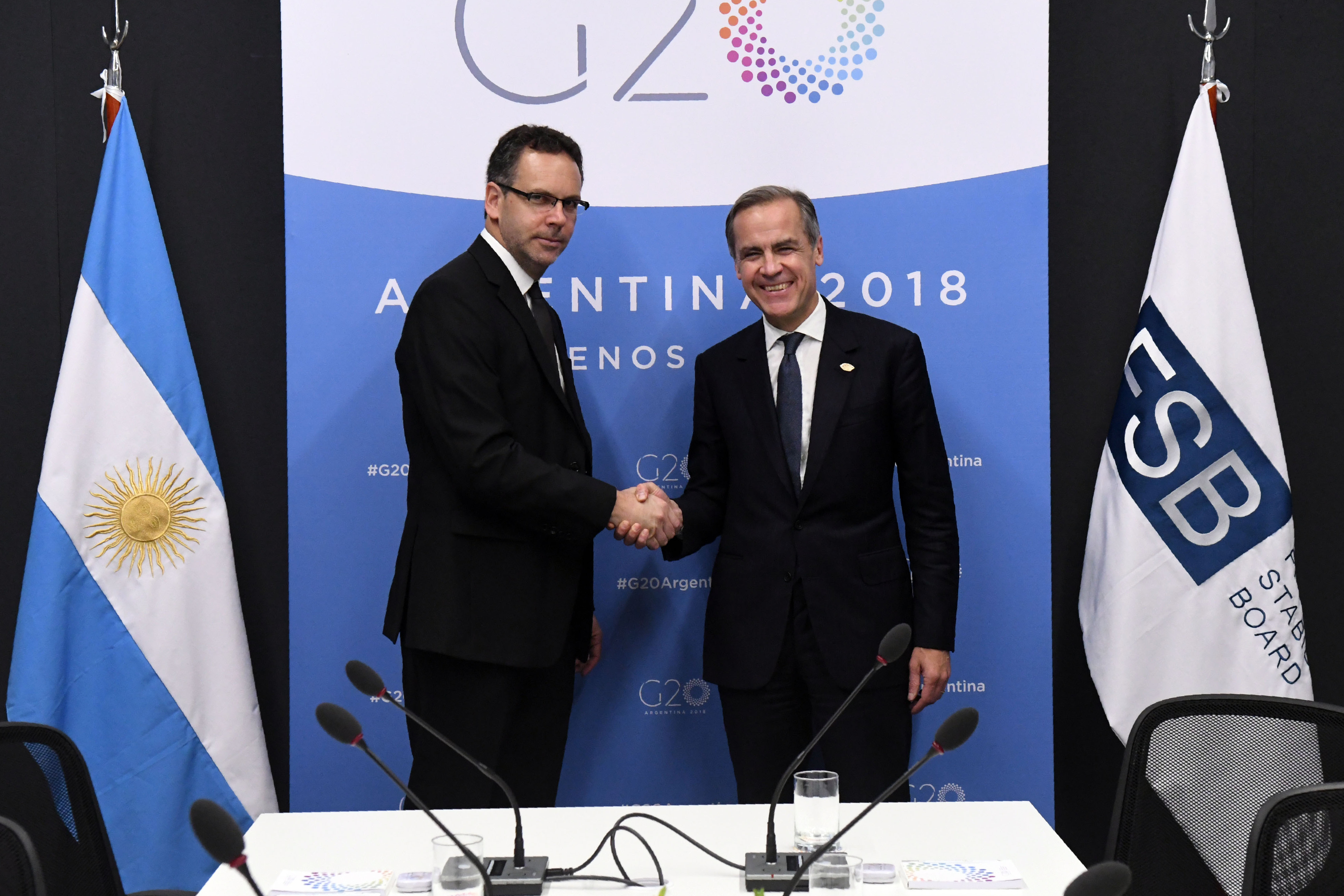
Sandleris with the Governor of the Bank of England, Mark Carney in Buenos Aires, November 2018.

Sandleris was born to a middle-class Jewish family in Buenos Aires, Argentina. His grandfather had immigrated from Lithuania. He graduated from the University of Buenos Aires, received a masters from the London School of Economics, and holds a doctorate from Columbia University. He taught Economics at Johns Hopkins University and Torcuato di Tella University.

== Private sector ==
In the private sector, he carried out consulting and research work for the World Bank, the Inter-American Development Bank, the General Treasury Office and in investment banks and Latin American governments in general.

== Public sector ==
He was an advisor to the Minister of Economy José Luis Machinea (1999-2001).

Before taking charge of the Central Bank of Argentina in September 2018, he served as Secretary of Economic Policy of the Ministry of Treasury since 2016.

== Central Bank of Argentina ==
He assumed the presidency of the Central Bank of Argentina after the resignation of Luis Caputo at an extremely difficult time.

As of October 2018, it implemented a strict monetary scheme that included a contraction plan for the monetary base based on high interest rates (from 60% to 70%).

He launched the Liquidity Letters, a tool from the Central Bank to limit the amount of money circulating in order to reduce inflation.

In his administration, he applied exchange bands where the dollar could float freely. This was backed by the International Monetary Fund and worked perfectly until the outcome of the 2019 primary elections, when Argentine peso was devaluated 25%.

After this new devaluation, he restricted the purchase of foreign currency by companies, and limited the purchase of dollars by individuals to a maximum of US $10,000 per month. After the october general election, restrictions restricted the purchase of dollars to 200 per month.

He presented his resignation from the Central Bank with an inflation rate of 53% a few days before Alberto Fernández's arrival.

== Other activities ==
- Financial Stability Board (FSB), Ex-Officio Member of Standing Committee on Assessment of Vulnerabilities (since 2018)
- Central American Bank for Economic Integration (CABEI), Ex-Officio Alternate Member of the Board of Governors (since 2018)
- Inter-American Investment Corporation (IIC), Ex-Officio AlternateMember of the Board of Governors (since 2018)
- International Monetary Fund (IMF), Ex-Officio Alternate Member of the Board of Governors (since 2018)
- World Bank, Ex-Officio Alternate Member of the Board of Governors (since 2018)
- Multilateral Investment Guarantee Agency (MIGA), World Bank Group, Ex-Officio Alternate Member of the Board of Governors (since 2018)
