= 2018–present Argentine monetary crisis =

Economic crisis in Argentina

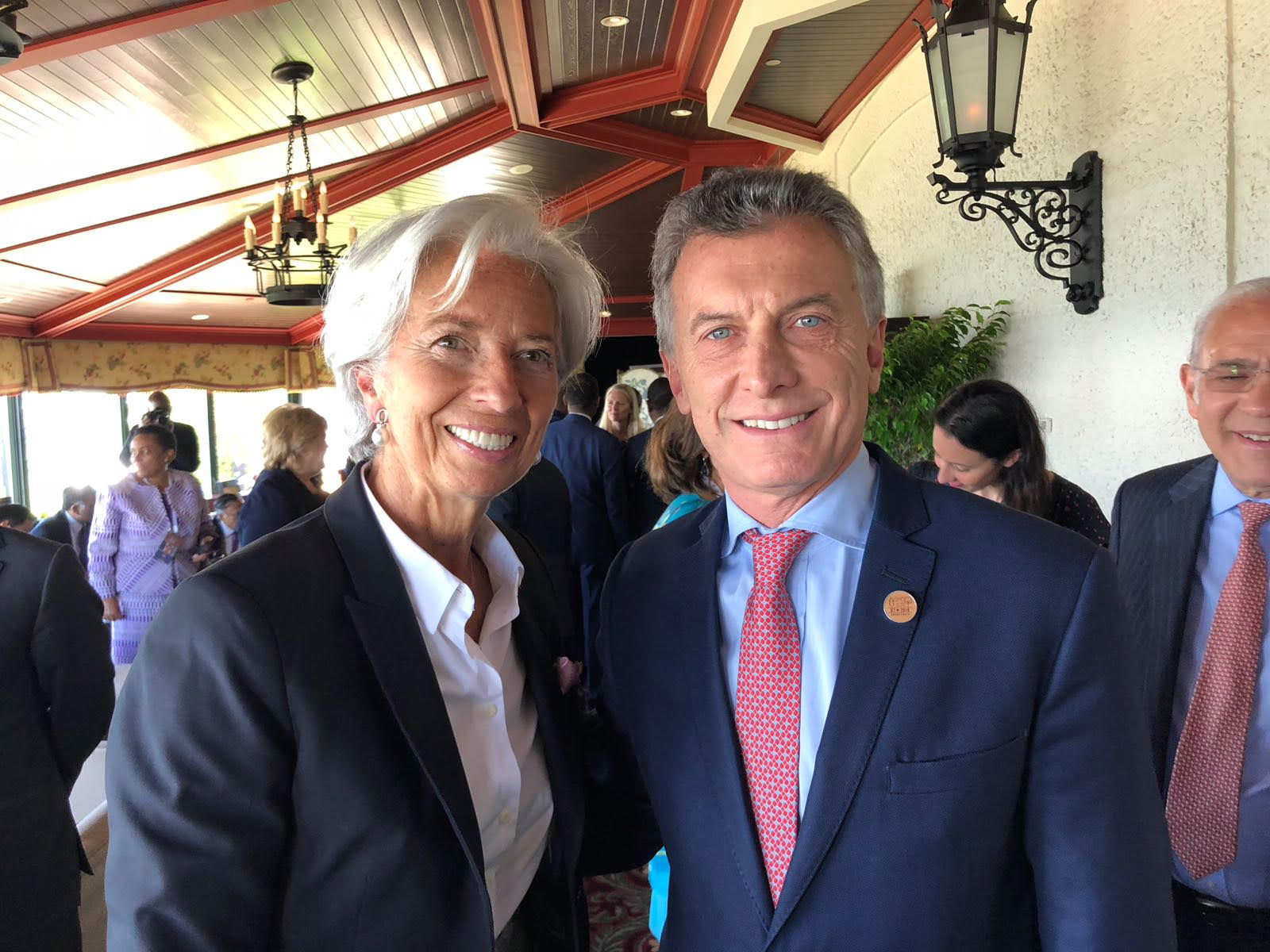
President Mauricio Macri and managing director of the IMF Christine Lagarde, at the 2018 G7 Summit in Canada

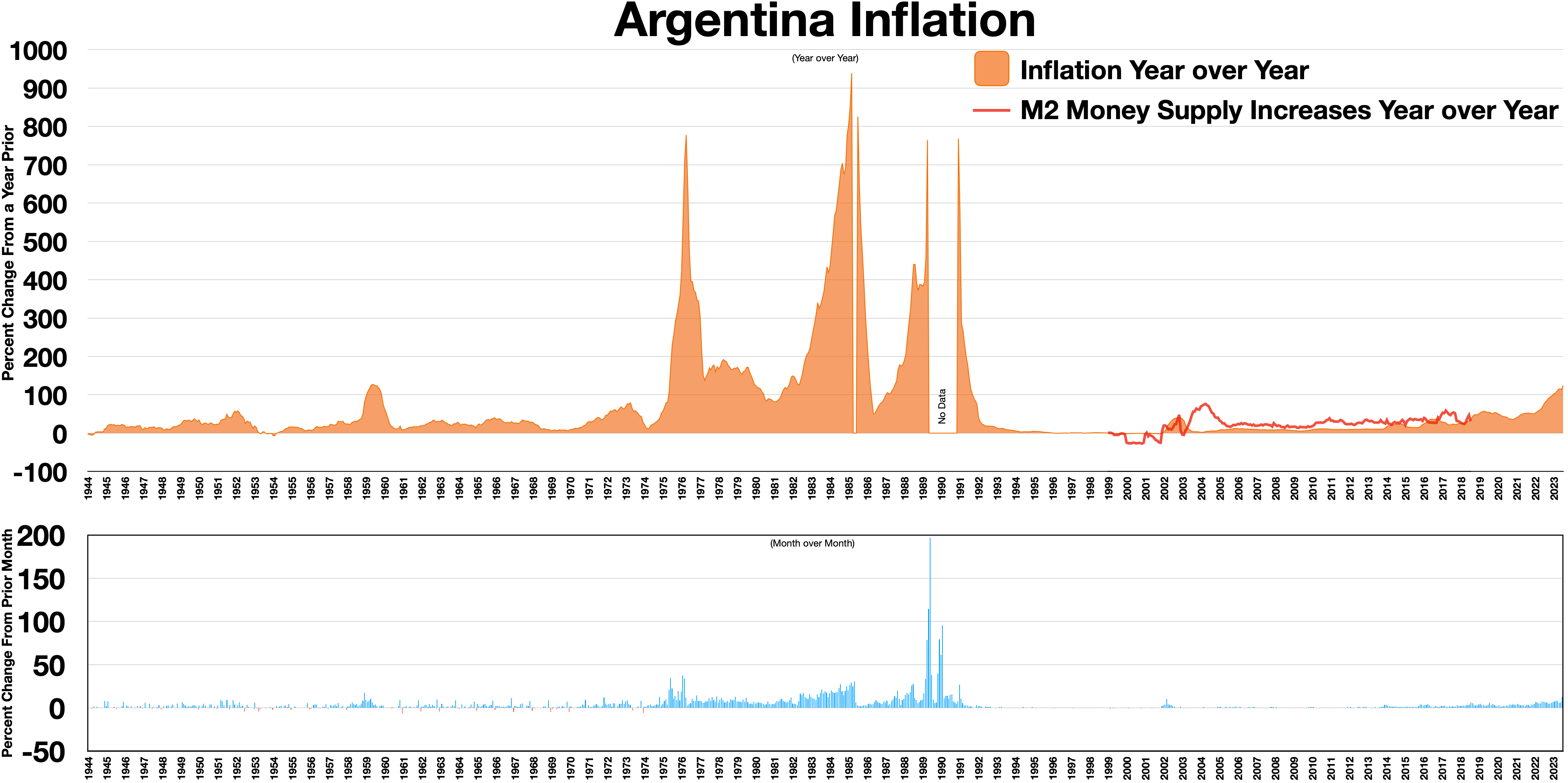
Argentina inflation 1944–2023 Year-over-year inflation M2 money supply increases year over year Month-over-month inflation

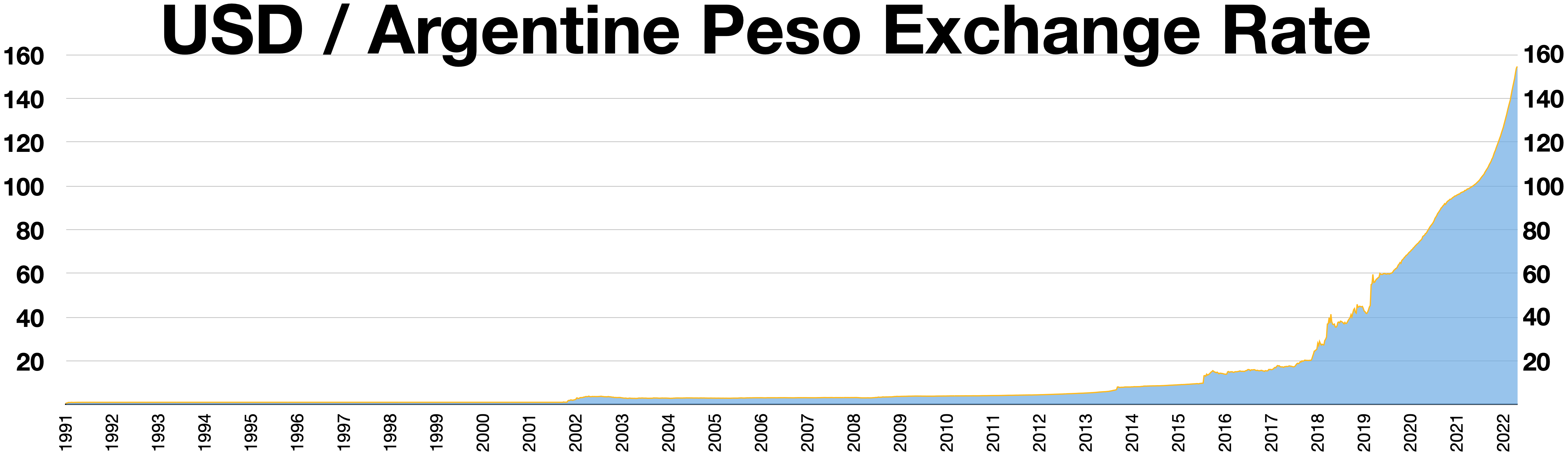
USD to Argentine peso exchange rate

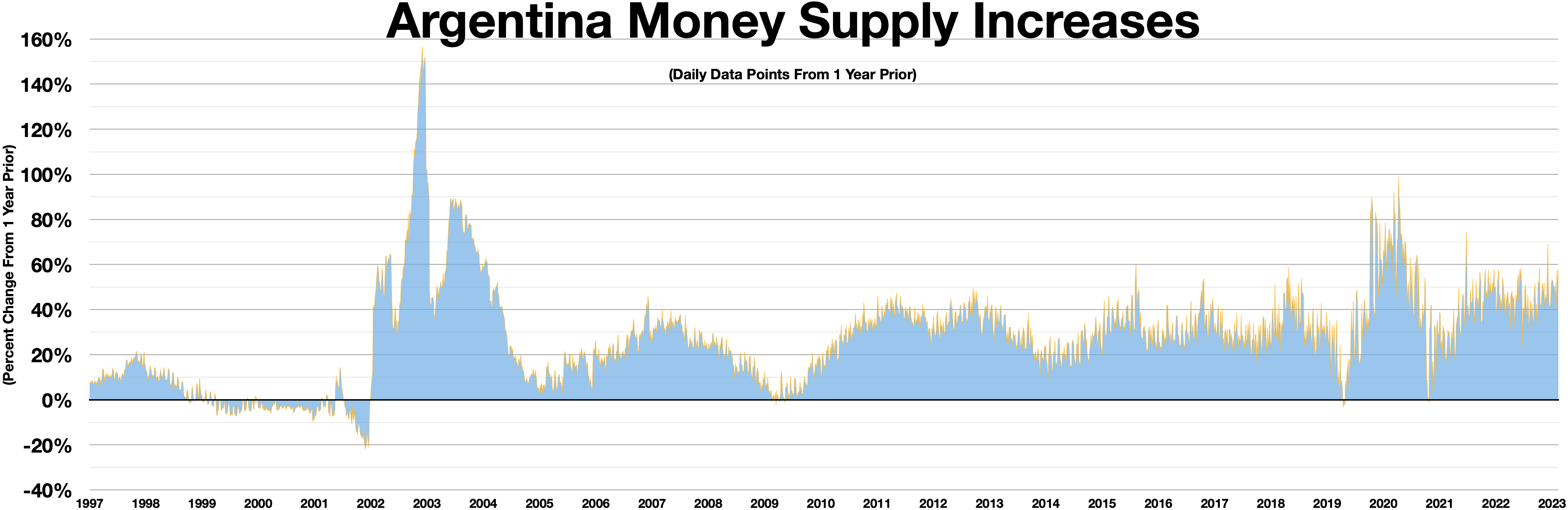
Argentina Money Supply Increases

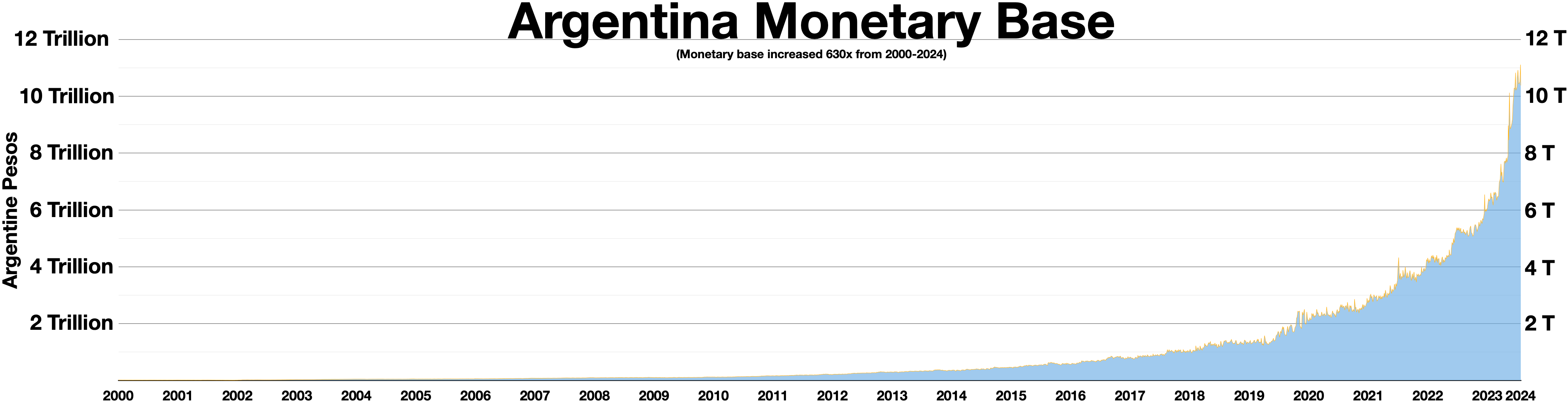
Argentina monetary base from 2000 to 2024. The monetary base increased 630× in 24 years.

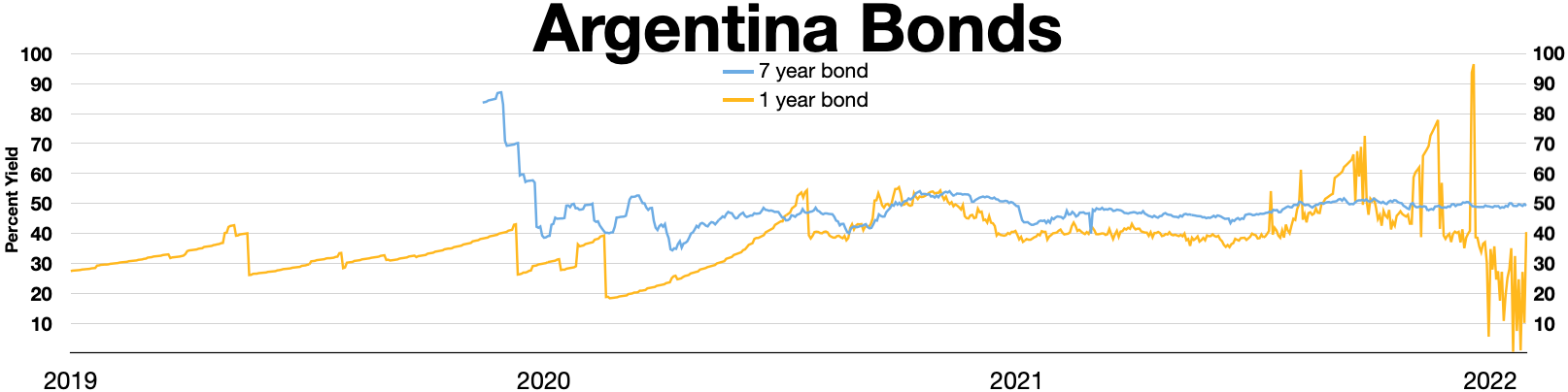
Argentina bonds 7 year bond 1 year bond

The 2018–present Argentine monetary crisis is an ongoing severe devaluation of the Argentine peso, caused by high inflation and steep fall in the perceived value of the currency at the local level as it continually lost purchasing power, along with other domestic and international factors. As a result, the presidency of Mauricio Macri requested a loan from the International Monetary Fund.

== Background ==
The presidency of Cristina Fernández de Kirchner ended in 2015, and the new president Mauricio Macri engaged in changing many aspects of the economy of Argentina left behind by Kirchner. The Central Bank of Argentina's foreign-currency reserves were depleted; the annual inflation rate was over 30 percent, and the country had the highest tax rates in its history. The government budget balance had an 8% deficit, and the government faced international legal battles over its sovereign default after the Kirchner administration refused to continue payments of the country's massive foreign debt. Tight currency controls had been in place since 2011, creating a parallel shadow market for foreign exchange currency. A global drop in commodity prices sharply reduced expected trade revenue, further straining the country's economy.

One of president Macri's first economic policies was the removal of currency controls, allowing Argentines to freely buy and sell foreign currencies in the market. Another early policy was the removal of export quotas and tariffs on corn and wheat. Import tariffs on soybeans, Argentina's most lucrative export, were reduced from 35 to 30 percent.

Macri also proclaimed the end of the national default. Though these measures were applauded by experts and foreign trade-organisations, they failed to produce the economic boom that the Macri administration had promised during the electoral campaign. Inflation remained high and economic growth weak. However, the small economic growth was enough to provide Macri with a victory at the 2017 midterm elections, surpassing Kirchner in the Buenos Aires province by a wide margin.

== Ongoing crisis ==
Since the late 2010s, inflation has been a constant problem for the economy of Argentina, with an annual rate of 25% in 2017, second only to Venezuela in South America and the highest in the G20. On 28 December, the Central Bank of Argentina together with the Treasury announced a change of the inflation target. The Central Bank attempted to reduce it to 15%, by adjusting its interest rates but these efforts only managed to stop further inflation rather than reduce it. An intense drought, ranking among the world's worst natural disasters in 2018, reduced the production of soy and dried up tax revenue.

Later in 2018, the Federal Reserve of the United States increased interest rates from 0.25% to 1.75% and then 2%. This caused investors to return to the United States, leaving emerging markets. The effect, a rise in the price of the United States dollar, was modest in most countries, but it was felt particularly strongly in Argentina, Brazil and Turkey. Despite the high-interest rates and IMF support, investors feared that the country might fall into a sovereign default once again, especially if another administration were to be voted in during the next election cycle, and started pulling out investments. All those factors led to a dramatic increase in the price of the US dollar in Argentina. The Central Bank increased the interest rate again, to 60%, but could not keep up.

Macri announced on 8 May 2018 that Argentina would seek a loan from the International Monetary Fund (IMF). The initial loan was $50 billion, and the country pledged to reduce inflation and public spending. Federico Sturzenegger, the president of the Central Bank of Argentina, resigned a week later, alongside much of its senior staff. Macri replaced him with Luis Caputo, and merged the ministries of treasury and finances into a single ministry, led by Nicolás Dujovne. The Turkish currency and debt crisis caused yet another increase on the price of the dollar. The tariffs on soy exports were restored, as a result of the crisis. Caputo resigned for personal reasons, and Guido Sandleris was appointed as president of the Central Bank. The IMF expanded the loan with an extra 7 billion U.S. dollars, the largest loan in IMF history. In exchange, the Central Bank would operate on the price of the dollar only when it surpassed certain requirements. The national budget for 2019 reduced the deficit, which was 2.6 percent of GDP in 2018, to zero, and estimated that inflation would decrease from 44% to 23%. This budget was approved by the Congress, despite demonstrations and Kirchnerist rejection.

In the 2019 presidential election, Néstor Kirchner's former Chief of the Cabinet of Ministers Alberto Fernández was elected president. The new peronist administration immediately refused to take the remaining $11 billion of the loan, arguing that it was no longer obliged to adhere to the IMF conditions. The value of the peso continued to plummet as foreign investors pulled out and the COVID-19 pandemic hit the country in early 2020. Fernández soon brought back some of Cristina Kirchner's more criticized economic policies, often expanding on them. This included extremely tight control on all currency exchange operations, which involved setting a maximum exchange of $200 US dollars per month for all citizens, imposing a new 35% tax on all foreign currency exchange operations, and artificially freezing the official exchange rate. By September 2020. the government had severely restricted most exchange operations, especially for those citizens without stable incomes. These measures caused the underground foreign exchange market to come back to life, despite efforts made by the previous Macri's administration to stamp it out, further weakening Argentina's control over its economy. In 2022, Argentina's inflation rate reached 100%, and in November 2023 reached 143%, with 55% of children in Argentina living below the poverty line and more than 18 million citizens not being able to afford basic goods as of 2023. When Javier Milei was elected to the office of president in December 2023, his main election promise was to initiate a libertarian recovery economic plan to mitigate the economic crisis and restore the Argentinean economy to normalcy. In January 2024, after a series of economic shock measures were introduced, inflation reached a 32-year high at 211%. President Milei has also announced sweeping cuts in government including attempting to eliminate a large portion of the government ministries.

== 2024–present ==
By January 2025, inflation had declined its lowest in four years. Annual inflation for 2024 was 117.8%. In December 2024, monthly inflation was just 2.7%. By December 2025, the slow monthly trend of increasing inflation had continued, but ended with the lowest December inflation rate since 2017 at a 31.5% annual rate. Despite this, monthly prices rose 2.8%, driven mainly by transport, housing, and fuel.

== See also ==
- 1998–2002 Argentine great depression
- Historical exchange rates of Argentine currency
- Latin American debt crisis
- 2021–2023 inflation
- Turkish economic crisis (2018–current)
