= False conclusion =

A false conclusion is a result of reasoning that is false. It may refer to:

- Error
- False (logic)
- Any kind of fallacy
- Jumping to conclusions

== See also ==
- Reductio ad absurdum
