= Central American Bank for Economic Integration =

International multilateral development financial institution

- Formation: 1960; 66 years ago
- Type: Multilateral Development Bank
- Legal status: Treaty
- Headquarters: Tegucigalpa, Honduras
- Members: 15 countries
- Key people: Gisela Sánchez (Executive President)
- Website: www.bcie.org/en/

The Central American Bank for Economic Integration - CABEI (BCIE in Spanish) was founded in 1960. It is an international multilateral development financial institution. Its resources are invested in projects that foster development to reduce poverty and inequality; strengthen regional integration and the competitive insertion of its member countries in the global economy; providing special attention to environmental sustainability. Its headquarters are in Tegucigalpa (Honduras) and has regional offices in Guatemala, Honduras, El Salvador, Nicaragua, Costa Rica and Panama.

== Mission ==
CABEI is a multilateral development bank whose mission is to promote the economic integration and the balanced economic and social development of the Central American region, which includes the founding countries and the non-founding regional countries, attending and aligning itself with the interests of all of its member countries.

== Vision ==
CABEI's vision consists of being the strategic ally of its member countries in the provision of financial solutions that contribute to the creation of employment and improvement of the well-being and quality of life of its citizens.

== Members ==
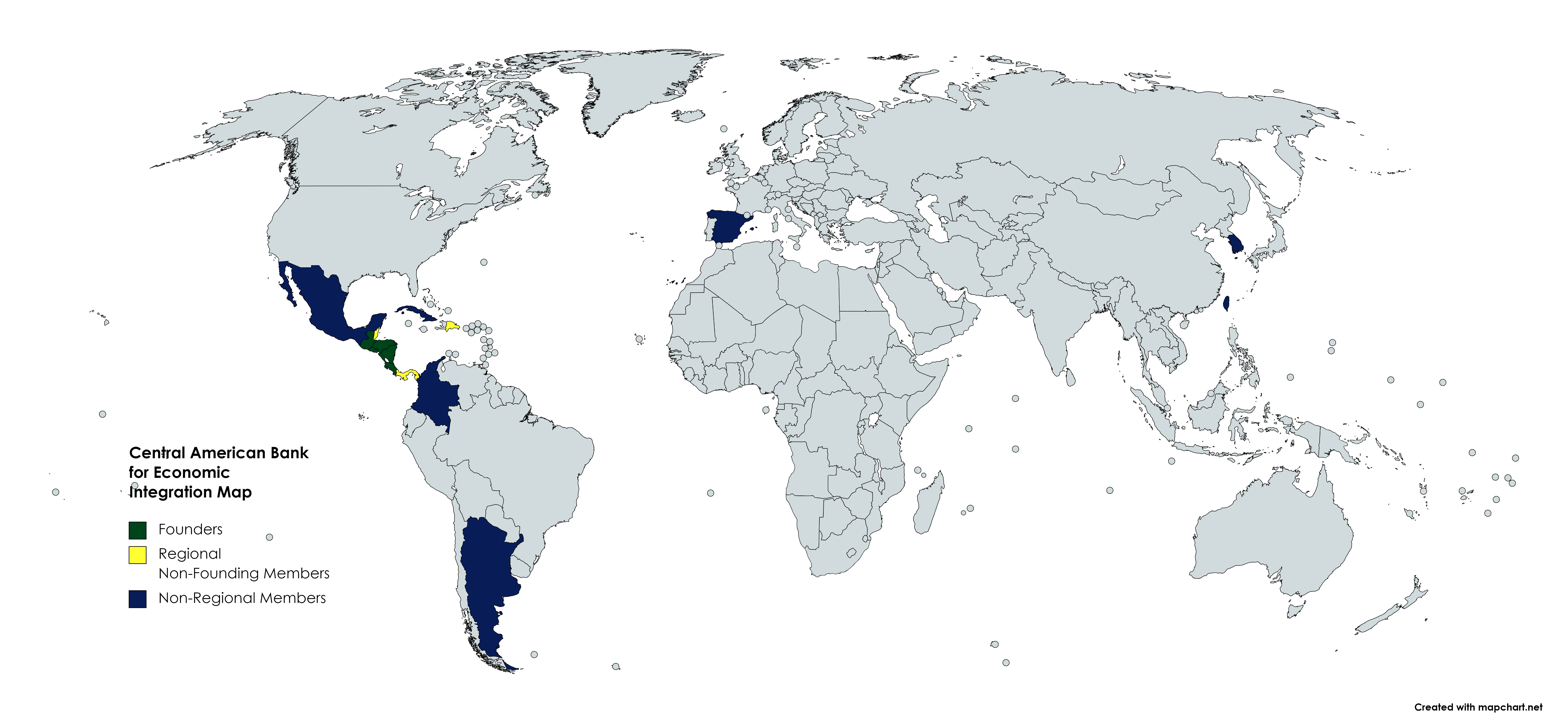
CABEI members

- Founding countries: Guatemala, Honduras, El Salvador, Nicaragua and Costa Rica. These countries signed the founding covenant which establishes the CABEI, in the decision frame adopted by their governments to promote regional economic integration.
- Non-founding regional countries: Panama and Dominican Republic, which take part in the Central American Integration System (SICA in its Spanish initials) and are represented before CABEI's Board of Directors and Governors' Assembly.
- Non-regional countries: Mexico, Cuba, Taiwan, Argentina, Colombia, Spain, and South Korea. They have deemed important to join CABEI with the aim of having a permanent regional presence, thus enlarging their international projection through supporting founding countries' development. They also have named representatives before CABEI's Board of Directors and Governors' Assembly.
- Beneficiary countries: Belize. It has joined the CABEI to receive loans and guarantees, same as regional countries, but, unlike them, Belize has not bought shares of the institution.

Apart from regional countries, Argentina and Colombia enjoy the capacity of receiving CABEI's loans and guarantees.

== Functions ==
CABEI is the development bank for Central America, its strategic partner and the main purveyor of resources: by late 2009, it had approved $14,603.3 million since its inception for the development of the region.

As a regional financing institution, CABEI supports both public and private sectors and specializes in raising and channeling external money to promote investment in its action areas, which are:

- Energy and production infrastructure
- Agriculture and rural development
- Human development and social infrastructure
- Industry, urban development and services for competitiveness
- Financial trading and development finance

== Structure ==
CABEI's maximum authority is the Governors' Assembly, integrated by Ministers of Economy and central bank Governors of member countries.

Besides, CABEI's Founding Covenant includes other authorities: Directory, as the organ responsible for the bank's direction; President, elected by the Governors' Assembly; Vice president, elected by the Directory; and other officials deemed necessary for the institution's functioning.

== See also ==
- CAF – Development Bank of Latin America and the Caribbean
- Central American Integration System
- Inter-American Development Bank
