= Juan Hospital =

Argentine footballer

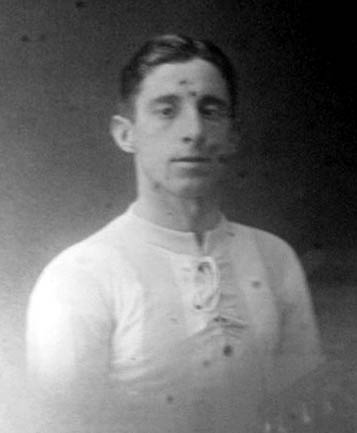

Personal information
- Date of birth: 1893
- Date of death: 21 August 1956 (aged 62–63)

Senior career*
| Years | Team | Apps | (Gls) |
- Independiente
| 1912–1922 | Racing Club | | |

International career
| 1912–1916 | Argentina | 7 | (1) |
Medal record
Men's football
Representing Argentina
South American Championship
| Runner-up | 1916 Argentina |
- * Club domestic league appearances and goals

Juan Hospital (1893 – 21 August 1956) was an Argentine footballer who played as inside left. Hospital spent most his entire career at Racing Club, where he won 19 titles during the most successful era of the club.

Nicknamed Pichín, Hospital started playing in Independiente, then moving to Racing in 1912. Notable for his skills to dribble, he would consolidate as one of the most notable forwards during the golden age of the club, forming a memorable attacking line along with legends such as Alberto Ohaco, Alberto Marcovecchio, and Natalio Perinetti, which became one of the most prolific forward lines of all time of the club. Moreover, Hospital was one of the footballers who contributed to Racing earning the nickname Academia ("academy") during those years.

He played in seven matches for the Argentina national football team from 1912 to 1916. He was also part of Argentina's squad for the 1916 South American Championship.

Hospital died on August 21, 1956, at the age of 63.

== Honours ==
Racing Club

- Primera División (8): 1913, 1914, 1915, 1916, 1917, 1918, 1919, 1921
- Copa Honor MCBA (3): 1913, 1915, 1917
- Copa Ibarguren (5): 1913, 1914, 1916, 1917, 1918
- Copa de Honor Cousenier (1): 1913
- Copa Aldao (2): 1917, 1918
