= Armando Reyes =

Argentine footballer

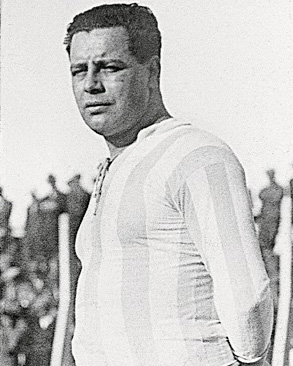

Personal information
- Date of birth: April 28, 1893
- Place of birth: Avellaneda
- Date of death: 7 September 1954
- Position: Right back

Senior career*
Years	Team	Apps	(Gls)
1911–1929	Racing Club		

International career
1916–1919	Argentina	22	(0)

Managerial career
- Racing Club
Medal record
Men's football
Representing Argentina
South American Championship
Runner-up	1916 Argentina
Runner-up	1917 Uruguay
- * Club domestic league appearances and goals

Armando Reyes (28 October 1893 – 7 September 1954) was an Argentine footballer and manager who spent his entire career in Racing Club, where he stayed from 1911 to 1929. His position on the field was left back.

He was one of the most important Argentinian defenders of the team and won 20 titles with the club.

== Club career ==
Nicknamed El Negro, Reyes was born in Avellaneda on October 28, 1893. He started his career in the youth system of Club Racing in 1910, where he played alongside future idols of the club, such as Carlos Muttoni, Francisco Olazar, and Ricardo Pepe. Reyes left the senior squad in 1929, joining the veterans team where he stayed until 1929.

Reyes was part of one of Racing Club's best periods, which included seven consecutive league titles, earning the nickname Academia ("academy").

Despite having played his entire career for Racing Club, Reyes played a friendly match for Gath & Chaves on 8 October 1918.

When he retired from football, Reyes became manager of Racing Club in the early 1930s.

== International career ==
Internationally, Reyes played a total of 22 matches for the Argentina national football team, being also part of Argentina's squad for the 1916, 1917, and 1919 South American Championship.

== Honours ==
Racing

- Primera División (8): 1913, 1914, 1915, 1916, 1917, 1918, 1919, 1921
- Copa Honor MCBA (4): 1912, 1913, 1915, 1917
- Copa Ibarguren (5): 1913, 1914, 1916, 1917, 1918
- Copa de Honor Cousenier (1): 1913
- Copa Aldao (2): 1917, 1918
