= Nicolás Vivaldo =

Argentine footballer

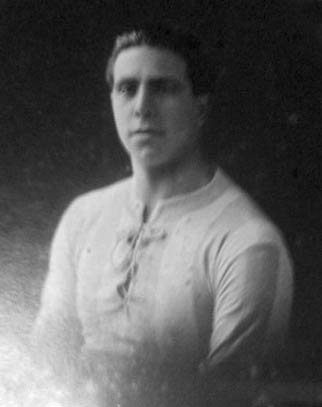

Personal information
- Date of birth: 1896
- Date of death: 1990 (aged 93–94)
- Position: Forward

Senior career*
Years	Team	Apps	(Gls)
1913–1918	Racing		
1919–1927	Porteño	15+	(2+)
1928	Argentinos Juniors	21	(3)

International career
1917–1925	Argentina	10	(2)
- * Club domestic league appearances and goals

Nicolás Vivaldo (1896 – 1990) was an Argentine footballer, who played for Racing, Porteño, and Argentinos Juniors between 1913 and 1925. He was part of the "golden age" of Racing Club that earned the club the nickname Academy. Vivaldo won 17 titles with Racing.

Internationally, he played in ten matches for the Argentina national football team from 1917 to 1925. He was also part of Argentina's squad for the 1917 South American Championship.

== Titles ==
Racing

- Primera División (8): 1913, 1914, 1915, 1916, 1917, 1918
- Copa Honor MCBA (3): 1913, 1915, 1917
- Copa Ibarguren (5): 1913, 1914, 1916, 1917, 1918
- Copa de Honor Cousenier (1): 1913
- Copa Aldao (2): 1917, 1918
