= Marcos Croce =

Argentine footballer (1894–1978)

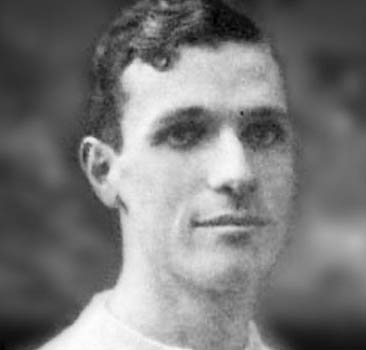

Personal information
- Full name: Marcos Francisco Croce
- Date of birth: 6 March 1894
- Date of death: 10 July 1978 (aged 84)
- Position: Goalkeeper

Senior career*
Years	Team	Apps	(Gls)
1910–?	Alumni		
- Estudiantes (BA)
1917–1925	Racing Club		
1928–1931	Sp. Palermo		

International career
1916–1919	Argentina	7	(0)
- * Club domestic league appearances and goals

Marcos Francisco Croce (6 March 1894 – 10 July 1978) was an Argentine footballer who played as a goalkeeper. Croce spent most of his career at Racing Club, but he also played in Alumni, Estudiantes BA, and Sportivo Palermo.

Croce is regarded not only as the first great goalkeeper for Racing Club but one of the best in the history of the club.

== Biography ==
Croce debuted in Alumni at the age of 16 years, then moving to C.A. Estudiantes. In 1917, he was transferred to a Racing Club, where he had a long tenure, also winning 10 titles with the club between 1917 and 1925. Besides, Croce was also one of the first Argentine goalkeepers to kick penalties, scoring several goals.

Between 1920 and 1921, Croce set a record of 1,077 minutes, keeping his goal unbeaten (for more than 11 consecutive matches). This record still remains for Argentine Primera División matches. Croce broke the record set by another Racing goalkeeper, Syla Arduino, who had remained 891 minutes unbeaten.

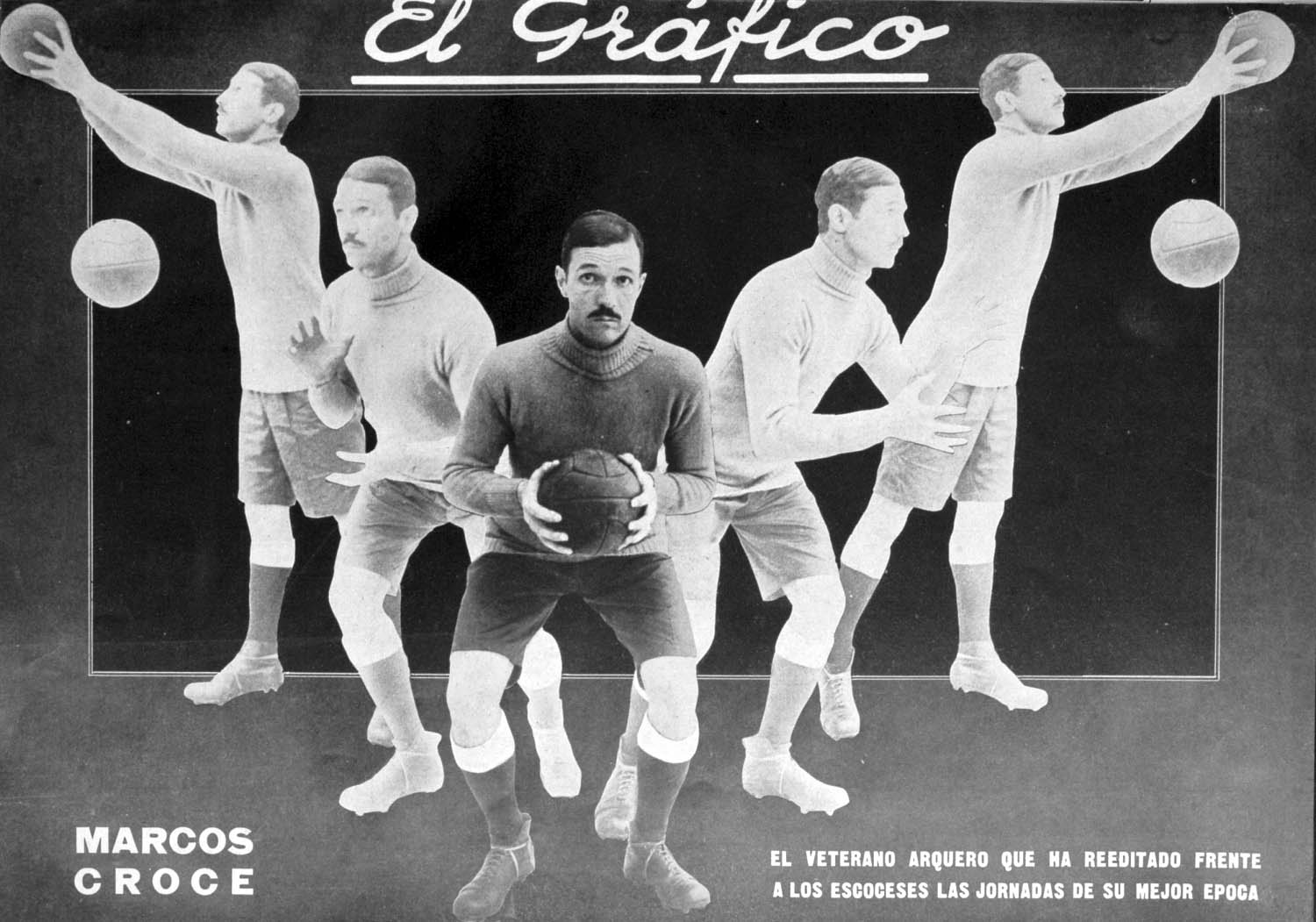
A 34 years old Croce on the cover of El Gráfico, May 1928

In 1928, Croce (who was playing for Sportivo Palermo) was part of the Capital Federal Combined that played two friendly matches against Scottish side Motherwell F.C. in Buenos Aires. Those exhibition games were scheduled as part of Motherwell's tour of South America. Croce's good performances gained him recognition by the press, even appearing on the cover of sports magazine El Gráfico.

Croce retired from football in 1931, playing for Sportivo Palermo. He died on 10 July 1978 at 84 years old.

Internationally, Croce played seven matches for the Argentina national football team. He was also part of Argentina's squad for the 1917 South American Championship, sharing duties with River Plate goalkeeper Carlos Isola.

In my career as footballer, I hold the honor of not having commercialised my efforts and to have played only for the love of the sport. I was an 'amateur' in the broadest sense of the word.

— Croce about his career in football

== Titles ==
- Primera División (5): 1917, 1918, 1919, 1921, 1925
- Copa Honor MCBA (4): 1912, 1913, 1915, 1917
- Copa Ibarguren (2): 1917, 1918
- Copa Aldao (2): 1917, 1918
