= Alberto Marcovecchio =

Argentine association football player

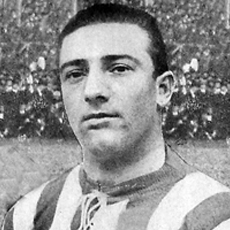

Personal information
- Full name: Alberto Andrés Marcovecchio
- Date of birth: March 6, 1893
- Place of birth: Avellaneda, Buenos Aires, Argentina
- Date of death: February 28, 1958 (aged 64)
- Place of death: Lanús, Argentina
- Position: Forward

Youth career
- Porteño
- 1910–1912: Racing Club

Senior career*
Years	Team	Apps	(Gls)
1912–1922	Racing Club	169	(118)

International career
1912–1919	Argentina	12	(7)
Medal record
Men's football
Representing Argentina
South American Championship
Runner-up	1916 Argentina
- * Club domestic league appearances and goals

Alberto Andrés Marcovecchio (March 6, 1893 – February 28, 1958) was an Argentine football player that spent all his career at Racing Club de Avellaneda. He played as a forward.

He was part of the outstanding Racing Club squad that won 8 titles between 1913 and 1921, 7 of them consecutively.

Between 1913 and 1922, he scored 118 goals in the Argentine Primera División, finishing as the top scorer in 1917 and 1919. Throughout his career, he scored scored 287 goals in official matches.

== Club career ==
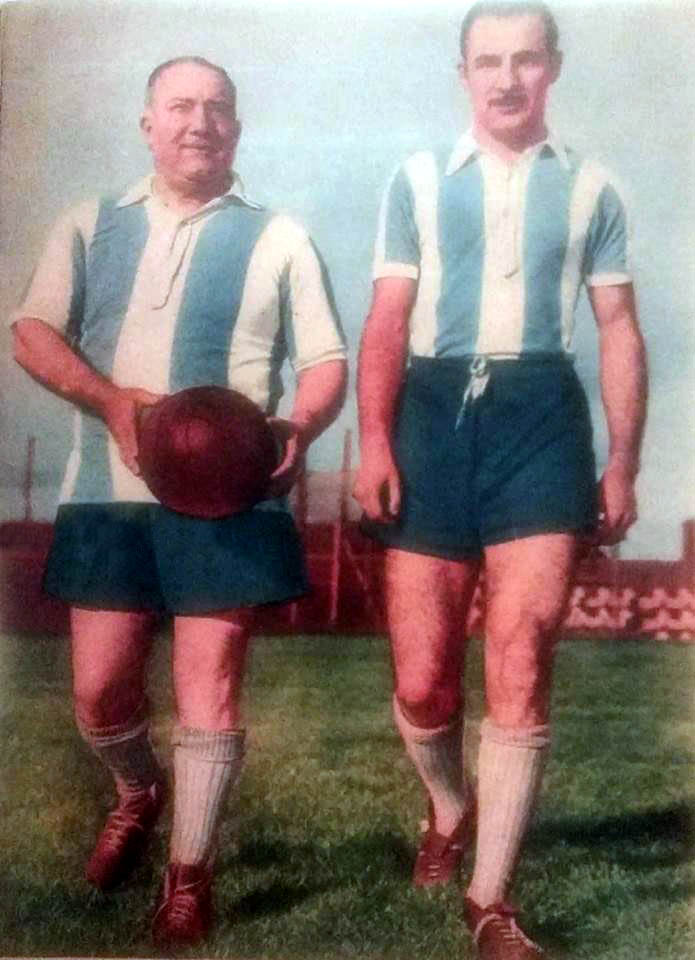
Marcovecchio (left) with Mario Boyé in a seniors match in 1949

After playing for a minor team of his neighborhood (Porteño), Marcovecchio started his youth career at Racing in 1910. Two years later he was promoted to the Primera División, starting a career that led him to win 20 trophies with the club.

In 1917, Marchovecchio was the season's top scorer with 18 goals in 20 games. In 1921, he won his last title with Racing Club before leaving football due to an injury.

== International career ==
With the Argentina national team, Marcovecchio played 12 games, making his debut in December 1912 against Uruguay. He was called up for the 1916 South American Championship and debuted against Chile, scoring two goals. His international career ended in 1919, when he represented Argentina in the Newton and Lipton Cups.

== Honours ==
=== Club ===
Racing

- Primera División (8): 1913, 1914, 1915, 1916, 1917, 1918, 1919, 1921
- Copa de Honor MCBA (4): 1912, 1913, 1915, 1917
- Copa Ibarguren (5): 1913, 1914, 1916, 1917, 1918
- Copa de Honor Cousenier: 1913
- Copa Aldao (2): 1917, 1918

=== Individual ===
- Primera División top scorer: 1917, 1919
