= Juan Perinetti =

Argentine footballer (1891–1957)

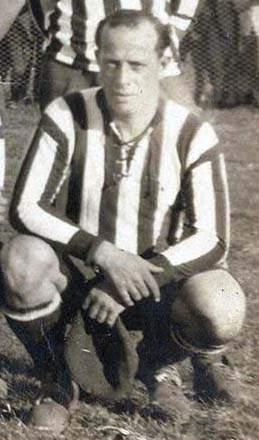
- Perinetti in 1925

Personal information
- Date of birth: 1891
- Place of birth: Remedios de Escalada, Argentina
- Date of death: 31 July 1957 (aged 65–66)
- Position: Forward

Senior career*
Years	Team	Apps	(Gls)
1906	Talleres de Remedios de Escalada		
1906–1924	Racing Club		
1925–1926	Talleres de Remedios de Escalada		

International career
1915–1919	Argentina	17	(0)
Medal record
Men's football
Representing Argentina
South American Championship
Runner-up	1916 Argentina
Runner-up	1917 Uruguay
Third place	1919 Brazil
- * Club domestic league appearances and goals

Juan Nelusco Perinetti (1891 – 31 July 1957) was an Argentine footballer.

== Career ==
Born in Remedios de Escalada, Buenos Aires Province, Perinetti joined Racing Club in 1906, having previously played for Talleres de Remedios de Escalada, a club where he was a founding member and later became president.

Perinetti was a key figure during Racing's golden era in the amateur leagues, contributing significantly to the club's unprecedented run of seven consecutive league titles between 1913 and 1919. Perinetti was a prolific goal-scorer, netting 99 goals for Racing, making him one of the club’s top scorers in its history.

In 1925, Perinetti returned to Talleres as captain and was a key figure in the team that won the Intermedia championship.

He played in 17 matches for the Argentina national football team from 1915 and 1919. He was also part of Argentina's squad for the 1916, 1917, and 1919 South American Championships.

== Honours ==
=== Player ===
==== Racing Club ====
- Primera División (7): 1913, 1914, 1915, 1916, 1917, 1918, 1919
- Copa de Honor: 1912, 1913, 1915, 1917
- Copa Ibarguren (5): 1913, 1914, 1916, 1917, 1918
- Copa de Honor Cousenier: 1913
- Copa Aldao: 1917, 1918

==== Talleres de Remedios de Escalada ====
- Argentine División Intermedia: 1925
