= 1918 Copa Aldao =

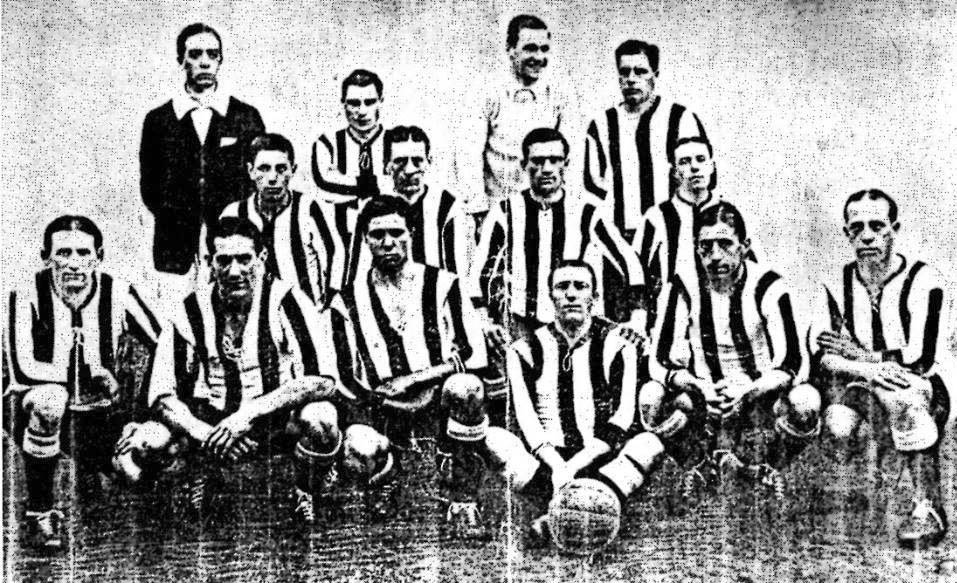
- A Racing team of 1918
- Event: Copa Aldao
Racing	Peñarol
(Argentina)	(Uruguay)
2	1
- Date: January 5, 1919
- Venue: Gimnasia y Esgrima, Buenos Aires
- Referee: Juan P. Barbera (Argentina)

The 1918 Copa Aldao was the final match to decide the winner of the Copa Aldao, the fourth edition of the international competition organised by the Argentine and Uruguayan Associations together. The final was contested by Argentine Racing Club de Avellaneda and Uruguayan club Peñarol.

The match was played at Gimnasia y Esgrima Stadium in Buenos Aires, and Racing beat Peñarol 2–1, winning its second Copa Aldao trophy in three consecutive finals contested.

== Qualified teams ==
Team	Qualification	Previous final app.
(Argentina) Racing Club	1918 Primera División champions	2 (1916, **1917**)
(Uruguay) Peñarol	1918 Primera División champions	(none)

- **Bold** indicates winning years

== Venue ==
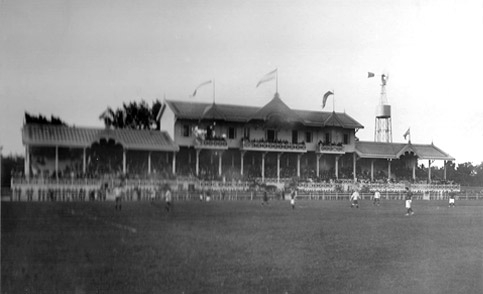
Estadio GEBA, venue

== Match details ==
1918 Copa Aldao
5 January 1919

Racing (Argentina)	2–1	(Uruguay) Peñarol
Marcovecchio 55'; Zabaleta 59'	Report	Gradín 51'

Estadio G.E.B.A., Buenos Aires
Referee: Juan P. Barbera (Argentina)

**Racing**	**Peñarol**

GK	(Argentina) Marcos Croce
DF	(Argentina) Roberto Castagnola
DF	(Argentina) Armando Reyes
MF	(Argentina) Nicolás Vivaldo
MF	(Argentina) Francisco Olazar
MF	(Argentina) Enrique Macchiavello
FW	(Argentina) Natalio Perinetti
FW	(Argentina) Albérico Zabaleta
FW	(Argentina) Alberto Marcovecchio
FW	(Argentina) Juan Hospital
FW	(Argentina) Juan Perinetti

GK	(Uruguay) Roberto Chery
DF	(Uruguay) José Benincasa
DF	(Uruguay) Ernesto Raffo
MF	(Uruguay) Jorge Pacheco
MF	(Uruguay) Juan Delgado
MF	(Uruguay) Pascual Ruotta
FW	(Uruguay) José Pérez
FW	(Uruguay) Armando Artigas
FW	(Uruguay) Guillermo Ángel Ferrero
FW	(Uruguay) Isabelino Gradín
FW	(Uruguay) Antonio Campolo
