= Francisco Olazar =

Argentine footballer and coach

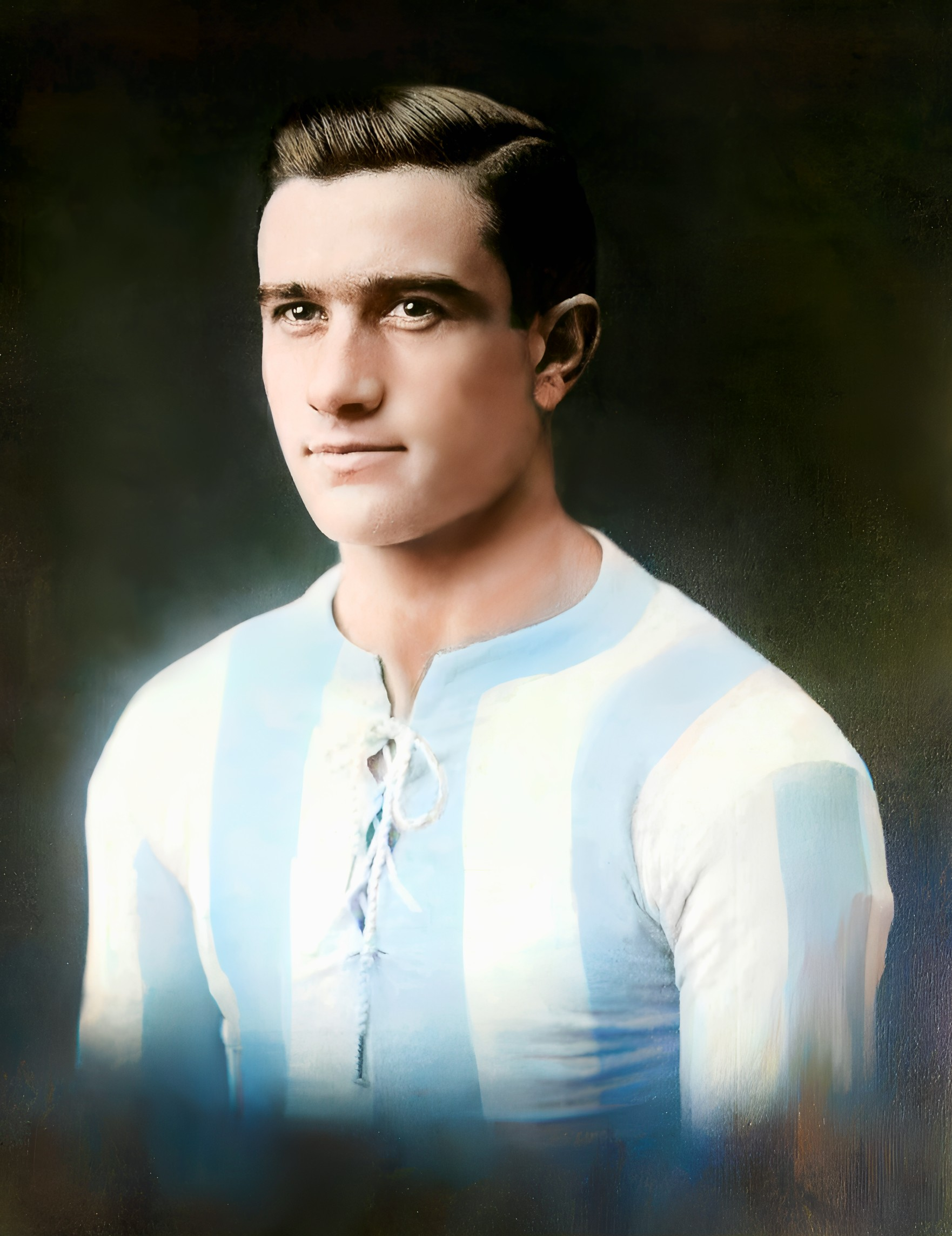

Personal information
- Full name: Francisco Olazar
- Date of birth: 10 July 1885
- Place of birth: Quilmes, Argentina
- Date of death: 21 September 1958 (aged 73)
- Place of death: Lomas de Zamora, Argentina
- Position: Central midfielder

Youth career
- Club Mariano Moreno
- 1908–1910: Racing Club

Senior career*
Years	Team	Apps	(Gls)
1910–1922	Racing Club		

International career
1916–1921	Argentina	17	(1)
Medal record
Men's football
Representing Argentina (as player)
South American Championship
Runner-up	1916 Argentina
Runner-up	1917 Uruguay
Representing Argentina (as manager)
South American Championship
Winner	1929 Argentina
FIFA World Cup
Runner-up	1930 Uruguay
- * Club domestic league appearances and goals

Francisco Olazar (10 July 1885 – 21 September 1958) was an Argentine football player and coach. He played as a central midfielder.

At club level, Olazar spent his entire career playing for Racing Club, winning eight Primera División league titles and eight national cups. He also played for and managed the Argentina national team, being the manager at the 1930 FIFA World Cup.

He was regarded as one of the best Argentine centre-half of this time.

== Career ==
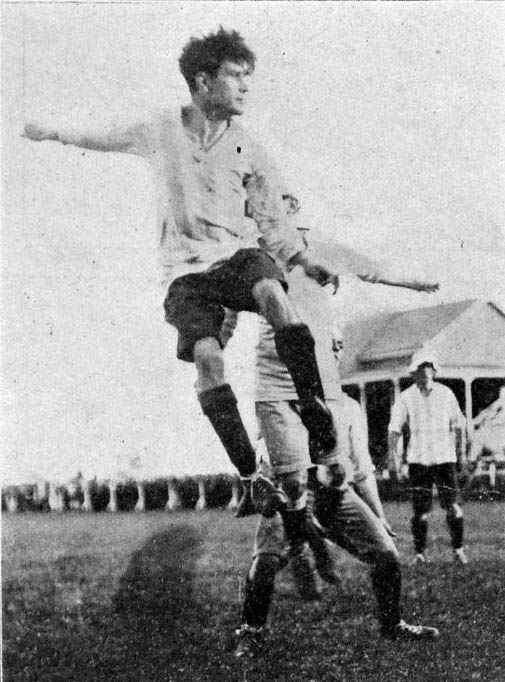
Olazar jumping to head the ball in a match v. San Isidro, 1919

=== Player ===
Olazar was born in Quilmes. He first played at Mariano Moreno, a small club in Avellaneda, Greater Buenos Aires. In 1908, he joined Racing Club, where he started playing at youth level.

Playing as a central midfielder, Olazar was an integral part of the Racing Club team that was known for their playing style and success, winning seven consecutive Primera División titles from 1913 to 1919, a record that still stands. He was one of the Racing Club's most notable players because of his technique and strength in recovering the ball. He also captained the team during the successful spell. He scored a total of 37 goals playing for Racing Club.

He played for the Argentina national team on 17 occasions, including appearances at the first two Copa América tournaments in 1916 and 1917.

=== Manager ===
After retiring as a player, Olazar turned to coaching and managed the Argentina team that won the Copa América in 1929. He was also the team's coach of the team that participated in the first FIFA World Cup in 1930, where he and technical director Juan José Tramutola managed La Albiceleste to second place behind hosts Uruguay.

== Honours ==
=== Player ===
Racing Club

- Primera División (8): 1913, 1914, 1915, 1916, 1917, 1918, 1919, 1921
- Copa de Honor: 1912, 1913, 1915, 1917
- Copa Ibarguren: 1913, 1914, 1916, 1917
- Copa de Honor Cousenier: 1913
- Copa Aldao: 1917, 1918

=== Manager ===
Argentina

- Copa América: 1929
- FIFA World Cup runner-up: 1930
