= 1907 Copa de Honor MCBA Final =

1907 Copa de Honor Final
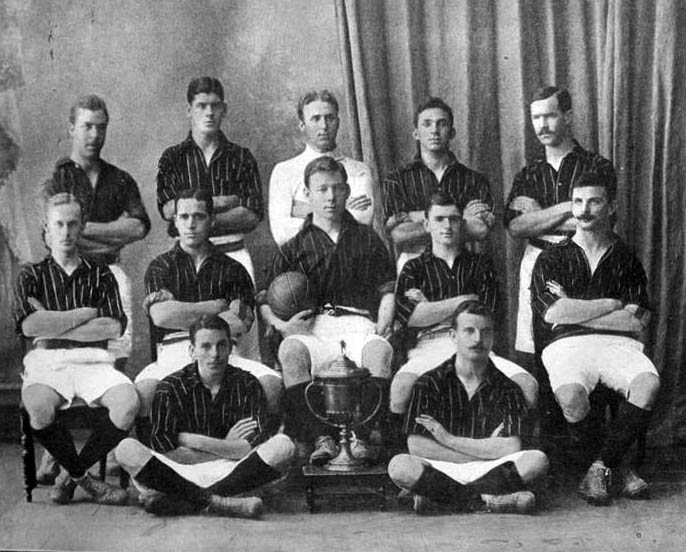
- A Belgrano A.C. team of 1907
- Event: 1907 Copa de Honor "Municipalidad de Buenos Aires"
Quilmes	Belgrano A.C.
1	3
- Date: 9 September 1907
- Venue: Quilmes Stadium, Quilmes

The 1907 Copa de Honor Municipalidad de Buenos Aires Final was the football match that decided the champion of the 3rd. edition of this National cup of Argentina. In the match, played at the Quilmes A.C. Stadium (also known as the "Quilmes Old Ground") in the homonymous city, Belgrano A.C. defeated Quilmes 3–1. to win their first Copa de Honor trophy.

== Qualified teams ==
Team	Previous final app.
Belgrano A.C.	(none)
Quilmes	1905

Note

- **Bold** indicates winning years

== Overview ==
The 1907 edition was contested by 10 clubs, 9 within Buenos Aires Province, and 1 from Liga Rosarina de Football. Playing in a single-elimination tournament, Belgrano eliminated Rosario Central 7–3, then defeating Reformer 2–0 in semifinals.

On the other hand, Estudiantes defeated Estudiantes de Buenos Aires 5–0, then eliminating San Isidro 2–1.

In the final, Belgrano defeated Quilmes 3–1, at the Quilmes Stadium to win their first Copa de Honor trophy.

== Road to the final ==
- H: home
- A: away
- N: neutral

Belgrano		Round	Quilmes	
Opponent	Result	Stage	Opponent	Result
–	–	Round of 8	–	–
Rosario Central	7–3 (H)	Quarterfinal	Estudiantes (BA)	5–0 (H)
Reformer	2–0 (A)	Semifinal	San Isidro	2–1 (H)

== Match details ==
1907 Copa de Honor MCBA Final
9 September 1907

Quilmes	1–3	Belgrano A.C.
H.C. Pearson	Report	C.H. Parr o.g.' C.H. Whaley; G.G. Stocks

Quilmes Stadium, Quilmes

**Quilmes**	**Belgrano A.C.**
