= 1915 Copa de Honor MCBA Final =

1915 Copa de Honor Final
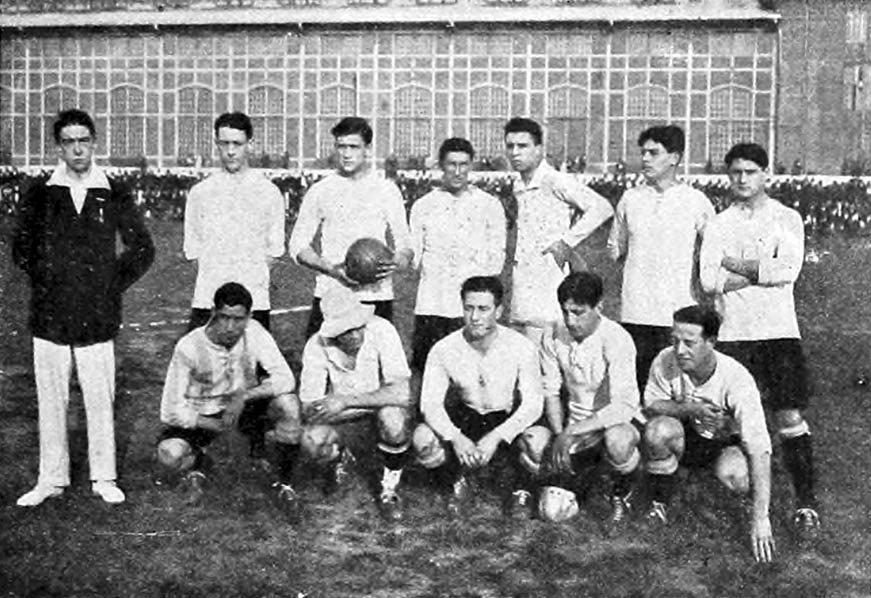
- A Racing team of 1915
- Event: 1915 Copa de Honor "Municipalidad de Buenos Aires"
Racing Club	Tiro Federal
2	1
- Date: 10 October 1915
- Venue: Racing Club Stadium, Avellaneda

The 1915 Copa de Honor Municipalidad de Buenos Aires was the final that decided the champion of the 10th. edition of this National cup of Argentina. In the match, held in Racing Club Stadium in Avellaneda, Racing Club beat Tiro Federal (that played its first final) 2–1, winning its third consecutive Copa de Honor trophy.

== Qualified teams ==
Team	Previous final app.
Racing Club	**1912, 1913**
Tiro Federal	(none)

Note

- **Bold** indicates winning years

== Overview ==
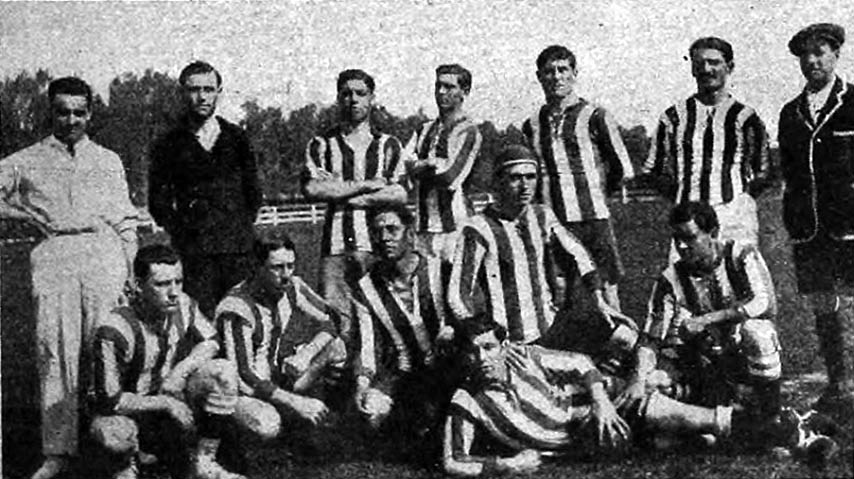
The Tiro Federal squad that beat Boca Juniors

The 1915 edition was contested by 30 clubs, 22 within Buenos Aires Province, and 8 from Liga Rosarina de Football. Playing in a single-elimination tournament, Racing beat Estudiantes de La Plata (5–0 in Avellaneda), Hispano Argentino (3–0 also in Avellaneda), Quilmes (1–0 after extra time). In the Buenos Aires' semifinal, Racing beat San Isidro 1–0 at Estadio G.E.B.A., qualifying to play the semifinal vs the Rosario representatives that had played another elimination stage. In the national semifinal, Racing defeated Central Córdoba (2–0 at GER).

On the other hand, Tiro Federal beat Newell's Old Boys (3–1 at Parque Independencia), Club Gimnasia y Esgrima (R) (3–3 and 3–2, both as visitor) qualifying for the semifinal vs the winner of Buenos Aires zone. In the national semifinal, Tiro Federal beat Boca Juniors (4–0, at GER).

The final was held in Racing Stadium, on October 10, 1915. Racing beat Tiro Federal 2–1, with goals by Alberto Ohaco and Alberto Marcovecchio, winning its third consecutive Copa de Honor trophy.

== Road to the final ==
- H: home
- A: away
- N: neutral

Racing		Round	Tiro Federal	
Opponent	Result	Stage	Opponent	Result
Estudiantes (LP)	5–0 (H)	Preliminary	Newell's Old Boys	3–1 (A)
Hispano Argentino	3–0 (H)	First Round	Gimnasia y Esgrima (R)	3–3 (a.e.t.) (A); 3–2 (A)
Quilmes	1–0 (a.e.t.) (H)	Second Round	– (Note: As the Rosario zone had less teams than the porteños, there were only two stages.)	
San Isidro	5–2 (A) (Note: According to the RSSSF, it was played at Estadio GEBA.)	Third Round	–	
Central Córdoba (R)	2–0 (A)	Semifinal (Note: Played between porteños and rosarinos teams.)	Boca Juniors	1–1 (a.e.t.) (N) (Note: Played at Estadio Racing Club.); 4–0 (N) (Note: At GER venue in Parque Independencia (although Tiro Federal had it own venue in Rosario).)

== Match details ==
1915 Copa de Honor MCBA Final
10 October 1915

Racing Club	2–1	Tiro Federal
Marcovecchio; Ohaco	Report	Guidi

Racing Club Stadium, Avellaneda

**Racing**	**Tiro Federal**

GK	(Argentina) Syla Arduino
DF	(Argentina) Salvador Presta
DF	(Argentina) Armando Reyes
MF	(Argentina) Ángel Betular
MF	(Argentina) Francisco Olazar
MF	(Argentina) Armando Pepe
FW	(Uruguay) Zoilo Canavery
FW	(Argentina) Alberto Ohaco
FW	(Argentina) Alberto Marcovecchio
FW	(Argentina) Juan Hospital
FW	(Argentina) Juan Perinetti

GK	(Argentina) Lorenzo C. Colombo
DF	(Argentina) Florencio Sarasíbar
DF	(Argentina) Oreste Scarponi
MF	(Argentina) Silvio Barbieri
MF	(Argentina) Manuel Argüelles
MF	(Argentina) Ernesto Faggiani
FW	(Argentina) Conrado Grieshaver
FW	(Argentina) Ernesto W. Simpson
FW	(Argentina) Juan Vergara
FW	(Argentina) Carlos Guidi
FW	(Argentina) Antonio Pimentel
