= Eduardo Blanco (footballer) =

Argentine footballer

Personal information
- Date of birth: 1897
- Place of birth: Rosario, Argentina
- Date of death: 1958 (aged 60–61)
- Place of death: Rosario, Argentina
- Position: Midfielder

Senior career*
Years	Team	Apps	(Gls)
1914-1918	Rosario Central	69	(10)

International career
1917–?	Argentina	2	(0)
- * Club domestic league appearances and goals

Eduardo Blanco (1897 – 1958) was an Argentine footballer who played as midfielder. Blanco spent all his career in Rosario Central, where he played from 1914 to 1918, winning three national titles and seven regional titles with the club.

Blanco debuted in Rosario Central in 1914, playing 69 matches and scoring 10 goals. Nevertheless, his career as player ended abruptly because of an injure to his left knee. Blanco became manager of Rosario Central in 1930.

Apart from his club career, Blanco was also capped for the Argentina national team, being part of the team that competed in the 1917 South American Championship, where Argentina was runner-up.

== Titles ==
Rosario Central

- Copa Ibarguren (1): 1915
- Copa de Honor MCBA (1): 1916
- Copa Jockey Club (1): 1916
- Copa Nicasio Vila (4): 1914, 1915, 1916, 1917
- Copa Damas de Caridad (3): 1914, 1915, 1916
