= 1909 Copa de Honor MCBA Final =

1909 Copa de Honor Final
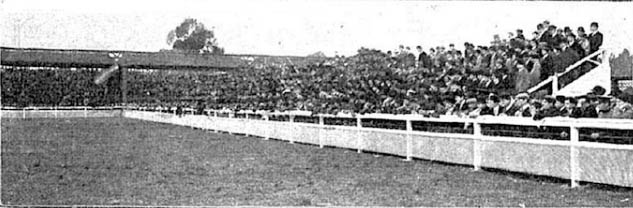
- Estadio GEBA, venue
- Event: 1909 Copa de Honor "Municipalidad de Buenos Aires"
San Isidro	Estudiantes (BA)
8	1
- Date: 3 October 1909
- Venue: Estadio GEBA, Buenos Aires

The 1909 Copa de Honor Municipalidad de Buenos Aires Final was the football match that decided the champion of the 5th. edition of this National cup of Argentina. In the match, held in the Estadio GEBA in Buenos Aires, San Isidro easily defeated Estudiantes de Buenos Aires 8–1 to win their first Copa de Honor trophy.

== Qualified teams ==
Team	Previous final app.
San Isidro	(none)
Estudiantes (BA)	1906

Note

- **Bold** indicates winning years

== Overview ==
The 1909 edition was contested by 11 clubs, 7 within Buenos Aires Province, and 4 from Liga Rosarina de Football. Playing in a single-elimination tournament, San Isidro eliminated Quilmes 2–1 and then Porteño 2–0 at Palermo in the tiebreaker match after both teams had tied 1–1. San Isidro did not play the semifinals, advancing directly to the final game.

On the other hand, Estudiantes eliminated Tiro Federal 4–2 in their venue in Palermo. Porteño then defeated Newell's Old Boys 3–2 also in Palermo, then beating River Plate 3–1 in Dársena Sur to earn their place as finalist.

In the final, San Isidro got a landslide victory over Estudiantes, beating them 8–1 at Estadio GEBA in Buenos Aires to win their first Copa de Honor trophy.

== Road to the final ==
- H: home
- A: away
- N: neutral

San Isidro		Round	Estudiantes (BA)	
Opponent	Result	Stage	Opponent	Result
Quilmes	2–1 (H)	Preliminary	Tiro Federal	4–2 (H)
Porteño	1–1 (H), 2–0 (A)	First round	Newell's Old Boys	3–2 (H)
– (Note: San Isidro advanced directly to the final.)	–	Semifinal	River Plate	3–1 (H)

== Match details ==
1909 Copa de Honor MCBA Final
3 October 1909

San Isidro	8–1	Estudiantes (BA)
	Report

Estadio GEBA, Buenos Aires

**San Isidro**	**Estudiantes (BA)**
