= Eduardo Blanco =

Eduardo Blanco may refer to:

- Eduardo Blanco (actor) (born 1958), Spanish/Argentine actor
- Eduardo Blanco (footballer) (1897–1958), Argentine footballer
- Eduardo Blanco (writer) (1838–1912), Venezuelan history writer and politician
