= 1917 Copa Ibarguren =

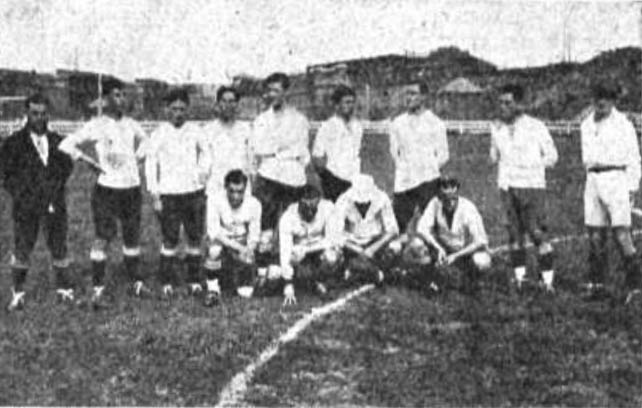
- Team of Racing, champions
Racing	Rosario Central
3	2
- Date: January 13, 1918; 107 years ago
- Venue: Gimnasia y Esgrima Stadium, Palermo, Buenos Aires
- Referee: E. Palma

The 1917 Copa Ibarguren was the fifth edition of this National cup of Argentina. It was played by the champions of both leagues, Primera División and Liga Rosarina de Football crowned during 1917.

Racing (Primera División champion) faced Rosario Central (Liga Rosarina champion), playing their 4th. consecutive final. The match was hosted at Gimnasia y Esgrima Stadium in Palermo, on January 13, 1918. Racing won 3–2 achieving its 4th trophy within 5 years.

== Qualified teams ==
Team	Qualification	Previous app.
Racing	1917 Primera División champion	**1913, 1914**, 1915, **1916**
Rosario Central	1917 Copa Nicasio Vila champion	1914, **1915**, 1916

Note

- **Bold** indicates winning years

== Match details ==
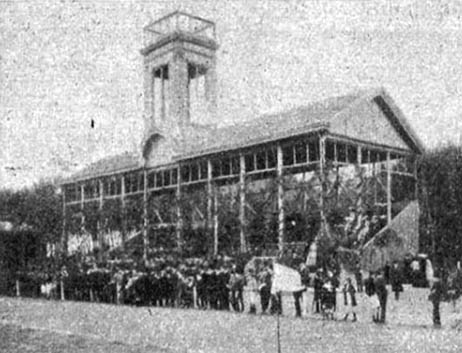
Estadio GEBA, venue

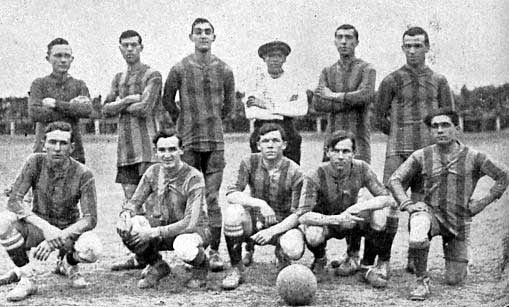
A Rosario Central team of 1918

1917 Copa Ibarguren
13 January 1918

Racing	3–2	Rosario Central
J. Perinetti 2'; Marcovecchio 42'; N. Perinetti 63'	Report	Blanco 15' (pen.); Clarke 85'

Gimnasia y Esgrima Stadium, Buenos Aires
Referee: E. Palma

**Rosario Central**

GK	(Argentina) Marcos Crocce
DF	(Argentina) Roberto Castagnola
DF	(Argentina) Armando Reyes
MF	(Argentina) Nicolás Vivaldo
MF	(Argentina) Francisco Olazar
MF	(Argentina) Ricardo Pepe
FW	(Argentina) Natalio Perinetti
FW	(Argentina) Alberto Ohaco
FW	(Argentina) Alberto Marcovecchio
FW	(Argentina) Rogelio Minondo
FW	(Argentina) Juan Perinetti

GK	(Argentina) Juan Bruno
DF	(Argentina) Zenón Díaz
DF	(Argentina) Patricio Clarke
MF	(Argentina) Pablo Molina
MF	(Argentina) Ernesto Blanco
MF	(Argentina) Jacinto Perazzo
FW	(Argentina) Manuel Mesa
FW	(Argentina) Antonio Blanco
FW	(Argentina) José Clarke
FW	(Argentina) Juan Enrique Hayes
FW	(Argentina) Alfredo Woodward
