= Ennis Hayes =

Argentine footballer (1896–1956)

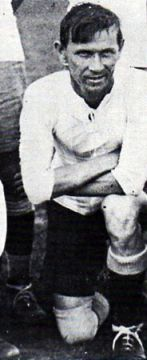
- Hayes with the Argentina national team

Personal information
- Full name: Ernesto Hayes
- Date of birth: 10 May 1896
- Place of birth: Rosario, Argentina
- Date of death: 6 February 1956 (aged 59)
- Place of death: Rosario, Argentina
- Position: Forward

Senior career*
Years	Team	Apps	(Gls)
1912	Rosario Central		
1913	Club Embarcadero		
1913–1923	Rosario Central		
1924	Gimnasia y Esgrima SF		
1925	Tiro Federal		
1926	Gimnasia y Esgrima SF		
1927	Rosario Central		

International career
1915–1918	Argentina	11	(4)
Medal record
Men's football
Representing Argentina
South American Championship
Runner-up	1916 Argentina
Runner-up	1917 Uruguay
- * Club domestic league appearances and goals

Ernesto "Ennis" Hayes (10 May 1896 – 6 February 1956) was an Argentine footballer who played as a forward. He played most of his career at Rosario Central, being also called for the Argentina national team.

Together with his brother Harry, he is considered one of the first club idols.

He won 19 trophies with Rosario Central.

== Early and personal life ==
Hayes was born in Rosario on 10 May 1896, the son of an English father. His brother Harry was also a notable footballer for Rosario Central, remaining nowadays as the all-time top scorer of the club.

== Club career ==
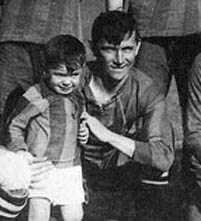
Hayes posing with a child in 1923

He began his club career with Rosario Central at the age of 16, in 1912. A year later he had a brief spell with Club Embarcadero, before returning to Rosario Central, where he remained until 1923, winning several titles. He had brief tenures on Gimnasia y Esgrima de Santa Fe and Tiro Federal before returning to Rosario Central, where he would retire in 1927.

Hayes is credited with 134 goals in 167 games for Rosario Central, ranking second among the all-time top scorers, after his brother Harry. Other statistics state Hayes scored 154 goals in 181 matches.

Hayes retired from playing on 17 April 1927, against arch-rival Newell's Old Boys. Hayes also remained the second top scorer of the Rosario derby with 9 goals, after his brother Harry (24).

== International career ==
Hayes earned 11 caps for the Argentina national team between 1915 and 1918, scoring four goals, and winning five friendly titles. He also played the 1916 and 1917 South American Championships.

== Playing style ==
A skilled player, Hayes played as left insider, sometimes as right insider because of his ability with both legs. On the other hand, he had a conflictive character that brought him some problems. In 1917 Hayes was banned from playing in national competitions after punching a referee in a Copa de Honor MCBA match v Racing. Nevertheless, the punishment was revoked two years later, allowing him to return to competitions. A new controversy came in a match v Club Argentino, when, after dribling all rival defenders and even the goalkeeper, he stopped and sat on the ball waiting for more rivals instead of scoring a goal.

== Honours ==
=== Rosario Central ===
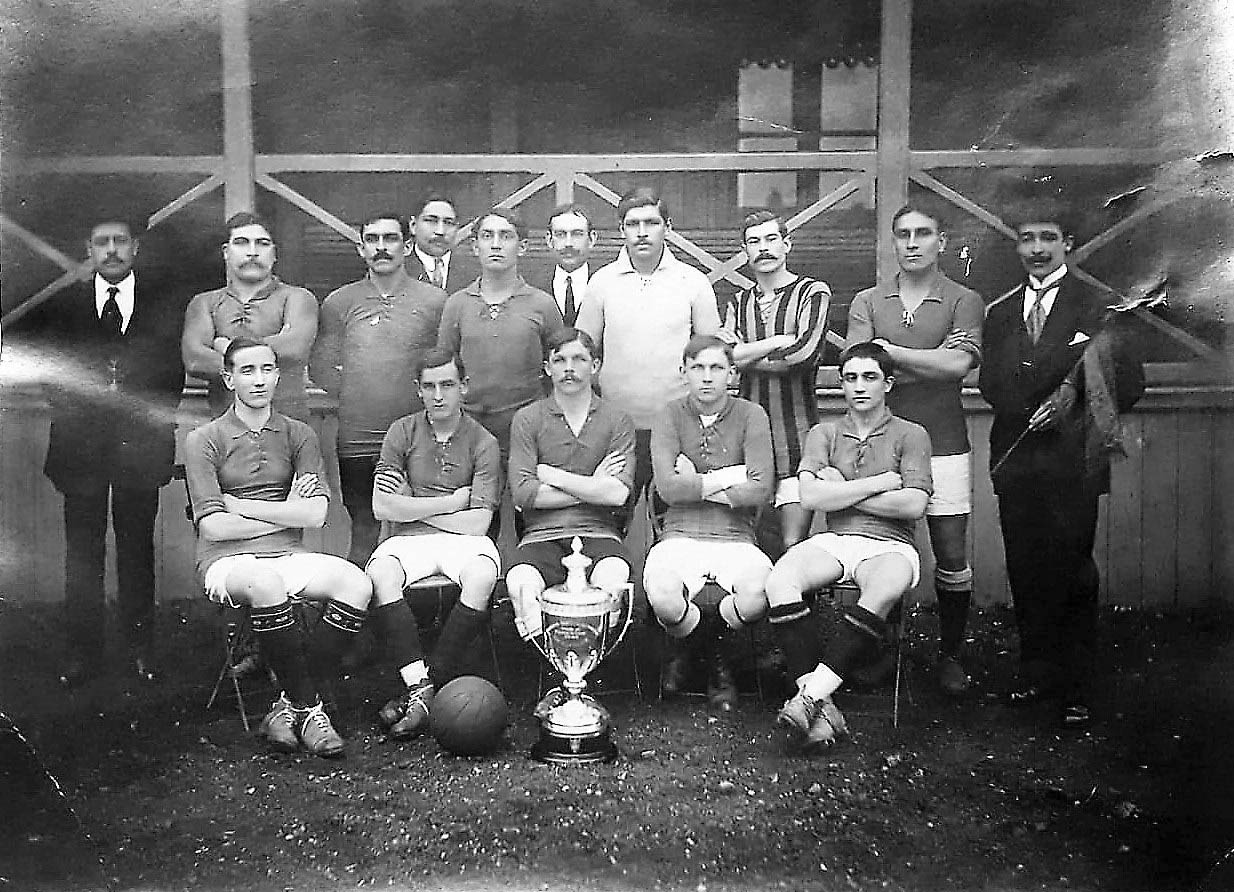
Hayes (seated, second from right) with the Rosario Central team, posing with the Copa de Competencia La Nación trophy in 1913

- Copa de Competencia La Nación: 1913
- Copa Ibarguren: 1915
- Copa Honor MCBA: 1916
- Copa de Competencia Jockey Club: 1916
- Copa Competencia (AAmF): 1920
- Copa Nicasio Vila (7): 1914, 1915, 1916, 1917, 1919, 1923, 1927
- Copa Damas de Caridad: 1914, 1915, 1916
- Federación Rosarina de Football (Note: Dissident body from Liga Rosarina; lasted from 1912 to 1914.): 1913
- Asociación Amateurs Rosarina de Football: 1920, 1921
- Copa Estímulo: 1922

=== Tiro Federal ===
- Copa Nicasio Vila (1): 1925.

=== Argentina ===
- Copa Premier Honor Uruguayo: 1915
- Copa Círculo de la Prensa: 1916
- Copa Lipton: 1916, 1918
- Copa Newton: 1918
- Copa Premier Honor Argentino: 1918
