= Estadio Belgrano Athletic =

Multi-use stadium in Buenos Aires, Argentina

Belgrano Athletic Stadium
- Estadio Belgrano Athletic
- Virrey del Pino
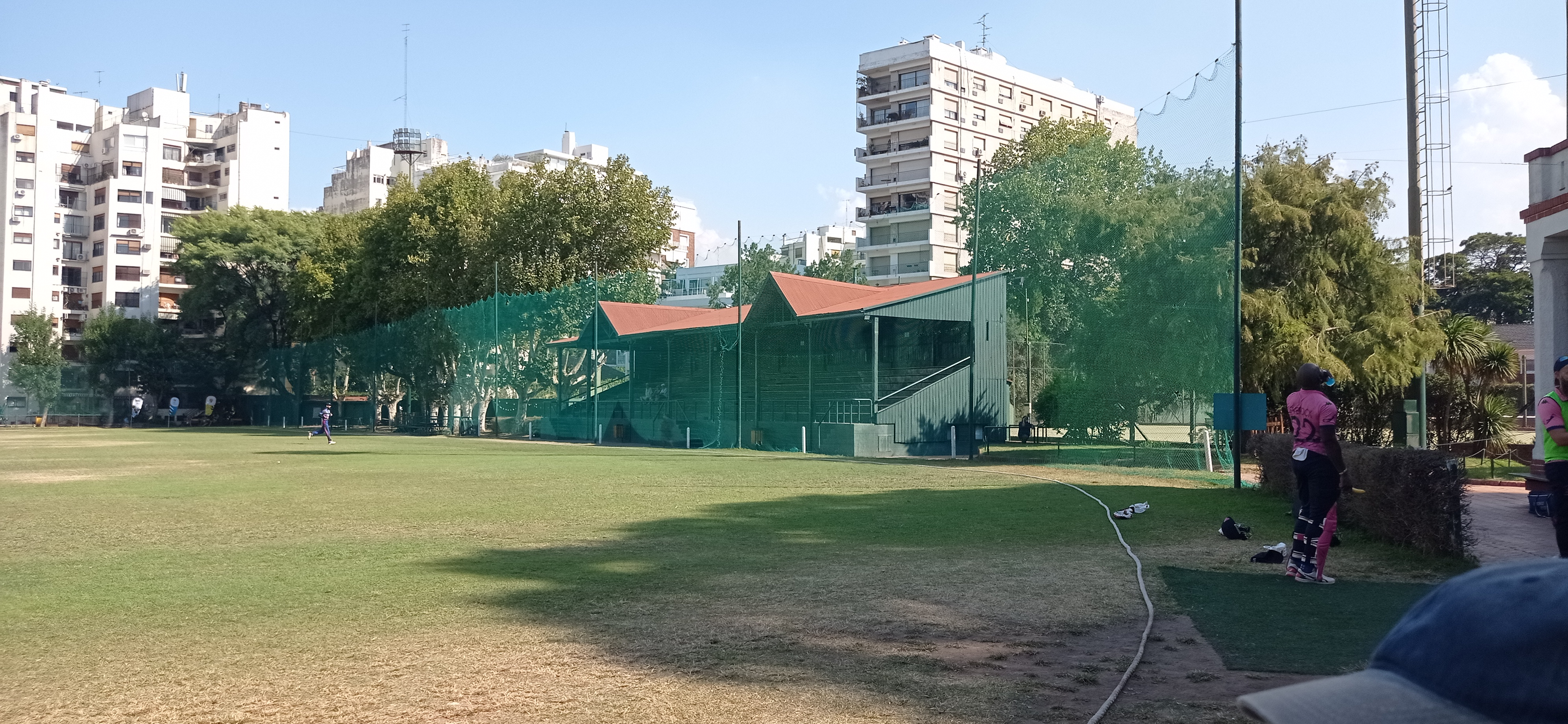
- The stadium in 2023
- Interactive map of Belgrano Athletic Stadium
- Address: Virrey del Pino 3456; Buenos Aires; Argentina
- Location: Belgrano, Buenos Aires
- Coordinates: 34.5736°S 58.4632°W
- Owner: Belgrano A.C.
- Capacity: 500
- Type: Stadium
- Surface: Grass
- Current use: Rugby union Cricket

Construction
- Opened: 1902; 124 years ago

Tenants
- Belgrano A.C. rugby (1902–present); Belgrano A.C. cricket (1912–present); Belgrano A.C. football (1902–16); Argentina national cricket team

The Estadio Belgrano Athletic, popularly known as Virrey del Pino (as the name of the street where it is located on) is a stadium located in the Belgrano neighborhood of Buenos Aires, Argentina. It is owned and operated by Belgrano Athletic Club, and has a capacity of 500 spectators.

The stadium serves as BAC's home venue for its rugby union and cricket matches. In the past, Virrey del Pino also hosted football matches until 1916 when the club disaffiliated from AFA and abandoned the practise of the sport.

Having been acquired by the club in 1902, the stadium is one of the oldest sports venues in existence in the city of Buenos Aires.

== History ==
Soon after being established, Belgrano A.C. set its headquarters in the land located on Virrey del Pino and Superí streets, which was rented to the heirs of F. Chas. Nevertheless, the club would move after the owner forced it to buy the land. As Belgrano A.C. did not have the funds, they were evicted from it.

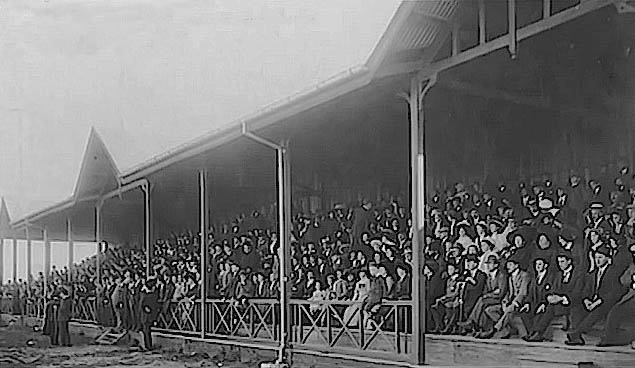
The official stand in 1910. It has kept its original style since it was inaugurated in early 1900s

Between 1899 and 1902 Belgrano A.C. played their home matches in a field located on La Pampa and Melián streets close to Buenos Aires English High School, until the club acquired a land on Superí street to H. W. Roberts and Charles E. Dickinson (who were also members of the club and, in the case of Dickinson, a notable footballer for Belgrano and also the Argentina national team, having been the scorer of the Argentina's first goal ever. Roberts and Dickinson had bought the lands years ago and they offered it to the club at the same price of the purchase.

The stadium has a unique roof stand, with capacity for 500 spectators. The original wooden stand had been destroyed by fire, but the club built an exact replica of it, keeping the architectural style of the 1900s.

In early 1900s, the Belgrano A.C. field was venue of some domestic cups finals such as Copa de Competencia Jockey Club (hosted the 1907 and 1908 finals, both won by Alumni, which did not have an own field), and Copa de Honor Municipalidad de Buenos Aires in 1906, when Alumni beat Estudiantes de Buenos Aires 3–1 on 9 September.

On 3 May 1908 Boca Juniors played their first official game (in tournaments organised by AFA) at Virrey del Pino stadium. It was the first round of the 1908 Segunda División season, with the visitor defeating Belgrano A.C. II 3–1.

== Football matches ==
Apart from the home games of Belgrano Athletic, the venue hosted some finals of domestic and international cup competitions during the early 1900. They are listed below:

Date	Event	Team 1	Score	Team 2
8 Sep 1907	1907 Copa Jockey Club final	Alumni	4–2	Belgrano A.C.
2 Aug 1908	1908 Copa Jockey Club final	Alumni	5–0	Argentino (Q)
6 Sep 1908	1908 Tie Cup final	Alumni (Argentina)	4–0	(Uruguay) Wanderers

== Cricket matches ==
Belgrano Athletic Club Ground
- Interactive map of Belgrano Athletic Club Ground

Ground information
- Location: Belgrano, Buenos Aires
- End names
- Clubouse End; Incas End

International information
- First men's T20I: 22 February 2023: Argentina v Bermuda
- Last men's T20I: 15 December 2024: Bahamas v Bermuda
- As of 15 December 2024; Source: ESPNcricinfo

The first recorded cricket match held at BAC's cricket ground came in 1912 when the Northern Suburbs played vs Marylebone Cricket Club, which was touring on South America. First-class cricket was first played there in 1927 when Argentina played the Marylebone Cricket Club. Five further first-class matches were played there, the last of which saw Argentina play Sir TEW Brinckman's XI in 1938.

Still in use to the present day, the ground held matches in the South American Championships and the Americas Championships in recent times, as well as hosting matches in the 2009 ICC World Cricket League Division Three. In February–March 2023, the ground played host to three Twenty20 International matches in the 2023 ICC Men's T20 World Cup Americas Qualifier Sub-regional Qualifier.

=== Records ===
==== Twenty20 International ====
- Highest team total: 226 for 4 (20 overs) by Bermuda v Argentina, 2022/23
- Lowest team total: 110 for 9 (20 overs) by Argentina v Bermuda, as above
- Highest individual innings: 103 by Kamau Leverock for Bermuda v Argentina, as above
- Best bowling in an innings: 4-11 by Delray Rawlins, as above

==== First-class ====
- Highest team total: 426 all out by Sir J. Cahn's XI v Argentina, 1929/30
- Lowest team total: 101 all out by Argentina v Marylebone Cricket Club, 1926/27
- Highest individual innings: 162 by Bob Wyatt for Sir T. E. W. Brinckman's XI v Argentina, 1937/38
- Best bowling in an innings: 7-108 by Jim Sims, as above
- Best bowling in a match: 12-174 by Jim Sims, as above
