= 1920 Copa de Honor MCBA Final =

1920 Copa de Honor Final
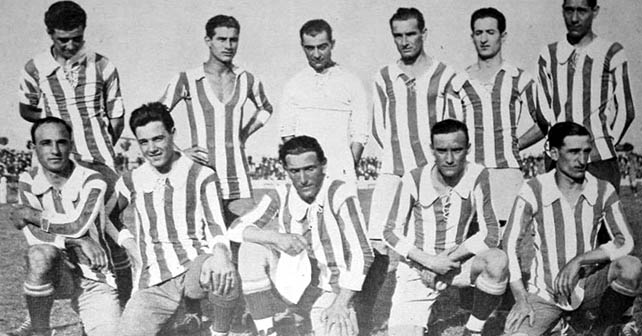
- Banfield, champions
- Event: 1920 Copa de Honor "Municipalidad de Buenos Aires"
Banfield	Boca Juniors
2	1
- Date: January 30, 1921; 105 years ago
- Venue: Sp. Barracas, Buenos Aires
- Referee: Diez

The 1920 Copa de Honor Municipalidad de Buenos Aires was the final that decided the champion of the 14th (and last) edition of this National cup of Argentina. In the match, held in Sportivo Barracas on January 30, 1921, Banfield won its first title in the top division after beating Boca Juniors 2–1.

== Qualified teams ==
Team	Previous final app.
Boca Juniors	(none)
Argentinos Juniors	(none)

- **Bold** indicates winning years

== Overview ==
The 1925 edition was contested by 16 clubs, 14 within Buenos Aires Province and 2 from Liga Rosarina de Football participating in the competition. Playing in a single-elimination tournament, Boca Juniors reached the final after eliminating Sportivo Barracas (3–0), Huracán (2–0), Almagro (2–0), and Newell's Old Boys (3–2 in semifinal).

On the other side, Banfield had been eliminated by Almagro (then beat by Boca) in playoff 1–0, but the disaffiliation of Lanús from the AFA caused the Association reprogrammed the competition. As a result, Banfield had a new chance, where the team beat Estudiantes de La Plata (unknown score), Sportivo Barracas (3–1), Porteño (4–0) and Tiro Federal (2–1 in semifinal).

The final was held in Sportivo Barracas Stadium on January 30, 1921. Boca Juniors's Marcelino Martínez scored the first goal on 23 minutes, but Banfield finally won the match with goals of Pambrún and López, achieving its first title in the top division of Argentina.

== Road to the final ==
Keys

Original tournament, then abandoned after participating teams disaffiliated from AFA.

Tournament re-started, with dissafiliated clubs replaced.

Banfield		Round	Boca Juniors	
Opponent	Result	Group stage	Opponent	Result
–		Round of 16	Sp. Barracas	3–0 (H)
Almagro	1–1, 0–1 (A) (Note: Almagro won 2–1 on points, Banfield eliminated.)	Round of 8	Huracán	2–0 (H)
– (Note: Banfield had been eliminated by Almagro.)		Quarter final	Almagro	2–0 (H)
–		Semifinal	Newell's Old Boys	3–2 (H) (Note: Played at Estadio Sportivo Barracas.)
Estudiantes (LP) (Note: Banfield had been eliminated from the competition, but returned due to replace Lanús, which had disaffiliated to join dissident Asociación Amateurs de Football.)	wp–lp (H) (Note: Won points (and qualification) due to Estudiantes did not contested the match.)	Round of 16 (Note: Tournament re-started by the AFA after some clubs left the association.)	– (Note: Boca Juniors had earned their place in the final before the tournament were suspended by AFA.)	
Sp. Barracas	3–1 (H)	Round of 8	–	
Porteño	4–0 (H)	Quarter final	–	
Tiro Federal	2–1 (A)	Semifinal	–	

== Match details ==
1920 Copa de Honor MCBA Final
30 January 1921

Banfield	2–1	Boca Juniors
Pambrún 50'; A. López 66'	Report	Martínez 23'

Estadio Sportivo Barracas, Buenos Aires
Referee: Diez

**Banfield**	**Boca Juniors**

GK	(Argentina) Lorenzo Bermani
DF	(Argentina) Atilio Brameri
DF	(Argentina) Carlos Vera
MF	(Argentina) Adolfo Frumento
MF	(Argentina) Fermín Cernich
MF	(Argentina) Juan Aragú
FW	(Argentina) Raúl López
FW	(Argentina) Adolfo López
FW	(Argentina) Fausto Lucarelli
FW	(Argentina) Bernardo Pambrún
FW	(Argentina) Severiano Álvarez

GK	(Argentina) Américo Tesoriere
DF	(Argentina) Antonio Cortella
DF	(Argentina) José Ortega
MF	(Argentina) José A. López
MF	(Argentina) Mario Busso
MF	(Argentina) Dionisio Becaas
FW	(Argentina) Pedro Calomino
FW	(Argentina) Pablo Bozzo
FW	(Argentina) Alfredo Martín
FW	(Argentina) Felipe Galíndez
FW	(Argentina) Marcelino Martínez
