= 1917 Copa Aldao =

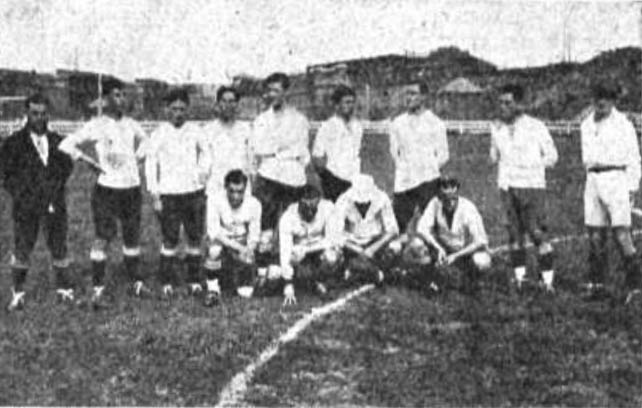
- A Racing team of 1917
- Event: Copa Aldao
Nacional	Racing
(Uruguay)	(Argentina)
2	2
- Date: April 19, 1918
- Venue: Parque Pereyra, Montevideo
- Referee: Álvaro Saralegui (Uruguay)

1917 Copa Aldao Playoff
- Event: Copa Aldao
Racing	Nacional
(Argentina)	(Uruguay)
2	1
- Date: July 9, 1918
- Venue: Gimnasia y Esgrima, Buenos Aires

The 1917 Copa Aldao was the final match to decide the winner of the Copa Aldao, the third edition of the international competition organised by the Argentine and Uruguayan Associations together. The final was contested by Argentine Racing Club de Avellaneda and Uruguayan Club Nacional de Football.

The final was held in Parque Pereyra in Montevideo on April 19, 1918. As the match ended 1–1, a playoff was scheduled for July 9 at Gimnasia y Esgrima in Buenos Aires to determine a champion. In that match, Racing beat Nacional 2–1 taking revenge from the previous edition and achieving its first Copa Aldao trophy.

== Qualified teams ==
Team	Qualification	Previous final app.
(Argentina) Racing	1917 Primera División champions	1916
(Uruguay) Nacional	1917 Primera División champions	**1916**

- **Bold** indicates winning years

== Venues ==
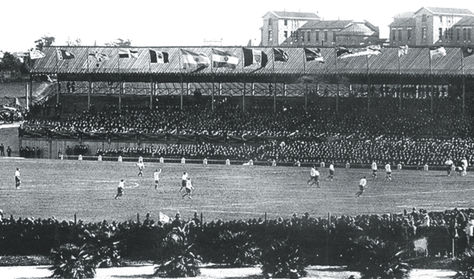
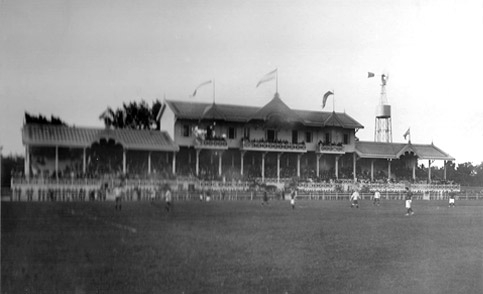
Parque Pereyra (left) and Gimnasia y Esgrima, venues of the matches played in Montevideo and Buenos Aires respectively

== Match details ==
=== Final ===
1917 Copa Aldao
19 April 1918
Final

Nacional (Uruguay)	2–2	(Argentina) Racing
Zibecchi 25'; Somma 61'	Report	J. Perinetti 20'; Vivaldo 60'

Parque Pereyra, Montevideo
Referee: Álvaro Saralegui (Uruguay)

**Nacional**	**Racing**

GK	(Uruguay) Santiago Demarchi
DF	(Uruguay) Antonio Urdinarán
DF	(Uruguay) Alfredo Foglino
MF	(Uruguay) Pedro Olivieri
MF	(Uruguay) Alfredo Zibecchi
MF	(Uruguay) José Vanzzino
FW	(Uruguay) José Brachi
FW	(Uruguay) Héctor Scarone
FW	(Uruguay) Ángel Romano
FW	(Uruguay) Carlos Scarone
FW	(Uruguay) Pascual Somma

GK	(Argentina) Marcos Crocce
DF	(Argentina) Roberto Castagnola
DF	(Argentina) Armando Reyes
MF	(Argentina) Alberto Marcovecchio
MF	(Argentina) Francisco Olazar
MF	(Argentina) Ricardo Pepe
FW	(Argentina) Natalio Perinetti
FW	(Argentina) Juan Hospital
FW	(Argentina) Alberto Ohaco
FW	(Argentina) Nicolás Vivaldo
FW	(Argentina) Juan Perinetti

=== Playoff ===
9 July 1918
Playoff

Racing (Argentina)	2–1	(Uruguay) Nacional
Zibecchi 11'	Report	Olazar 19'; Ohaco 33'

Gimnasia y Esgrima, Buenos Aires

**Racing**	**Nacional**

GK	(Argentina) Marcos Crocce
DF	(Argentina) Roberto Castagnola
DF	(Argentina) Armando Reyes
MF	(Argentina) Alberto Marcovecchio
MF	(Argentina) Francisco Olazar
MF	(Argentina) Enrique Macchiavello
FW	(Argentina) Natalio Perinetti
FW	(Argentina) Pedro Sala
FW	(Argentina) Alberto Ohaco
FW	(Argentina) Nicolás Vivaldo
FW	(Argentina) Juan Perinetti

GK	(Uruguay) Luis Ares
DF	(Uruguay) Antonio Urdinarán
DF	(Uruguay) Alfredo Foglino
MF	(Uruguay) Pedro Olivieri
MF	(Uruguay) Alfredo Zibecchi
MF	(Uruguay) José Vanzzino
FW	(Uruguay) Enrique Zubillaga
FW	(Uruguay) Héctor Scarone
FW	(Uruguay) Ángel Romano
FW	(Uruguay) Rodolfo Marán
FW	(Uruguay) Pascual Somma
