= Estadio Guido y Sarmiento =

Defunct football stadium in Quilmes, Argentina

Guido y Sarmiento Stadium
- Estadio Guido y Sarmiento

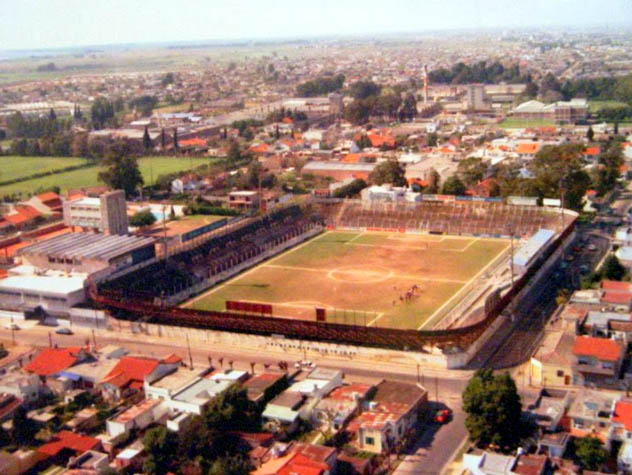
- The stadium in 1978
- Interactive map of Guido y Sarmiento Stadium
- Address: Guido y Sarmiento; Quilmes; Argentina
- Owner: Quilmes A.C.
- Type: Stadium

Construction
- Opened: 1900 (Note: Although there are records of cricket matches played at least in 1898, the date of inauguration refers to the first official match played by Quilmes in Primera División.)
- Closed: 1995
- Demolished: 1996; 30 years ago

Tenant
- Quilmes (1900–1995)

Estadio Guido y Sarmiento was a football stadium located in the city Quilmes of Greater Buenos Aires area in Argentina. It was owned and operated by Quilmes A.C. and used until 1995 when Estadio Centenario was opened.

The stadium was active since 1900, also hosting cricket matches during its first years of existence. It was the oldest existing football stadium in Argentina until 1995 when it was dismantled.

== History ==
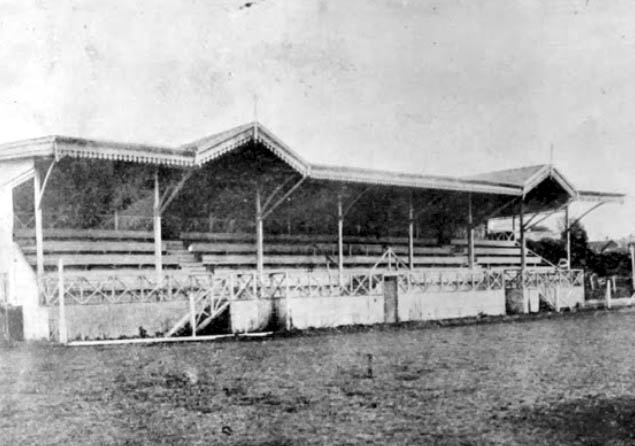
Official grandstand in 1922

The club (originally named "Quilmes Cricket Club") established its sports field on the corner of Guido and pringles street, then moving it a few meters to west (Guido and Sarmiento).

The first Primera División match at "Guido y Sarmiento" was on 14 June 1900, when Quilmes C.C. was defeated by Buenos Aires English High School 4–0. During its first years of existence, the stadium did not have grandstand, and the field was also used for other sports such as cricket (in Summer time). The first rooftop stand was built around 1910.

With the arrival of professionalism in 1931, the stadium would be refurbished, expanding its capacity. In the 1950 a lateral grandstand was built. By those years, the stadium also had two grandstands on Guido and Solís street, and an official stand on Sarmiento (the roof had been arsoned in the 1920s and never rebuilt). During the 1960s and 1970s, press booths were built in the stadium

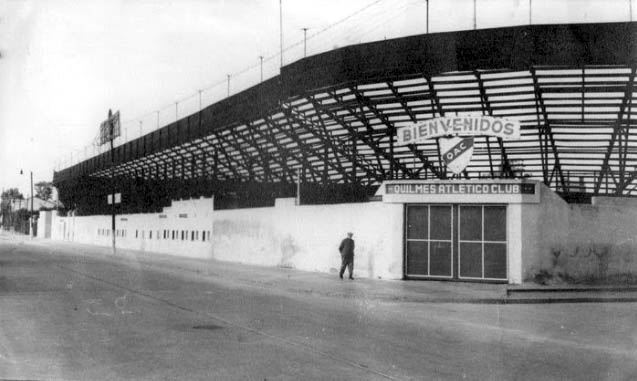
Entrance to the stadium in the 1960s

When Quilmes played the Copa Libertadores for the first time in 1979, the stadium had to be refurbished to fit Conmebol's rules for international competitions, therefore one of the grandstands was moved.

By late 1980s the stadium was seriously deteriorated. In 1987 the club announced the construction of a new stadium located 1,5 km from Guido y Sarmiento, which would be inaugurated in a friendly match vs Uruguayan club Nacional in 1995. Nevertheless, the Guido y Sarmiento venue was used for official matches until 25 June 1995, when Quilmes played vs Godoy Cruz a match of 1994–95 Primera B Nacional's Torneo Reducido.

Nevertheless, the stadium hosted its last match when the youth squads of Quilmes and Boca Juniors played an exhibition in December 1995. After that, the venue was dismantled to build an apartment complex on that land.

== Sporting Events ==
The stadium was the venue for some international football matches during the early football years in Argentina. Events organised include Tie Cup, Copa de Honor Municipalidad de Buenos Aires, and Copa de Competencia Jockey Club final matches.

=== Football ===
Date	Event	Team 1	Score	Team 2
30 Aug 1906	1906 Tie Cup final	Alumni	10–1	Belgrano A.C.
9 Sep 1907	1907 Copa de Honor MCBA Final	Quilmes	1–3	Belgrano A.C.
?, 1908	1908 Copa de Honor MCBA Final	Quilmes	2–1	Porteño
27 Oct 1912	1912 Copa Jockey Club final (Note: Playoff match only. The original final had been held in C.A. San Isidro field.)	Quilmes	1–2	San Isidro
