= 1906 Copa de Honor MCBA Final =

1906 Copa de Honor Final
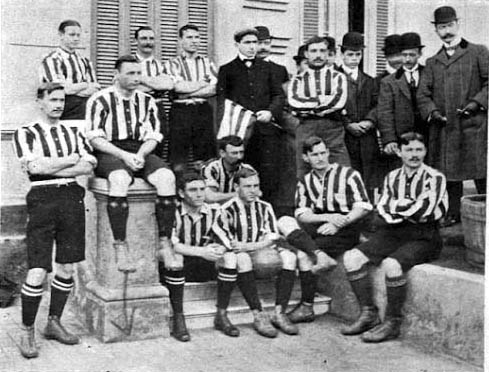
- An Alumni team of 1906
- Event: 1906 Copa de Honor "Municipalidad de Buenos Aires"
Alumni	Estudiantes (BA)
3	1
- Date: 9 September 1906
- Venue: Belgrano Athletic, Buenos Aires

The 1906 Copa de Honor Municipalidad de Buenos Aires Final was the football match that decided the champion of the 2nd. edition of this National cup of Argentina. In the match, held in the Estadio Belgrano Athletic (Virrey del Pino) in Buenos Aires, Alumni defeated Estudiantes de Buenos Aires 3–1. to win their second Copa de Honor trophy.

== Qualified teams ==
Team	Previous final app.
Alumni	**1905**
Estudiantes (BA)	(none)

Note

- **Bold** indicates winning years

== Overview ==
The 1906 edition was contested by 11 clubs, 10 within Buenos Aires Province, and 1 from Liga Rosarina de Football. Playing in a single-elimination tournament, Alumni eliminated Rosario Central (6–0 in Rosario), then defeating Argentino de Quilmes at Sociedad Sportiva Argentina in Palermo.

On the other hand, Estudiantes defeated Barracas A.C. 3–1, advancing to the semifinals where the team beat Quilmes 3–2.

The final was held in the Estadio Belgrano Athletic on Virrey del Pino and Superí streets in Belgrano, Buenos Aires, on 9 September 1906. Alumni defeated Estudiantes 3–1, to win their second consecutive Copa de Honor trophy.

== Road to the final ==
- H: home
- A: away
- N: neutral

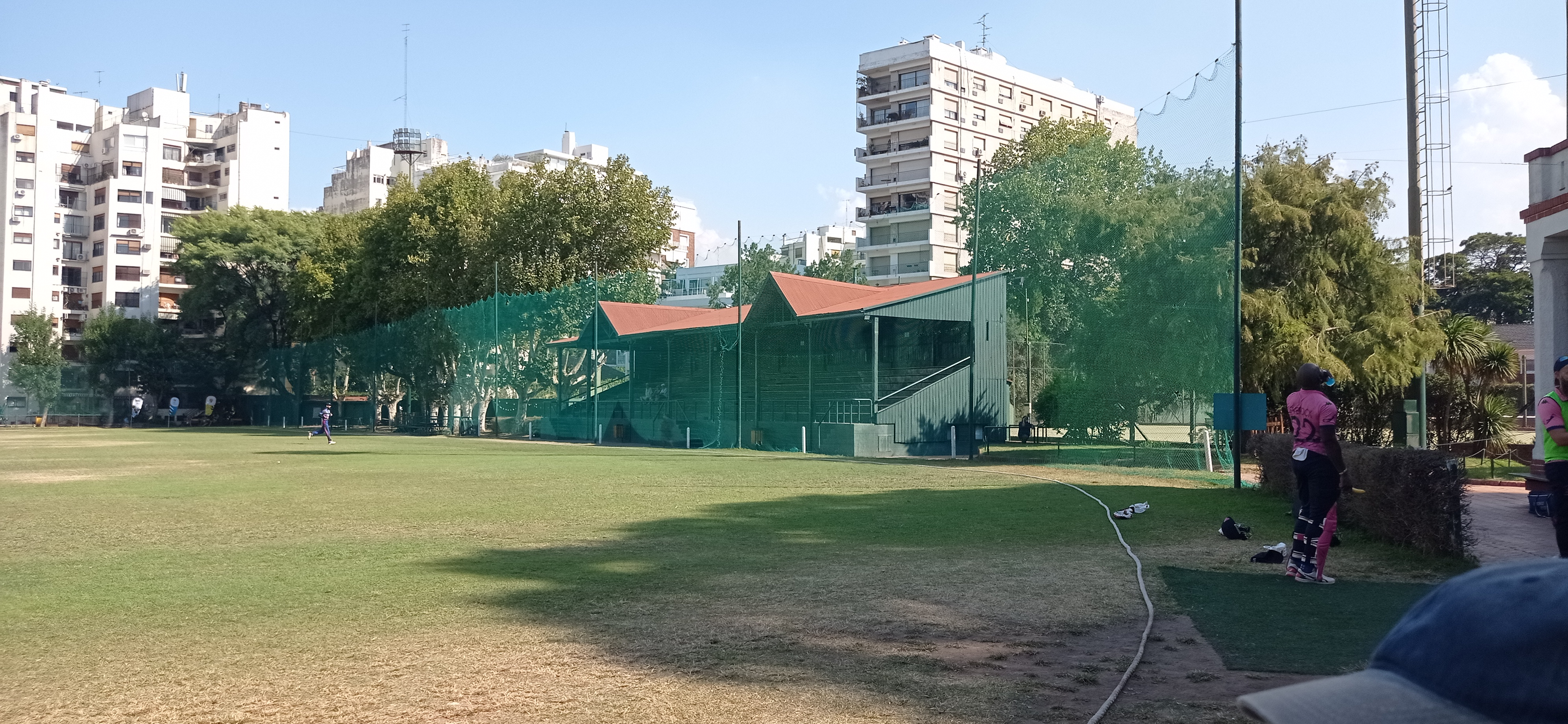
The Belgrano A.C. Field (here pictured in 2023) was the venue for the match

Alumni		Round	Estudiantes (BA)	
Opponent	Result	Stage	Opponent	Result
–	–	Round of 8	–	–
Rosario Central	6–0 (A)	Quarterfinal	Barracas A.C.	3–1 (H)
Argentino de Quilmes	2–1 (N)	Semifinal	Quilmes	3–2 (H)

== Match details ==
1906 Copa de Honor MCBA Final
9 September 1906

Alumni	3–1	Estudiantes (BA)
	Report

Estadio Belgrano Athletic, Buenos Aires

**Alumni**	**Estudiantes (BA)**
