= 1918 Copa de Honor MCBA Final =

1918 Copa de Honor Final
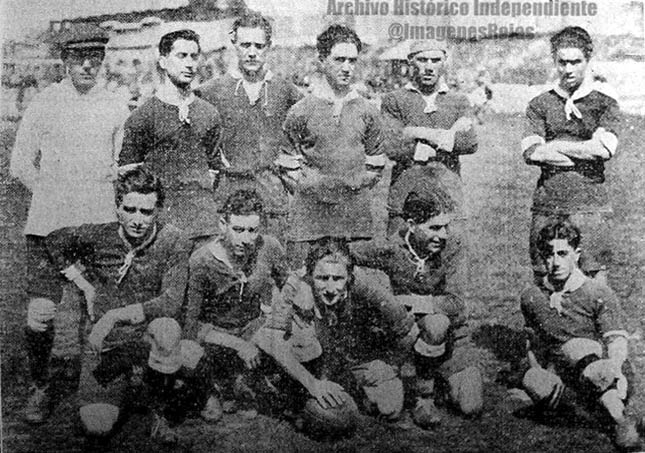
- Independiente, champions
- Event: 1918 Copa de Honor "Municipalidad de Buenos Aires"
Independiente	Platense
1	0
- Date: 1 November 1918
- Venue: Estadio GEBA, Buenos Aires

The 1918 Copa de Honor Municipalidad de Buenos Aires Final was a football match that decided the champion of the 13th. edition of this National cup of Argentina. In the match, held in Estadio GEBA (home of Gimnasia y Esgrima) in Buenos Aires, Independiente defeated Platense 1–0. winning its first (and only) Copa de Honor trophy.

== Qualified teams ==
Team	Previous final app.
Independiente	(none)
Platense	(none)

Note

- **Bold** indicates winning years

== Overview ==
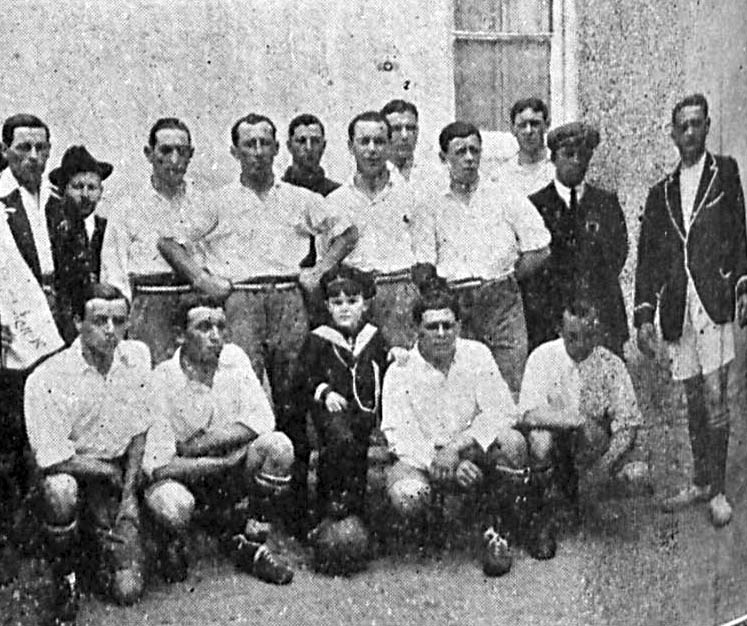
The Platense squad that beat Central Córdoba at Rosario

The 1918 edition was contested by 28 clubs, 20 within Buenos Aires Province, and 8 from Liga Rosarina de Football. Playing in a single-elimination tournament, Independiente eliminated Columbian (4–3 at Estadio Crucecita in playoff after both teams had tied 1–1 in Boca Juniors Stadium), then arch-rival Racing Club 2–1 at home, Boca Juniors 2–1 in semifinals at Porteño's field in Palermo (goals by Galeano and Soro).

On the other hand, Platense defeated Estudiantes (LP) at Estadio Jorge Luis Hirschi, then eliminated Sportivo Barracas 2–1 in extra time, Tigre 3–0, Gimnasia y Esgrima 20 (both matches at their home venue) and finally Central Córdoba 3–2 in a match held in Club Gimnasia y Esgrima de Rosario's venue in Parque Independencia.

The final was held in Estadio GEBA on 1 November 1918. Independiente defeated Platense 1–0, to win their Copa de Honor trophy.

== Road to the final ==
- H: home
- A: away
- N: neutral

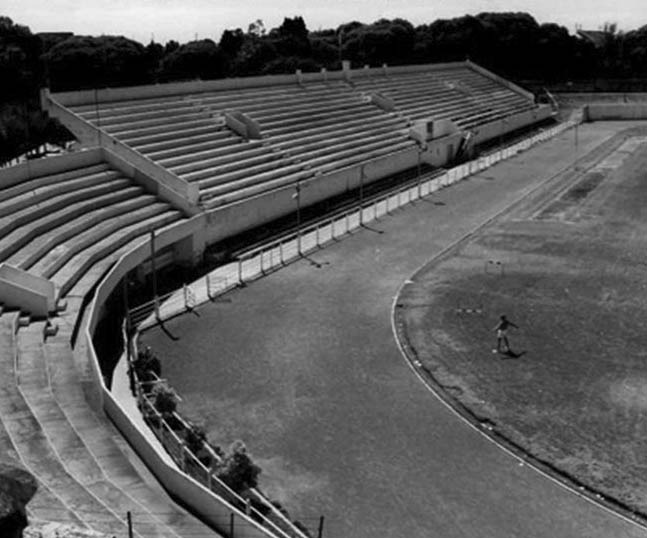
GEBA Stadium, venue of the final

Independiente		Round	Platense	
Opponent	Result	Stage	Opponent	Result
–	–	Preliminary round	Estudiantes (LP)	2–1 (A)
Columbian	1–1 (a.e.t.), 4–3 (N)	First Round	Sportivo Barracas	2–1 (a.e.t.) (H)
Racing Club	2–1 (H)	Second Round	Tigre	3–0 (H)
Boca Juniors	2–1 (a.e.t.) (N) (Note: Played at Club Atlético Porteño venue in Palermo.)	Semifinal (BA)	Gimnasia y Esgrima	2–0 (H)
–	–	Semifinal (Arg.)	Central Córdoba (R)	3–2 (N) (Note: Played at Club Gimnasia y Esgrima de Rosario venue in Parque Independencia.)

== Match details ==
1918 Copa de Honor MCBA Final
1 November 1918

Independiente	1–0	Platense
Galeano	Report

Estadio GEBA, Buenos Aires

**Independiente**	**Platense**

GK	(Argentina) Pedro Isusi
DF	(Argentina) Antonio Ferro
DF	(Argentina) Roberto Sande
MF	(Argentina) Juan Cánepa
MF	(Argentina) Ernesto Sande
MF	(Argentina) Massoco
FW	(Argentina) Pascual Garré
FW	(Argentina) Guillermo Ronzoni
FW	(Uruguay) Zoilo Canavery
FW	(Argentina) Vicente Soro
FW	(Argentina) Gualberto Galeano

GK
DF
DF
MF
MF
MF
FW
FW
FW
FW
FW
