= 1911 Copa de Honor MCBA Final =

1911 Copa de Honor Final
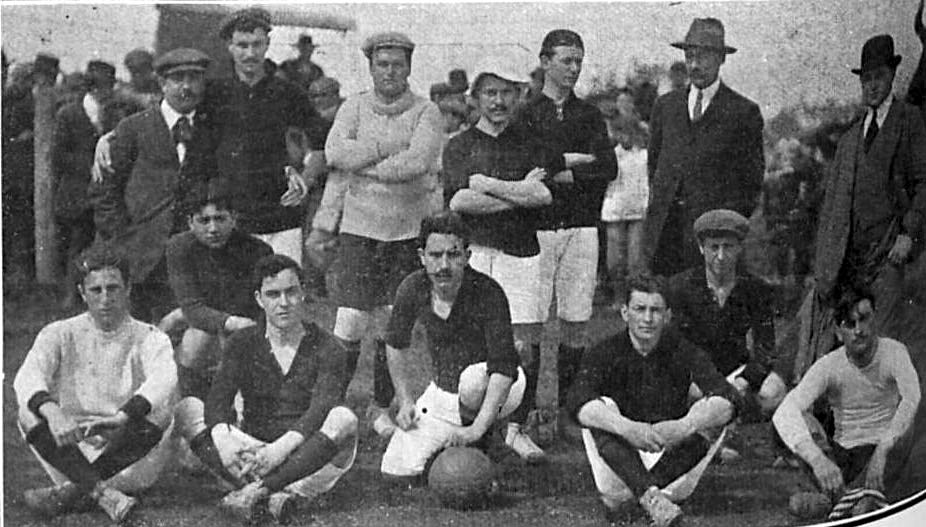
- Newell's Old Boys, champions
- Event: 1911 Copa de Honor "Municipalidad de Buenos Aires"
Porteño	Newell's Old Boys
2	3
- Date: 24 September 1911
- Venue: River Plate Stadium, La Boca, Buenos Aires
- Referee: T. Jordan

The 1911 Copa de Honor Municipalidad de Buenos Aires was the final that decided the champion of the 7th. edition of this National cup of Argentina. In the match, held in River Plate Stadium in Dársena Sur (La Boca) on September 24, 1911, Newell's Old Boys beat Club Atlético Porteño 3–2, winning not only the trophy but its first title in the Argentine top division.

== Qualified teams ==
Team	Previous final app.
Porteño	1908
Newell's Old Boys	(none)

Note

- **Bold** indicates winning years

== Overview ==
The 1911 edition was contested by 12 clubs, 7 within Buenos Aires Province and 5 from Liga Rosarina de Football participating in the competition. Playing in a Single-elimination tournament, Porteño beat Club Atlético Provincial (5–2), Gimnasia y Esgrima de Buenos Aires (4–2), qualifying for the final.

On the other hand, Newell's beat Rosario Central (2–1 at Plaza Jewell) and San Isidro 1–0 at its own venue.

The final was held in River Plate Stadium in La Boca on September 24, 1911, where Newell's won 3–2 with goal by Manuel González (2) and Hollamby, who scored on the last minute of the match.

== Road to the final ==
- H: home
- A: away

Porteño		Round	Newell's	
Opponent	Result	Stage	Opponent	Result
Provincial	5–2 (A)	First Round	Rosario Central	2–1 (A)
Gimnasia y Esgrima (BA)	4–2 (N) (Note: Played at Estadio de Independiente.)	Second Round	San Isidro	1–0 (H)

== Match details ==
1911 Copa de Honor MCBA Final
24 September 1911

Porteño	2–3	Newell's Old Boys
Debenedetti 22'; Marques 35'		M. González 14', 29'; Hollamby 90'

River Plate Stadium, Buenos Aires
Referee: T. Jordan

**Porteño**	**Newell's**

GK	(Argentina) Juan José Rithner
DF	(Argentina) Héctor Viboud
DF	(Argentina) J. Cucchi
MF	(Argentina) B. Berisso
MF	(Argentina) Domingo Bacigaluppi
MF	(Argentina) Dastugue
FW	(Argentina) Mario Genoud
FW	(Argentina) Anacarsis Galup Lanús
FW	(Argentina) Antonio Piaggio
FW	(Argentina) Antonio Marques
FW	(Argentina) F. Debenedetti

GK	(Argentina) José Hiriart
DF	(Argentina) Tomás Hamblin
DF	(Argentina) Rafael Bordabehere
MF	(Argentina) Martín Redín
MF	(Argentina) Caraciolo González
MF	(Argentina) Antonio Torelli
FW	(England) C.K. Hollamby
FW	(Argentina) Manuel González
FW	(Argentina) Faustino González
FW	(Argentina) Hugo Mallet
FW	(Argentina) José Viale
