= 1916 Copa de Honor MCBA Final =

1916 Copa de Honor Final
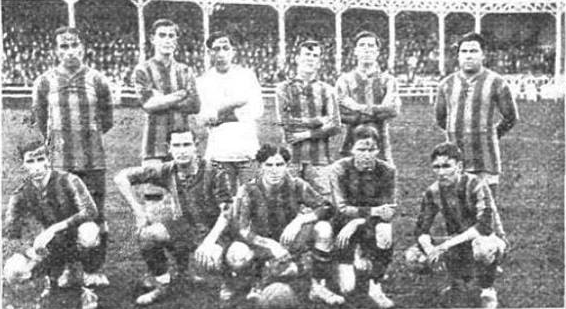
- A Rosario Central team of 1916
- Event: 1916 Copa de Honor "Municipalidad de Buenos Aires"
Independiente	Rosario Central
0	1
- Date: 12 November 1916
- Venue: Racing Stadium, Avellaneda
- Referee: Hugo Gondra
- Attendance: 6,000

The 1916 Copa de Honor Municipalidad de Buenos Aires was the final that decided the champion of the 11th edition of this National cup of Argentina. In the match, held in Racing Club Stadium on November 12, 1916, Rosario Central won its first Copa de Honor after beating Independiente 1–0.

That year was one of the most successful in the history of Rosario Central so the club won four titles, the Copa Nicasio Vila (first division of Rosarian Football League), the 1915 edition of Copa Ibarguren, Copa de Competencia Jockey Club, and the Copa de Honor.

== Qualified teams ==
Team	Previous final app.
Independiente	(none)
Rosario Central	(none)

Note

- **Bold** indicates winning years

== Overview ==
The 1916 edition was contested by 23 clubs, 21 within Buenos Aires Province (including Estudiantes and Gimnasia from La Plata) and 2 from Liga Rosarina de Football participating in the competition. Playing in a Single-elimination tournament, Independiente beat Gimnasia y Esgrima de Buenos Aires (3–1), Huracán (1–0), and Boca Juniors (1–0). In the semifinal, Independiente defeated Central Córdoba 2–1, qualifying for the final at Racing Club Stadium.

On the other side, Rosario Central thrashed arch-rival Newell's Old Boys 8–0 and then beat Gimnasia y Esgrima Rosario in the Rosarino zone, qualifying for the semifinal, where the squad easily defeated Argentino de Quilmes 7–0.

The final was held in Racing Club Stadium in Avellaneda on November 12, 1916, where Rosario Central won 1–0 with goal by Ennis Hayes on 36 minutes.

== Road to the final ==
- H: home
- A: away
- N: neutral

Independiente		Round	Rosario Central	
Opponent	Result	Stage	Opponent	Result
–		Preliminary	Newell's Old Boys	8–0 (H)
Gimnasia y Esgrima (BA)	3–1 (A)	First Round	Gimnasia y Esgrima (R)	4–1 (A)
Huracán	1–0 (A)	Second Round	– (Note: As the Rosario zone had less teams than the porteños, there were only two stages.)	
Boca Juniors	1–0 (H)	Third Round	–	
Central Córdoba (R)	2–1 (a.e.t.) (N) (Note: Played at Estadio Racing Club.)	Semifinal (Note: Played between porteños and rosarinos teams.)	Argentino de Quilmes	7–0 (H)

== Match details ==
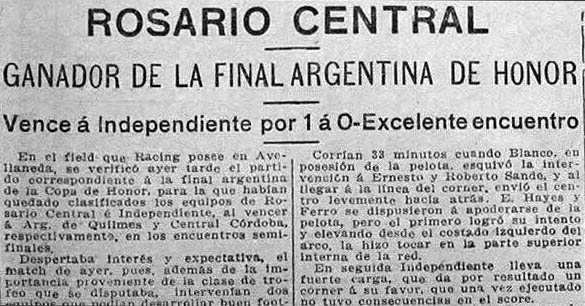
Chronicle of the match praising Rosario Central

1916 Copa de Honor MCBA Final
12 November 1916

Independiente	0–1	Rosario Central
		E. Hayes 36'

Estadio Racing Club, Avellaneda
Attendance: 6,000
Referee: Hugo Gondra

**Independiente**	**Rosario Central**

GK	(Argentina) Secundino Miguens
DF	(Argentina) Antonio Ferro
DF	(Argentina) Roberto Sande
MF	(Argentina) Juan Cánepa
MF	(Argentina) Ernesto Sande
MF	(Argentina) Ernesto Scoffano
FW	(Argentina) Pascual Garré
FW	(Argentina) Ernesto Strittmatter
FW	(Argentina) Alberto Cherro
FW	(Argentina) Aníbal Arroyuelo
FW	(Argentina) Gualberto Galeano

GK	(Argentina) Ramón Moyano
DF	(Argentina) Zenón Díaz
DF	(Argentina) Ignacio Rotta
MF	(Argentina) Ernesto Rigotti
MF	(Argentina) Ernesto Blanco
MF	(Argentina) Jacinto Perazzo
FW	(Argentina) Antonio Blanco
FW	(Argentina) José Laoilo
FW	(Argentina) Juan Enrique Hayes
FW	(Argentina) Ennis Hayes
FW	(Argentina) José Clarke
