= 1917 Copa de Honor MCBA Final =

1917 Copa de Honor Final
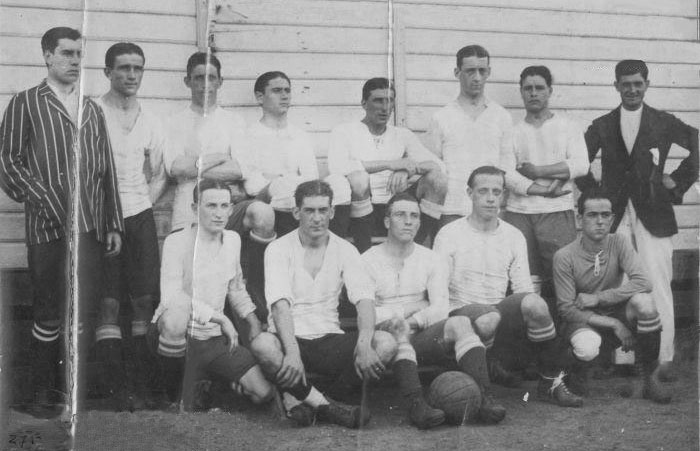
- A Racing team of 1917
- Event: 1917 Copa de Honor "Municipalidad de Buenos Aires"
Racing Club	River Plate
3	1
- (after extra time)
- Date: 6 January 1918
- Venue: Independiente Stadium, Avellaneda

The 1917 Copa de Honor Municipalidad de Buenos Aires was the final that decided the champion of the 12th. edition of this National cup of Argentina. In the match, held in Estadio Crucecita (home of C.A. Independiente) in Avellaneda, Racing Club beat River Plate 3–1 in extra time, winning its four Copa de Honor trophy within five years.

It was the 4th. and last Copa de Honor won by Racing, which also won all the finals contested.

== Qualified teams ==
Team	Previous final app.
Racing Club	**1912, 1913, 1915**
River Plate	(none)

Note

- **Bold** indicates winning years

== Overview ==
The 1918 edition was contested by 29 clubs, 21 within Buenos Aires Province, and 8 from Liga Rosarina de Football. Playing in a single-elimination tournament, Racing beat Banfield (3–0 in Avellaneda), Estudiantes de La Plata (2–0 as visitor), arch-rival Independiente (3–1 after extra time in Crucecita stadium). In the Buenos Aires' semifinal, Racing beat San Lorenzo de Almagro 3–1 at Dársena Sur, qualifying to play the semifinal vs the Rosario representatives that had played another elimination stage. In semifinal, Racing defeated Rosario Central (1–1 and 3–0 in Dársena Sur and Crucecita, respectively).

On the other hand, River Plate beat Estudiantil Porteño (3–0 at Gaona and Campichuelo), Porteño (2–0 in Dársena Sur), Tigre (5–0 as visitor), and finally Huracán (3–2 at Racing Club) qualifying for the semifinal vs the Rosarian team, where the squad beat Tiro Federal (1–1 and 1–0, at Gimnasia y Esgrima de Rosario and Dársena Sur, respectively).

The final was held in Independiente Stadium on January 6, 1918. Racing beat River 3–1 after extra time, winning its four and last Copa de Honor trophy.

== Road to the final ==
- H: home
- A: away
- N: neutral

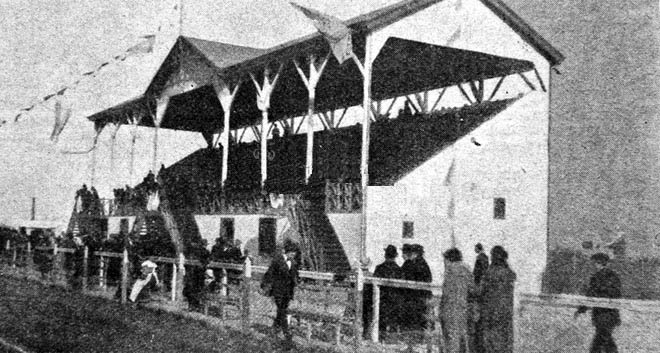
Independiente Stadium, venue of the final

Racing		Round	River Plate	
Opponent	Result	Stage	Opponent	Result
Banfield	3–0 (H)	Preliminary	Estudiantil Porteño	3–0 (N) (Note: Played at Ferro Carril Oeste Stadium.)
Estudiantes (LP)	2–0 (A)	First Round	Porteño	2–0 (H)
Independiente	3–1 (a.e.t.) (A)	Second Round	Tigre	5–0 (A)
San Lorenzo	3–1 (N) (Note: Played in La Boca (maybe Boca Juniors Stadium?).)	Third Round	Huracán	3–2 (N) (Note: Played in Avellaneda (it is unclear if Independiente or Racing venue).)
Rosario Central	1–1 (a.e.t.) (H); 3–0 (H)	Semifinal (Note: Played between porteños and rosarinos teams.)	Tiro Federal	1–1 (a.e.t.) (A); 1–0 (A)

== Match details ==
1917 Copa de Honor MCBA Final
6 January 1918

Racing Club	3–1 (a.e.t.)	River Plate
?	Report	?

Independiente Stadium, Avellaneda

**Racing**	**River Plate**
