= 1905 Copa de Honor MCBA Final =

1905 Copa de Honor Final
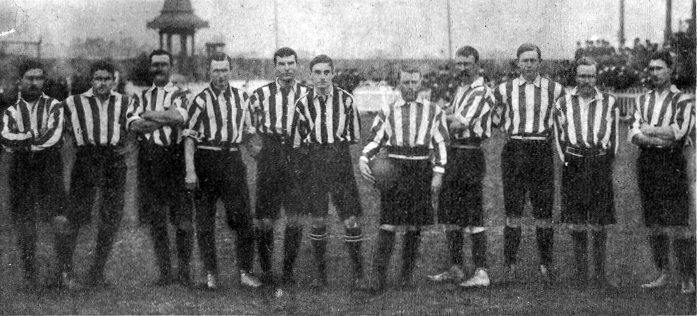
- An Alumni team of 1905
- Event: 1905 Copa de Honor "Municipalidad de Buenos Aires"
Alumni	Quilmes
1	0
- (a.e.t.)
- Date: 30 August 1905
- Venue: Sociedad Sportiva, Buenos Aires
- Referee: W.A. Jordan

The 1905 Copa de Honor Municipalidad de Buenos Aires was the final that decided the champion of the first edition of this National cup of Argentina. In the match, held in Sociedad Sportiva Argentina, Alumni defeated Quilmes 1–0 in extra time, becoming the first winner of this competition.

== Qualified teams ==
Team	Previous final app.
Alumni	(none)
Quilmes	(none)

Note

- **Bold** indicates winning years

== Overview ==
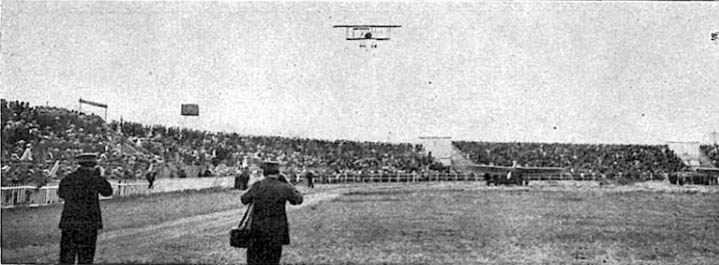
Sociedad Sportiva Argentina, venue

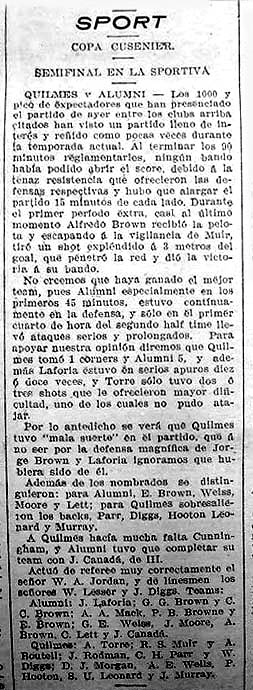
Chronicle of the final at La Argentina newspaper

The 1905 edition was contested by 8 clubs, 7 within Buenos Aires Province and 1 from Liga Rosarina de Football participating in the competition. Playing in a single-elimination tournament, Alumni defeated Estudiantes (BA) (4–1) and Belgrano Athletic Club (3–1), qualifying for the final.

On the other hand, Quilmes thrahsed Lomas 9–0, then eliminating Rosario Central 2–0 on extra time.

The final was held in Sociedad Sportiva Argentina (the main sports venue of that time and considered a predecessor of the Argentine Olympic Committee) on 30 August 1905, where Alumni won 1–0 with a goal by Alfredo Brown in extra time.

Chronicles of the match (which had an attendance of only 1,000 spectators) indicated that Quilmes had deserved best luck. Newspaper La Argentina even stated: "we don't think the best one won (the match)", and praised the performance of Alumni's goalkeeper, José Buruca Laforia.

== Road to the final ==
- H: home
- A: away

Alumni		Round	Quilmes	
Opponent	Result	Stage	Opponent	Result
Estudiantes (BA)	4–1 (A)	First Round	Lomas	9–0 (H)
Belgrano A.C.	3–1 (N)	Semifinal	Rosario Central	2–0 (a.e.t.) (H)

== Match details ==
1905 Copa de Honor MCBA Final
30 August 1905

Alumni	1–0 (a.e.t.)	Quilmes
Alfredo Brown 105'	Report

Sociedad Sportiva, Buenos Aires
Attendance: 1,000
Referee: W.A. Jordan

**Alumni**	**Quilmes**

GK	(Argentina) José Buruca Laforia
DF	(Argentina) Jorge Brown
DF	(Argentina) Carlos C. Brown
MF	(Argentina) Andrés Mack
MF	(Argentina) Patricio Browne
MF	(Argentina) Ernesto Brown
FW	(Argentina) Gottlob E. Weiss
FW	(Argentina) Juan J. Moore
FW	(Argentina) Alfredo Brown
FW	(Argentina) Carlos Lett
FW	(Argentina) J. Canadá

GK	A. Thorne
DF	R.S. Muir
DF	A. Boutell
MF	J. Rodman
MF	Charles H. Parr
MF	W. Diggs
FW	David J. Morgan
FW	Arthur E. Wells
FW	Percy Hooton
FW	Spencer Leonard
FW	John Murray
