= Natalio Perinetti =

Argentine footballer

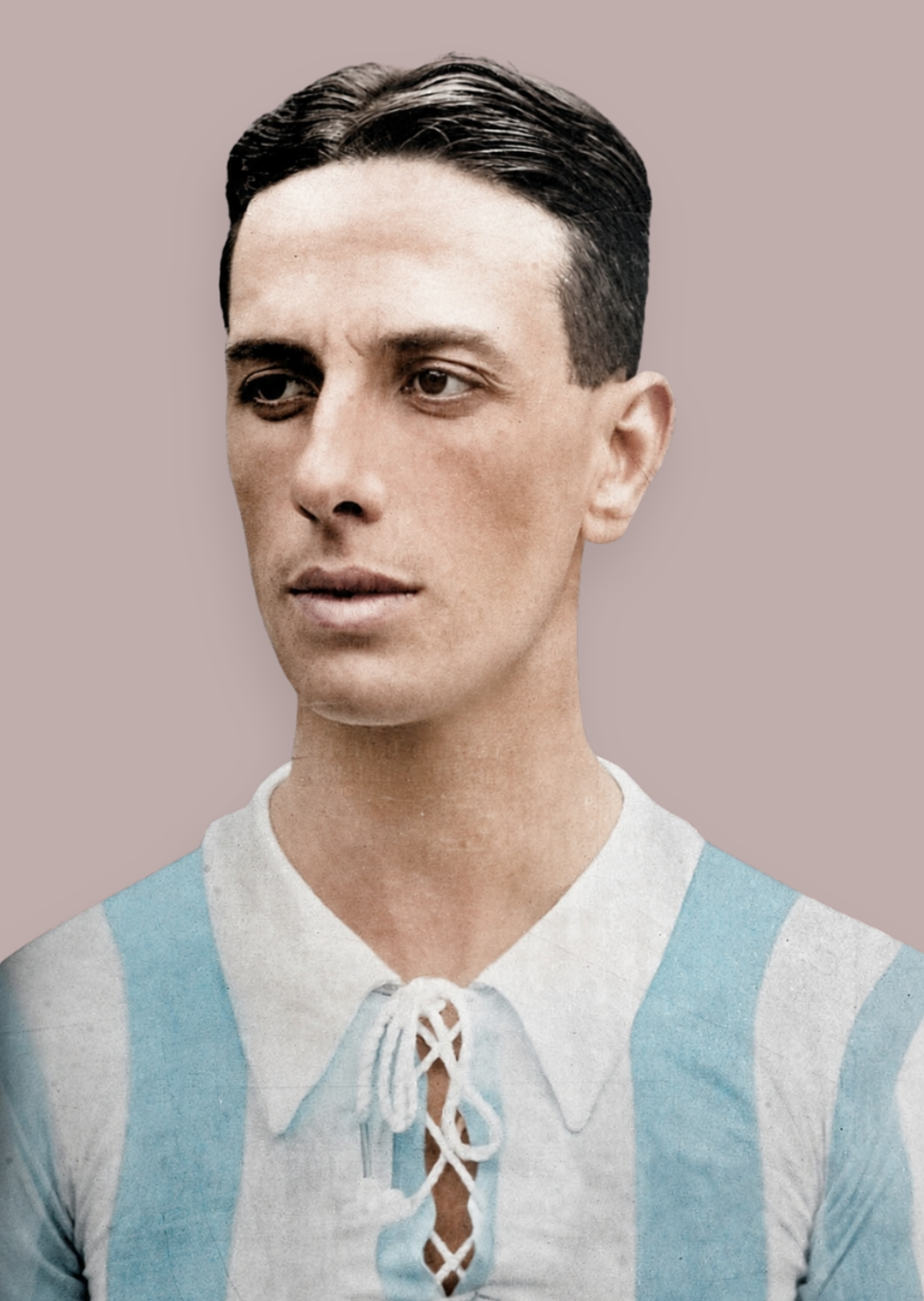
- Perinetti on the cover of El Gráfico in 1926

Personal information
- Date of birth: 28 December 1900
- Place of birth: Buenos Aires, Argentina
- Date of death: 24 May 1985 (aged 84)
- Position: Right winger

Youth career
- 1913–1915: Talleres (BA)

Senior career*
Years	Team	Apps	(Gls)
1917–1933	Racing Club	83	(11)
1934	River Plate	10	(3)
Total		93	(14)

International career
1929–1930	Argentina	6	(0)
Medal record
Men's Football
Representing Argentina
Copa América
Winner	1929 Argentina	Team
FIFA World Cup
Runner-up	1930 Uruguay	Team
- * Club domestic league appearances and goals

Natalio Perinetti (28 December 1900 – 24 May 1985) was an Argentine footballer that spent most of his career in Racing Club, playing for 17 years and winning 12 titles with the club. A skilled right winger, Perinetti is regarded as one of the greatest idols of the club, being a key player of the team that earned the nickname Academia in the 1910s.

== Biography ==
Perinetti started playing football matches with his friends in the district of Barracas, his birthplace. Due to his skills with the ball, he was encouraged to try registering with a club with the hope of developing a career in football.

His first club was Talleres (BA) where he played with the youth teams. At only 14 years old, Perinetti came to Racing in 1915, after being recommended by his older brother Juan. He started at the fourth division playing as right winger. It was during those years when he met Pedro Ochoa (other skilled player who would be later nicknamed the king of the dribbling), who became Perinetti's partner inside the field and best friend in life.

Perinetti debuted with the senior team two years later. He soon noted as a key player for Racing, being praised and recognised for his speed and control of the ball. He played 17 consecutive years in Racing, winning 12 titles with the club (10 domestic and 2 international). During his brilliant career in Racing, then president of Real Madrid, Santiago Bernabéu, tried to convince him to play for the club, but he refused the offer because of his love for Racing.

When Spanish club Real Madrid played v Racing during their tour on the Americas in 1927, Perinetti made a stunning performance which particularly impressed rival player Santiago Bernabéu, who wanted to hired Perinetti for his team, although the Argentine declined the offer.

Perinetti was part of the Argentina national football team where he played 7 games between 1923 and 1930, including the first FIFA World Cup held in Uruguay in 1930. He also played the 1929 South American Championship (current Copa América) with the national squad. He was part of Argentina's squad for the 1928 Summer Olympics, but he did not play in any matches.

In June 1934, Perinetti left Racing for River Plate. He made his debut in a 2–0 win over Club de Gimnasia y Esgrima La Plata. After retirement, Perinetti was a sports commentator on television in the 60s.

== Honours ==
Racing Club

- Primera División (5): 1917, 1918, 1919, 1921, 1925
- Copa de Honor Municipalidad de Buenos Aires (1): 1917
- Copa Ibarguren (2): 1916, 1917
- Copa Beccar Varela (1): 1932
- Copa de Competencia (LAF) (1): 1933
- Copa Aldao (2): 1917, 1918

Argentina

- Copa América: 1929
- Summer Olympics Silver Medal: 1928
- FIFA World Cup runner-up: 1930
