= 1912 Copa de Honor MCBA Final =

1912 Copa de Honor Final
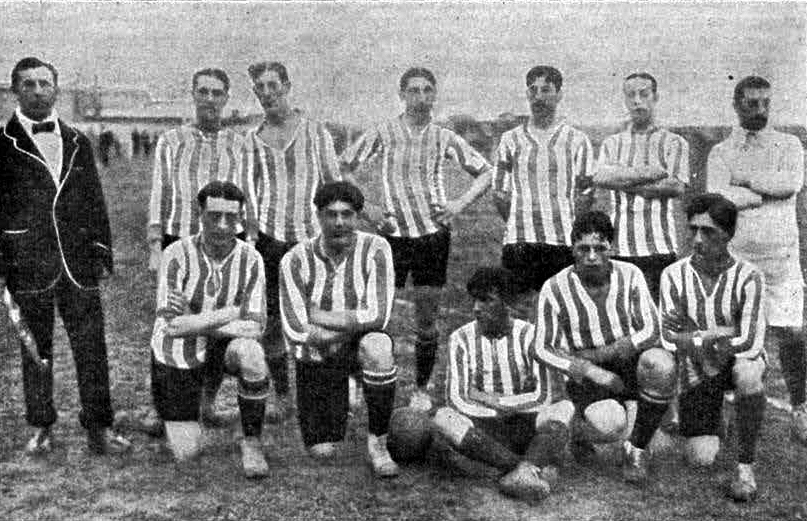
- A Racing team of 1912
- Event: 1912 Copa de Honor "Municipalidad de Buenos Aires"
Racing Club	Newell's Old Boys
3	0
- Venue: Racing Stadium, Avellaneda

The 1912 Copa de Honor Municipalidad de Buenos Aires was the final that decided the champion of the 8th. edition of this National cup of Argentina. In the match, held in Racing Club Stadium in Avellaneda, Racing Club beat reigning champion Newell's Old Boys 3–0, winning its first title in the top division of Argentine football.

The 1912 Copa de Honor was the first of a large list of national cups and Primera División titles won by Racing Club during the 1910s decade that earned the club its most famous nickname, La Academia.

== Qualified teams ==
Team	Previous final app.
Racing Club	(none)
Newell's Old Boys	**1911**

Note

- **Bold** indicates winning years

== Overview ==
The 1912 edition was contested by 10 clubs, 5 within Buenos Aires Province and 5 from Liga Rosarina de Football participating in the competition. Playing in a single-elimination tournament, Racing beat River Plate (3–0 in Dársena Sur), Estudiantes (BA) (5–0 in Avellaneda), and Club Atlético Provincial (6–1 in Rosario) to reach the final.

On the other side, Newell's beat Rosario Central (5–3), and achieved another easy win against C.A. Argentino (7–0) paving its road to the final in Avellaneda.

The final was held in Estadio Racing Club in 1912, where Racing beat Newell's won 3–0, with goals by Alberto Ohaco (2) and Alberto Marcovecchio.

== Road to the final ==
- H: home
- A: away

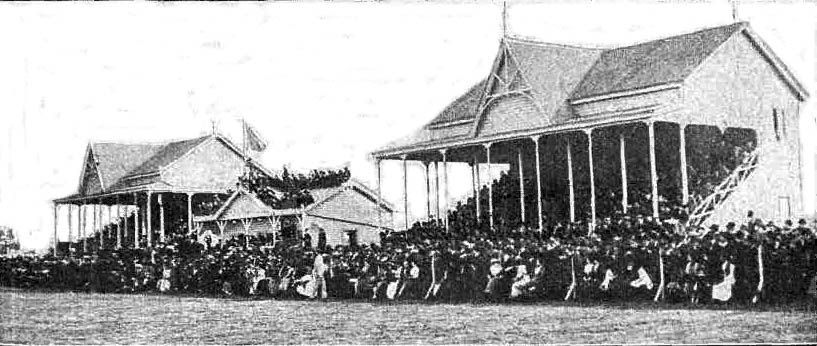
Racing Club Stadium, venue of the final

Racing		Round	Newell's	
Opponent	Result	Stage	Opponent	Result
River Plate	3–0 (A)	Preliminary	Rosario Central	5–3 (A)
Estudiantes BA	5–0 (H)	First Round	Argentino (R) (Note: Not to be confused with Argentino de Rosario.)	7–0 (H)
Provincial	6–1 (A)	Second Round	–	

== Match details ==
1912 Copa de Honor MCBA Final
(unknown date), 1912

Racing Club	3–0	Newell's Old Boys
Ohaco; Marcovecchio	Report

Racing Stadium, Avellaneda

**Racing**	**Newell's**
