= 1913 Copa de Honor MCBA Final =

1913 Copa de Honor Final
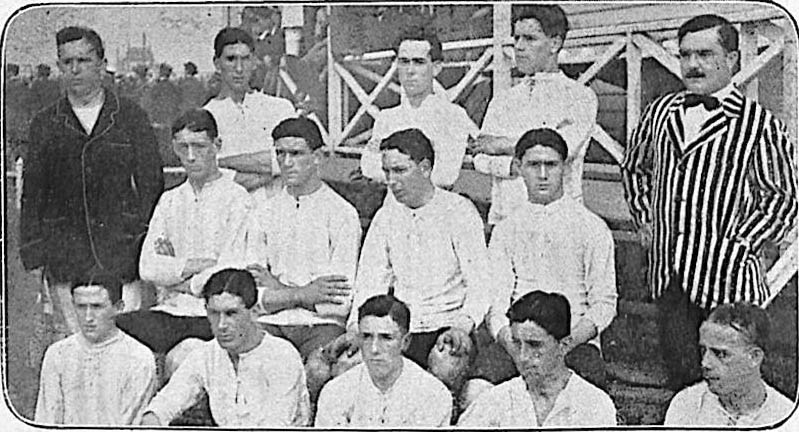
- A Racing team of 1913
- Event: 1913 Copa de Honor "Municipalidad de Buenos Aires"
Racing Club	Estudiantes (BA)
5	1
- Date: 9 November 1913
- Venue: Ferro C. Oeste, Buenos Aires

The 1913 Copa de Honor Municipalidad de Buenos Aires was the final that decided the champion of the 9th. edition of this National cup of Argentina. In the match, held in Ferro C. Oeste Stadium in Caballito, Buenos Aires, Racing Club beat Club Atlético Estudiantes 5–1, winning its second consecutive Copa de Honor trophy. On the other hand, it was the third and last Copa de Honor final played by Estudiantes, with no success.

== Qualified teams ==
Team	Previous final app.
Racing Club	**1912**
C.A. Estudiantes	1906, 1909

Note

- **Bold** indicates winning years

== Overview ==
The 1918 edition was contested by 18 clubs, 13 within Buenos Aires Province, and 5 from Santa Fe Province (4 from Liga Rosarina de Football, and one from the city of Santa Fe). Playing in a single-elimination tournament, Racing beat Ferrocarril Sud (6–1), Estudiantil Porteño (4–0 in Avellaneda), and Club Atlético San Isidro (2–0 in the semifinal, also in Avellaneda).

On the other side, Estudiantes beat C.A. Riachuelo (3–0 in Barracas), River Plate (4–2 in Dársena Sur), Belgrano A.C. (unknown score, at its own field in Palermo), and Boca Juniors (5–4 in extra time, at San Isidro). The final was held in Ferro C. Oeste Stadium on November 9, 1913. Racing beat Estudiantes 5–1, also winning its second consecutive Copa de Honor title.

== Road to the final ==
- H: home
- A: away
- N: neutral

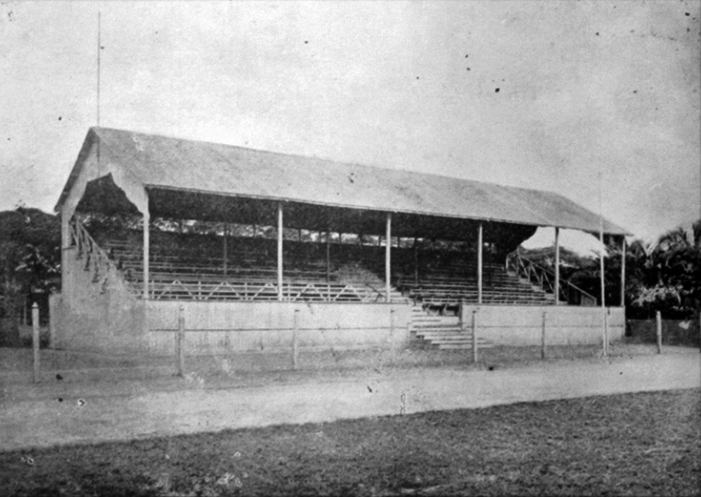
Ferro C. Oeste Stadium, venue

Racing		Round	Estudiantes (BA)	
Opponent	|Result	Stage	Opponent	Result
Ferrocarril Sud	6–1 (A)	Round of 8	River Plate	4–2 (A)
Estudiantil Porteño	4–0 (H)	Quarter final	Belgrano A.C.	wp–lp (H) (Note: Won on points after Belgrano did not attend the match.)
San Isidro	2–0 (H)	Semifinal	Boca Juniors	5–4 (N) (Note: Played at San Isidro.)

== Match details ==
1913 Copa Honor MCBA Final
9 November 1913

Racing Club	5–1	Estudiantes (BA)
?	Report	?

Ferro C. Oeste, Buenos Aires

**Racing**	**Estudiantes BA**
