= 1914 Argentine Primera División =

23rd season of top-tier football league in Argentina

Primera División
- Season: 1914
- Dates: 29 March – 29 November
- Champions: Racing (AFA); Porteño (FAF)

The 1914 Argentine Primera División was the 23rd season of top-flight football in Argentina. Racing won the official AFA tournament, while Porteño won the dissident FAF championship, the last tournament before both leagues, AFA and FAF reunified.

The AFA season began on Marzo 29 and ended on December? while the FAF season began on April 5 and ended on December?.

== Final tables ==
=== Asociación Argentina de Football – Copa Campeonato ===
Primera División (AFA)
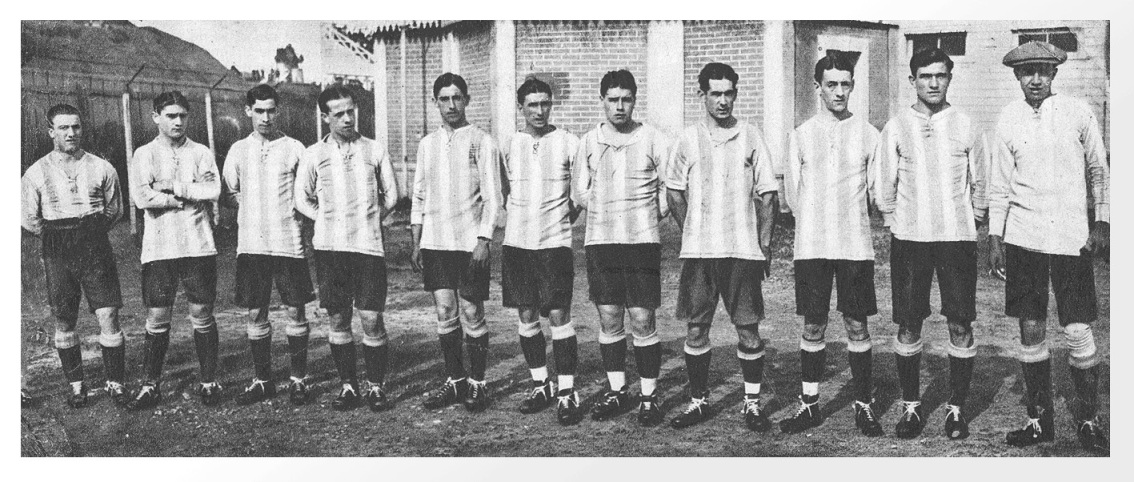
- Racing, AFA champions
- Season: 1914
- Dates: 29 March – 8 November
- Champions: Racing (2nd title)
- Promoted: Huracán
- Relegated: (none)
- Top goalscorer: (Argentina) Alberto Ohaco (Racing) (20 goals)
- Biggest home win: Boca Juniors 7–0 Quilmes
- Biggest away win: Comercio 1–10 Huracán

Huracán made its debut in Primera División, while Ferrocarril Sud was dissolved after playing 7 matches.

| Pos | Team | Pld | W | D | L | GF | GA | GD | Pts |
|---|---|---|---|---|---|---|---|---|---|
| 1 | Racing (C) | 12 | 11 | 1 | 0 | 42 | 7 | +35 | 23 |
| 2 | Estudiantes (BA) | 12 | 10 | 1 | 1 | 34 | 12 | +22 | 21 |
| 3 | Boca Juniors | 12 | 5 | 5 | 2 | 19 | 11 | +8 | 15 |
| 4 | Banfield | 12 | 7 | 1 | 4 | 16 | 17 | −1 | 15 |
| 5 | River Plate | 12 | 6 | 2 | 4 | 15 | 12 | +3 | 14 |
| 6 | Huracán | 12 | 4 | 3 | 5 | 25 | 22 | +3 | 11 |
| 7 | Platense | 12 | 4 | 2 | 6 | 14 | 17 | −3 | 10 |
| 8 | San Isidro | 12 | 2 | 6 | 4 | 10 | 16 | −6 | 10 |
| 9 | Estudiantil Porteño | 12 | 3 | 4 | 5 | 14 | 23 | −9 | 10 |
| 10 | Quilmes | 12 | 4 | 2 | 6 | 14 | 24 | −10 | 10 |
| 11 | Belgrano AC | 12 | 1 | 6 | 5 | 14 | 20 | −6 | 8 |
| 12 | Ferro Carril Oeste | 12 | 2 | 2 | 8 | 17 | 30 | −13 | 6 |
| 13 | Comercio | 12 | 0 | 3 | 9 | 13 | 36 | −23 | 3 |

(C) Champions

=== Federación Argentina de Football ===
Primera División (FAF)
- Season: 1914
- Dates: 5 April – 29 November
- Champions: Porteño (2nd title)
- Promoted: Floresta
- Relegated: (none)
- Top goalscorer: (Argentina) Ernesto Colla (Independiente) (12 goals)
- Biggest home win: Argentino (Q) 8–0 Tigre
- Biggest away win: Atlanta 1–7 Independiente; Kimberley 1–7 Porteño

Tigre was ejected from the Federation after playing 14 matches while Argentino de Quilmes was disaffiliated after playing 7 games. According to the rules, Floresta had to be relegated but it finally remained in Primera due to the reunification of both leagues Asociación Argentina and Federación Argentina.

| Pos | Team | Pld | W | D | L | GF | GA | GD | Pts |
|---|---|---|---|---|---|---|---|---|---|
| 1 | Porteño (C) | 14 | 10 | 4 | 0 | 46 | 18 | +28 | 24 |
| 2 | Estudiantes (LP) | 14 | 9 | 3 | 2 | 31 | 16 | +15 | 21 |
| 3 | Independiente | 14 | 7 | 5 | 2 | 27 | 16 | +11 | 19 |
| 4 | Kimberley | 14 | 5 | 2 | 7 | 21 | 39 | −18 | 12 |
| 5 | Gimnasia y Esgrima (BA) | 14 | 4 | 3 | 7 | 19 | 20 | −1 | 11 |
| 6 | Hispano Argentino | 14 | 4 | 3 | 7 | 25 | 29 | −4 | 11 |
| 7 | Atlanta | 14 | 4 | 2 | 8 | 21 | 33 | −12 | 10 |
| 8 | Floresta | 14 | 1 | 2 | 11 | 11 | 33 | −22 | 4 |

(C) Champions
