= 1913 Argentine Primera División =

22nd season of top-tier football league in Argentina

Primera División
- Season: 1913
- Dates: 13 April – 28 December
- Champions: Racing Club (AFA); Estudiantes (LP) (FAF)
- 1913 Copa Aldao: Racing

The 1913 Argentine Primera División was the 22nd season of top-flight football in Argentina. Racing won the official AFA tournament also achieving its first title in Primera División, while Estudiantes (LP) won the FAF title.

The AFA season began on April 13 and ended on December (?) while the FAF season began on May 1 and ended on December 21.

== Asociación Argentina de Football – Copa Campeonato ==
Primera División (AFA)
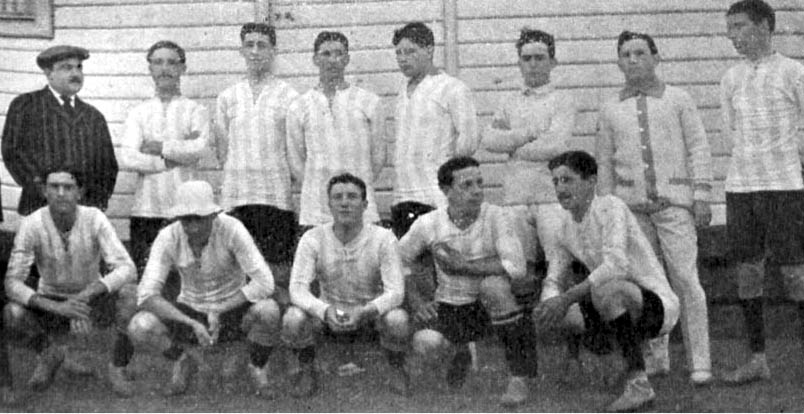
- Racing, AFA champion
- Season: 1913
- Dates: 13 April – 28 December
- Champions: Racing (1st title)
- Promoted: Ferro C. Oeste (Note: Not directly promoted by the Association but the Intermedia champion in 1912.); Banfield; Boca Juniors; Comercio; Estudiantil Porteño; Ferrocarril Sud; Olivos; Platense; Riachuelo
- Relegated: Olivos; Riachuelo
- Top goalscorer: (Argentina) Alberto Ohaco (20 goals)

The number of teams was considerably increased (from 6 to 15), adding Ferro Carril Oeste (promoted as División Intermedia champion) and directly promoting Banfield, Boca Juniors, Comercio, Estudiantil Porteño, Ferrocarril Sud, Olivos, Platense and Riachuelo. Olivos and Riachuelo were relegated at the end of the season.

Pos	Team	Pld	W	D	L	GF	GA	GD	Pts
1	Racing	14	12	0	2	41	5	+36	24
2	San Isidro	14	11	2	1	44	8	+36	24
3	River Plate	14	10	4	0	30	7	+23	24
4	Belgrano AC	14	8	2	4	34	16	+18	18
5	Boca Juniors	14	8	2	4	29	16	+13	18
6	Platense	14	8	2	4	36	25	+11	18
7	Quilmes	14	8	2	4	29	21	+8	18
8	Estudiantes (BA)	14	6	1	7	26	23	+3	13
9	Estudiantil Porteño	14	5	3	6	32	33	−1	13
10	Banfield	14	5	3	6	23	31	−8	13
11	Comercio	14	4	2	8	26	34	−8	10
12	Ferro Carril Oeste	14	1	4	9	16	31	−15	6
13	Ferrocarril Sud	14	1	2	11	17	51	−34	4
14	Olivos (R)	14	1	2	11	10	49	−39	4
15	Riachuelo (R)	14	0	3	11	8	51	−43	3

(R) Relegated

=== Final playoff ===
Date	Team 1	Res.	Team 2	Venue	City
28 Dec	Racing	2–0	San Isidro	? (Note: Sources indicates Palermo, Buenos Aires but it is unclear which venue they refer, it could be the field of C.A. Porteño in that district.)	Buenos Aires

== Federación Argentina de Football ==
Hispano Argentino and Tigre joined the league.

Primera División (FAF)
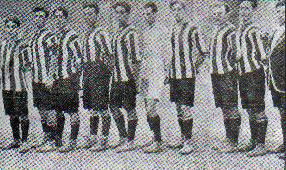
- Estudiantes, FAF champion
- Season: 1913
- Dates: 1 May – 21 December
- Champions: Estudiantes (LP) (1st title)
- Promoted: Estudiantes (LP)
- Relegated: (none)
- Top goalscorer: (Argentina) Guillermo Dannaher (16 goals)

Pos	Team	Pld	W	D	L	GF	GA	GD	Pts
1	Estudiantes (LP) (C)	18	14	3	1	64	16	+48	31
2	Gimnasia y Esgrima (BA)	18	11	6	1	49	19	+30	28
3	Argentino (Q)	18	12	3	3	38	21	+17	27
4	Kimberley	18	9	3	6	34	31	+3	21
5	Independiente	18	7	5	6	39	33	+6	19
6	Hispano Argentino	18	8	1	9	21	40	−19	17
7	Tigre	18	6	3	9	23	38	−15	15
8	Porteño	18	4	4	10	26	32	−6	12
9	Atlanta	18	3	2	13	33	57	−24	8
10	Sociedad Sportiva Argentina	18	0	2	16	15	52	−37	2

(C) Champions
