= 1916 Argentine Primera División =

25th season of top-tier football league in Argentina

Primera División
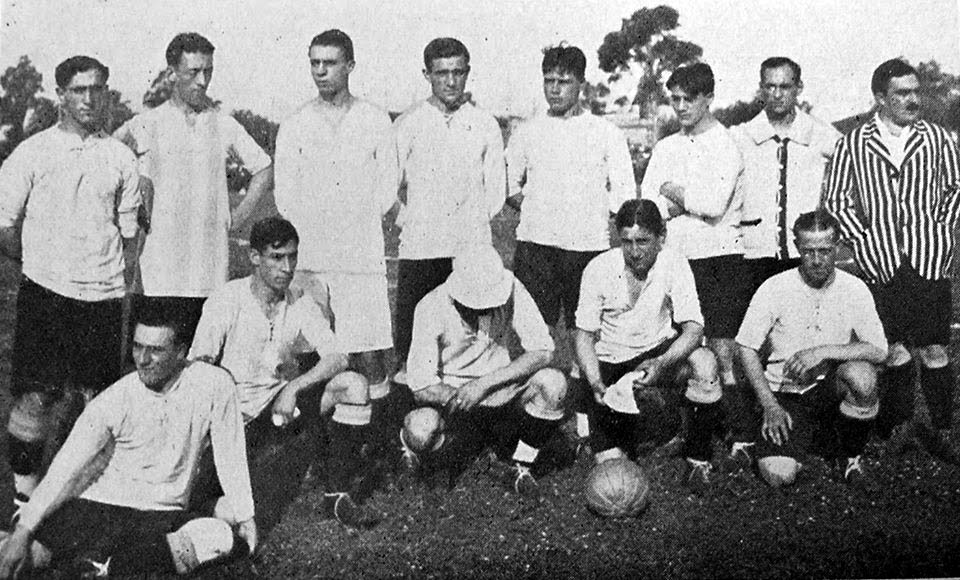
- Racing Club, champions
- Season: 1916
- Champions: Racing (4th title)
- Promoted: Gim. y Esg. (LP)
- Relegated: Belgrano AC; Quilmes
- 1916 Copa Aldao: Racing
- Top goalscorer: (Argentina) Marius Hiller (16 goals)

The 1916 Argentine Primera División was the 25th season of top-flight football in Argentina. The season began on March 23 and ended on December.

Racing win its 4th consecutive league championship.

== Final standings ==
Pos	Team	Pld	W	D	L	GF	GA	GD	Pts
1	Racing (C)	21	15	4	2	39	10	+29	34
2	Platense	21	12	6	3	25	13	+12	30
3	River Plate	21	10	9	2	27	10	+17	29
4	Gimnasia y Esgrima (LP)	21	9	9	3	21	12	+9	27
5	Huracán	21	11	4	6	31	16	+15	26
6	Estudiantil Porteño	21	10	6	5	37	22	+15	26
7	San Lorenzo	21	9	5	7	16	25	−9	23
8	Porteño	21	7	8	6	32	26	+6	22
9	Gimnasia y Esgrima (BA)	21	8	5	8	31	29	+2	21
10	Tigre	21	8	5	8	22	28	−6	21
11	Argentino (Q)	21	7	6	8	25	23	+2	20
12	Estudiantes (LP)	21	6	8	7	26	26	0	20
13	San Isidro	21	7	6	8	29	32	−3	20
14	Boca Juniors	21	7	6	8	25	29	−4	20
15	Independiente	21	6	8	7	13	17	−4	20
16	Columbian (Note: "Hispano Argentino" changed its name to "Columbian".)	21	6	7	8	24	26	−2	19
17	Atlanta	21	5	7	9	17	24	−7	17
18	Banfield	21	4	8	9	20	31	−11	16
19	Estudiantes (BA)	21	5	5	11	27	33	−6	15
20	Ferro Carril Oeste	21	6	3	12	28	39	−11	15
21	Belgrano AC (R)	21	5	3	13	20	40	−20	13
22	Quilmes (R)	21	2	4	15	12	36	−24	8

(C) Champions; (R) Relegated
