= Copa de Honor Municipalidad de Buenos Aires =

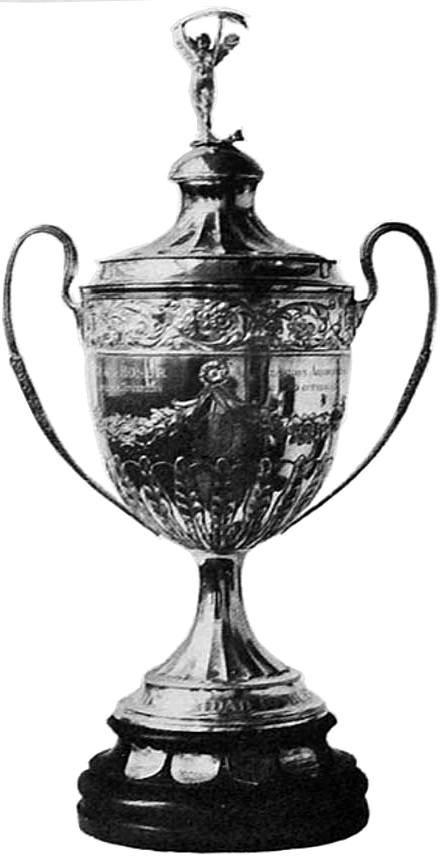
- The trophy awarded to champions
- Organiser(s): AFA
- Founded: 1905
- Abolished: 1920; 106 years ago
- Region: Argentina
- Teams: 16 (last edition)
- Qualifier for: Copa de Honor Cousenier
- Related competitions: Copa de Honor (Uru)
- Last champions: Banfield (1920)
- Most championships: Racing (4 titles)

The Copa de Honor Municipalidad de la Ciudad de Buenos Aires (Municipality of Buenos Aires Honour Cup) was an Argentine official football cup competition. It was contested fourteen times between 1905 and 1920.

The cup was played as a single-elimination tournament, being contested by 8 tems in its first edition, up to 16 in its last season (1920).

Racing is the most winning team of the competition, with 4 titles.

== Overview ==
This cup was played by teams from Buenos Aires and Rosario (which belonged to Liga Rosarina de Football). The champion of this tournament qualified to play the Copa de Honor Cousenier versus the winner of Uruguayan Copa de Honor representing the Association of that country.

In 1936, a new "Copa de Honor" was played under a regular Primera División season, with 18 teams playing a single-round tournament. San Lorenzo finished 1st and was awarded the cup. In July 2013, the Argentine Football Association recognized the 1936 edition as a Primera División honour awarded to the club.

== List of champions ==
=== Finals ===
The following list includes all the editions of the Copa de Honor:

Key

- (1) – Title number
- a.e.t. – Match went to extra time

Ed.	Year	Champion	Score	Runner-up	Venue	City
1	1905	Alumni (1)	1–0 (a.e.t.)	Quilmes	Sociedad Sportiva	Buenos Aires
2	1906	Alumni (2)	3–1	Estudiantes (BA)	Belgrano A.C.	Buenos Aires
3	1907	Belgrano AC (1)	3–1	Quilmes	Quilmes A.C.	Quilmes
4	1908	Quilmes (1)	2–1	Porteño	Quilmes A.C.	Quilmes
5	1909	San Isidro (1)	8–1	Estudiantes (BA)	GEBA	Buenos Aires
6	1910	(abandoned on quarter-finals) (Note: Team qualified for semifinals were Estudiantes (BA), Gimnasia y Egrima (BA), Tiro Federal, and River Plate.)				
7	1911	Newell's Old Boys (1)	3–2	Porteño	River Plate (Note: Dársena Sud field.)	Buenos Aires
8	1912	Racing (1)	3–0	Newell's Old Boys	Racing	Avellaneda
9	1913	Racing (2)	5–1	Estudiantes (BA)	Ferro C. Oeste	Buenos Aires
10	1915	Racing (3)	2–1	Tiro Federal	Racing	Avellaneda
11	1916	Rosario Central (1)	1–0	Independiente	Racing	Avellaneda
12	1917	Racing (4)	3–1 (a.e.t.)	River Plate	Independiente	Avellaneda
13	1918	Independiente (1)	1–0	Platense	GEBA	Buenos Aires
14	1920	Banfield (1)	2–1	Boca Juniors	Sportivo Barracas	Buenos Aires

=== Titles by team ===
Rank	Team	Titles	Years won
1	Racing	4	1912, 1913, 1915, 1917
2	Alumni	2	1905, 1906
3	Belgrano A.C.	1	1907
3	Quilmes	1	1908
3	San Isidro	1	1909
3	Newell's Old Boys	1	1911
3	Rosario Central	1	1916
3	Independiente	1	1918
3	Banfield	1	1920

=== Topscorers by season ===
Year	Player	Goals	Club
1905	Arthur Wells	5	Quilmes
1906	Alfredo Brown	5	Alumni
1907	Charles Whaley	6	Belgrano AC
1908	Juan Rossi	6	San Isidro
1908	Henry Cunningham	6	Quilmes
1909	Maximiliano Susan	6	Estudiantes (BA)
1910	Eduardo Rothschild	3	Gimnasia y Esgrima (BA)
1910	Thomas Hughes	3	Quilmes
1910	Juan O. Gil	3	San Isidro
1911	Antonio Márquez	4	Porteño
1912	Alberto Ohaco	6	Racing
1912	Alberto Marcovecchio	6	Racing
1913	Alberto Marcovecchio	7	Racing
1915	Carlos Guidi	7	Tiro Federal
1916	Ennis Hayes	7	Rosario Central
1917	Alberto Marcovecchio	11	Racing
1918	Gualberto Galeano	4	Independiente
1918	Atilio Badalani	4	Newell's Old Boys
1920	Pedro Calomino	5	Boca Juniors

== See also ==
- Copa de Honor Cousenier
- Copa de Honor (Uruguay)
