= 1944 Copa Ibarguren =

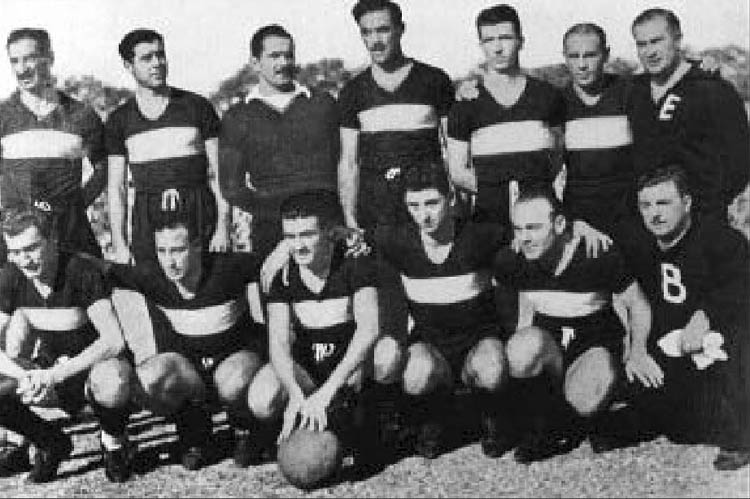
- A Boca Juniors team of 1947
Fed. Tucumana	Boca Juniors
0	6
- Date: March 23, 1947; 77 years ago
- Venue: Atlético Tucumán, Tucumán
- Referee: Eduardo Forte

The 1944 Copa Ibarguren was the 20th. edition of this National cup of Argentina. It was played by the champions of Primera División and the winner of Copa Presidente de la Nación, a regional cup competition where Provincial Federations took part. crowned during 1944.

Boca Juniors (Primera División champion) faced Federación Tucumana de Fútbol (Copa Presidente champion) at Atlético Tucumán Stadium, located in San Miguel de Tucumán. Although both teams had won their titles in 1944, the final was played three years later, on March 23, 1947.

== Qualified teams ==
Team	Qualification	Previous appearances
Boca Juniors	1944 Primera División champion	**1919**, 1920, **1923, 1924, 1940**
Federación Tucumana	1944 Copa Presidente de la Nación champion	(none)

- **Bold** indicates winning years

== Match details ==
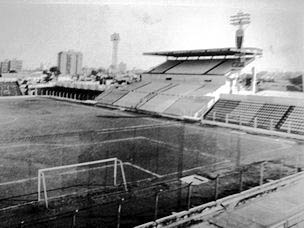
Atlético Tucumán Stadium, venue

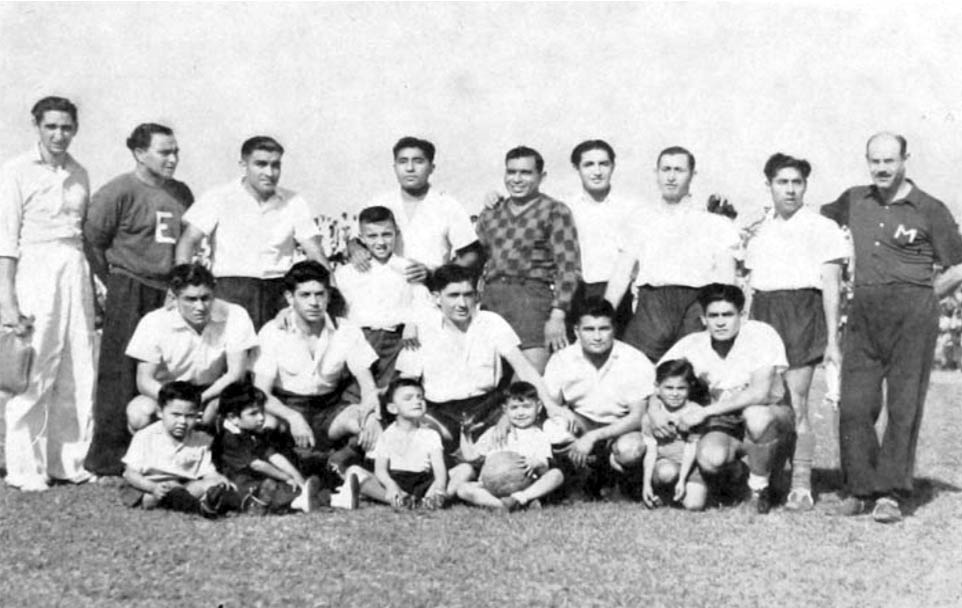
Team of Federación Tucumana

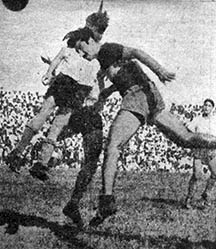
A moment of the match

1944 Copa Ibarguren
23 Mar 1947

Federación Tucumana	0–6	Boca Juniors
	Report	Sarlanga 13'; Ricagni 32', 46', 50'; Sosa 55'; Corcuera 64'

Atlético Tucumán Stadium
Referee: Eduardo Forte

**Federación Tucumana**	**Boca Juniors**

GK	Rodríguez
DF	Ángel Alderete
DF	Jofre
MF	Pereyra
MF	José Bello
MF	Mariano Coman
FW	Eduardo Borque
FW	Perdigon
FW	Martin
FW	Antonio Díaz
FW	Rotger
Manager:
?

GK	(Argentina) Claudio Vacca
DF	(Argentina) Aurelio Melogno
DF	(Argentina) José Marante
MF	(Argentina) Arcadio López
MF	(Argentina) Ernesto Lazzatti
MF	(Spain) Pedro Arico Suárez
FW	(Argentina) Domingo Gelpi
FW	(Argentina) Luis Carniglia
FW	(Argentina) Jaime Sarlanga
FW	(Argentina) Bernardo Gandulla
FW	(Argentina) Julio Rosell
Manager:
(Argentina) Eduardo González Pinto
