= 1952 Copa Ibarguren =

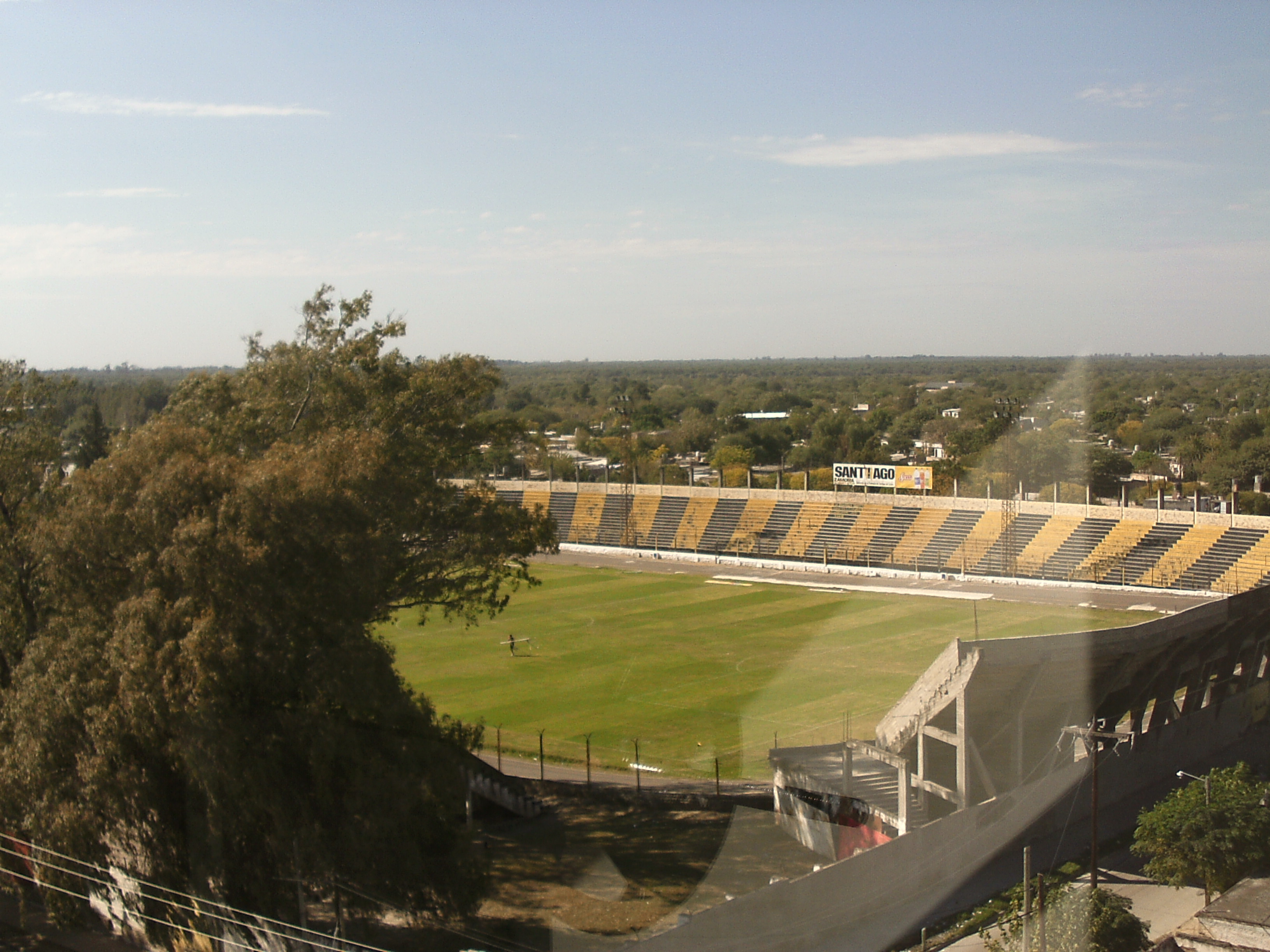
- C.A. Mitre Stadium, venue
- Event: Copa Ibarguren
Liga Cultural (SdE)	River Plate
1	1
- (after extra time). Both teams were declared champions
- Date: 9 July 1954
- Venue: C.A. Mitre Stadium, Santiago del Estero
- Referee: Alfredo Rossi

The 1952 Copa Ibarguren was the 22nd edition of this national cup of Argentina. The final was contested by Racing Club de Avellaneda (1952 Primera División champion), and Liga Cultural of Santiago del Estero Province (today "Liga Santiagueña"), champion of 1952 Copa Presidente de la Nación.

The match was held in C.A. Mitre Stadium on 9 July 1954 (almost two years both teams won their respective editions due to organizational problems), and ended 1–1 after extra time). As a playoff was never held, both teams were crowned champions of the competition.

== Qualified teams ==
Team	Qualification	Previous app.
River Plate	1952 Primera División champion	**1937, 1941, 1942**
Liga Cultural (Frías)	1952 Copa Presidente de la Nación champion	(None)

- **Bold** indicates winning years

== Overview ==
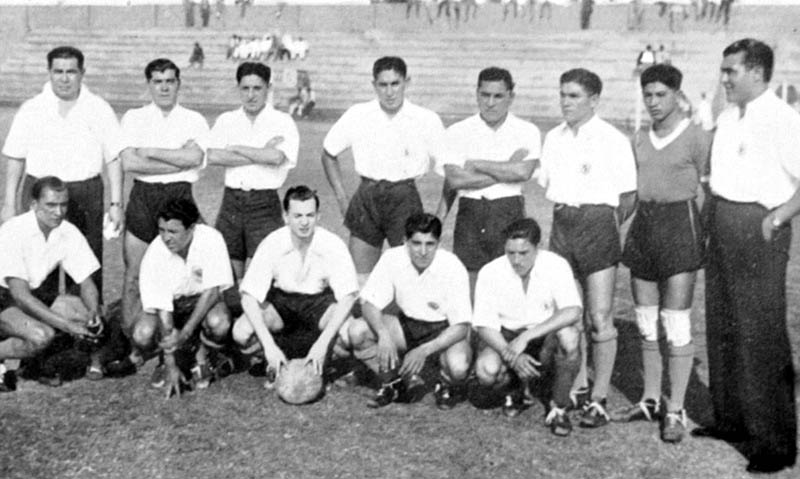
Liga Cultural, regional champions in 1952

The Liga Cultural had won the Copa de la República in December 1952 after defeating Liga de Pergamino (from the homonymous partido of Buenos Aires Province) 2–1 in the final held at C.A. Belgrano Stadium in Córdoba. achieving their second Campeonato de la República title.

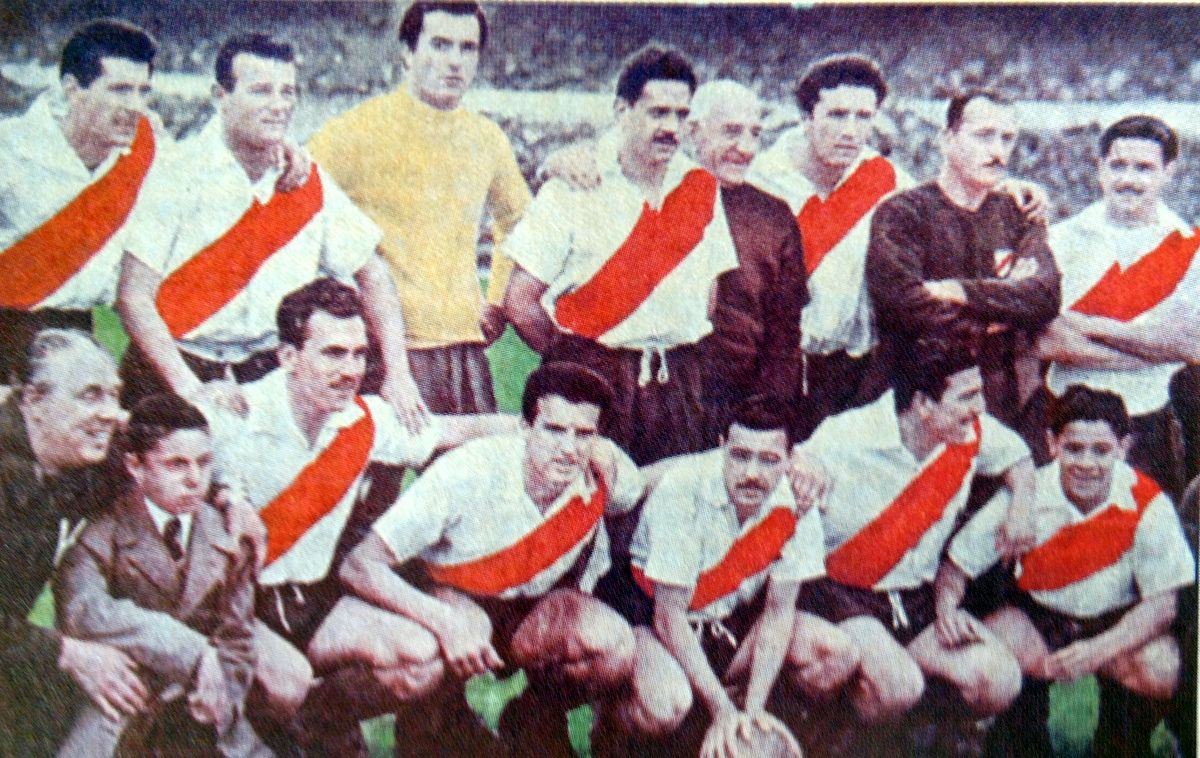
A River Plate team of 1954

On the other hand, River Plate, coached by José María Minella, had won the Primera División title in 1952 with 40 points in 30 matches played. Some players that had been part of legendary team La Máquina (such as Ángel Labruna, and Félix Loustau) were still part of the squad. Uruguayan striker Walter Gómez (who was in River since 1945) had consolidated as a keyplayer in the offensive line along with Labruna and Loustau.

== Match details ==
1952 Copa Ibarguren
9 July 1954

Liga Cultural	1–1 (a.e.t.)	River Plate
Loto 60'	Report	Gómez 4'

C.A. Mitre Stadium, Santiago del Estero
Referee: Alfredo Rossi

**Liga Cultural**	**River Plate**

GK	(Argentina) Díaz
DF	(Argentina) Lorenzo
DF	(Argentina) Elía
MF	(Argentina) Pereyra
MF	(Argentina) González
MF	(Argentina) Esper
FW	(Argentina) Cevallos
FW	(Argentina) Loto
FW	(Argentina) Zavaleta
FW	(Argentina) Comán
FW	(Argentina) Luna
Manager:
(Argentina) ?

GK	(Argentina) Pascual Adessio
DF	(Argentina) Alfredo Pérez
DF	(Argentina) Carlos B. Guastavino
MF	(Argentina) Roberto Tesouro
MF	(Argentina) Julio Venini
MF	(Argentina) Lidoro Soria
FW	(Argentina) Félix Respuela
FW	(Argentina) Eliseo Prado
FW	(Uruguay) Walter Gómez
FW	(Argentina) Ángel Labruna
FW	(Argentina) Félix Loustau
Manager:
(Argentina) José María Minella
