= 1925 Copa Ibarguren =

- Team of Huracán, champions
Huracán	Tiro Federal
2	1
- Date: September 19, 1926; 100 years ago
- Venue: Estadio Jorge Newbery, Buenos Aires
- Referee: T. Tenconi

The 1925 Copa Ibarguren was the 13th. edition of this National cup of Argentina. It was played by the champions of both leagues, Primera División and Liga Rosarina de Football crowned during 1925.

Huracán (Primera División champions) faced Tiro Federal (Copa Nicasio Vila champion) in a match held in Huracán's venue, Estadio Jorge Newbery (home venue of Huracán) on 19 September 1925, on September 19, 1926.

It was the third Copa Ibarguren final contested by Huracán while Tiro Federal played their second final after their victory over Boca Juniors in 1922.

Huracán defeated Tiro Federal (which played their second final) with goals by Guillermo Stábile and Juan Pratto to win their second Ibarguren trophy.

== Qualified teams ==
Team	Qualification	Previous app.
Huracán	1925 Primera División champion	1921, **1922**
Tiro Federal	1925 Copa Nicasio Vila champion	**1920**

Note

- **Bold** indicates winning years

== Venue ==
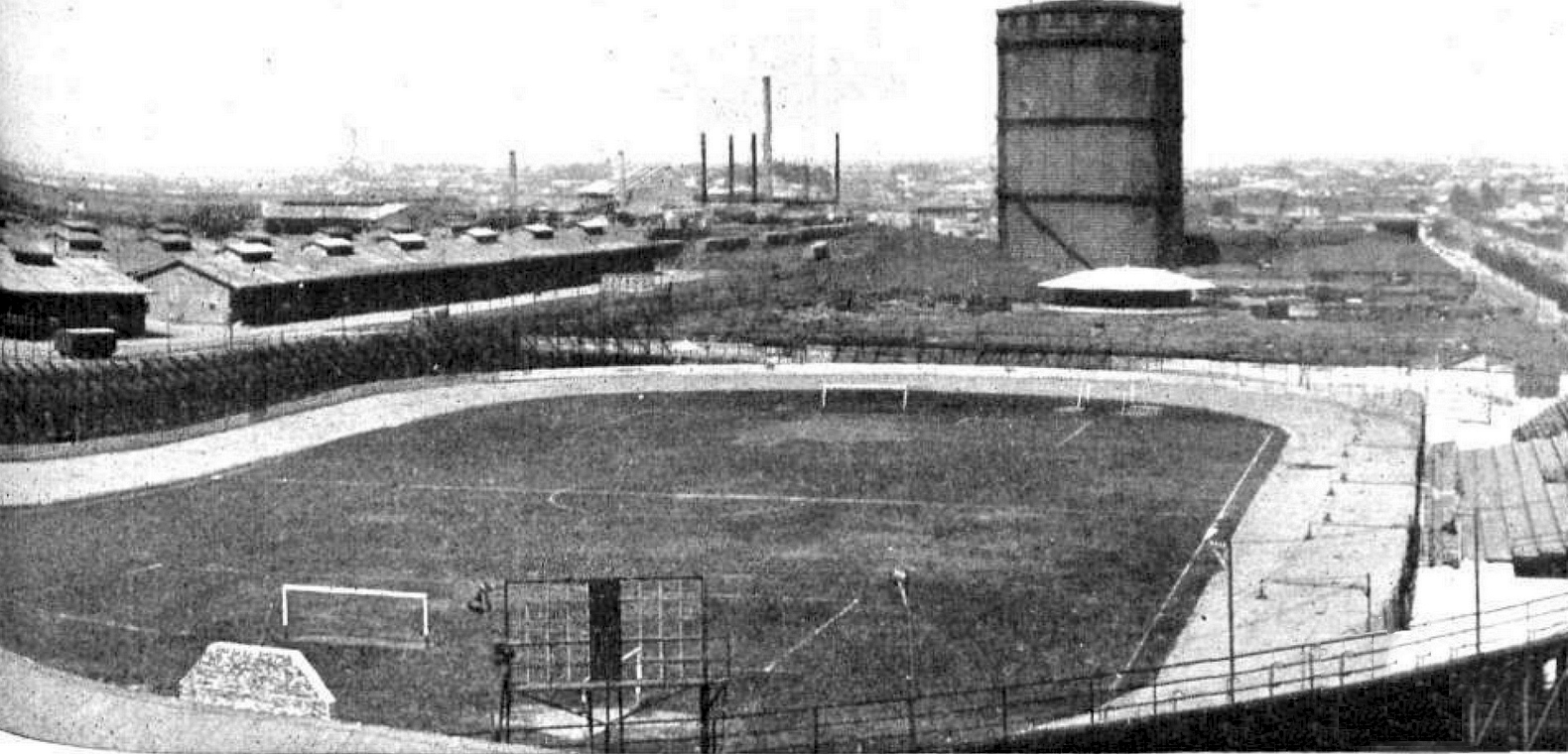
Estadio Jorge Newbery, venue

The match was held in the former Huracán stadium located on Avenida Amancio Alcorta and Luna in the neighborhood of Parque Patricios, Buenos Aires. The venue had been inaugurated in 1924 and named after aviation pioneer Jorge Newbery. The club had taken the silouette of Newbery's Huracán baloon to become its logo in 1911 (after an approval from Newbery himself, who would later become honorary member of the club). The stadium, made of wood stands, was located very close to la quema (a landfill in southern Buenos Aires), which originated the quemeros nickname to the club

By late 1930s the stadium was becoming obsolete so in 1939 the club acquired a 24,738 m2 land to build a new stadium The Jorge Newbery stadium was then demolished to build the Estadio Tomás Adolfo Ducó, a modern structure with concrete stands inaugurated in 1947, and home venue of C.A. Huracán since then.

== Match details ==
Tiro Federal team (left), and some moments of the match held in Estadio Huracán
1925 Copa Ibarguren
19 September 1926

Huracán	2–1	Tiro Federal
Stábile 8'; Pratto 30'	Report	López 60'

Estadio Jorge Newbery, Buenos Aires
Referee: T. Tenconi

**Huracán**	**Tiro Federal**

GK	(Argentina) Armando Cereseto
DF	(Italy) Carlos Nóbile
DF	(Argentina) Juan Pratto
MF	(Argentina) Pablo Bartolucci
MF	(Argentina) Alejandro Giglio
MF	(Argentina) Horacio Souza
FW	(Argentina) Adán Loizo
FW	(Argentina) Ángel Chiessa
FW	(Argentina) Guillermo Stábile
FW	(Argentina) Mario Fortunato
FW	(Argentina) Cesáreo Onzari

GK	(Argentina) Colombo
DF	(Argentina) J. Cochrane
DF	(Argentina) Roberto Cochrane
MF	(Argentina) Mendoza
MF	(Argentina) Victorio Faggiani
MF	(Argentina) Romano
FW	(Argentina) Pagliarusso
FW	(Argentina) Cattáneo
FW	(Argentina) Miguel
FW	(Argentina) Bussolini
FW	(Argentina) López
