= 1940 Copa Ibarguren =

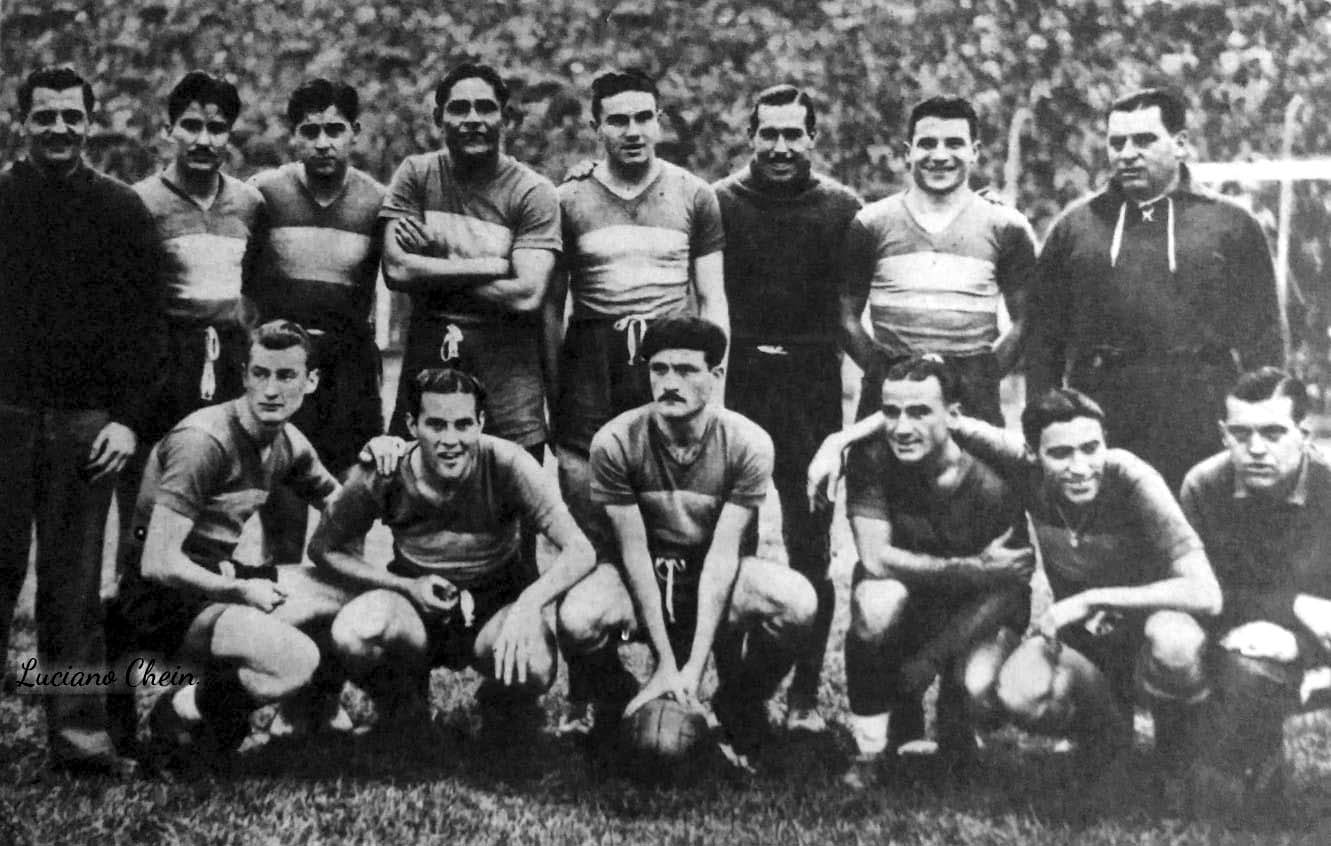
- A Boca Juniors team of 1941
Boca Juniors	Rosario Central
5	1
- Date: January 4, 1941; 85 years ago
- Venue: Chacarita Juniors, Buenos Aires
- Referee: Rafael Carou

The 1940 Copa Ibarguren was the 17° edition of this National cup of Argentina. It was played by the champions of both leagues, Primera División and Asociación Rosarina de Fútbol (successor of Liga Rosarina de Football, folded in 1930) crowned during 1940.

Boca Juniors (Primera División champion) faced Rosario Central (Asociación Rosarina champion) at Chacarita Juniors Stadium located in the Villa Crespo district of Buenos Aires. The match was played on January 4, 1941. As the senior squad of Rosario Central was playing the Primera División championships since 1939, the club fielded a reserve team for the occasion.

== Qualified teams ==
Team	Qualification	Previous app.
Boca Juniors	1940 Primera División champion	**1919**, 1920, **1923, 1924**
Rosario Central	1940 Asociación Rosarina champion	**1915**, 1916, 1917, 1919, 1923, 1937, 1938

- **Bold** indicates winning years

== Match details ==
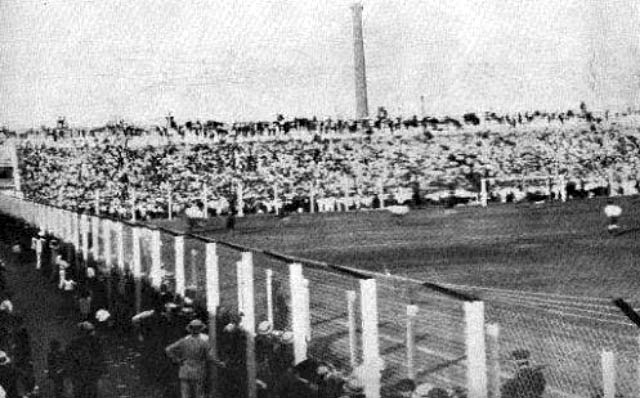
Chacarita Stadium, venue

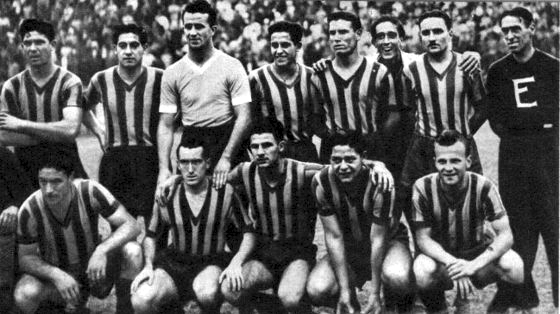
A Rosario Central team of 1941

1940 Copa Ibarguren
4 January 1941

Boca Juniors	5–1	Rosario Central
Carniglia 23'; Gelpi 38'; Marante 48'; Sarlanga 82'; Rosell 87'	Report	H. Hayes (s) 75'

Chacarita Juniors, Buenos Aires
Referee: Rafael Carou

**Boca Juniors**	**Rosario Central**

GK	(Argentina) Claudio Vacca
DF	(Argentina) Segundo Ibáñez
DF	(Argentina) José Marante
MF	(Argentina) Arcadio López
MF	(Argentina) Ernesto Lazzatti
MF	(Spain) Pedro Arico Suárez
FW	(Argentina) Domingo Gelpi
FW	(Argentina) Luis Carniglia
FW	(Argentina) Jaime Sarlanga
FW	(Argentina) Bernardo Gandulla
FW	(Argentina) Julio Rosell
Manager:
(Argentina) Enrique Sobral

GK	(Argentina) Pedro Araiz
DF	(Argentina) Pedro Perucca
DF	(Argentina) Clemente Verga
MF	(Argentina) Hernán R. López
MF	(Argentina) Constancio Rivero
MF	(Argentina) Adolfo Santiago
FW	(Argentina) Francisco Rodríguez
FW	(Argentina) Ricardo Cisterna
FW	(Argentina) Harry Hayes (son)
FW	(Argentina) Ángel De Cicco
FW	(Argentina) Carlos G. Armendariz
Manager:
(Argentina) Enrique Palomini
