= 1958 Copa Ibarguren =

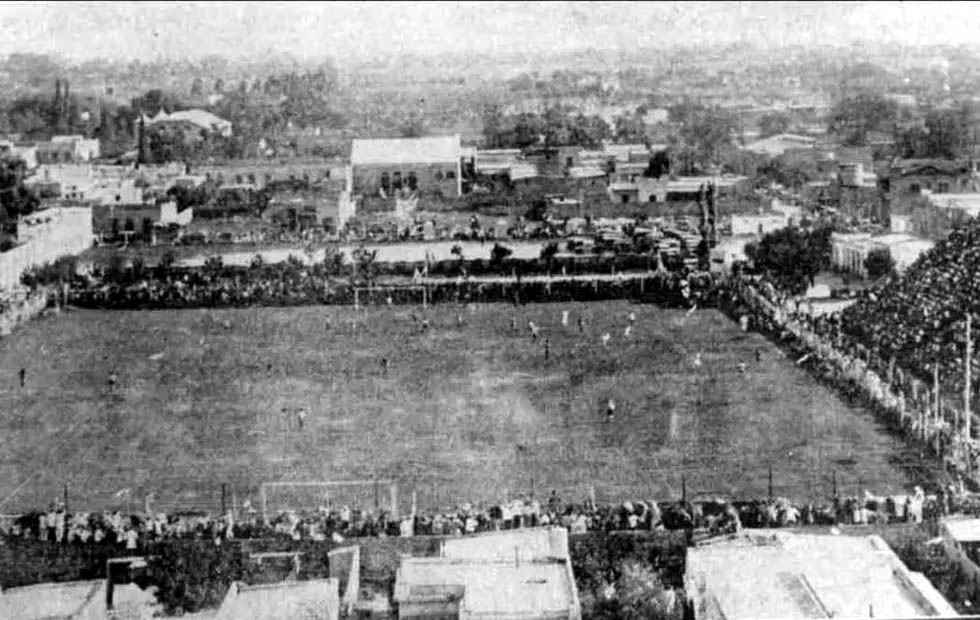
- C.A. Belgrano Stadium, venue
- Event: Copa Ibarguren
Liga Cordobesa	Racing
4	3
- Date: 13 March 1960
- Venue: C.A. Belgrano Stadium, Córdoba
- Referee: Desiderio Fernández

The 1958 Copa Ibarguren was the 23nd (and last) edition of this national cup of Argentina. The final was contested by Racing Club de Avellaneda (1958 Primera División champion), and Liga Cordobesa de Fútbol of Córdoba Province, champion of 1952 Copa Presidente de la Nación.

The match was held in C.A. Belgrano Stadium on 13 March 1960 (almost two years both teams won their respective editions due to organizational problems), with the Cordobese combined winning their first Ibarguren Cup after beating Racing 4–3.

== Qualified teams ==
Team	Qualification	Previous app.
Racing	1958 Primera División champion	**1913, 1914, 1916, 1917, 1918**, 1950
Liga Cordobesa	1958 Copa Presidente de la Nación champion	(None)

- **Bold** indicates winning years

== Overview ==
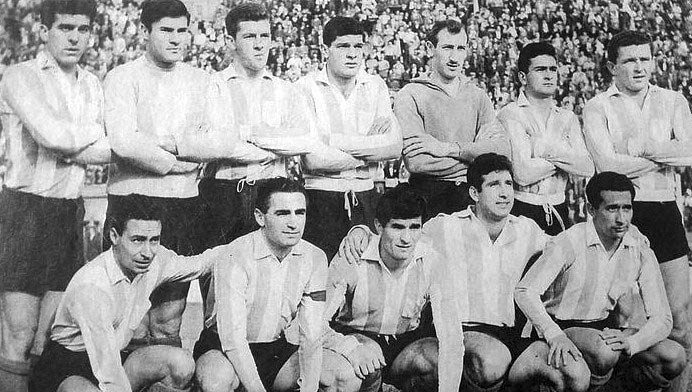
A team of Racing in 1960

The Liga Cordobesa had won the Copa de la República (also named "Campeonato Interligas") in December 1958 after defeating the Liga Mendocina of Mendoza Province) 1–0 in the final held in Gimnasia y Esgrima Stadium in the city of Mendoza. The team had previously eliminated Tres Arroyos (withdrew), and San Juan (2–1) representatives.

On the other hand, Racing Club had won the Primera División title in 1958 with 41 points in 30 matches played, above Boca Juniors and San Lorenzo which finished in the 2nd. and 3rd. positions respectively. Nevertheless, one of the most Racing notable players in that championship, Oreste Corbatta (considered the greatest idol in the history of Racing and regarded as the best Argentine winger ever) could not play the final.

Most of the footballers that played the final v the Cordobese team would then play in the Copa Suecia final vs Atlanta, held in April 1960.

== Match details ==
1958 Copa Ibarguren
13 March 1960

Liga Cordobesa	4–3	Racing
Wetcha 45', 80'; Mallo 72'; Vargas 84'	Report	Sosa 5'; Mottura 8'; Pizzuti 63'

C.A. Belgrano Stadium, Córdoba
Referee: Desiderio Fernández

**Liga Cordobesa**	**Racing**

GK	(Argentina) Paolucci
DF	(Argentina) Ponce
DF	(Argentina) Kasparian
MF	(Argentina) Campos
MF	(Argentina) Caro
MF	(Argentina) Vargas
FW	(Argentina) Esquivel
FW	(Argentina) Wetcha
FW	(Argentina) Romero
FW	(Argentina) Mallo
FW	(Argentina) Turquía
Manager:
(Argentina) ?

GK	(Argentina) Ataúlfo Sánchez
DF	(Argentina) Norberto Anido
DF	(Argentina) Juan Carlos Murúa
MF	(Argentina) Néstor De Vicente
MF	(Argentina) Vladislao Cap
MF	(Argentina) Roberto Pegnotti
FW	(Argentina) Manuel Murúa
FW	(Argentina) Juan José Pizzuti
FW	(Argentina) Oscar Mottura
FW	(Argentina) Rubén Sosa
FW	(Argentina) Raúl Belén
Manager:
(Argentina) José Della Torre
