= 1938 Copa Ibarguren =

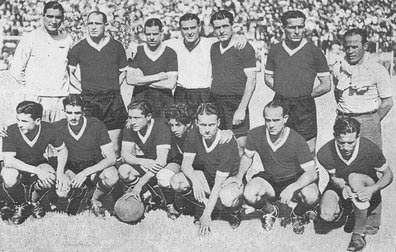
- An Independiente team of 1939
- Event: Copa Ibarguren
Independiente	Rosario Central
5	3
- Date: February 4, 1939; 87 years ago
- Venue: San Lorenzo Stadium, Buenos Aires
- Man of the Match: Vicente de la Mata
- Referee: Ubaldo Ruiz

The 1938 Copa Ibarguren was the 15th edition of the national cup of Argentina. It was played by the champions of both leagues, Primera División and Asociación Rosarina de Fútbol crowned during 1938.

Independiente (Primera División champion) faced Rosario Central (Liga Rosarina champion) at San Lorenzo de Almagro's venue, Estadio Gasómetro, in the Boedo neighborhood of Buenos Aires, on February 4, 1939. With three goals by forward Vicente de la Mata and two by striker Arsenio Erico, Independiente beat Central 5–3 and won its first Copa Ibarguren trophy.

By winning the Copa Ibarguren, Independiente had now won all of the competitions contested in Argentina in 1938 as the team had won the 1938 Copa Aldao two months earlier by beating Peñarol .

== Qualified teams ==
Team	Qualification	Previous appearances
Independiente	1938 Primera División champion	(none)
Rosario Central	1938 Asociación Rosarina champion	**1915**, 1916, 1917, 1919, 1923, 1937

- **Bold** indicates winning years

== Match details ==
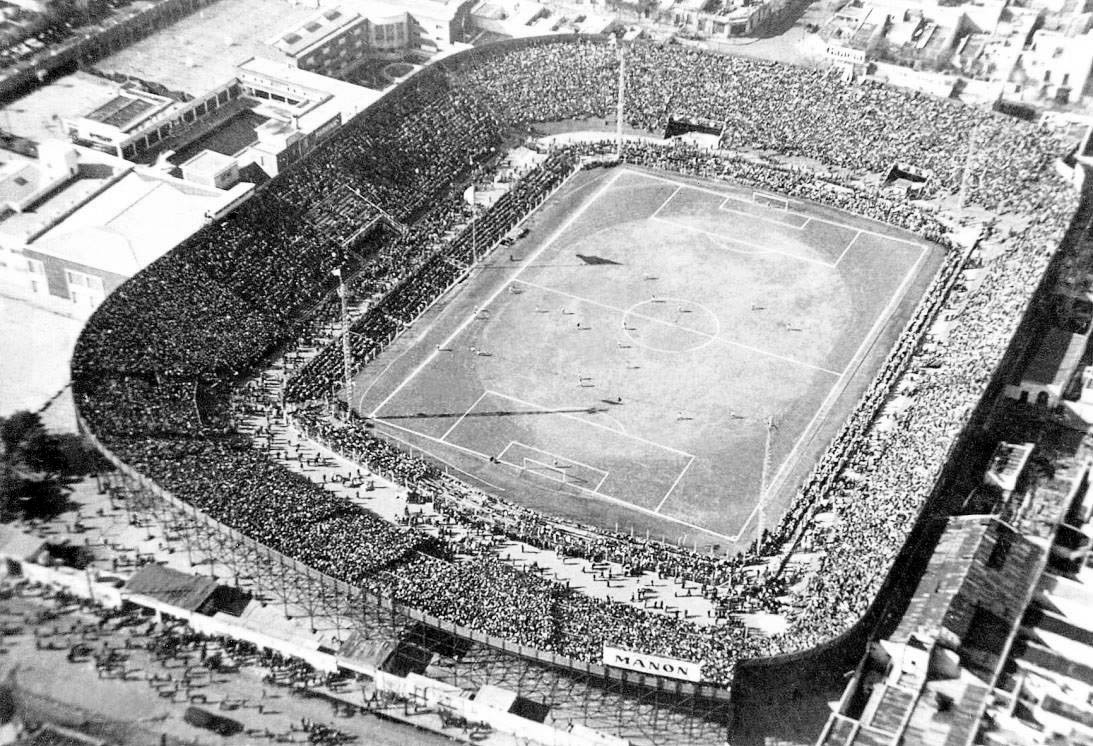
San Lorenzo Stadium, venue

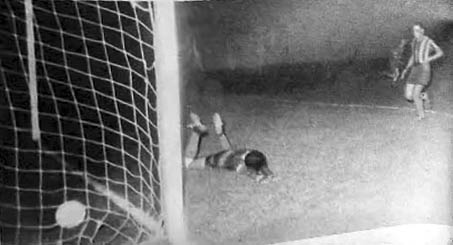
Arsenio Erico scoring

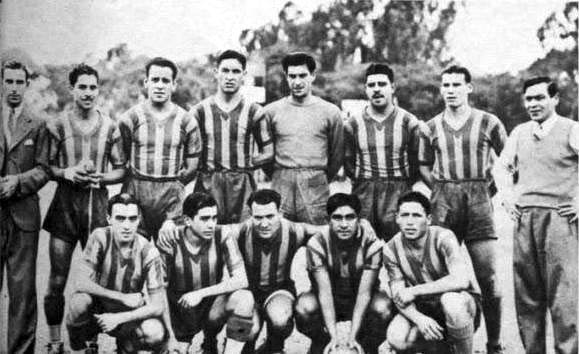
A Rosario Central team of 1939

1938 Copa Ibarguren
4 February 1939

Independiente	5–3	Rosario Central
de la Mata 21', 47', 50'; Erico 23', 45'		Laporta 9'; D'Alessandro 36', 48'

San Lorenzo Stadium, Buenos Aires
Referee: Ubaldo Ruiz

**Independiente**	**Rosario Central**

GK	(Argentina) Lorenzo Bignone
DF	(Spain) Fermín Lecea
DF	(Argentina) Sabino Coletta
MF	(Argentina) Luis Franzolini
MF	(Argentina) Raúl Leguizamón
MF	(Argentina) Celestino Martínez
FW	(Argentina) José Vilariño
FW	(Argentina) Vicente de la Mata
FW	(Argentina) Arsenio Erico
FW	(Argentina) Antonio Sastre
FW	(Argentina) Juan José Zorrilla
Manager:
(Argentina) Guillermo Ronzoni

GK	(Argentina) Juan Martínez
DF	(Argentina) Pedro Perucca
DF	(Argentina) Ignacio Díaz
MF	(Argentina) Clemente Verga
MF	(Argentina) Constancio Rivero
MF	(Argentina) Alfredo Fogel
FW	(Argentina) Francisco Rodríguez
FW	(Argentina) Salvador Laporta
FW	(Argentina) Roberto D'Alessandro
FW	(Argentina) Luis Amaya
FW	(Argentina) Aníbal Maffei
Manager:
(Argentina) Natalio Molinari
