= 1922 Copa Ibarguren =

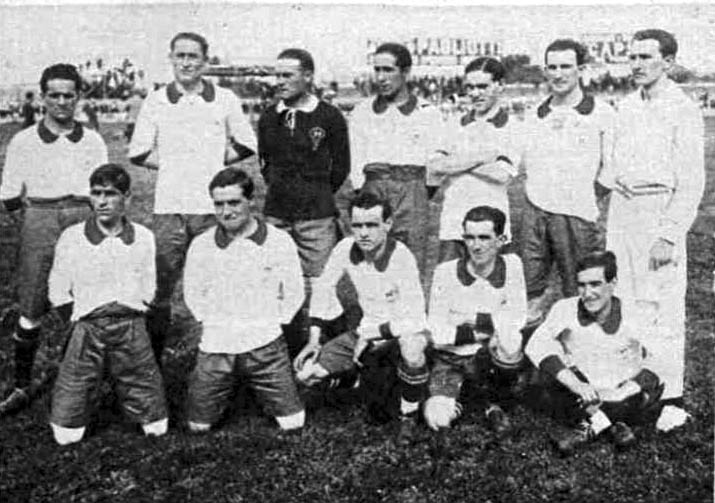
- A Huracán team of 1922
Huracán	Newell's Old Boys
1	1
- Date: January 29, 1922; 103 years ago
- Venue: Estadio Sportivo Barracas, Buenos Aires
- Referee: Gerónimo Repossi

1922 Copa Ibarguren Play-off
Huracán	Newell's Old Boys
1	0
- Date: January 29, 1922; 103 years ago
- Venue: Estadio Sportivo Barracas, Buenos Aires
- Referee: Gerónimo Repossi

The 1922 Copa Ibarguren was the tenth edition of this National cup of Argentina. It was played by the champions of both leagues, Primera División and Liga Rosarina de Football crowned during 1922.

Huracán (Primera División champion) faced Newell's Old Boys (Liga Rosarina champion) in a match held in Estadio Sportivo Barracas on March 4, 1923. As the match ended in a tie, both teams played a new game on April 22 at the same venue, where Huracán defeated Newell's 1–0 taking revenge from the previous edition and therefore winning its first Ibarguren trophy.

== Qualified teams ==
Team	Qualification	Previous appearances
Huracán	1922 Primera División champion	1921
Newell's Old Boys	1922 Copa Nicasio Vila champion	1913, 1918, **1921**

Note

- **Bold** indicates winning years

== Venue ==
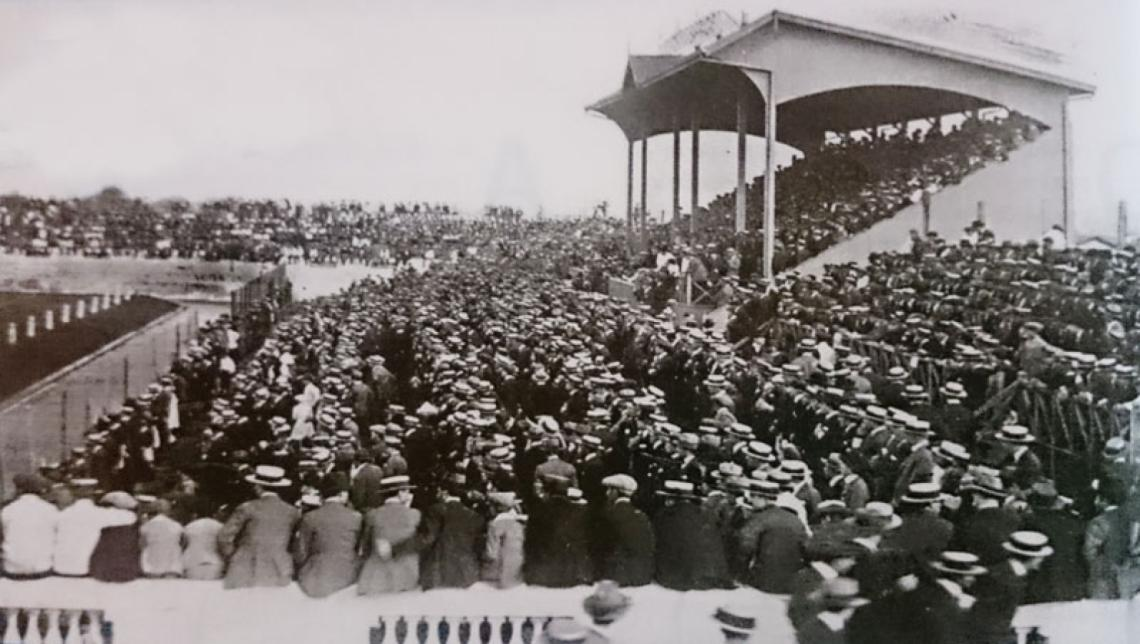
Sportivo Barracas, venue

== Match details ==
=== Final ===
1922 Copa Ibarguren
4 March 1923
Final

Huracán	1–1	Newell's Old Boys
Chiessa 84'	Report	Loyarte 25'

Estadio Sportivo Barracas
Referee: Gerónimo Repozzi

**Huracán**	**Newell's**

GK	(Argentina) Ernesto Kiessel
DF	(Italy) Carlos Nóbile
DF	(Argentina) Juan Pratto
MF	(Argentina) Miguel Fontana
MF	(Argentina) Ramón Vázquez
MF	(Argentina) Juan Scursoni
FW	(Argentina) Adán Loizo
FW	(Argentina) José Rodríguez
FW	(Argentina) José Laguna
FW	(Argentina) Ángel Chiesa
FW	(Argentina) Cesáreo Onzari

GK	(Argentina) Bernardo Nuin
DF	(Argentina) Adolfo Celli
DF	(Argentina) Isidoro Bourguignon
MF	(Argentina) Alfredo Chabrolín
MF	(Argentina) Ernesto Celli
MF	(Argentina) Fideolfo Salcedo
FW	(Argentina) Humberto Libonatti
FW	(Argentina) Julio Libonatti
FW	(Argentina) Atilio Badalini
FW	(Argentina) Tomás Loyarte
FW	(Argentina) Federico Garrone

=== Playoff ===
22 April 1923
Playoff

Huracán	1–0	Newell's Old Boys
Chiessa 40'	Report

Estadio Sportivo Barracas
Referee: Gerónimo Repozzi

**Huracán**	**Newell's**

GK	(Argentina) Ernesto Kiessel
DF	(Italy) Carlos Nóbile
DF	(Argentina) Juan Pratto
MF	(Argentina) Miguel Fontana
MF	(Argentina) Ramón Vázquez
MF	(Argentina) Juan Scursoni
FW	(Argentina) Adán Loizo
FW	(Argentina) José Rodríguez
FW	(Argentina) José Caldera
FW	(Argentina) Ángel Chiesa
FW	(Argentina) Cesáreo Onzari

GK	(Argentina) Bernardo Nuin
DF	(Argentina) Adolfo Celli
DF	(Argentina) Isidoro Bourguignon
MF	(Argentina) Domingo Correa
MF	(Argentina) Fideolfo Salcedo
MF	(Argentina) Alfredo Chabrolín
FW	(Argentina) Humberto Libonatti
FW	(Argentina) Julio Libonatti
FW	(Argentina) Atilio Badalini
FW	(Argentina) Ernesto Celli
FW	(Argentina) Federico Garrone
