= 1924 Copa Ibarguren =

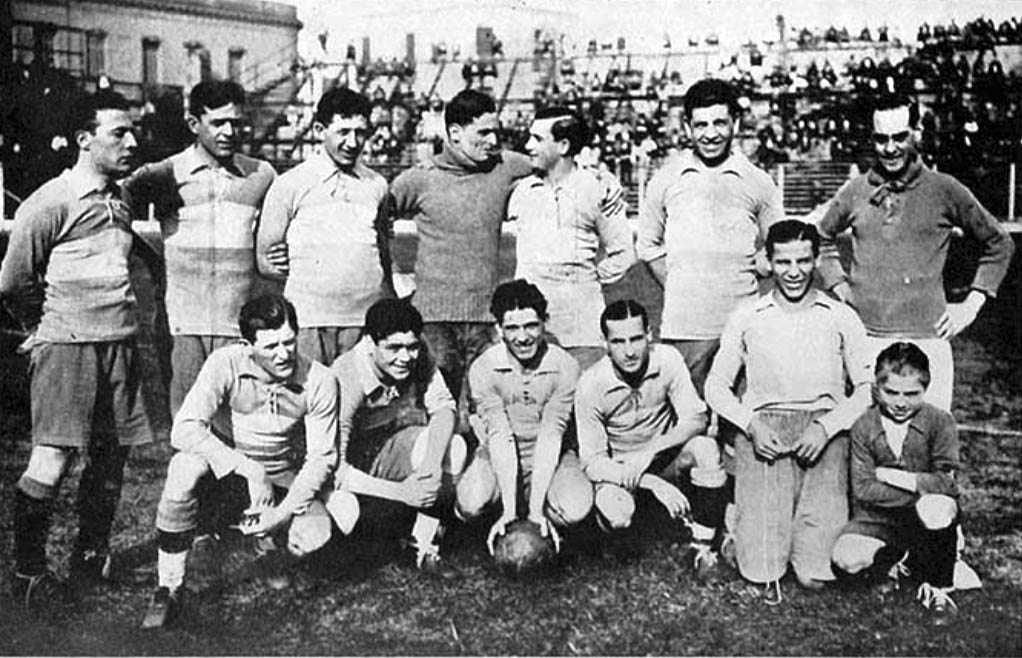
- A Boca Juniors team of 1926
Boca Juniors	Belgrano (R)
3	2
- Date: 13 May 1926; 99 years ago
- Venue: Sportivo Barracas, Buenos Aires
- Referee: Enrique López

The 1924 Copa Ibarguren was the twelfth edition of this National cup of Argentina. It was played by the champions of both leagues, Primera División and Liga Rosarina de Football crowned during 1924.

Boca Juniors (Primera División champion) faced Club Atlético Belgrano (champion of Copa Nicasio Vila organised by Liga Rosarina) at Sportivo Barracas Stadium. Although they had won their league titles in 1924, the final was played two years after, on 13 May 1926.

Belgrano had won the Copa Vila (the top football competition in Rosario). As three teams (Belgrano, Rosario Central and Tiro Federal) shared the first position at the end of the tournament, the LRF established a playoff to decide a champion. Belgrano defeated Rosario Central in the semifinal and Tiro Federal in the final, played on 23 November 1924 (1–0 in both cases) and was crowned champion. It was also the only Rosarian major title won by C.A. Belgrano.

== Qualified teams ==
Team	Qualification	Previous app.
Boca Juniors	1924 Primera División champion	**1919**, 1920, **1923**
Belgrano (R)	1924 Copa Vila champion	(none)

Note

- **Bold** indicates winning years

== Match details ==
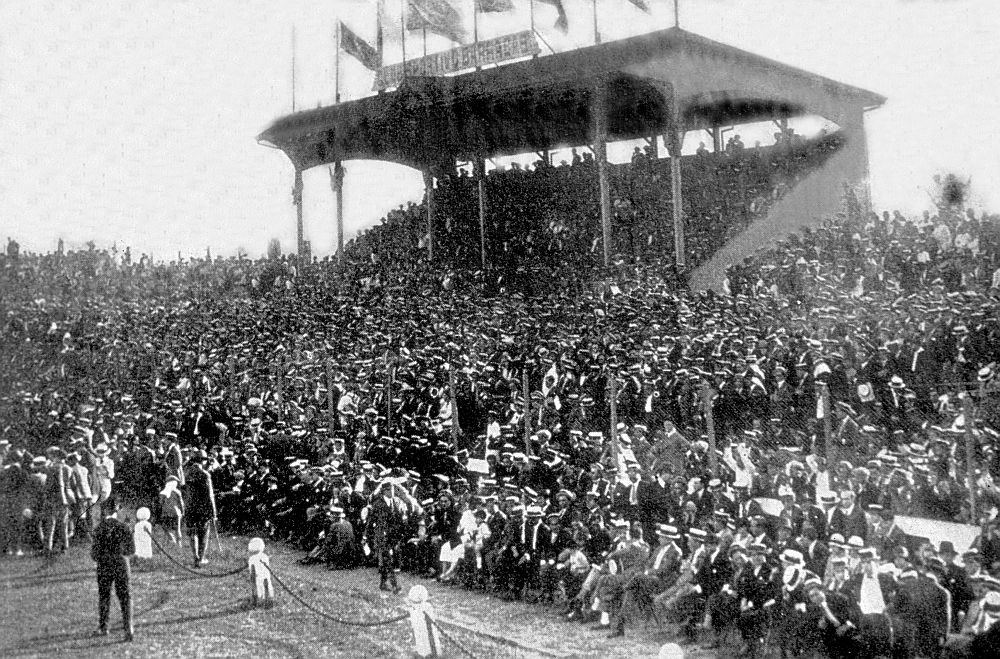
Sportivo Barracas, venue

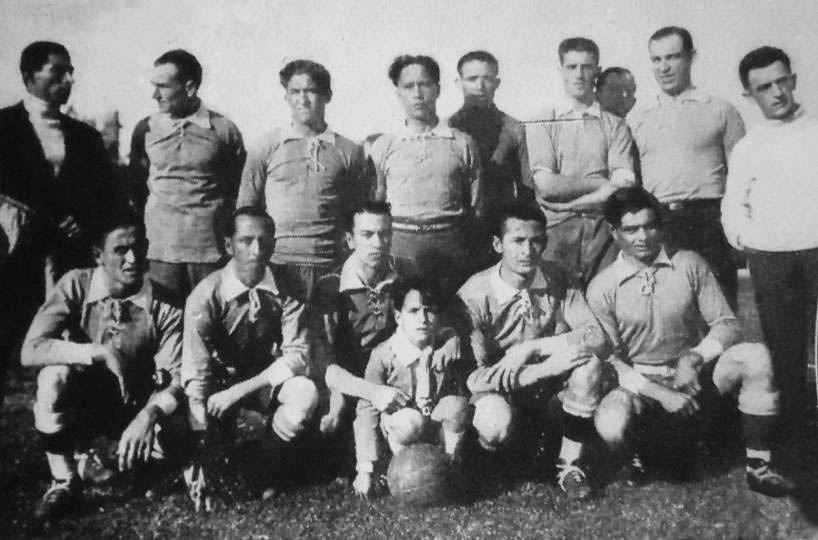
Team of Belgrano, runners-up

1924 Copa Ibarguren
13 May 1926

Boca Juniors	3–2	Belgrano (Rosario)
Tazza 52', 91'; Cherro 58'	Report	Bearzotti 16', 30'

Estadio Sportivo Barracas
Referee: Enrique López

**Boca Juniors**	**Belgrano (R)**

GK	(Argentina) Américo Tesoriere
DF	(Argentina) Ludovico Bidoglio
DF	(Argentina) Ramón Muttis
MF	(Argentina) Ángel Médici
MF	(Argentina) Mario Fortunato
MF	(Argentina) Alfredo Elli
FW	(Argentina) Domingo Tarasconi
FW	(Argentina) Antonio Cerrotti
FW	(Argentina) Angel Tazza
FW	(Argentina) Roberto Cherro
FW	(Argentina) Roberto Dighero

GK	Valeriano Boda
DF	Segundo Fernández
DF	Natalio Molinari
MF	Manuel Martínez
MF	Alejandro García
MF	Francisco Castillo
FW	Antonio de Felice
FW	Osvaldo Goicochea
FW	Adolfo Cristini
FW	Silvio Bearzotti
FW	Pedro Araujo
