= 1941 Copa Ibarguren =

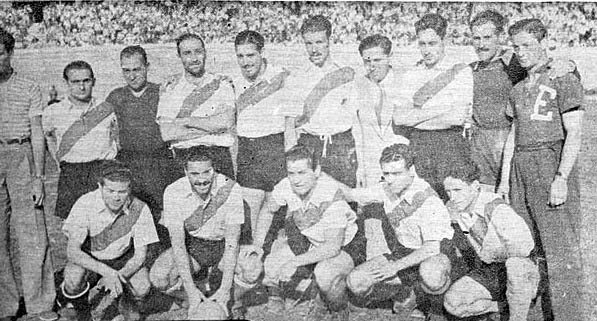
- A River Plate team of 1942
- Event: Copa Ibarguren
River Plate	Newell's Old Boys
3	0
- Date: 22 March 1942
- Venue: Ferro Carril Oeste, Buenos Aires
- Referee: Eugenio Braun

The 1941 Copa Ibarguren was the 18th edition of the national cup of Argentina. The final was played by the champions of both leagues, River Plate (Primera División), and Newell's Old Boys (Liga Rosarina de Football), both crowned during the 1941 seasons. The reserve squad of Newell's Old Boys was fielded for the match.

Managed by Renato Cesarini, River Plate beat Newell's 3–0 at Ferro Carril Oeste Stadium, winning their 2nd Copa Ibarguren title.

== Qualified teams ==
Team	Qualification	Previous app.
River Plate	1941 Primera División champion	**1937**
Newell's Old Boys	1941 Asociación Rosarina champion	1913, 1918, **1921**, 1922

- **Bold** indicates winning years

== Match details ==
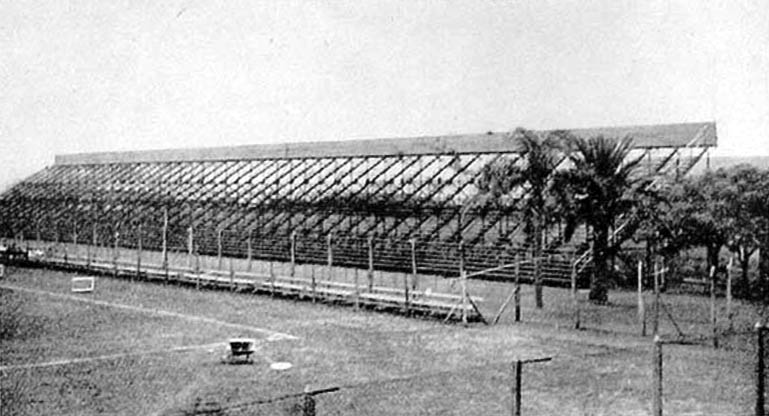
Ferro Carril Oeste, venue

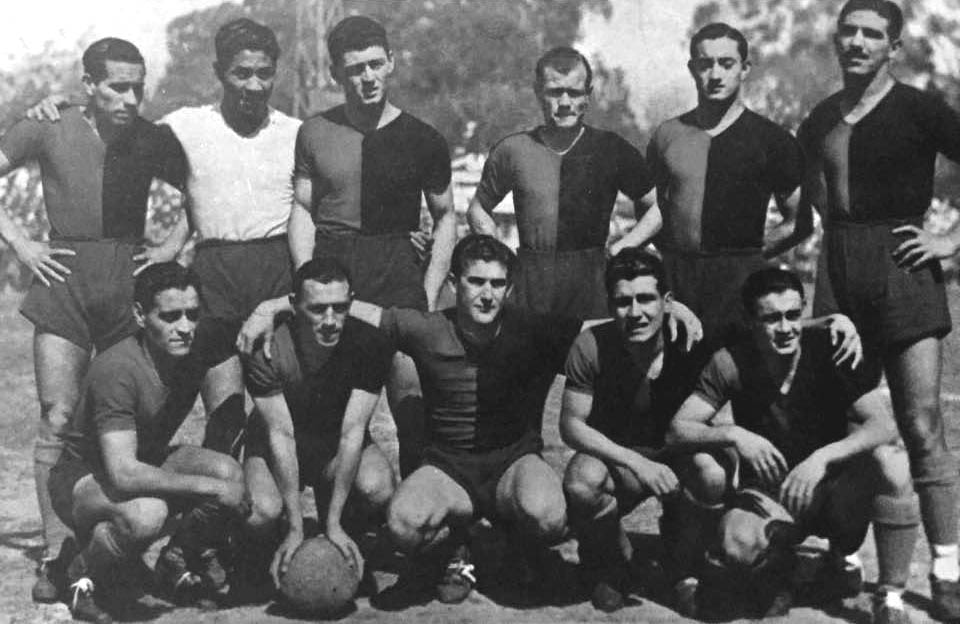
A Newell's team of 1942

1941 Copa Ibarguren
22 March 1942

River Plate	3–0	Newell's Old Boys
Pedernera 5'; Labruna 16' (pen.); D'Alessandro 33'	Report

Ferro Carril Oeste, Buenos Aires
Referee: Eugenio Braun

**River Plate**	**Newell's**

GK	(Uruguay) Julio Barrios
DF	(Argentina) Ricardo Vaghi
DF	(Uruguay) Avelino Cadilla
MF	(Argentina) Norberto Yácono
MF	(Argentina) Bruno Rodolfi
MF	(Argentina) José Ramos
FW	(Argentina) Juan Carlos Muñoz
FW	(Argentina) Roberto D'Alessandro
FW	(Argentina) Adolfo Pedernera
FW	(Argentina) Ángel Labruna
FW	(Argentina) Aristóbulo Deambrossi
Manager:
(Argentina) Renato Cesarini

GK	(Argentina) Aldo Ramacciotti;
DF	(Argentina) Carlos Cardona
DF	(Argentina) Osvaldo Garbagnoli
MF	(Argentina) Américo Villarruel
MF	(Argentina) Antonio Carlucci
MF	(Argentina) Carlos Pellegrini
FW	(Argentina) Juan Gayol
FW	(Argentina) Humberto Fiore
FW	(Argentina) Raúl Frutos
FW	(Argentina) Francisco Dorado
FW	(Argentina) Mariano Sánchez
Manager:
(Argentina) Adolfo Celli
