= Claudio Vacca =

Argentine footballer

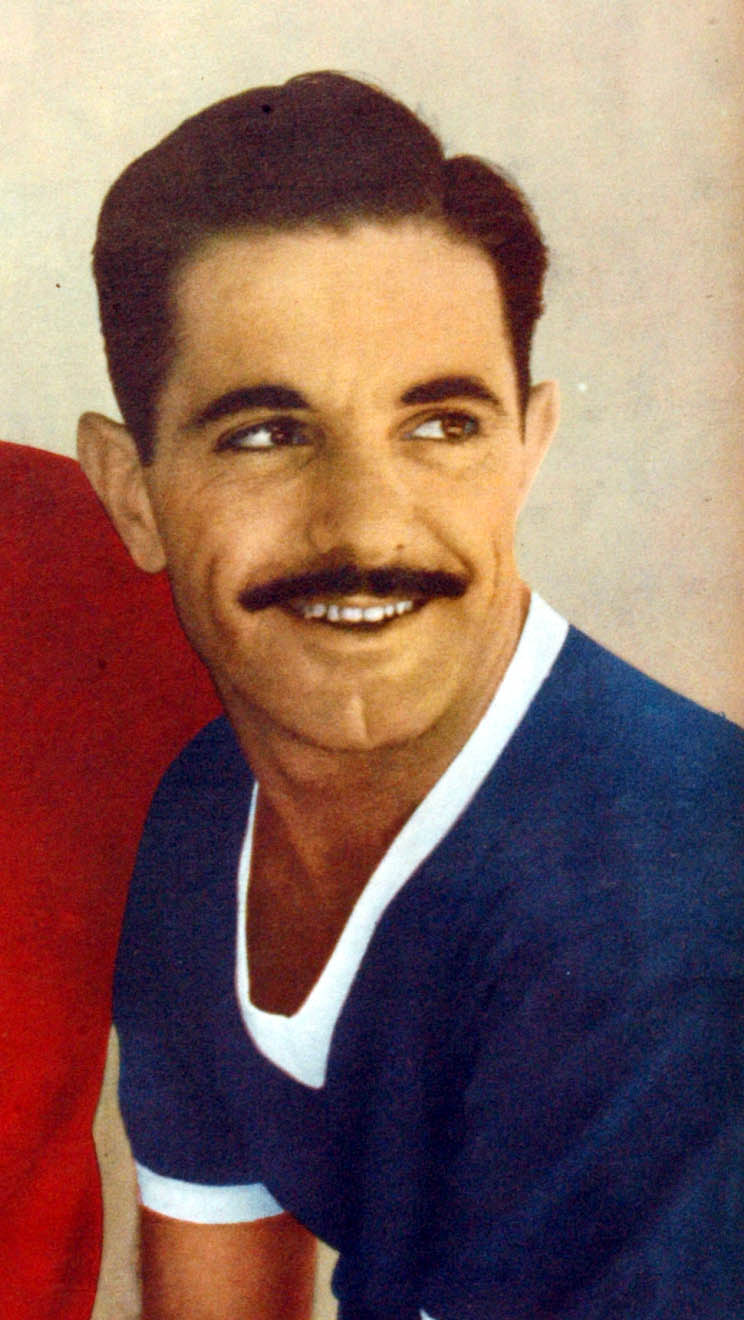
- Vacca pictured in 1946

Personal information
- Full name: Claudio Vacca
- Date of birth: October 24, 1915
- Date of death: January 27, 1995 (aged 79)
- Position: Goalkeeper

Senior career*
Years	Team	Apps	(Gls)
1935–38	Huracán		(0)
1938–50	Boca Juniors	335	(0)
	Defensor Sporting		(0)
- * Club domestic league appearances and goals

Claudio Vacca (October 24, 1915 – January 28, 1995) was an Argentine football goalkeeper who played most of his career at Boca Juniors during 12 years and winning 6 titles. Due to his agility, good performances and long-term stay in the team, he is regarded as one of the Boca Juniors' key players in the 1940s.

== Career ==
Having started his career in Huracán, in 1938 Vacca went to Boca Juniors after the departure of Juan Yustrich who had been sold to Gimnasia y Esgrima de La Plata due to a legal conflict with the club managers. Vacca was acquired along with the other Huracán goalkeeper, Juan Estrada, who was chosen by the coach for the starting the line-up leaving Vacca as the substitute goalkeeper. Nevertheless, Vacca was part of the team in some matches, most of them, friendly games. His official debut was in the 1938 league v San Lorenzo de Almagro, on 7 Aug.

In 1943, after a failed performance of Estrada, Vacca had the opportunity to play in the starting line-up, which him would never leave until he finished his tenure in Boca Juniors in 1950.

Apart from winning 6 titles with Boca Juniors, Vacca also played for the Argentina national football team 7 times, receiving 12 goals. His debut with the national team was on December 16, 1945, facing Brazil, a match that Argentina won 4–3. Vacca's last game with Boca Juniors was on August 6, 1950, v Banfield. Vacca later continued his career in the Uruguayan club Defensor Sporting, where he retired from football in 1951.

After his retirement, Vacca returned to Boca Juniors to become executive of the club in 1954, and then coach of the team in 1959. He died in Buenos Aires on January 28, 1995.

== Titles ==
=== Club ===
Boca Juniors

- Primera División (2): 1943, 1944
- Copa Ibarguren (2): 1940, 1944
- Copa de Competencia Británica (1): 1946
- Copa Escobar-Gerona (1): 1946

=== National team ===
Argentina

- Copa América (1): 1946
