= 1942 Copa Ibarguren =

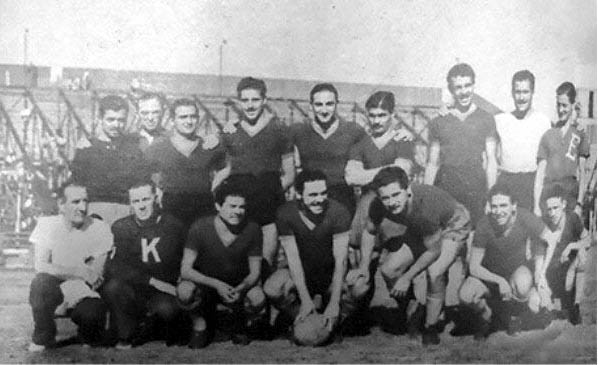
- River Plate, champions
- Event: Copa Ibarguren
River Plate	Liga Cordobesa
7	0
- Date: 4 April 1943
- Venue: San Lorenzo Stadium, Buenos Aires
- Referee: Eduardo Forte

The 1942 Copa Ibarguren was the 19th edition of a national cup of Argentina. From this edition onwards, the cup was contested by the winners of Primera División and the Copa Presidente de la Nación (a competition formed by teams from regional leagues).

The final was contested by River Plate (1942 Primera División champion), and Liga Cordobesa de Fútbol ("Córdoba League"), champion of the 1942 Copa Presidente.

Due to the similarity of both teams' shirts, the referee forced River Plate (as the home team) to change their kit. As River Plate had not brought alternate shirts, host club San Lorenzo de Almagro lent them their blue and red shirts to play the match. River Plate thrashed Liga Cordobesa 7–0 at Estadio Gasómetro, winning their 3rd Copa Ibarguren title.

== Qualified teams ==
Team	Qualification	Previous app.
River Plate	1942 Primera División champion	**1937, 1941**
Liga Cordobesa de Fútbol	1942 Copa Presidente de la Nación champion	(None)

- **Bold** indicates winning years

== Match details ==
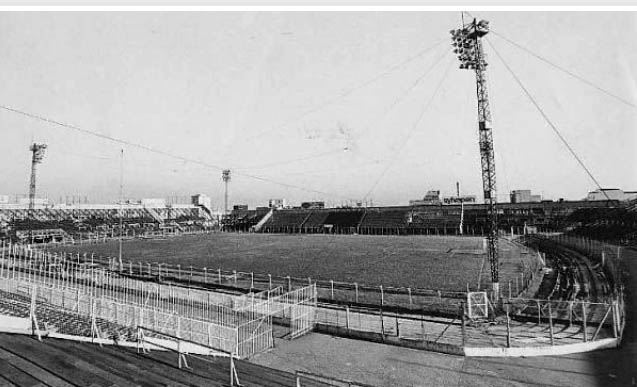
San Lorenzo Stadium, venue

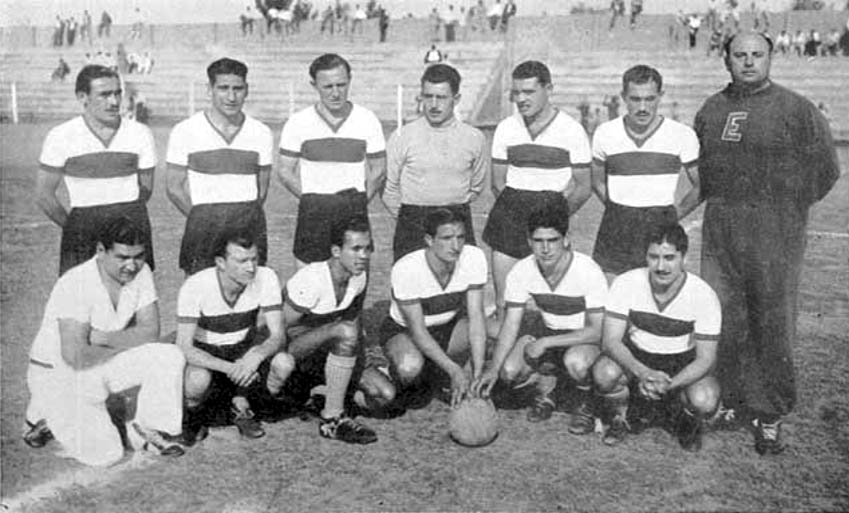
Liga Cordobesa team

1942 Copa Ibarguren
4 April 1943

River Plate	7–0	Liga Cordobesa
Deambrossi 8', 68'; Loustau 57', 75'; Labruna 73'; Pedernera 85'; Moreno 89'	Report

San Lorenzo Stadium, Buenos Aires
Referee: Eduardo Forte

**River Plate**	**Liga Cordobesa**

GK	(Uruguay) Julio Barrios
DF	(Argentina) Ricardo Vaghi
DF	(Argentina) Luis A. Ferreyra
MF	(Argentina) Norberto Yácono
MF	(Argentina) Eusebio Videla
MF	(Argentina) José Ramos
FW	(Argentina) Aristóbulo Deambrossi
FW	(Argentina) José Manuel Moreno
FW	(Argentina) Adolfo Pedernera
FW	(Argentina) Ángel Labruna
FW	(Argentina) Félix Loustau
Manager:
(Argentina) Renato Cesarini

GK	(Argentina) Rama
DF	(Argentina) Restelli
DF	(Argentina) Murúa
MF	(Argentina) Giménez
MF	(Argentina) Rivero
MF	(Argentina) Musante
FW	(Argentina) Lorente
FW	(Argentina) Lutti
FW	(Argentina) Bianchi
FW	(Argentina) Martínez Rivanera
FW	(Argentina) Videla
Manager:
(Argentina) ?
