= Copa Presidente =

Copa Presidente may refer to the following association football tournaments:

- Copa El Salvador, a Salvadoran domestic cup tournament formally known as the Copa Presidente
- Copa Presidente de la Nación, a defunct Argentine domestic cup tournament
- Honduran Cup, a Honduran domestic cup tournament also known as the Copa Presidente
