= 1950 Copa Ibarguren =

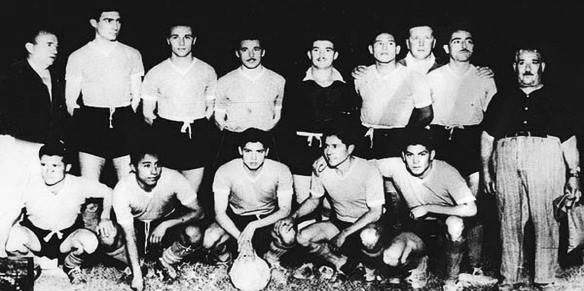
- A team of Liga Mendocina of 1950
- Event: Copa Ibarguren
Liga Mendocina	Racing
3	2
- Date: 17 December 1950
- Venue: Gimnasia y Esgrima Stadium, Mendoza
- Referee: Richard Maddison

The 1950 Copa Ibarguren was the 20th. edition of this national cup of Argentina. Since this edition, the cup was contested by the winners of Primera División and Copa Presidente de la Nación (a competition formed by teams from regional leagues).

The final was contested by Racing Club de Avellaneda (1950 Primera División champion), and Liga Mendocina de Fútbol ("Mendoza League"), champion of 1950 Copa Presidente de la Nación.

Liga Mendoza beat Racing (which played a Copa Ibarguren after 32 years since their last participation) 3–2, winning their first national title.

== Qualified teams ==
Team	Qualification	Previous app.
Racing	1950 Primera División champion	**1913, 1914**, 1915, **1916, 1917, 1918**
Liga Mendocina	1950 Copa Presidente champion	(None)

- **Bold** indicates winning years

== Overview ==
The Liga Mendocina team had had a good performance in the 1950 Copa Presidente de la Nación, thrashing Misiones 6–1 in their debut. In quarter final, they easily defeated Buenos Aires (4–0) to reach the semifinal where they had to play an extra time after the match ended 2–2 in regular time. As the match continued equaled after the extension, Liga Mendocina qualified to the final by 15–3 on corner kicks awarded, a curious rule that was also used in Copa Adrián C. Escobar. In the final at Gimmnasia y Esgrima Stadium in Mendoza capital city, Liga Mendocina beat Córdoba 2–1.

On the other hand, Racing Club, coached by Guillermo Stábile, had won the Primera División title in the last two seasons, 1949 and 1950. The great moment of the club included the inauguration of a modern stadium, Estadio Presidente Perón, that same year. It replaced the old Racing Stadium closed in 1947.

== Match details ==
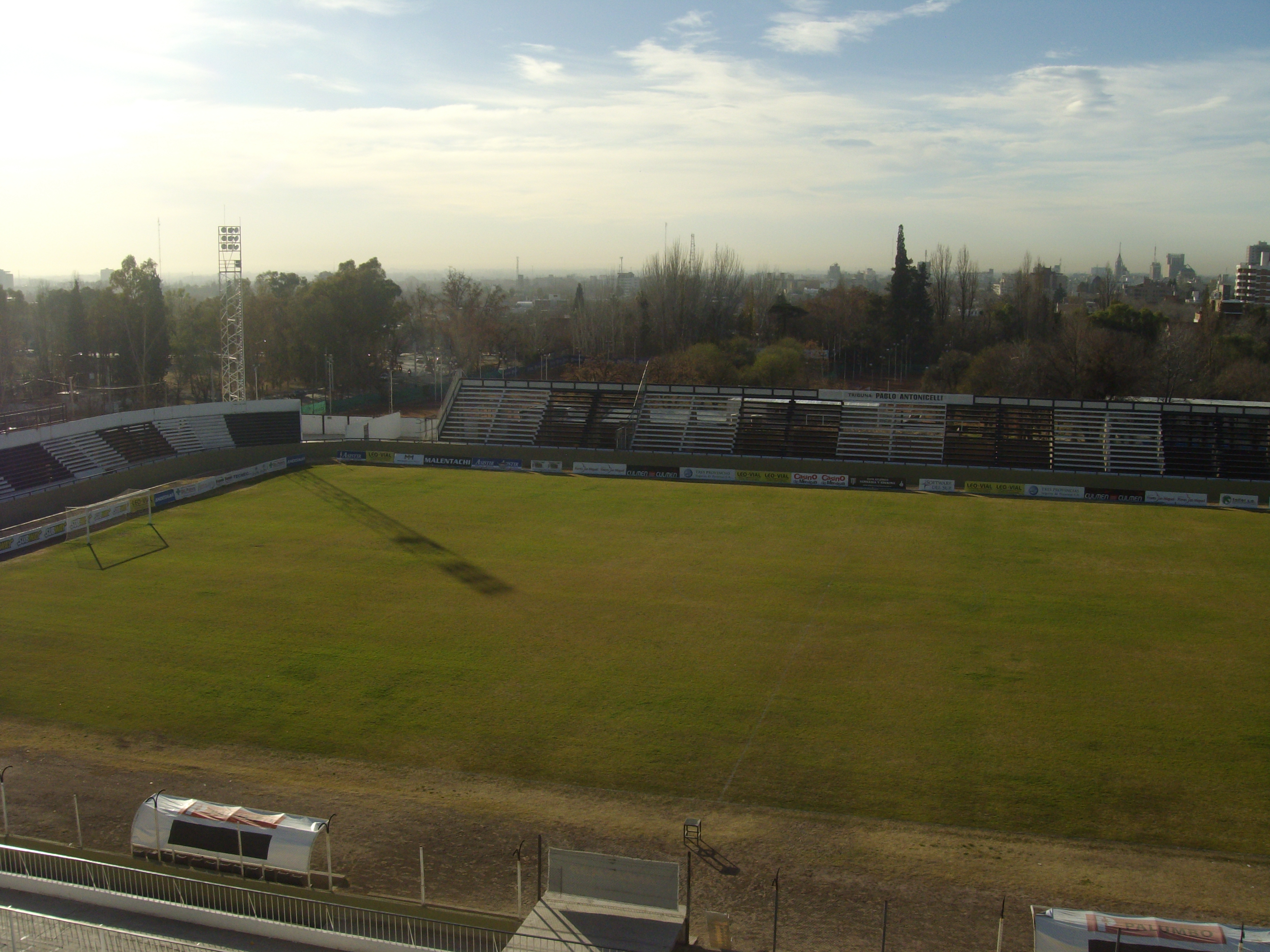
Gimnasia y Esgrima (M), venue

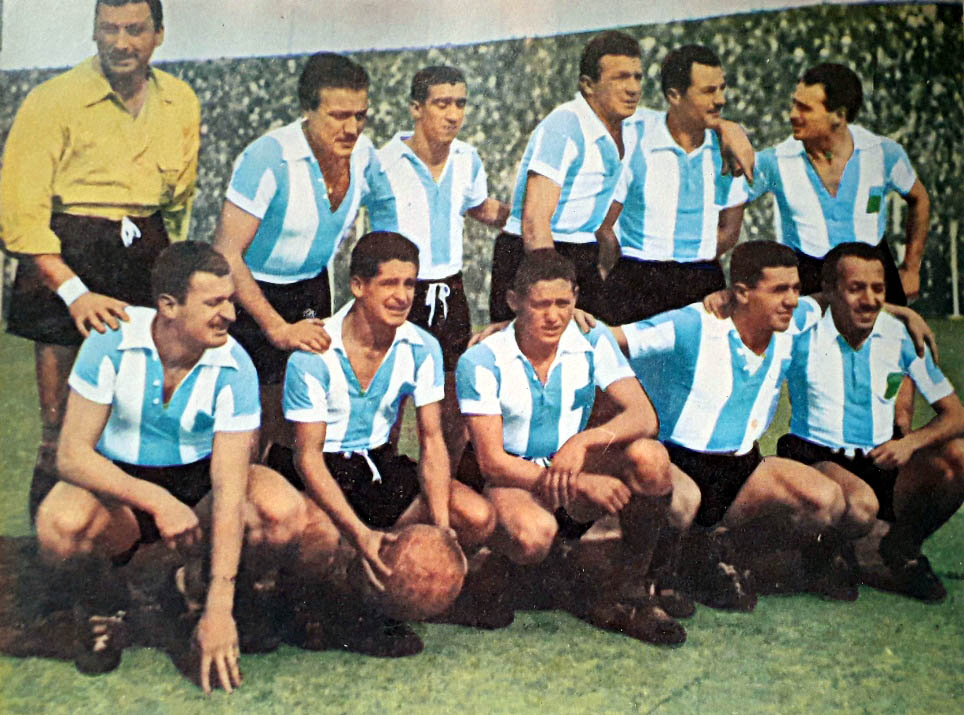
A Racing Club team of 1950

1950 Copa Ibarguren
17 December 1950

Liga Mendocina	3–2	Racing
García 16' (o.g.); Godoy 58', 80'	Report	Bravo 25'; Salvini 90'

Gimnasia y Esgrima Stadium, Mendoza
Referee: Richard Maddison

**Liga Mendocina**	**Racing**

GK	(Uruguay) Primo Palazzo
DF	(Argentina) Oscar Gaggino
DF	(Argentina) Rolando Bolognesi
MF	(Argentina) Vicente Cosenza
MF	(Argentina) Bustos
MF	(Argentina) Domingo Poletti
FW	(Argentina) Bautista Rivas
FW	(Argentina) Domingo Godoy
FW	(Argentina) José Giarrizo
FW	(Argentina) Luis Amaya
FW	(Argentina) Medardo Sosa
Manager:
(Argentina) ?

GK	(Argentina) Manuel Graneros
DF	(Spain) Higinio García
DF	(Argentina) José García Pérez
MF	(Argentina) Juan Carlos Fonda
MF	(Argentina) Saúl Ongaro
MF	(Argentina) Ernesto Gutiérrez
FW	(Argentina) Juan Carlos Salvini
FW	(Argentina) Norberto Méndez
FW	(Argentina) Rubén Bravo
FW	(Argentina) Llamil Simes
FW	(Argentina) Ezra Sued
Manager:
(Argentina) Guillermo Stábile
