= Copa Ibarguren =

Copa Dr. Carlos Ibarguren
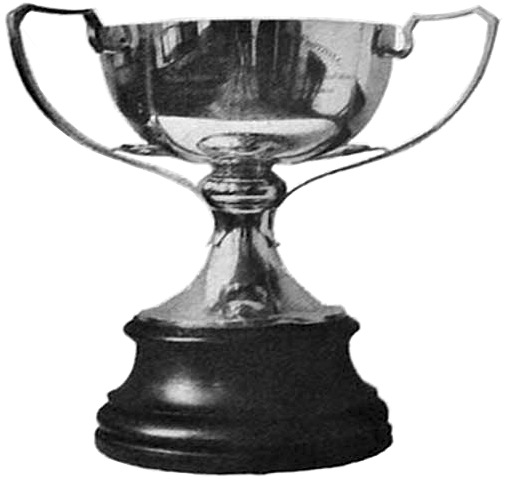
- The trophy awarded to champions
- Organiser(s): AFA
- Founded: 1913
- Abolished: 1958; 68 years ago
- Region: Argentina
- Teams: 2
- Related competitions: Primera División; Liga Rosarina; Copa Presidente
- Last champions: Liga Cordobesa (1958)
- Most championships: Racing; Boca Juniors (5 titles each)

The Copa Dr. Carlos Ibarguren, also called Campeonato Argentino or simply Copa Ibarguren was an official Argentine football cup competition contested between 1913 and 1958. Between 1913 and 1925, the winner of the cup received the honor to be the "Argentine Champion". That is because the cup faced the two strongest champions of the country, represented by the Buenos Aires league (Primera División) and the Rosario league (with its affiliated teams competing in Copa Nicasio Vila, the main division of LRF).

== History ==
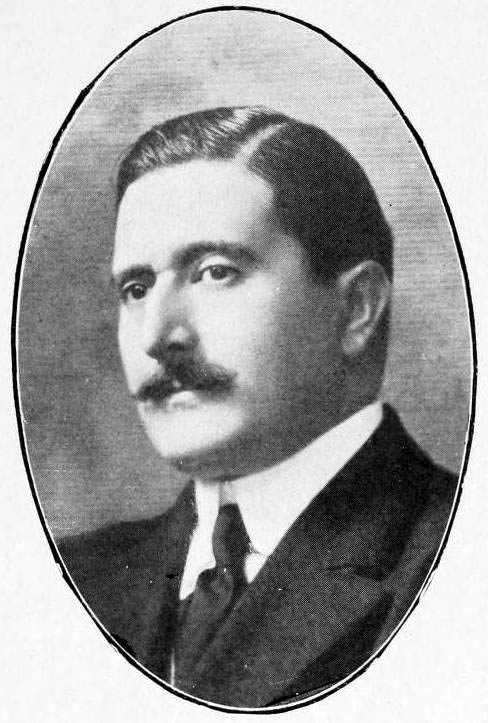
Carlos Ibarguren, Minister of Public Instruction of Argentina, donated the trophy

The trophy was donated by the Argentine Minister of Public Instruction Dr. Carlos Ibarguren to be played between the champions of all of the regional leagues in Argentina. The cup was only ever contested as a one off game between:

- 1913–1938: Primera División vs Liga Rosarina
- 1939: Primera División vs Litoral league
- 1940–1941: Primera División vs Asociación Rosarina
- 1942–1958: Primera División vs Copa Presidente de la Nación

== List of champions ==
=== Finals ===
The following list includes all the editions of the Copa Ibarguren:

Keys
- aet: after extra time
- Final defined in a playoff match.

Ed.	Year	Champion	Score	Runner-up	Venue	City
1	1913	Racing (1)	3–1	Newell's Old Boys	Racing	Avellaneda
2	1914	Racing (2)	1-0	Rosario Central	Estudiantes BA (Note: Estudiantes de Buenos Aires had its field in Palermo, Buenos Aires)	Buenos Aires
3	1915	Rosario Central (1)	0–0 (a.e.t.)	Racing	Independiente	Avellaneda
3	1915	Rosario Central (1)	3–1	Racing	GEBA	Buenos Aires
4	1916	Racing (3)	6–0	Rosario Central	Racing	Avellaneda
5	1917	Racing (4)	3–2	Rosario Central	GEBA	Buenos Aires
6	1918	Racing (5)	4–0	Newell's Old Boys	GEBA	Buenos Aires
7	1919	Boca Juniors (1)	1–0	Rosario Central	GEBA	Buenos Aires
8	1920	Tiro Federal (1)	1–2 (Note: The first match (won by Boca Juniors) was annulled because it had fielded ineligible players. Therefore a second game was held, being won by Tiro Federal.)	Boca Juniors	Sportivo Barracas	Buenos Aires
8	1920	Tiro Federal (1)	4–0	Boca Juniors	Boca Juniors	Buenos Aires
9	1921	Newell's Old Boys (1)	3–0	Huracán	Boca Juniors	Buenos Aires
10	1922	Huracán (1)	1–1	Newell's Old Boys	Sportivo Barracas	Buenos Aires
10	1922	Huracán (1)	1–0	Newell's Old Boys	Sportivo Barracas	Buenos Aires
11	1923	Boca Juniors (2)	1–0	Rosario Central	Sportivo Barracas	Buenos Aires
12	1924	Boca Juniors (3)	3–2 (a.e.t.)	Belgrano (R)	Sportivo Barracas	Buenos Aires
13	1925	Huracán (2)	2–1	Tiro Federal	Huracán	Buenos Aires
14	1937	River Plate (1)	5–0	Rosario Central	San Lorenzo	Buenos Aires
15	1938	Independiente (1)	5–3	Rosario Central	San Lorenzo	Buenos Aires
16	1939	Independiente (2)	5–0	Central Córdoba	San Lorenzo	Buenos Aires
17	1940	Boca Juniors (4)	5–1	Rosario Central	Chacarita Juniors (Note: Located on Humboldt and Padilla, in Villa Crespo)	Buenos Aires
18	1941	River Plate (2)	3–0	Newell's Old Boys	Chacarita Juniors	Buenos Aires
19	1942	River Plate (3)	7–0	Liga Cordobesa	San Lorenzo	Buenos Aires
20	1944	Boca Juniors (5)	6–0	Liga Tucumana	Atlético Tucumán	Tucumán
21	1950 (Note: This edition has not been included in the list of national cup winners at the AFA website.)	Liga Mendocina (1)	3–2	Racing	Gimnasia y Esgrima	Mendoza
22	1952	River Plate (4) (Note: The playoff was never held. In June 29, 1955, AFA awarded both teams the title.)	1–1 (a.e.t.)	–	C.A. Mitre	Santiago del Estero
22	1952	Liga Cultural (SdE) (1)	1–1 (a.e.t.)	–	C.A. Mitre	Santiago del Estero
23	1958	Liga Cordobesa (1)	4–3	Racing	C.A. Belgrano	Córdoba

=== Titles by team ===
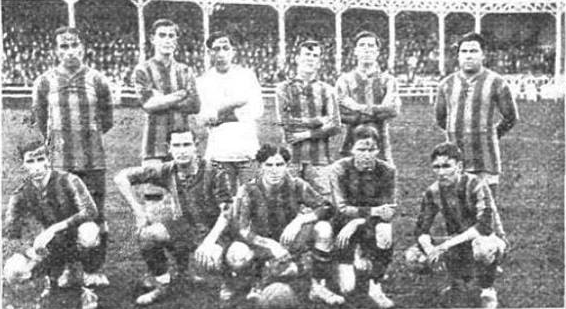
The Rosario Central squad that won the Copa Ibarguren after beating Racing Club. Central was the first Rosario's team to be declared Argentine Champion, in 1915

Rank	Team	Titles	Years won
1	Racing	5	1913, 1914, 1916, 1917, 1918
1	Boca Juniors	5	1919, 1923, 1924, 1940, 1944
2	River Plate	4	1937, 1941, 1942, 1952 (Note: Title shared.)
3	Huracán	2	1922, 1925
3	Independiente	2	1938, 1939
1	Rosario Central	1	1915
1	Tiro Federal	1	1920
1	Newell's Old Boys	1	1921
1	Liga Cultural (SdE) (Note: Current Liga Santiagueña de Fútbol.)	1	1952
1	Liga Cordobesa (Note: The team from Córdoba Football League defeated Racing by 4–3 but AFA does not mention the Regional representative as champion on its website. Moreover, AFA does not even cite the tournament.)	1	1958
