= 1921 Copa Ibarguren =

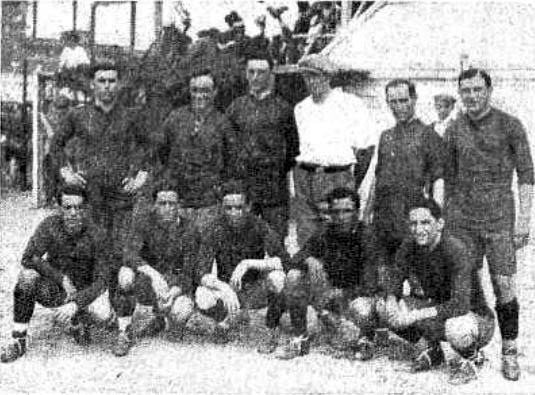
- Newell's Old Boys, champions
Huracán	Newell's Old Boys
0	3
- Date: January 29, 1922; 103 years ago
- Venue: Boca Juniors Stadium, Buenos Aires
- Referee: Gerónimo Repossi

The 1921 Copa Ibarguren was the ninth edition of this National cup of Argentina. It was played by the champions of both leagues, Primera División and Liga Rosarina de Football crowned during 1921.

Huracán (Primera División champion) faced Newell's Old Boys (Liga Rosarina champion) in a match held in Boca Juniors Stadium on January 29, 1922. Newell's won 3–0 winning its first and only Ibarguren trophy.

== Qualified teams ==
Team	Qualification	Previous app.
Huracán	1921 Primera División champion	(none)
Newell's Old Boys	1921 Copa Nicasio Vila champion	1913, 1918

Note

- **Bold** indicates winning years

== Match details ==
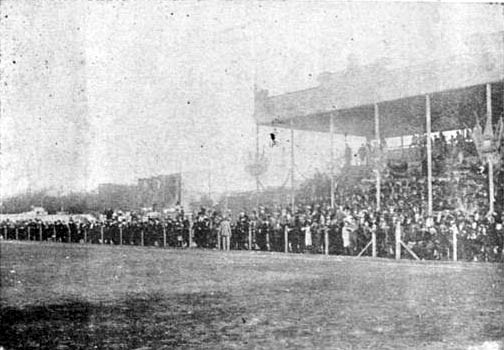
Boca Juniors stadium, venue

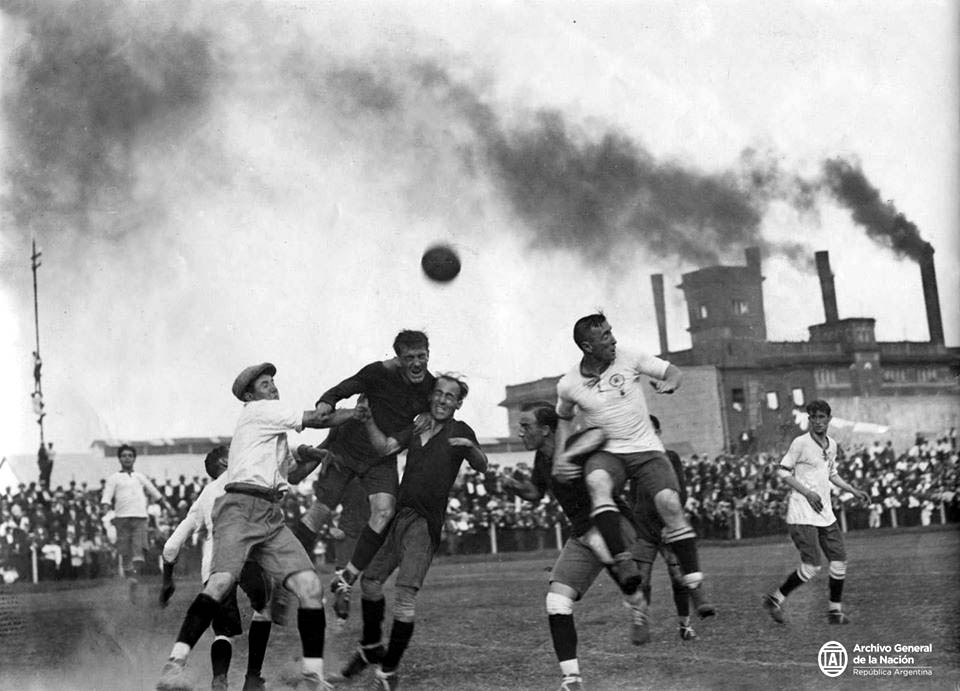
A fierce moment of the match

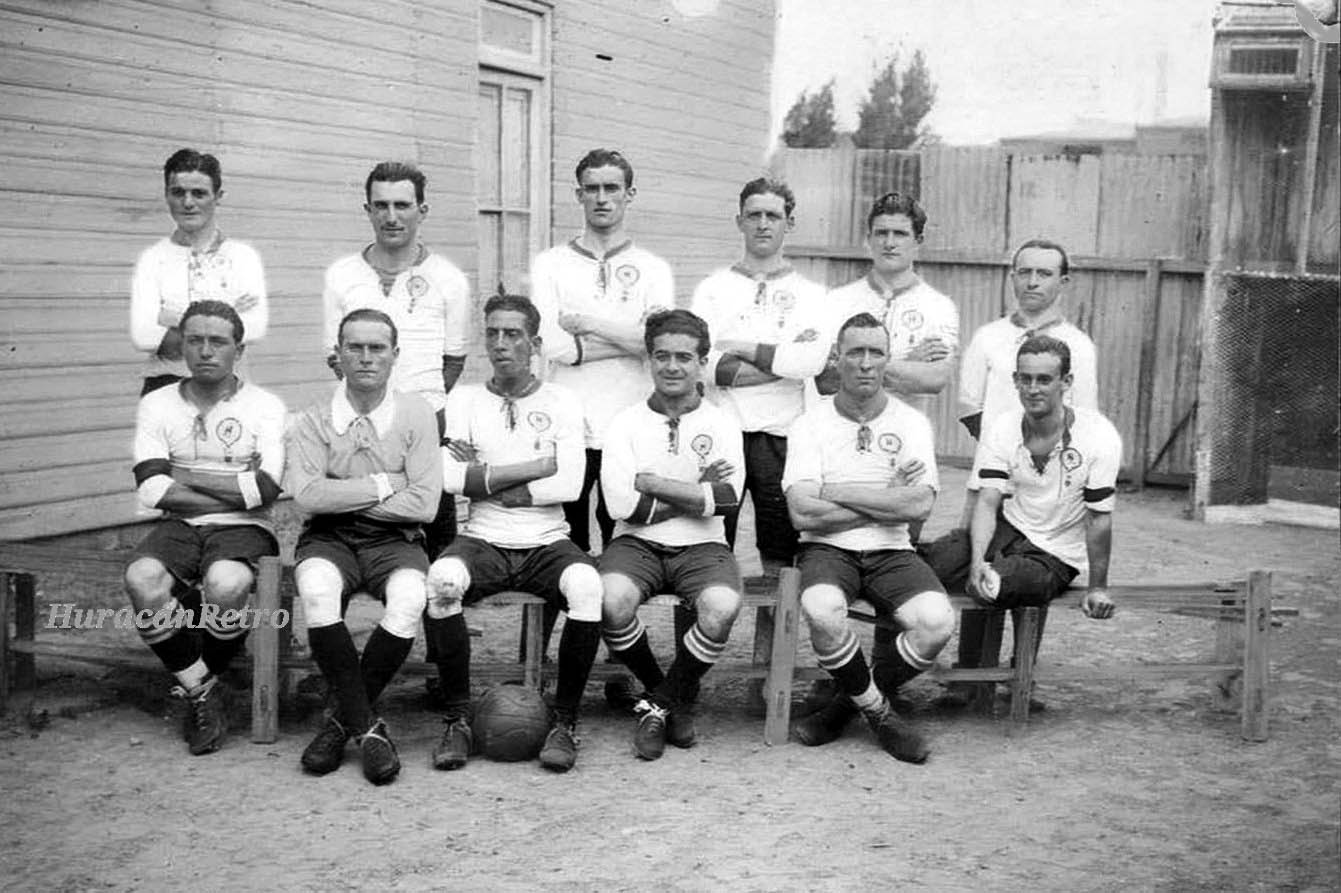
Team of Huracán, runners-up

1921 Copa Ibarguren
29 January 1922

Huracán	0–3	Newell's Old Boys
	Report	Badalini 25', 31'; Libonatti 44'

Boca Juniors Stadium
Referee: Gerónimo Repozzi

**Huracán**	**Newell's**

GK	(Argentina) Ernesto Kiessel
DF	(Argentina) Eduardo Baldinelli
DF	(Argentina) Enrique Monti
MF	(Argentina) Miguel Fontana
MF	(Argentina) Ramón Vázquez
MF	(Argentina) Luis Monti
FW	(Argentina) Miguel Ginebra
FW	(Argentina) José Laguna
FW	(Argentina) Ángel Chiessa
FW	(Argentina) Guillermo Dannaher
FW	(Argentina) S. Carreras

GK	(Argentina) Bernardo Nuin
DF	(Argentina) Adolfo Celli
DF	(Argentina) Isidoro Bourguignon
MF	(Argentina) Alfredo L. Chabrolín
MF	(Argentina) Fideolfo Salcedo
MF	(Argentina) Alfonso Grenón
FW	(Argentina) Humberto Libonatti
FW	(Argentina) Julio Libonatti
FW	(Argentina) Atilio Badalini
FW	(Argentina) Blas Saruppo
FW	(Argentina) Ernesto Celli
