= 1920 Copa Ibarguren =

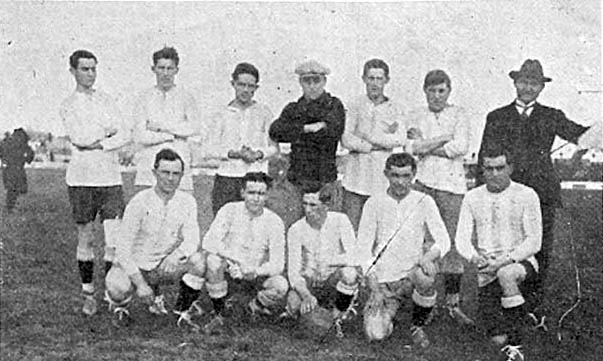
- A Tiro Federal team of 1920
- Event: Copa Ibarguren
Boca Juniors	Tiro Federal
2	1
- Match annulled
- Date: 1 June 1921
- Venue: Estadio Sportivo Barracas, Buenos Aires
- Referee: Gerónimo Repossi

Rematch
- Event: Copa Ibarguren
Boca Juniors	Tiro Federal
0	4
- Replay match
- Date: 5 February 1922
- Venue: Boca Juniors Stadium, Buenos Aires
- Referee: Servando Pérez

The 1920 Copa Ibarguren was the eighth edition of this national cup of Argentina. It was played by the champions of both leagues, Boca Juniors (Primera División of dissident league Asociación Amateurs de Football), and Tiro Federal (Liga Rosarina de Football), crowned during 1920.

After the first match (where Boca Juniors had won 2–1) was annulled, Tiro Federal beat Boca Juniors 4–0 in the replay match at Boca Juniors Stadium.

== Qualified teams ==
Team	Qualification	Previous app.
Boca Juniors	1920 Primera División (AAmF) champion	(none)
Tiro Federal	1920 Liga Rosarina	(None)

- **Bold** indicates winning years

== Overview ==
Boca Juniors beat Tiro Federal 2–1 in the final held in Sportivo Barracas. However, the Liga Rosarina claimed that three Boca Juniors footballers had played for other teams during that season (which was forbidden). Players pointed were Américo Tesoriere (for Sportivo del Norte), Felipe Galíndez (for Sportivo Barracas), and Marcelino Martínez (for Vélez Sarsfield).

On August 24, the Association decided that the score stood, proclaiming Boca Juniors as winner. Nevertheless, the Martínez case was still in doubt. Finally, in October 1921 both clubs agreed to replay the match. The Association accept that gentleman's agreement.

== Match details ==
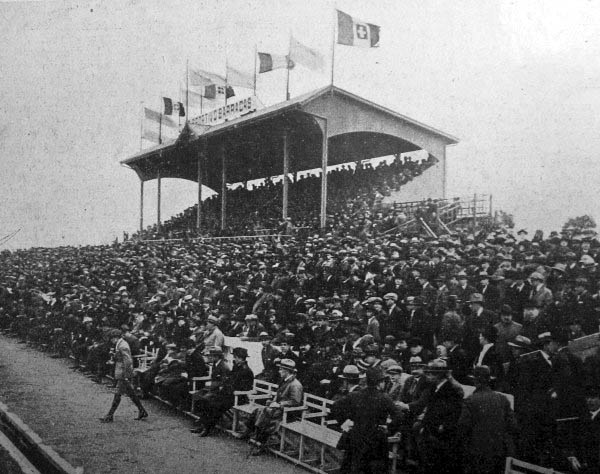
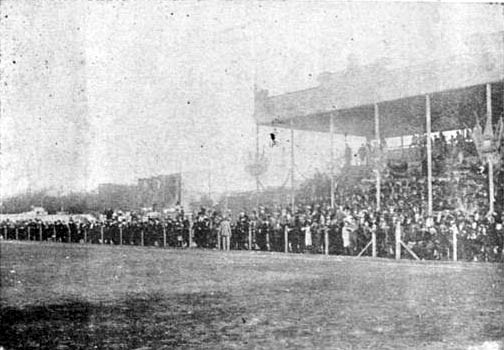
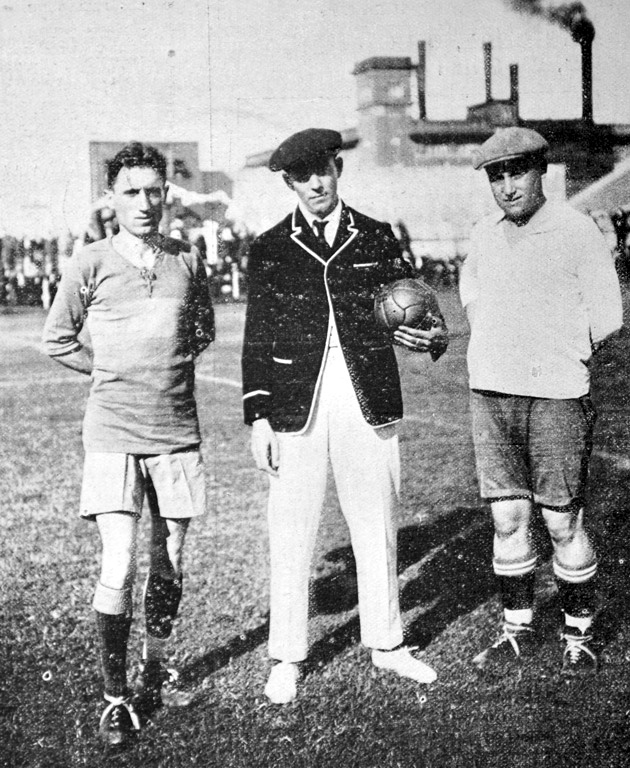
(Left): Sportivo Barracas, venue; (center): Boca Juniors, rematch venue; (right): Pedro Calomino, Servando Pérez (referee), and Lorenzo Colombo (TF) before the rematch

=== Final ===
1920 Copa Ibarguren
1 June 1921

Boca Juniors	2–1	Tiro Federal
Calomino 5'; Galíndez 52'	Report	Waelkens 11'

Estadio Sportivo Barracas, Buenos Aires
Referee: Gerónimo Repossi.

**Boca Juniors**	**Tiro Federal**

GK	(Argentina) Américo Tesoriere
DF	(Argentina) Antonio Cortella
DF	(Argentina) Víctorio Capelletti
MF	(Argentina) José A. López
MF	(Argentina) Mario Busso
MF	(Argentina) Alfredo Elli
FW	(Argentina) Pedro Calomino
FW	(Argentina) Pablo Bosso
FW	(Argentina) Alberto Martín
FW	(Argentina) Felipe Galíndez
FW	(Argentina) Marcelino Martínez

GK	(Argentina) Lorenzo Colombo
DF	(Argentina) Roberto Cochrane
DF	(Argentina) Juan Cochrane
MF	(Argentina) Antonio Rezzoagli
MF	(Argentina) Victorio Faggiani
MF	(Argentina) Ernesto Faggiani
FW	(Argentina) Eduardo Bonzi
FW	(Argentina) Justo Romero
FW	(Argentina) Gerardo Waelkens
FW	(Argentina) Carlos Guidi
FW	(Argentina) Celestino López

=== Rematch ===
1920 Copa Ibarguren
5 February 1922

Boca Juniors	0–4	Tiro Federal
	Report	Waelkens 5'; Podestá 10', 17'; J. Cochrane 75' (pen.)

Boca Junior Stadium, Buenos Aires
Referee: Servando Pérez

**Boca Juniors**	**Tiro Federal**

GK	(Argentina) Rosario Galeano
DF	(Argentina) Domingo Costa
DF	(Argentina) Sebastián Fabiano
MF	(Argentina) Juan B. Mainardi
MF	(Argentina) Mario Busso
MF	(Argentina) Alfredo Elli
FW	(Argentina) Pedro Calomino
FW	(Argentina) Juan Pissa
FW	(Argentina) Pablo Bosso
FW	(Argentina) Leonardo Fabiano
FW	(Argentina) Antonio Sánchez

GK	(Argentina) Lorenzo Colombo
DF	(Argentina) Roberto Cochrane
DF	(Argentina) Ernesto Faggiani
MF	(Argentina) Antonio Rezzoagli
MF	(Argentina) Victorio Faggiani
MF	(Argentina) Juan E. Cochrane
FW	(Argentina) Eduardo Bonzi
FW	(Argentina) José Podestá
FW	(Argentina) Justo Romero
FW	(Argentina) Gerardo Waelkens
FW	(Argentina) Celestino López
