= Walter Gómez =

Uruguayan footballer (1927-2004)

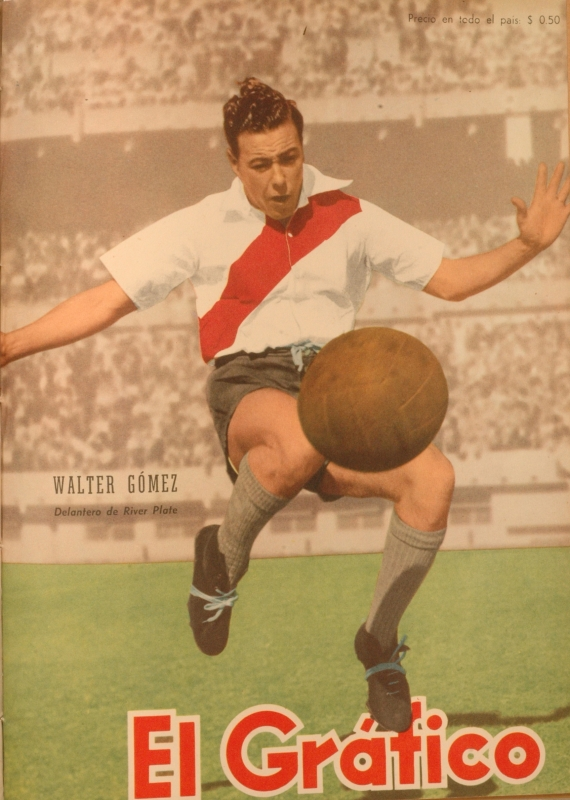
- Gómez playing for River Plate in 1950.

Personal information
- Date of birth: 12 December 1927
- Place of birth: Montevideo, Uruguay
- Date of death: 4 March 2004 (aged 76)
- Place of death: Vicente López, Argentina
- Position: Inside forward

Senior career*
Years	Team	Apps	(Gls)
1944–1945	Central Español	37	(21)
1946–1949	Nacional	88	(54)
1950–1955	River Plate	140	(76)
1956–1958	Palermo	48	(8)
1959	Cúcuta		
1960–1961	Once Caldas		
1963–1964	Deportivo Galicia		

International career
1945–1946	Uruguay	4	(0)
- * Club domestic league appearances and goals

Walter Gómez Pardal (12 December 1927 – 4 March 2004) was a Uruguayan footballer who played as a forward in the 1940s and 1950s. Throughout his career, he played for Club Nacional de Football and Club Atlético River Plate.

Gomez was a member of the outstanding Nacional side of the late 1940s, and he scored more than 100 goals for the club before moving to River Plate. That meant the end of his international career with Uruguay as only players within the domestic league could be picked for the Celestes. Gomez had made his international debut in 1945, at the age of just 18, but despite his talent he played only four times for the national team and never scored in international football.

At River he went on to win three league titles, and formed a new La Máquina side following the great team of the early 1940s.

Gomez played as a "media-punta" (second striker) at River alongside Ángel Labruna and Félix Loustau. At the end of his career at River he played with Omar Sívori. Such was the widespread admiration of the Uruguayan inside forward that in those times the saying "La gente ya no come para ver a Walter Gómez" became a popular theme in Buenos Aires.
