= 1923 Copa Ibarguren =

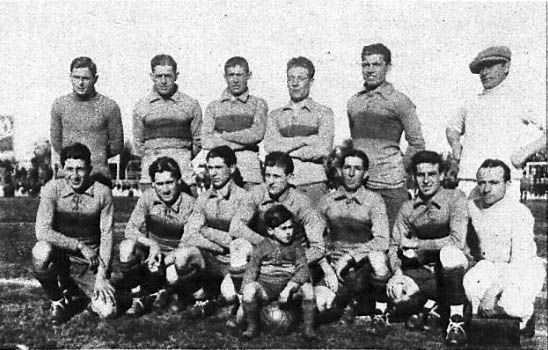
- Boca Juniors, winner
Boca Juniors	Rosario Central
1	0
- Date: June 8, 1924; 101 years ago
- Venue: Sportivo Barracas, Buenos Aires
- Referee: Jerónimo Repossi

The 1923 Copa Ibarguren was the eleventh edition of this National cup of Argentina. It was played by the champions of both leagues, Primera División and Liga Rosarina de Football crowned during 1923.

Boca Juniors (Primera División champion) faced Rosario Central (Liga Rosarina champion) at Sportivo Barracas Stadium. Although they had won their league titles in 1923, the final was played in 1924.

== Qualified teams ==
Team	Qualification	Previous appearances
Boca Juniors	1923 Primera División champion	**1919**, 1920
Rosario Central	1923 Copa Vila champion	1914, **1915**, 1916, 1917, 1919

Note

- **Bold** indicates winning years

== Match details ==
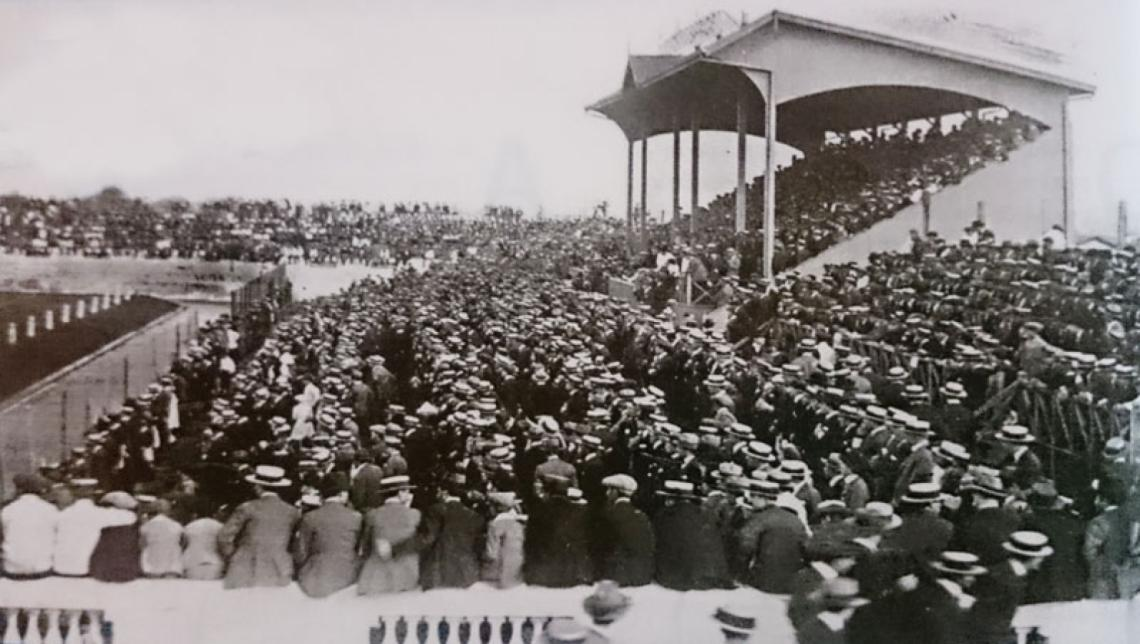
Sportivo Barracas, venue

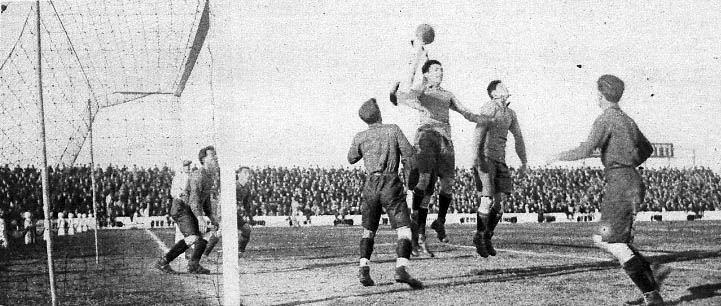
A moment of the match

1923 Copa Ibarguren
8 Jun 1924

Boca Juniors	1–0 (a.e.t.)	Rosario Central
Pertini 116'	Report

Estadio Sportivo Barracas
Referee: Jerónimo Repossi

**Boca Juniors**	**Rosario Central**

GK	(Argentina) Américo Tesoriere
DF	(Argentina) Ludovico Bidoglio
DF	(Argentina) Ramón Muttis
MF	(Argentina) Ángel Médici
MF	(Argentina) Cayetano Corvetto
MF	(Argentina) Alfredo Elli
FW	(Argentina) Pedro Calomino
FW	(Argentina) Antonio Cerrotti
FW	(Argentina) Domingo Tarasconi
FW	(Argentina) Carmelo Pozzo
FW	(Argentina) Dante Pertini

GK	Octavio Díaz
DF	O. Montiquín
DF	Florencio Sarasíbar
MF	Félix Sarasibar
MF	D. Izaga
MF	Jacinto Perazzo
FW	A. Mascias
FW	D. Arias
FW	Harry Hayes
FW	L. Indaco
FW	B. Debenedetti
