= Estadio Ministro Brin y Senguel =

Defunct football stadium in Buenos Aires, Argentina

Ministro Brin y Senguel Stadium
- Estadio Ministro Brin y Senguel
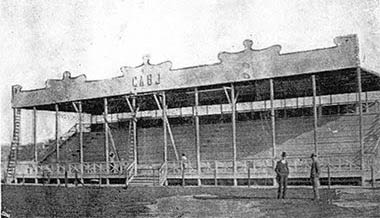
- Official grandstand, c. 1919
- Interactive map of Ministro Brin y Senguel Stadium
- Address: Ministro Brin and Senguel streets
- Location: La Boca, Buenos Aires
- Owner: Boca Juniors
- Operator: Boca Juniors
- Seating type: Hard
- Capacity: 25,000
- Surface: Grass
- Field size: 105 by 68 metres (114.8 yd × 74.4 yd)

Construction
- Opened: 25 May 1916
- Closed: 1924; 102 years ago
- Demolished: 1925

Tenant
- Boca Juniors (1916–24)

Estadio Ministro Brin y Senguel was a football stadium in La Boca district of Buenos Aires, Argentina. It was the home ground of Club Atlético Boca Juniors until the club moved to Brandsen and Del Crucero (current Del Valle Iberlucea) streets in 1924.

Giving the stadiums the names of the streets where they were located in was a common practise in those times. It was owned by club Boca Juniors when the club returned to La Boca in 1916. The club used the stadium until 1924, when it moved to a new venue on Brandsen and Del Crucero (currently Del Valle Iberlucea) streets.

== History ==
The stadium was inaugurated on May 25, 1916, when Boca Juniors played a friendly match vs. Gimnasia y Esgrima de Buenos Aires. (Note: Gimansia y Esgrima (mostly known for its acronym "GEBA" had a football team playing in the Argentine Primera División. The club disaffiliated from the Argentine Association in 1920.) That match was not only the first game in that venue but the return of Boca Juniors to the neighborhood that had seen its birth in 1905.

The only Superclásico vs River Plate played at that venue was on July 27, 1919. The match (ended 0–0) would be later annulled by the Association due to the schism that caused the creation of dissident body "Asociación Amateurs de Football".

On June 15, 1924, Boca Juniors played its last match in Ministro Brin and Senguel when the squad beat Sportivo Barracas 3–1 in the 1924 domestic championship.

With Ministro Brin and Senguel as home venue, Boca Juniors won four league, 2 national cups and two international cups, a total of 8 titles.

=== Other events ===
The first recorded women's football match in Argentina was played on 13 October 1923 at Estadio Ministro Brin y Senguel. Teams were named Argentinas and Cosmopolitas and 6,000 spectators attended. Argentinas won 4–3. Chronicles of the match were published by newspapers La Vanguardia and Crítica.

== Bibliography ==
- David Goldblatt; World Soccer Yearbook; 2002 ISBN 0-7894-8943-0
