= 1919 Copa Ibarguren =

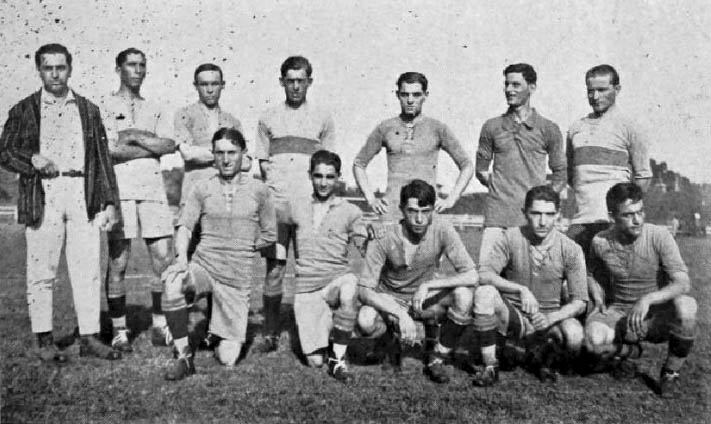
- A Boca Juniors team of 1920
Boca Juniors	Rosario Central
1	0
- Date: February 8, 1920; 106 years ago
- Venue: Estadio GEBA, Buenos Aires
- Referee: P. Novarino

The 1919 Copa Ibarguren was the seventh edition of this National cup of Argentina. It was played by the champions of both leagues, Primera División and Liga Rosarina de Football crowned during 1919.

Boca Juniors (Primera División champion) faced Rosario Central (Liga Rosarina champion) at Gimnasia y Esgrima de Buenos Aires stadium. Boca Juniors won 1–0 with goal by Miranda.

== Qualified teams ==
Team	Qualification	Previous appearances
Boca Juniors	1919 Primera División champion	(none)
Rosario Central	1919 Copa Nicasio Vila champion	1914, **1915**, 1916, 1917

Note

- **Bold** indicates winning years

== Match details ==
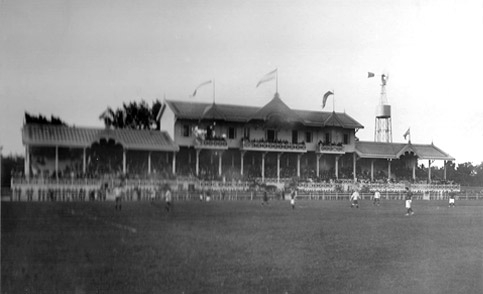
GEBA Stadium, venue

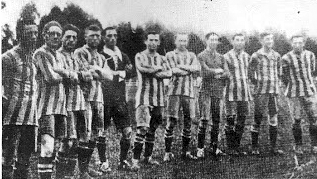
A Rosario Central team of 1920

1919 Copa Ibarguren
8 Feb 1920

Boca Juniors	1–0	Rosario Central
Miranda 10'	Report

Gimnasia y Esgrima Stadium
Referee: P. Novarino

**Boca Juniors**	**Rosario Central**

GK	(Argentina) Américo Tesoriere
DF	(Argentina) Antonio Cortella
DF	(Argentina) José Ortega
MF	(Argentina) José A. López
MF	(Argentina) Mario Busso
MF	(Argentina) Alfredo Elli
FW	(Argentina) Pedro Calomino
FW	(Argentina) Pablo Bosso
FW	(Argentina) Alfredo Garasini
FW	(Argentina) Alberto Martín
FW	(Argentina) Pedro Miranda

GK	Octavio Díaz
DF	Patricio Clarke
DF	Florencio Sarasíbar
MF	Rodolfo Mulhall
MF	Patricio Furlong
MF	Jacinto Perazzo
FW	Ernesto Guaraglia
FW	Antonio Blanco
FW	Harry Hayes
FW	Ennis Hayes
FW	Antonio Miguel
