= 1918 Copa Ibarguren =

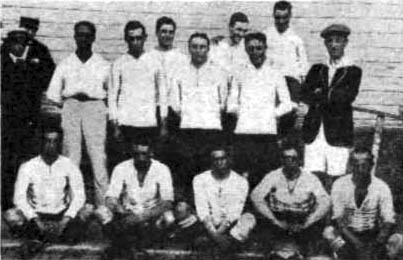
- Racing Club, champions
Racing	Newell's Old Boys
4	0
- Date: November 24, 1918; 107 years ago
- Venue: Estadio GEBA, Buenos Aires
- Referee: E. Palma

The 1918 Copa Ibarguren was the sixth edition of the national cup of Argentina. It was played by the champions of the two leagues, Primera División and Liga Rosarina de Football in 1918.

Racing (Primera División champion) faced Newell's Old Boys (Liga Rosarina champion) in a match in Gimnasia y Esgrima Stadium in Palermo, on November 24, 1918. Racing won 4–0 achieving its fifth Ibarguren trophy in six years.

== Qualified teams ==
Team	Qualification	Previous appearances
Racing	1918 Primera División champion	**1913, 1914**, 1915, **1916, 1917**
Newell's Old Boys	1918 Copa Nicasio Vila champion	1913

Note

- **Bold** indicates winning years

== Match details ==
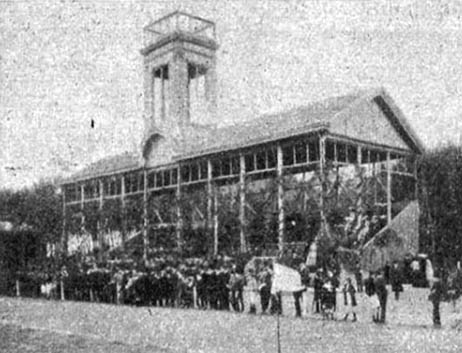
GEBA Stadium, venue

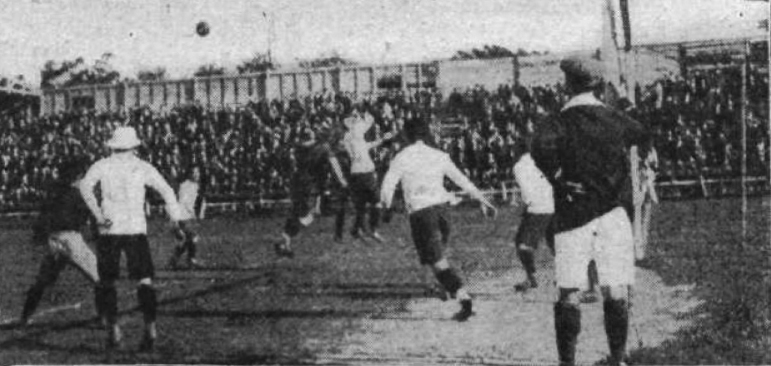
A moment of the match

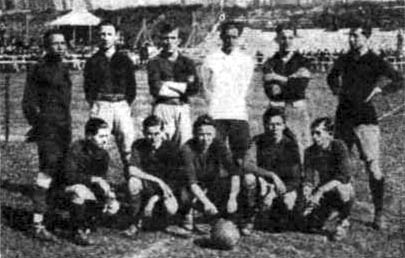
Newell's Old Boys team

1918 Copa Ibarguren
24 November 1918

Racing	4–0	Newell's Old Boys
Vivaldo 19'; N. Perinetti 28', 73'; Zavaleta 66'	Report

Estadio GEBA, Buenos Aires
Referee: E. Palma

**Racing**	**Newell's**

GK	(Argentina) Marcos Crocce
DF	(Argentina) Roberto Castagnola
DF	(Argentina) Armando Reyes
MF	(Argentina) Alberto Ohaco
MF	(Argentina) Alberto Marcovecchio
MF	(Argentina) Enrique Macchiavello
FW	(Argentina) Natalio Perinetti
FW	(Argentina) Albérico Zabaleta
FW	(Argentina) Nicolás Vivaldo
FW	(Argentina) Juan Hospital
FW	(Argentina) Juan Perinetti

GK	(Argentina) José Airaldi
DF	(Argentina) Bartolo Monserrat
DF	(Argentina) Adolfo Celli
MF	(Argentina) Alfonso Grenón
MF	(Argentina) Ernesto Celli
MF	(Argentina) Cayetano Blotta
FW	(Argentina) Julio Libonatti
FW	(Argentina) Salvador Juanto
FW	(Argentina) Atilio Badalini
FW	(Argentina) Blas Saruppo
FW	(Argentina) Juan Francia
