= Copa Presidente de la Nación =

Soccer championship between regional leagues of Argentina

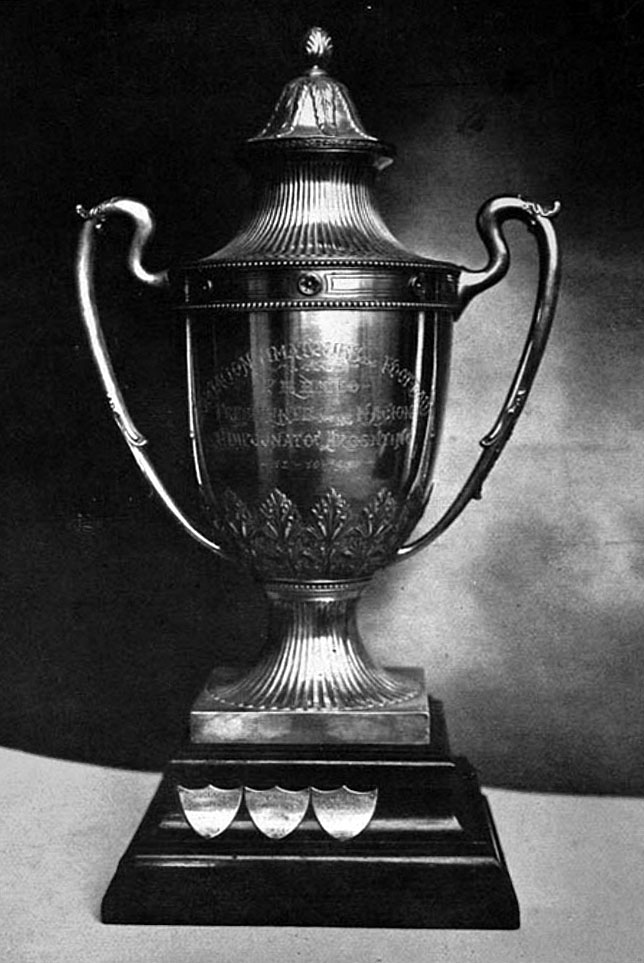
- The trophy awarded to champions
- Organiser(s): AAmF (1920–26); AFA (1927–89)
- Founded: 1920
- Abolished: 1989; 37 years ago
- Region: Argentina
- Related competitions: Regional leagues
- Last champions: Asociación Rosarina (1988-89)
- Most championships: Federación Tucumana (8 titles)

The Copa Presidente de la Nación, also known as Campeonato Argentino Interligas, was an official Argentine football cup competition established by dissident body Asociación Amateurs de Football in 1920. After the AAmF dissolved, the competition continued being organised by current Argentine Football Association, although the body has not officially included this competition in its list of national cups yet.

== History ==
Teams from regional leagues of Argentina took part of the tournament. The champion was awarded the trophy, donated by then President of Argentina, Hipólito Yrigoyen. From 1925, the runner-up was awarded with "Copa Intendente Municipal de la Ciudad de Buenos Aires" trophy while the "Copa Comité Olímpico Argentino" trophy was given to the team placed third (from 1929). Another trophy, the "Copa Adrián Beccar Varela" (not to be confused with Copa Beccar Varela) trophy was awarded to the best team outside Buenos Aires.

Between 1942 and 1958, the champion qualified to play Copa Ibarguren facing the Primera División champion.

In the 1956-57 edition, the champion was eligible to play the "Copa Carlos Bottaro" vs. the Uruguay regional leagues champion.

By mid 1970s, the Copa Presidente de la Nación lost interest due to the addition of teams indirectly affiliated to AFA to the Primera División tournaments, with the establishment of both, Torneo Nacional in 1967 and Primera B Nacional in 1986. The Copa Presidente de la Nación last edition was held in 1988-89. Since then, only youth teams have played the tournament.

== List of champions ==
Ref:

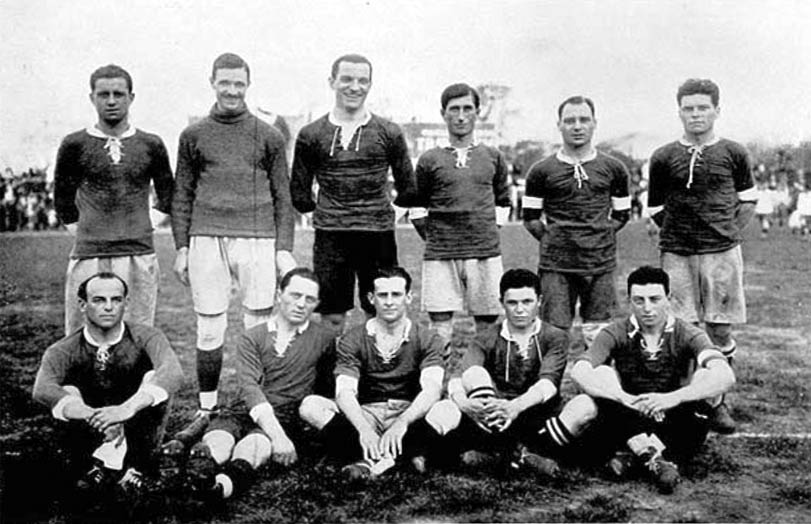
Team of Asociación Amateurs (Provincia), champion of 1924

Year	Champion	Province
1920	Asociación Amateurs	Buenos Aires
1921	Asociación Amateurs	Buenos Aires
1922	Asociación Amateurs (Capital) (Note: From the city of Buenos Aires (metropolitan area).)	Buenos Aires
1923	Asociación Amateurs	Buenos Aires
1924	Asociación Amateurs (Provincia) (Note: From the Buenos Aires Province.)	Buenos Aires
1925	Asociación Amateurs (Capital)	Buenos Aires
1926	Asociación Amateurs (Provincia)	Buenos Aires
1927	AFA (Provincia)	Buenos Aires
1928	Liga Cultural	Sgo. del Estero
1929	Liga Rosarina	Santa Fe
1930	AFA (Provincia)	Buenos Aires
1931	Federación Deportiva (Bolívar)	Buenos Aires
1932–35	AFA (Capital)	Buenos Aires
1936–37	AFA (Provincia)	Buenos Aires
1938	(Abandoned)	
1940	AFA (Capital)	Buenos Aires
1942	Liga Cordobesa	Córdoba
1944	Federación Tucumana	Tucumán
1946	Federación Tucumana	Tucumán
1948–49	Federación Tucumana	Tucumán
1950	Liga Mendocina	Mendoza
1952	Liga Cultural	Sgo. del Estero
1954	Federación Tucumana	Tucumán
1956–57	Liga Sanjuanina	San Juan
1958	Liga Cordobesa	Córdoba
1960	Federación Tucumana	Tucumán
1961	Liga del Sur (Bahía Blanca)	Buenos Aires
1962	Liga Cordobesa	Córdoba
1963	Federación Tucumana	Tucumán
1964	Liga Sanjuanina	San Juan
1966	Liga Sanjuanina	San Juan
1968	Liga Chaqueña	Chaco
1970	Liga Marplatense	Buenos Aires
1973	Liga Regional (Río Cuarto)	Córdoba
1975–76	Liga Tucumana	Tucumán
1977–78	Liga Sanjuanina	San Juan
1979–80	Liga Cordobesa	Córdoba
1982	Liga de Fútbol de Olavarría	Buenos Aires
1984	Liga Tucumana	Tucumán
1986–87	Asociación Rosarina	Santa Fe
1988–89	Asociación Rosarina	Santa Fe

== Titles by league ==
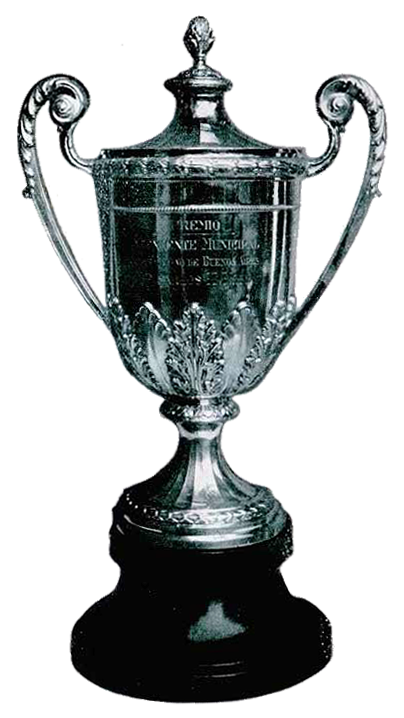
The "Copa Intendente Municipal Ciudad de Buenos Aires" was the trophy awarded to runner-up.

Team	Titles
Liga Tucumana	8
Liga Cordobesa	4
Liga Sanjuanina	4
Asociación Amateurs	3
AFA (Provincia)	3
Liga Rosarina	3
Asociación Amateurs (Provincia)	2
Asociación Amateurs (Capital)	2
AFA (Capital)	2
Liga Santiagueña	2
Liga Deportiva (Bolívar)	1
Liga Marplatense	1
Liga del Sur (Bahía Blanca)	1
Liga Mendocina	1
Liga de Olavarría	1
Liga Chaqueña	1
Liga Regional (Río Cuarto)	1
