= Copa Nicasio Vila =

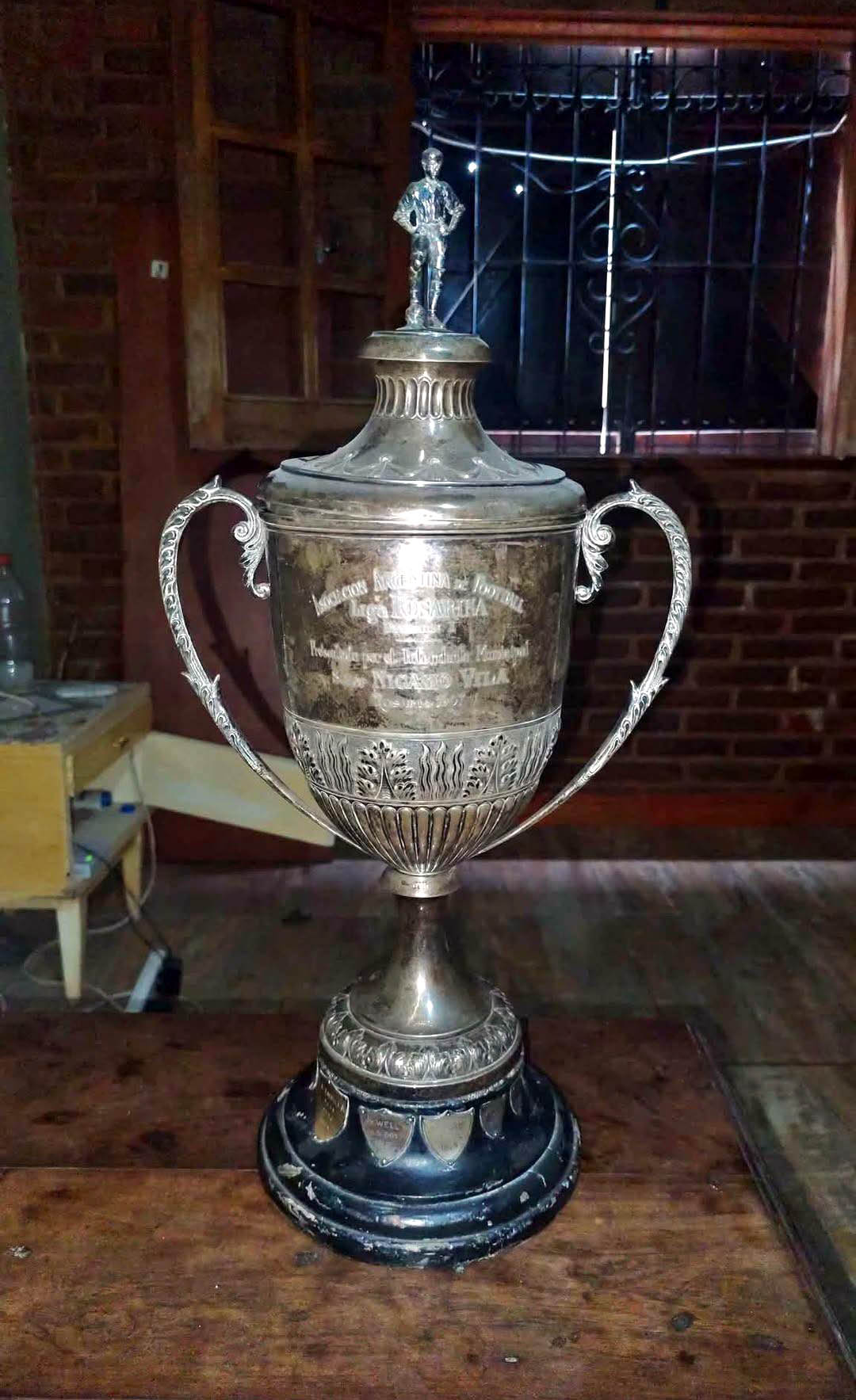
- The trophy awarded to champions
- Founded: 1907
- Abolished: 1930; 95 years ago
- Region: Rosario, Argentina
- Number of teams: 12 (as of 1930)
- Qualifier for: Copa Dr. Carlos Ibarguren
- Related competitions: Copa Santiago Pinasco
- Last champions: Rosario Central (1930)
- Most successful club(s): Rosario Central (10)

The Copa Nicasio Vila was an official Argentine football cup competition organised by Liga Rosarina de Football. The "Copa Vila" was the top football division in Rosario, being held between 1907 and 1930, when it was replaced by Torneo Gobernador Luciano Molinas.

Rosario Central is the most winning team of Copa Nicasio Vila with 10 titles.

== History ==
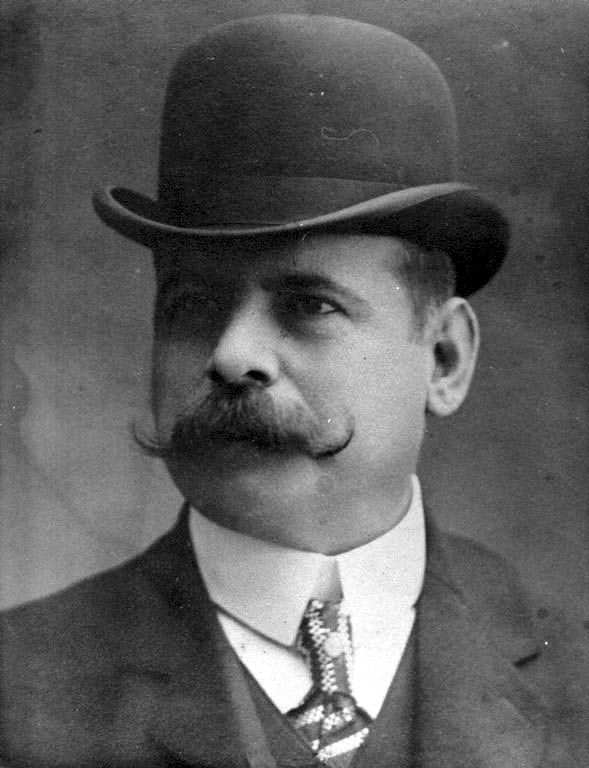
Nicasio Vila, Mayor of Rosario, donated the cup

Due to the increasing popularity of football in Argentina –being the city of Rosario among them–, the body established a first division championship, named "Copa Nicasio Vila", named after then major of Rosario, local entrepreneur Nicasio Vila, whose first edition was won by Newell's.

Some of the clubs that took part of the competition were Rosario Central, Newell's Old Boys, Tiro Federal, Central Córdoba, Atlético Argentino (now Gimnasia y Esgrima de Rosario), Nacional (now Argentino de Rosario), Provincial, Belgrano, Sparta, Calzada, Estudiantes, Atlantic Sportsmen, Riberas del Paraná, Washington, among others

The competition was in a hiatus in 1912 because of a conflict between some clubs and Liga Rosarina therefore the competition was not held that season. The 1913 edition was organised by recently created Federación Rosarina, until 1914, when FRF and LRF merged and the championship was held again.

The winner of Copa Nicasio Vila qualified to play the Copa Dr. Carlos Ibarguren against the champion of the Buenos Aires League (that represented the AFA First Division). The champion and the 2nd., 3rd., and 4th. were also qualified to play other AFA national cups, such as the Copa de Competencia and Copa de Honor.

The competition was last held in 1930, shortly before football became professional in Argentina. A new Association (Asociación Rosarina de Fútbol) was created one year later. The Rosarian first division championship continued under the name "Torneo Gobernador Luciano Molinas" in honor of the Governor of Santa Fe Province elected in 1932. A new trophy was designed for the occasion, being awarded since then.

== List of Champions ==
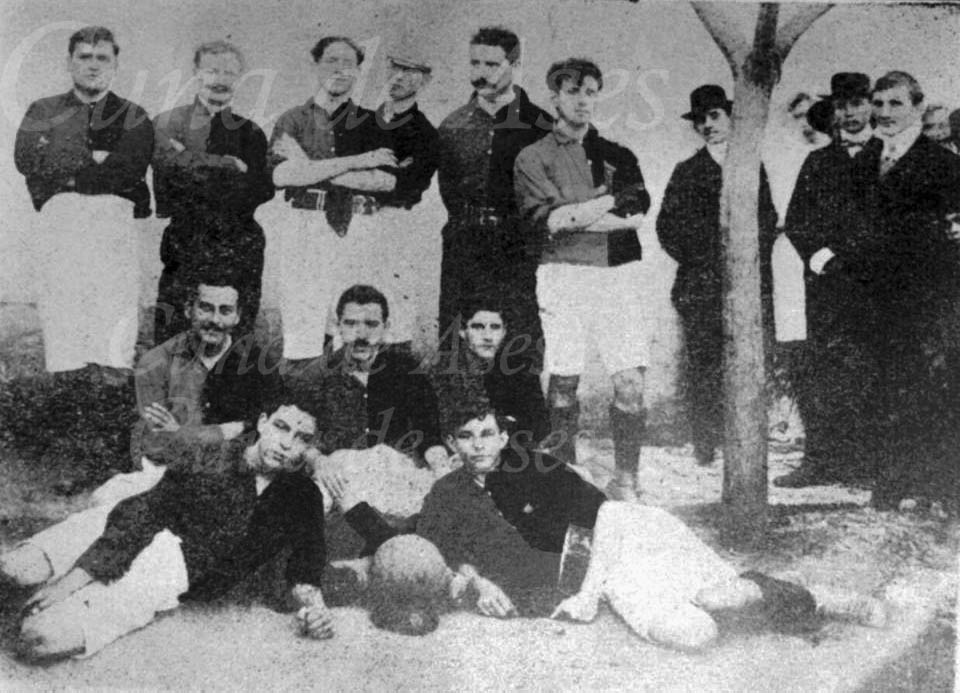
Team of Newell's of 1907, first champion of Copa Vila

Ed.	Year	Champion
1	1907	Newell's Old Boys (1)
2	1908	Rosario Central (1)
3	1909	Newell's Old Boys (2)
4	1910	Newell's Old Boys (3)
5	1911	Newell's Old Boys (4)
6	1912	(not finished)
7	1913	Newell's Old Boys (5)
8	1914	Rosario Central (2)
9	1915	Rosario Central (3)
10	1916	Rosario Central (4)
11	1917	Rosario Central (5)
12	1918	Newell's Old Boys (6)
13	1919	Rosario Central (6)
14	1920	Tiro Federal (1)
15	1921	Newell's Old Boys (7)
16	1922	Newell's Old Boys (8)
17	1923	Rosario Central (7)
18	1924	Belgrano (1)
19	1925	Tiro Federal (2)
20	1926	Tiro Federal (3)
21	1927	Rosario Central (8)
22	1928	Rosario Central (9)
23	1929	Newell's Old Boys (9)
24	1930	Rosario Central (10)

== Titles by club ==
Team	Titles	Winning years
Rosario Central	10	1908, 1914, 1915, 1916, 1917, 1919, 1923, 1927, 1928, 1930
Newell's Old Boys	9	1907, 1909, 1910, 1911, 1913, 1918, 1921, 1922, 1929
Tiro Federal	3	1920, 1925, 1926
Belgrano de Rosario	1	1924
