= 1916 Copa Ibarguren =

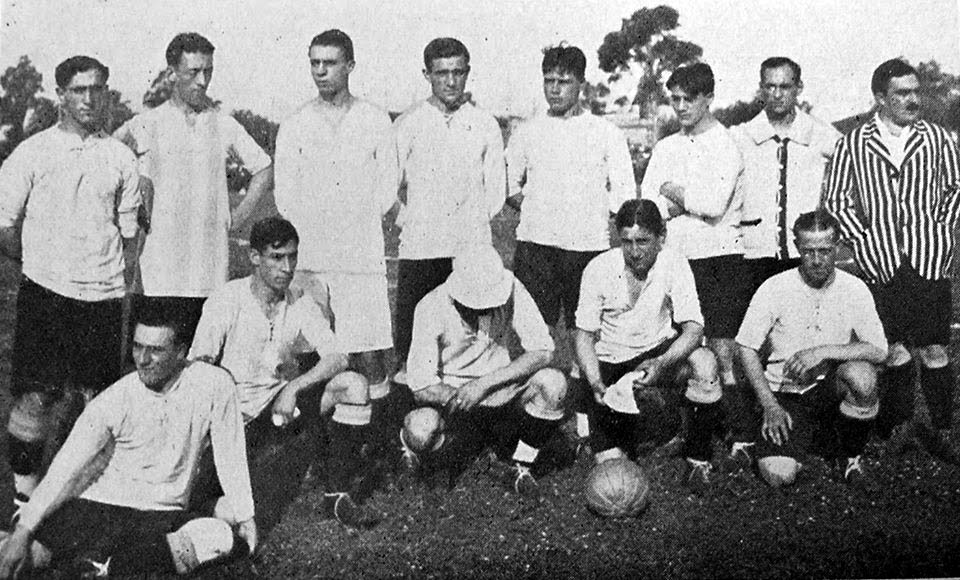
- A Racing team of 1916
Racing	Rosario Central
6	0
- Date: December 30, 1916; 109 years ago
- City: Avellaneda
- Referee: A. Rolón

The 1916 Copa Ibarguren was the fourth edition of this National cup of Argentina. It was played by the champions of both leagues, Primera División and Liga Rosarina de Football crowned during 1916.

Racing (Primera División champion) faced Rosario Central (Liga Rosarina champion) at its own venue, Estadio Racing Club, located on Alsina and Colón streets in Avellaneda. Racing thrashed Rosario Central 6–0.

== Qualified teams ==
Team	Qualification	Previous app.
Racing	1916 Primera División champion	**1913, 1914**, 1915
Rosario Central	1916 Copa Nicasio Vila champion	1914, **1915**

Note

- **Bold** indicates winning years

== Match details ==
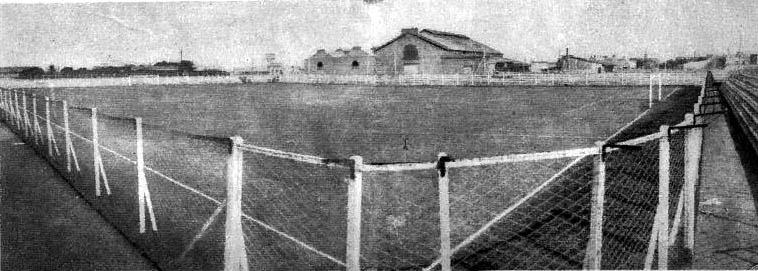
Racing Club stadium, venue

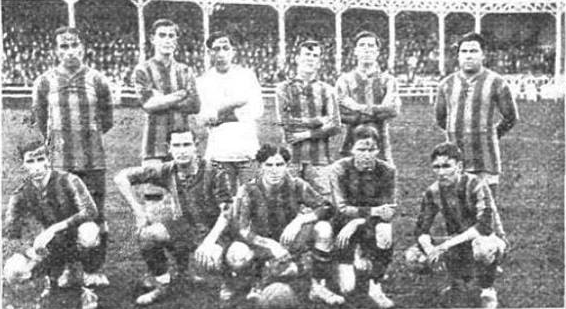
A Rosario Central team of 1916

1916 Copa Ibarguren
30 December 1916

Racing	6–0	Rosario Central
Hospital 30'; Marcovecchio 32'; Vivaldi 38', 75'; Canavery○ 83'; Olazar 88'	Report

Estadio Racing Club, Avellaneda
Referee: A. Rolón

**Racing**	**Rosario Central**

GK	(Argentina) Syla Arduino
DF	(Argentina) Alberto Ohaco
DF	(Argentina) Armando Reyes
MF	(Argentina) Juan Viazzi
MF	(Argentina) Francisco Olazar
MF	(Argentina) Ricardo Pepe
FW	(Uruguay) Zoilo Canavery
FW	(Argentina) Nicolás Vivaldo
FW	(Argentina) Alberto Marcovecchio
FW	(Argentina) Juan Hospital
FW	(Argentina) Juan Perinetti

GK	(Argentina) Guillermo Niblo
DF	(Argentina) Zenón Díaz
DF	(Argentina) Ignacio Rotta
MF	(Argentina) Ernesto Rigotti
MF	(Argentina) Ernesto Blanco
MF	(Argentina) Jacinto Perazzo
FW	(Argentina) Antonio Blanco
FW	(Argentina) José Laoilo
FW	(Argentina) Juan Enrique Hayes
FW	(Argentina) Ennis Hayes
FW	(Argentina) Fidel Ramírez
