= 1915 Copa Ibarguren =

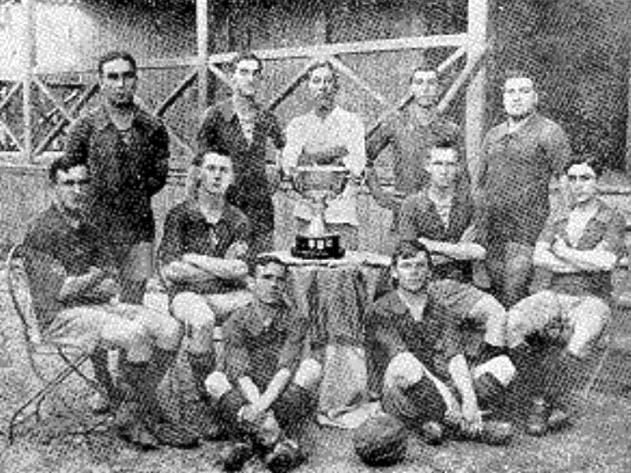
- Rosario Central, champions
Racing	Rosario Central
0	0
- Date: March 26, 1916; 110 years ago
- Venue: Independiente, Avellaneda
- Referee: Luis Gil

Playoff
Racing	Rosario Central
1	3
- Date: April 30, 1916; 110 years ago
- Venue: Gimnasia y Esgrima, Buenos Aires
- Referee: Luis Gil
- Attendance: 20.000

The 1915 Copa Ibarguren was the third edition of this National cup of Argentina. It was played by the champions of both leagues, Primera División and Liga Rosarina de Football crowned during 1915.

Racing (Primera División champion) faced Rosario Central (Liga Rosarina champion) at Independiente Stadium on Mitre Ave and Lacarra (known as La Crucecita) in Avellaneda, on March 26, 1916. After the match ended 0–0 and no goal was scored during the extra time, a playoff was scheduled for April 30 at Gimnasia y Esgrima de Buenos Aires Stadium.

In the playoff match, Rosario Central won 3–1 on extra time, achieving its second title in the first division.

== Qualified teams ==
Team	Qualification	Previous app.
Racing	1915 Primera División champion	**1913, 1914**
Rosario Central	1915 Copa Nicasio Vila champion	1914

Note

- **Bold** indicates winning years

== Match details ==
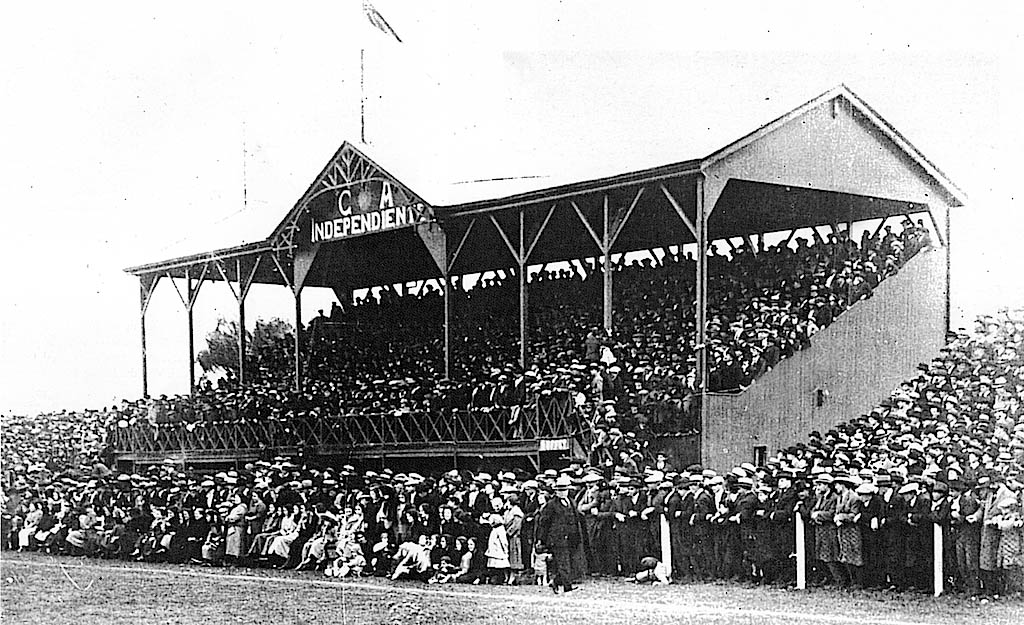
Independiente stadium, venue

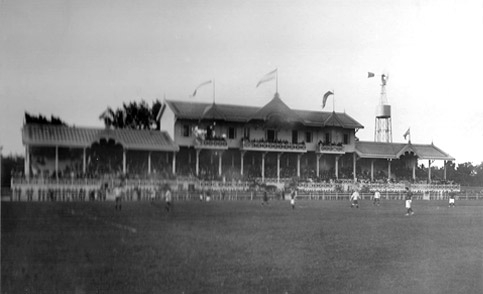
GEBA, playoff venue

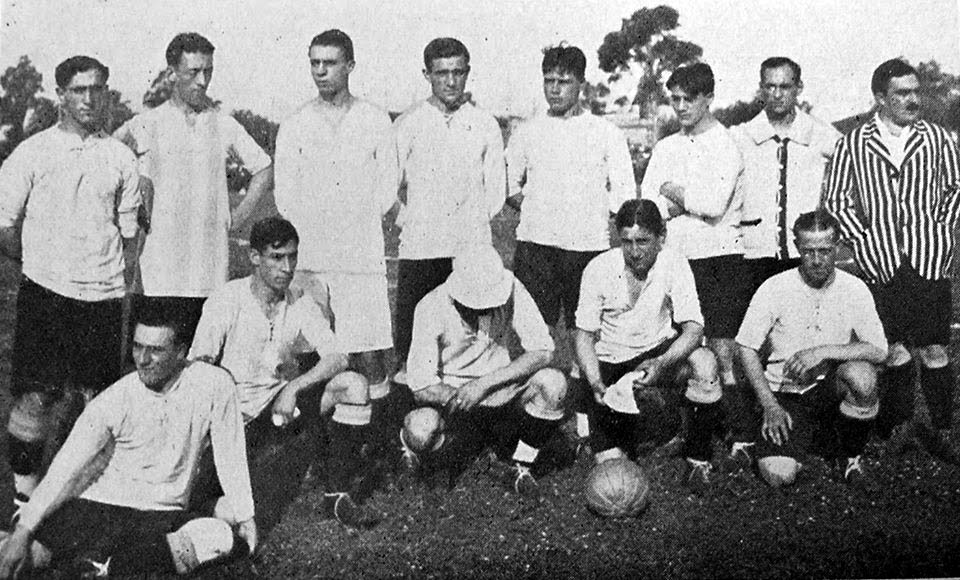
A Racing team of 1916

=== Final ===
1915 Copa Ibarguren
26 March 1916
Final

Racing	0–0 (a.e.t.)	Rosario Central
	Report

Independiente Stadium, Avellaneda
Referee: Luis Gil

=== Playoff ===
30 April 1916
Playoff

Racing	1–3 (a.e.t.)	Rosario Central
Vivaldo 15'	Report	Laiolo 11', 96'; Woodward 119'

Estadio GEBA, Buenos Aires
Attendance: 20.000
Referee: Luis Gil

**Racing**	**Rosario Central**

GK	(Argentina) Syla Arduino
DF	(Argentina) Ricardo Pepe
DF	(Argentina) Armando Reyes
MF	(Argentina) Ángel Betular
MF	(Argentina) Francisco Olazar
MF	(Argentina) Juan Viazzi
FW	(Uruguay) Zoilo Canavery
FW	(Argentina) Nicolás Vivaldo
FW	(Argentina) Alberto Ohaco
FW	(Argentina) Juan Hospital
FW	(Argentina) Juan Perinetti

GK	(Argentina) Ramón Moyano
DF	(Argentina) Zenón Díaz
DF	(Argentina) Ignacio Rotta
MF	(Argentina) Jacinto Perazzo
MF	(Argentina) Eduardo Blanco
MF	(Argentina) Ernesto Rigotti
FW	(Argentina) Mario Barberi
FW	(Argentina) Antonio Blanco
FW	(Argentina) José Laiolo
FW	(Argentina) Ennis Hayes
FW	(Argentina) Alfredo Woodward
