= Avellaneda derby =

Argentine football rivalry

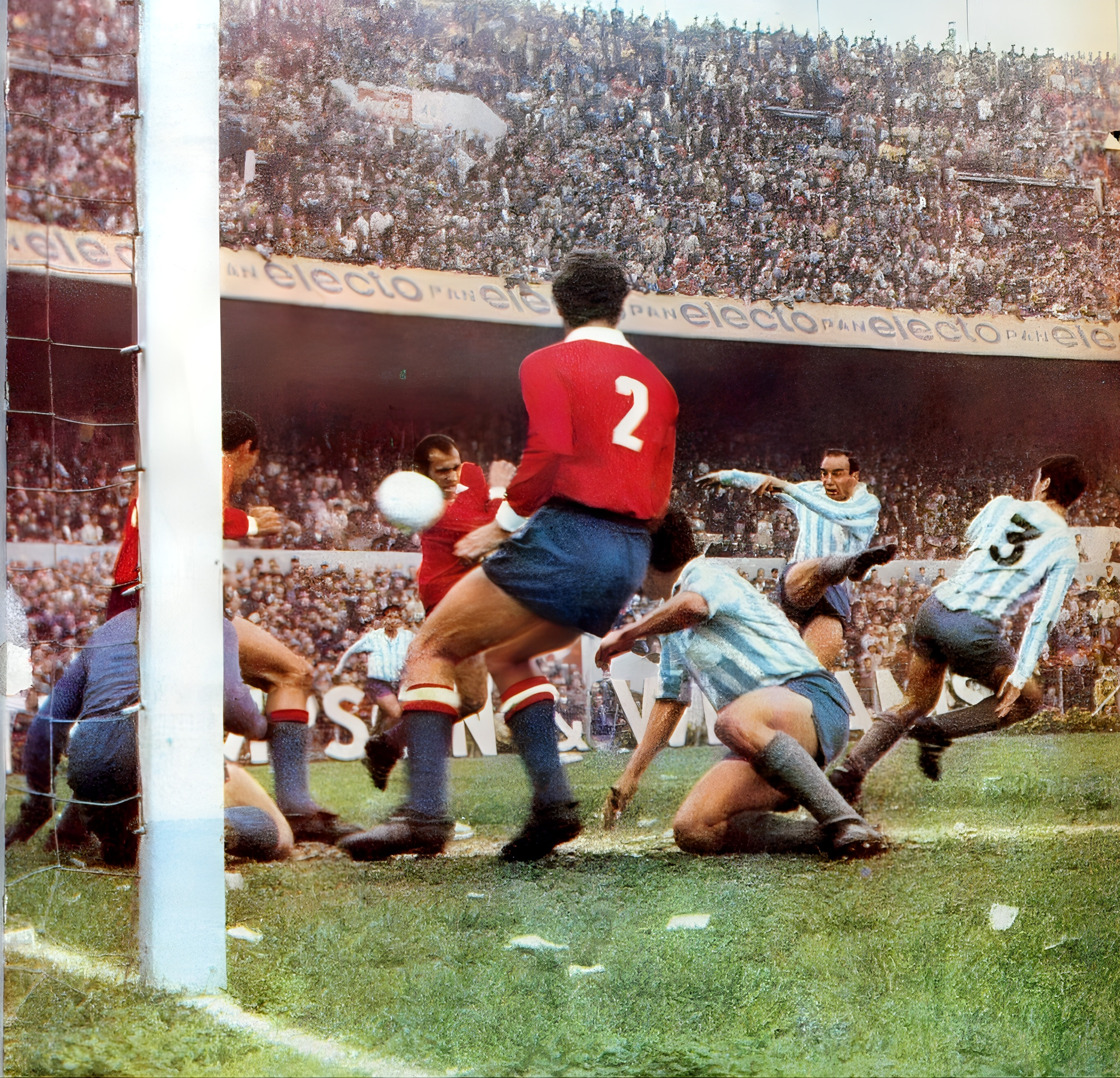
- 1968 Avellaneda derby

- Independiente Racing
- Sport: Football
- Location: Avellaneda
- First meeting: 9 June 1907 (Independiente 3–2 Racing)
- Latest meeting: 17 October 2026 (Racing 1–1 Independiente)
- Broadcasters: TNT Sports
- Stadiums: Libertadores de América (Independiente); El Cilindro (Racing)

Statistics
- Total meetings: 240
- Most wins: Independiente (89)
- Top scorer: Arsenio Erico (19)
- Largest victory: Independiente 7 – Racing 0 (3 Nov 1940)

The Avellaneda derby (Spanish: Clásico de Avellaneda) is the second-most important rivalry in Argentine football. It is contested between Independiente and Racing Club. Both clubs share a historic rivalry and reside in the Avellaneda city, one few cities of Argentina with one or more FIFA Club World champions.

It is the second-most important local derby, behind the Superclásico contested between Boca Juniors and River Plate, which are both based in the city of Buenos Aires. The Avellaneda derby is a major football rivalry. Both teams are very popular in Argentina, and are two of the "five big teams of Argentinian football."

== History ==
Both clubs were founded in the early years of the 20th century, Racing on 25 March 1903 and Independiente on 1 January 1905. Independente were founded in Buenos Aires and moved to Avellaneda in 1907.

- The first encounter between Independiente and Racing (reserve teams) was on 9 June 1907, with Independiente winning 3–2 when both clubs were competing in lower divisions. Independiente wore a white with blue pocket shirt while Racing wore a squared pink and light blue shirt (both were their first official colours). Independiente and Racing senior squads played against for the first time in Segunda División in 1910. The match was won by Independiente 1–0.
- The first Primera División match was played on 12 December 1915 at Crucecita Stadium (Independiente's venue) where the local team won 2–1, but the result was overturned and Racing were awarded the victory. The two points from that game were enough for Racing to go on to win the 1915 championship.
- Racing Club dominated Argentine football during the 1910s, winning more titles than any other surviving team during those years; between 1913 and 1921 Racing won 20 titles to Independiente's 3 in the same period of time.
- Racing Club's dominance extended into the 1950s where they became the first team (in the professional era) to win three consecutive championships (1949, 1950 and 1951).
- In 1964, Independiente became the first Argentine team to win the Copa Libertadores.
- In 1967, Racing Club became the first Argentine club to win the Copa Intercontinental; this achievement marked the end of Racing Club's supremacy.
- Between 1972 and 1975, Independiente won an unprecedented four consecutive Copa Libertadores titles.
- In 1984, Independiente won their seventh Copa Libertadores, earning them the nickname "King of Cups."
- In 2001, Racing Club won the Apertura, their first league title in 35 years.
- The most recent local title earned by either of the two clubs was the 2018-19 Argentine Primera División, won by Racing Club.
- In 2017, Independiente won their second Copa Sudamericana, the last international title earned by either team.
- In 2019, Racing achieves its second local league in 5 years and the "champions trophy", a national cup.

=== Violence ===
The November 26, 1961, saw the most violent game between the two clubs, the referee was forced to suspend the game for 6 minutes due to fighting amongst the players. The referee eventually sent off 4 players from each team. The game ended in a 1–1 draw.

On August 13, 2006, the Avellaneda derby was abandoned after violence between the fans escalated out of control. Independiente were winning 2–0 in La Doble Visera when rioting started in the away stands. The Racing fans then started to attack the police, the game was eventually abandoned by referee Horacio Elizondo. The three points from the game were eventually awarded to Independiente.

== Stadiums ==
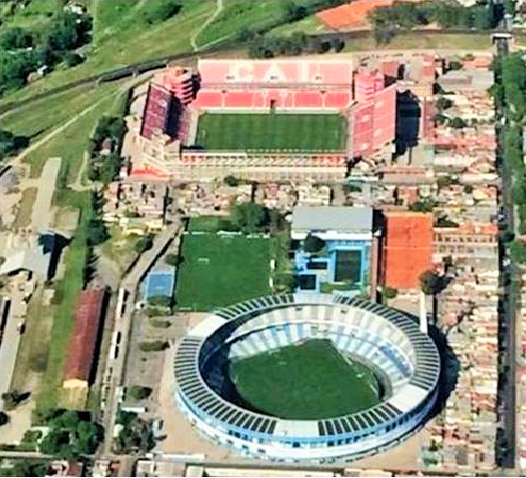
Independiente (above) and Racing stadiums, located less than 300 meters from each other

The two stadiums are only a few hundred metres apart. Independiente play at the Estadio Libertadores de América, commonly known as Libertadores de América; it was originally opened on 4 March 1928. Racing Club play at the Estadio Presidente Perón, commonly known as El Cilindro; it was opened on 3 September 1950.

== Statistics ==
=== Head-to-head ===
Matches record as of October 18, 2026:

Competition	M	IW	D	RW	IG	RG
Primera División	219	85	72	62	329	277
Segunda División	2	1	0	1	1	1
National Cups	17	4	6	7	17	21
International competitions	2	0	1	1	1	2
Total	240	90	79	71	348	301

=== Primera División matches ===
Complete list of games played in Primera División since the first derby of 1915:

#	Season	Round	Venue	Winner	Score	Goals (H)	Goals (A)
1	1915	21	Racing	Racing	1–0 (Note: Although Independiente had won 2–1, Racing appealed to the Association claiming that Independiente had registered a player who was not allowed to play. Finally the AFA accepted the request so Racing was awarded winner (1–0).)	Vivaldo	Zabaleta, Cappeletti
2	1916		Independiente	Racing	1–0		Olazar
3	1917		Independiente	Independiente	1–0	Siciliani	
4	1918		Independiente	Racing	2–0		Perinetti (2)
5	1919		Independiente	Racing	1–0		Marcovecchio
6	1920		Racing	Racing	1–0	Zabaleta	
7	1920		Independiente	Independiente	2–1	Ragoni (2)	Perinetti
8	1921		Independiente	(Draw)	1–1	Scoffano	Comaschi
9	1921		Racing	Racing	1–0	Zabaleta	
10	1922		Independiente	Racing	3–2	Seoane (2)	Zabaleta (2); Olazar
11	1922		Racing	Independiente	4–2	Rouco, Zabaleta	Seoane (2), López, Tubio
12	1923		Racing	Independiente	1–0		Tubio
13	1924		Independiente	Racing	1–0		Barceló
14	1925		Independiente	(Draw)	0–0		
15	1926		Racing	Independiente	3–1	Lucarelli	Ravaschino (2), Orsi
16	1927		Independiente	Independiente	7-4	Seoane (3), Ravaschino (2), Orsi, Lalín	Barañano (2), Dellatorre, García
17	1928		Independiente	Independiente	2-1	Seoane (2)	Perduca
18	1930		Independiente	Independiente	3-1	Ravaschino (2), Lalín	Mellone
19	1931	1	Independiente	Racing	1-4	Seoane	Devicenzi (2), Fassora (2)
20	1931	18	Racing	Racing	7-4	Del Giúdice (3), Mellone (2), Devincenzi, Fassora	Seoane, Porta, Cherro, Betinotti
21	1932	17	Racing	Independiente	2–0	Seoane, Sastre	
22	1932	34	Independiente	Racing	1–0		Fassora
23	1933	2	Racing	Racing	2-1	Barralía, Del Giúdice	Sastre
24	1933	19	Independiente	Independiente	2–1	Lamanna, Evaristo	Fassora
25	1934	2	Racing	Independiente	1–0	Alvarez	
26	1934	15	Independiente	Racing	3–1	Martínez	Del Giúdice, Barrera, Chazarreta
27	1934	32	Independiente	(Draw)	1–1	Valentini	Barrera
28	1935	5	Independiente	Independiente	2-0	Sastre, Mata	
29	1935	22	Racing	Independiente	3–1	Bugueyro	Erico (2), Martínez
30	1936	14	Independiente	Independiente	1–0 (Note: The match was 1–1 until it was suspended due to incidents. Independiente was proclaimed winner by the AFA.)	Erico	Barrera
31	1936	14	Racing	Racing	4-2	Barrera (2), Scopelli, Zito	Erico (2)
32	1937	17	Racing	Independiente	4–1	Guaita	Sastre (2), Reuben (2)
33	1937	35	Independiente	Independiente	3–1	Erico (2), Reuben	Zito
34	1938	10	Independiente	(Draw)	2–2	Erico (2)	Barrera, Zito
35	1938	27	Racing	Independiente	3–2	Fandiño	Erico (2), Zito, Zorrilla
36	1939	3	Racing	Racing	2–0	García, Benítez Cáceres	
37	1939	20	Independiente	(Draw)	3–3	Erico (2), Sastre	Benítez Cáceres), Coletta (own goal), García
38	1940	10	Racing	(Draw)	1–1	Devizia	De La Mata
39	1940	27	Independiente	Independiente	7-0	De La Mata (2), Erico (2), Zorrilla (2), Leguizamón	
40	1941	15	Independiente	Independiente	3-1	De la Mata, Erico, Funes	Liztherman
41	1941	30	Racing	Racing	3-1	Benítez Cáceres, Gumilla, Larretchart	Erico
42	1942	4	Racing	Independiente	2–1	Marvezi	De la Mata, Mourín
43	1942	19	Independiente	(Draw)	0–0		
44	1943	13	Independiente	Racing	21	De La Mata	D'Alessandro, Orleans
45	1943	28	Racing	(Draw)	2–2	D’Alessandro, Orleans	De La Mata, Walter
46	1944	11	Racing	Racing	4–2	Reyes (3), D'Alessandro	Erico, Paranza
47	1944	26	Independiente	Independiente	1-0	Walter	
48	1945	6	Racing	Independiente	2–0		Pedaci (2)
49	1945	21	Boca (Note: Independiente was the home team.)	Independiente	5–1	De La Mata (2), Cervino, Erico, Milone (own goal)	Castro
50	1946	13	Racing	Independiente	3–1	Strembel	Cervino (2), Bianco
51	1946	28	Independiente	Racing	2–0		Bravo, Sued
52	1947	13	Racing	Racing	3–2	Bravo (2), Di Pace	Deleva, M. Fernandez
53	1947	28	Independiente	Racing	2–1	O. Gil	Bravo, Gallo
54	1948	12	Independiente	Racing	3–2	M. Fernández (2)	Simes (2), N. Méndez
55	1948	27	San Lorenzo	Independiente	1–0		G. Gil
56	1949	10	Independiente	Racing	5–2	Romay (2)	D. Hernández, Gagliardo, Méndez, Simes
57	1949	27	Boca (Note: Racing was the home team.)	Racing	3–0	Méndez, Salvini, Simes	
58	1950	7	San Lorenzo	Racing	3–1	Bravo, Méndez, Simes	Lacasia
59	1950	24	Independiente	Racing	4–2	C. González, De La Mata	Bianco (3), Boyé
60	1951	10	Independiente	(Draw)	1–1	Romay	Ameal
61	1951	27	Racing	Racing	1-0	Simes	
62	1952	15	Independiente	(Draw)	1–1	Grillo	Cupo
63	1952	30	Racing	Racing	1–0	Simes	
64	1953	15	Racing	Racing	3-0	Pizzuti (2), Blanco	
65	1953	30	Independiente	Independiente	5–1	Grillo (3), Bonelli, Cruz, Pizzuti	
66	1954	4	Racing	Independiente	4–1	Simes	Micheli (2), Barraza, Grillo
67	1954	19	Independiente	Independiente	2–0	Barraza, Bonelli	
68	1955	6	Racing	(Draw)	1–1	Maschio	Grillo
69	1955	21	Independiente	Racing	1–0		Blanco
70	1956	4	Racing	Racing	2–0	Corbatta (2)	
71	1956	19	Independiente	(draw)	2–2	Grillo (2)	Corbatta, Mendiburu
72	1957	13	Racing	Independiente	3–2	Corbatta, Cupo	Bonelli (2), Miranda
73	1957	28	Independiente	(Draw)	2–2	Bendazzi, Raffo	Aguiar, Pizzuti
74	1958	3	Independiente	(Draw)	1–1	Nawacky	Sosa
75	1958	18	Racing	Racing	4–1	Manfredini (2), Corbatta, Pizzuti	Cruz
76	1959	14	Racing	Independiente	3–1	Corbatta	Jiménez (2), Carbone
77	1959	29	Independiente	Racing	4–3	Carbone (2), Villegas	Ferrero, Pizzuti, Sosa, Ferreiro (own goal)
78	1960	14	Independiente	(Draw)	3–3	D'Ascenzo (3)	Corbatta, Mansilla, Sosa
79	1960	29	Huracán	(Draw)	0–0		
80	1961	14	Independiente	Independiente	4–0	Lanzoni (2), Abeledo, Suárez	
81	1961	29	Racing	(Draw)	1–1	Belén	D'Ascenzo
82	1962	12	Racing	(Draw)	1–1	Belén, J. Ramírez	D'Ascenzo, Rolan
83	1962	27	Independiente	(Draw)	0–0		
84	1963	4	Racing	(Draw)	0–0		
85	1963	17	Independiente	Racing	4–0		San Lorenzo (2), Sosa (2)
86	1964	3	Independiente	Independiente	3-1	M. Rodríguez, Savoy, Suárez	Menotti
87	1964	18	Racing	Independiente	1–0		Suárez
88	1965	6	Independiente	(Draw)	2–2	Acevedo (2)	Cárdenas, Rulli
89	1965	23	Racing	Racing	2–0	Penterelli, J.J. Rodríguez	
90	1966	18	Independiente	Racing	2–0		Maschio, Martinoli
91	1966	37	Racing	(Draw)	3–3	Cárdenas, Martinoli, R. Díaz	Artime (2), Roldán
92	1967	Interzonal	Racing	Independiente	1–0		Tarabini
93	1967 Met	Interzonal	Independiente	Racing	3–0		Raffo (2), Maschio
94	1967 Met	Semifinal	Racing	Racing	2–0	Raffo (2)	
95	1967 Nac	15	Independiente	Independiente	4–0	Artime (2), Savoy, Tarabini	
96	1968 Met	Interzonal	Racing	Racing	1–0	Salomone	
97	1968 Met	Interzonal	Independiente	(Draw)	2–2	Yazalde (2)	Perfumo, Salomone
98	1968 Nac	5	Racing	Racing	4–1	Salomone (3), Basile	Yazalde
99	1969 Met	Interzonal	Racing	(Draw)	2–2	M. Da Silva, Cominelli	Tarabini (2)
100	1969 Met	Interzonal	Independiente	Independiente	2–1	Tarabini, Wolff (autogol)	Perfumo
101	1969 Nac	17	Boca	Racing	3–1	Tarabini	Cárdenas, Cominelli, Lamelza
102	1970 Met	21	Racing	Independiente	3–2	Benítez, Perfumo	Maglioni, Tarabini, Yazalde
103	1970 Nac	Interzonal	Racing	(Draw)	2–2	Adorno, Rocchia	Maglioni, Yazalde
104	1970 Nac	Interzonal	Independiente	Independiente	2–1	Tarabini, Yazalde	Wolff
105	1971 Met	4	Racing	(Draw)	3–3	Luna, Rocchia, Squeo	Giachello (2), Balbuena
106	1971 Met	23	Independiente	Independiente	1–0	Pastoriza	
107	1971 Nac	Interzonal	San Lorenzo	Independiente	2–1	Magán, Maglioni	J. Benítez
108	1972 Met	5	Racing	(Draw)	1–1	Cárdenas	Cavoli
109	1972 Met	22	Independiente	Independiente	1–0	Palomba, Pavoni	Cárdenas
110	1972 Nac	Interzonal	Boca	Racing	2–1	Bochini	Cárdenas, Lamelza
111	1973 Met	10	Racing	(Draw)	0–0		
112	1973 Met	27	Independiente	(Draw)	0–0		
113	1973 Nac	Interzonal	Racing	Independiente	3–1	Scotta	Bertoni, Maglioni, Sá
114	1974 Met	Interzonal	Independiente	Independiente	4–1	Bochini (3), Galván	Mifflin
115	1974 Met	Interzonal	Racing	Independiente	5–1	Scotta	Bertoni (2), Galván, Raimondo, Saggioratto
116	1974 Nac	Interzonal	Independiente	Independiente	2-0	Bochini, Saggioratto	
117	1974 Nac	Interzonal	Racing	(Draw)	1–1	Álvarez	E. Commisso
118	1975 Met	4	Racing	Independiente	5–1	Scotta	Balbuena (2), Giribet, Pavoni, Ruiz Moreno
119	1975 Met	23	Independiente	Independiente	4–1	Bochini (2), Bertoni, Giribet	Buzzo
120	1975 Nac	Interzonal	Racing	Racing	5–4	Jorge (4)	Bertoni, Pavoni, Rojas, Sá
121	1975 Nac	Interzonal	Independiente	(Draw)	1–1	Rojas	Scotta
122	1976 Met	Interzonal	Independiente	Independiente	4–2	Astegiano (3), Trossero	Fortunato, Gottardi
123	1976 Met	Interzonal	Racing	Independiente	3–1	Correa	Astegiano, Bertoni, Pavoni
124	1976 Nac	Interzonal	Racing	Independiente	2–1	Glaría	Arroyo, Astegiano
125	1976 Nac	Interzonal	Racing	(Draw)	1–1	Astegiano	D. Marangoni
126	1977 Met	13	Independiente	(Draw)	0–0		
127	1977 Met	36	Racing	(Draw)	0–0		
128	1978 Met	3	Racing	Racing	3–2	Avallay, Cordero, Olarticoechea	Brítez, Outes
129	1978 Met	24	Independiente	Independiente	1-0	Bochini	
130	1979 Nac	Interzonal	Racing	Independiente	3–2	P. Cárdenas, F. Rodríguez	Outes (2), Alzamendi
131	1979 Nac	Interzonal	Independiente	Racing	3–2	Barberón, Larrosa	R. Alonso, Calderón, Giachello
132	1980 Met	8	Racing	(Draw)	1–1	Roldán	Olguín
133	1980 Met	27	Independiente	Independiente	1–0	Alzamendi	
134	1980 Nac	Interzonal	Independiente	(Draw)	1–1	Brailovsky	R. Alonso
135	1980 Nac	Interzonal	Racing	Independiente	2–1	Carrasco	Alzamendi, Mazo
136	1981 Met	7	Independiente	Racing	2–1	Olguín	Carrasco, Villarruel
137	1981 Met	24	Vélez	(Draw)	0–0		
138	1981 Nac	Interzonal	Independiente	(Draw)	0–0		
139	1981 Nac	Interzonal	Boca	Independiente	2–1	Magán	Calderón (2)
140	1982 Nac	Interzonal	Independiente	(Draw)	1–1	Alzamendi	Sarulyte
141	1982 Nac	Interzonal	Vélez	Independiente	2–1	Monzón (own goal)	Brailowsky, Castello (own goal)
142	1982 Met	14	Boca	Independiente	2–0		Morete, Trossero
143	1982 Met	33	Independiente	Independiente	3–1	Burruchaga, Calderón, Marangoni	J. E. Solari
144	1983 Met	19	Huracán	Independiente	2–1	Orte	Azzolini (own goal), C. Carrizo
145	1983 Met	38	Independiente	Independiente	2–0	Giusti, Trossero	
146	1986–87	2	Racing	(Draw)	0–0		
147	1986–87	21	Independiente	(Draw)	0–0	Bochini, Percudani	Ingrao (own goal), I. Ortíz
148	1987–88	11	Independiente	(Draw)	1–1	F. Navarro	R. Paz
149	1987–88	30	Racing	Racing	3–1	Colombatti, Medina Bello, Wiktor (own goal)	Barberón
150	1988–89	17	Racing	Racing	2–1	Colombatti, R. Paz	Merlini
151	1988–89	36	Independiente	(Draw)	0–0 (4–1) (Note: During this tournament, in case of a draw, one team won after a penalty shoot-out)		
152	1989–90	11	Independiente	(Draw)	2–2	M. Lobo, Osterrieth	H. Pérez, Olarticoechea
153	1989–90	30	Racing	Racing	1–0	Olarticoechea	
154	1990 Ap	2	Independiente	(Draw)	1–1	Ubaldi	H. Pérez
155	1991 Cl	2	Racing	(Draw)	0–0		
156	1991 Ap	5	Racing	(Draw)	0–0		
157	1992 Cl	5	Independiente	(Draw)	0–0		
158	1992 Ap	6	Independiente	(Draw)	1–1	Reinoso	Graciani
159	1993 Cl	6	Racing	(Draw)	1–1	C. Torres	G. López
160	1993 Ap	8	Racing	Racing	1–0	De Vicente	
161	1994 Cl	8	Independiente	(Draw)	2–2	Cagna, Rambert	Allegue, C. López
162	1994 Ap	3	Racing	Independiente	2–0		G. López, H. Pérez
163	1995 C	3	Independiente	(Draw)	0–0		
164	1995 Ap	8	Independiente	(Draw)	2–2	Burruchaga, Cagna	Delgado, C. López
165	1996 Cl	8	Racing	(Draw)	1–1	Facciutto	J.L. Calderón
166	1996 Ap	4	Independiente	(Draw)	2–2	Arzeno, Guerrero	Arzeno (own goal), Fuertes
167	1997 Cl	4	Racing	Independiente	2–1	Ubeda	J.L. Calderón (2)
168	1997 Ap	4	Independiente	Independiente	2–0	Guerrero, Reggi	
169	1998 Cl	4	Racing	(Draw)	0–0		
170	1998 Ap	3	Independiente	Racing	3–1	Cascini	Bezombe, Delgado, A. Morales
171	1999 Cl	3	Racing	Independiente	2–0		J.L. Calderón, C. Gómez
172	1999 Ap	11	Racing	(Draw)	0–0		
173	2000 Cl	11	Independiente	Independiente	2–1	Cambiasso, Marioni	Monserrat
174	2000 Ap	19	Racing	Independiente	2–0		Cambiasso, Vuoso
175	2001 Cl	19	Independiente	Racing	1–0		Estévez
176	2001 Ap	2	Independiente	(Draw)	1–1	Forlán	Loeschbor
177	2002 Cl	2	Racing	Independiente	2–1	Bedoya	Silvera, Vuoso
178	2002 Ap	4	River Plate	Independiente	4–1	Romero	Daniel Montenegro (2), Ríos, Silvera
179	2003 Cl	4	Lanús	(Draw)	1–1	Silvera	D. Milito
180	2003 Ap	15	Racing	(Draw)	1–1	Rimoldi	Manso
181	2004 Cl	15	Lanús	Racing	3–1	Eluchans	G. Fernández (2), L. López
182	2004 Ap	8	Independiente	Independiente	1–0	J. Castillo	
183	2005 Cl	8	Racing	Racing	3–1	Falcón, M. Guerrero, L. López	Frutos
184	2005 Ap	6	Independiente	Independiente	4–0	Frutos (3), Agüero	
185	2006 Cl	6	Racing	Independiente	2–0		Agüero (2)
186	2006 Ap	15	Independiente	Independiente	2–0	Montenegro (2)	
187	2007 Cl	15	Racing	(Draw)	1–1	Sava	G. Rodríguez
188	2007 Ap	17	Racing	(Draw)	0–0		
189	2008 Cl	17	Vélez	(Draw)	0–0		
190	2008 Ap	3	Racing	(Draw)	1–1	F. Sosa	Montenegro
191	2009 Cl	3	Huracán	Independiente	2-0	Montenegro, Pusineri	
192	2009 Ap	6	Racing	Independiente	2–1	Ledesma	Gandín (2)
193	2010 Cl	6	Independiente	Independiente	1–0	Gandín	
194	2010 Ap	10	Independiente	Independiente	1–0	C. Báez	
195	2011 Cl	10	Racing	Racing	2–0	T. Gutiérrez, Hauche	
196	2011 Ap	10	Racing	(Draw)	1–1	Hauche	Parra
197	2012 Cl	10	Independiente	Independiente	4–1	Parra (2), P. Rodríguez, Vidal	T. Gutiérrez
198	2012 Ini	3	Racing	Racing	2–0	Sand (2)	
199	2013 Fin	3	Independiente	Independiente	2–0	Miranda, Santana	
200	2014	5	Independiente	Independiente	2–1	Mancuello, Penco	D. Milito
201	2015	13	Racing	Racing	1–0	D. Milito	
202	2015	24	Independiente	Independiente	3–0	Benítez, Méndez, Vera	
203	2015	Liguilla	Independiente	Racing	2–0		Bou, O. Romero
204	2015	Liguilla	Racing	Independiente	2–1	Lollo	C. Rodríguez, Lucero
205	2016	4	Independiente	(Draw)	1–1	L. Fernández	L. López
206	2016	12	Racing	(Draw)	0–0		
207	2016–17	11	Racing	Racing	3–0	L. López (2), Bou	
208	2016–17	24	Independiente	Independiente	2–0	Meza, Rigoni	
209	2017–18	10	Racing	Independiente	1–0		L. Fernández
210	2018–19	19	Independiente	Racing	3–1	F. Gaibor	A. Donatti, L. López, Zaracho
211	2019–20	19	Racing	Racing	1-0	M. Díaz	
212	2021	5	Independiente	Independiente	1–0	S. Romero	
213	2022	7	Racing	Racing	1–0	G. Hauche	
214	2023	12	Independiente	(Draw)	1–1	Cauteruccio	M. Rojas
215	2024	12	Racing	(Draw)	0–0		
216	2025 Ap	Interzonal	Independiente	(Draw)	1–1	A. Angulo	G. Martirena
217	2025 Cl	Interzonal	Racing	(Draw)	0–0		
218	2026 Ap	Interzonal	Independiente	Independiente	1–0	G. Ávalos	
219	2026 Cl	Interzonal	Racing	(Draw)	1–1	M. Zaracho	M. Meza

==== Head-to-head statistics in Primera División ====
Independiente Wins	85
Draws	72
Racing Wins	62
Total	219

=== National cups matches ===
Complete list of games played in national cups:

#	Cup	Year	Date	Venue	Winner	Score	Goals (H)	Goals (A)
1	Copa Jockey Club	1917	22 Apr	Racing	(Draw)	1–1 (a.e.t.)	Marcovecchio	O. García
2	Copa Jockey Club	1917	6 May	Racing	(Draw)	0–0 (a.e.t.)		
3	Copa Jockey Club	1917	13 May	Racing	Independiente	1–0		Ronzoni
4	Copa Honor MCBA	1917	22 Jul	Independiente	Racing	3–1 (a.e.t.)	Betular (o.g.)	Marcovecchio (2), Vivaldo
5	Copa Honor MCBA	1918	9 Jul	Independiente	Independiente	2–1	Canavery, Galeano	Ohaco
6	Copa Competencia (AAmF)	1924	18 Jan	Racing	(Draw)	0–0		
7	Copa Competencia (AAmF)	1924	25 Jan	Racing	(Draw)	0–0		
8	Copa Competencia (AAmF)	1924	1 Feb	Independiente	(Draw)	0–0		
9	Copa Competencia (AAmF)	1926	13 May	Racing	Independiente	2–0		Seoane, Orsi
10	Copa Beccar Varela	1933	28 Jan	San Lorenzo	(Draw)	3–3	Fassora (2), Conidares	Zorrilla (2), Rojas
11	Copa Beccar Varela	1933	4 Feb	River Plate	Racing	4–1	Conidares (4)	Sastre
12	Copa Centenario AFA	1993	25 Jun	Independiente	Racing	2–1	H. Pérez	Vallejos, C. López
13	Copa Centenario AFA	1993	2 Jul	Racing	Racing	3–2	Fleita (2), De Vicente	H. Pérez, Vilallonga
14	Copa LPF	2021	10 Apr	Racing	Racing	1–0	Copetti	
15	Copa LPF	2022	19 Mar	Independiente	Racing	2–1	L. González	Hauche, Copetti
16	Copa LPF	2023	30 Sep	Racing	Independiente	2–0		Canelo, Martínez
17	Copa LPF	2024	24 Feb	Independiente	Racing	1–0		A. Martínez

==== Head-to-head statistics in National cups ====
Independiente Wins	4
Draws	6
Racing Wins	7
Total	17

=== International cups matches ===
Complete list of games played in national cups:

#	Cup	Year	Date	Venue	Winner	Score	Goals (H)	Goals (A)
1	Supercopa Libertadores	1992	2 Oct	Racing	Racing	2–1	C. García, Torres	Mahía
2	Supercopa Libertadores	1992	8 Oct	Independiente	(Draw)	0–0		

==== Head-to-head statistics in international cups ====
Independiente Wins	0
Draws	1
Racing Wins	1
Total	2

=== Titles by club ===
Competition	Ind.	Rac.
Primera División	16	18
National cups	9	15
Intercontinental Cup	2	1
Copa Libertadores	7	1
Copa Sudamericana	2	1
Recopa Sudamericana	1	1
Copa Suruga Bank	1	0
Supercopa Libertadores	2	1
Copa Interamericana	3	1
Copa de Honor Cousenier	0	1
Copa Aldao	2	2
Total	45	42

== Independiente highlights ==
- On November 3, 1940, Independiente beat Racing 7–0, the biggest winning margin in the history of the derby.
- On August 20, 1961, Independiente secured a 4–0 home win, but it was not enough to stop Racing club from eventually winning the championship.
- On December 17, 1967, on the last day of the Nacional Independiente beat the visiting Racing Club team 4–0 with 2 goals from Luis Artime to win the championship.
- The last round of fixtures during the Metropolitano 1970 saw River Plate beat Unión de Santa Fe 6–0 to give them a chance of stealing the championship for Independiente. On July 27 Independiente travelled to El Cilindro eventually winning the game 3–2 to give them the championship by the narrowest of margins, they finished level on points with River, both teams with a +18 goal difference, Independiente had scored 43 goals to River's 42.
- On March 24, 1974, Independiente beat Racing 4–1 with a hat-trick from Ricardo Bochini, the only one he scored in 714 games for the club.
- On May 19, 1974, during the Metropolitano 1974 Independiente won 5–1 at El Cilindro. They repeated the 5–1 away win less than one year later on March 2, 1975, in the Metropolitano 1975.
- On December 22, 1983, in the last game of the Metropolitano Independiente knew that a win would see them crowned champions what's more the visiting Racing team had already been relegated from the Primera for the first time in the professional era of Argentine football. Independiente won 2–0 with goals from Ricardo Giusti and Enzo Trossero to win the championship.
- In the 1994 Opening Tournament, Independiente wins the derby after 11 years of not being able to achieve it.
- In the 1997 Opening Tournament, Independiente wins the derby in La Doble Visera after 14 years of not being able to achieve it.
- On August 19, 2002, Independiente won 4–1 at River Plate Stadium on their way to winning the Apertura 2002 championship.
- On September 11, 2005, Independiente won 4–0 at La Doble Visera, with a hat-trick from Nicolás Frutos and the best goal of Sergio Agüero.
- On November 25, 2017, Independiente, with reserve players, won 1-0 at El Cilindro.

== Racing highlights ==
- On May 31, 1931, the teams were due to meet for the first round of fixtures of the professional era of Argentine football. Racing asked to postpone the game and Independiente accepted. This meant that the first game between the two took place on September 27 at Racing Club's ground the eventual score was 7–4 to Racing, it still stands as the highest scoring game between the two.
- On September 15, 1963, Racing secured a 4–0 away win, but Independiente recovered to win the championship virtually mirroring the events of 1961.
- On November 20, 1966, Racing Club were crowned as champions, one week later they played Independiente, and the game finished 3–3.
- On September 21, 1975, during the Nacional Racing won 5–4 in el Cilindro with Alberto Jorge scoring 4 goals, three from the penalty spot. Jorge is the only player to score 4 in the Avellaneda derby and this was the last time that Racing were given 3 penalties in a game.
- In 1992 Racing Club and Independiente met in the Supercopa Sudamericana, Racing Club won their home leg 2–1 and on October 8, 1992, held Independiente to a 0–0 draw to win on aggregate. It is the only time the two have met in international competition.
- On August 26, 2001, in the 2nd round of fixtures Racing Club's Gabriel Loeschbor scored in the last minute of the game to earn a 1–1 draw. At the end of the Apertura 2001 Racing won the championship by one point.
- In 2015 they met in the "Liguilla Pre-Libertadores", Racing won 2–0 the first leg in the Independiente's stadium, Independiente won 2–1 in the Racing's stadium, but Racing qualified to the Copa Libertadores by an aggregate score of 3–2.
- On February 23, 2019, the Derby was played at the Libertadores de América, Racing came as the leader of the championship and Independiente had hopes of damaging Racing chances of winning the tournament. Racing defeated Independiente 3–1 and got a very important victory that would allow them to remain as leader and eventually get their 18th championship on March 31, 2019, after drawing against Tigre.
- On February 9, 2020, Racing obtained a remarkable 1–0 victory while playing with 9 men for the whole second half.

== Players for both clubs ==
This is a non-exhaustive list of players to have played for both clubs.

- (Argentina) Roque Avallay
- (Argentina) Agustín Balbuena
- (Argentina) Gabriel Calderón
- (Argentina) Néstor Clausen
- (Argentina) Luis Alberto Carranza
- (Argentina) Emmanuel Culio
- (Argentina) Osvaldo Escudero
- (Argentina) Carlos Fren
- (Argentina) Esteban Fuertes
- (Argentina) Claudio Graf
- (Argentina) Miguel Ángel Ludueña
- (Argentina) Osvaldo Miranda
- (Argentina) Hilario Navarro
- (Argentina) José Pastoriza
- (Argentina) Hugo Pérez
- (Argentina) Norberto Raffo
- (Uruguay) Marcelo Saralegui
- (Argentina) José Serrizuela
