= 1913 Argentine Primera División final =

1913 Primera División final
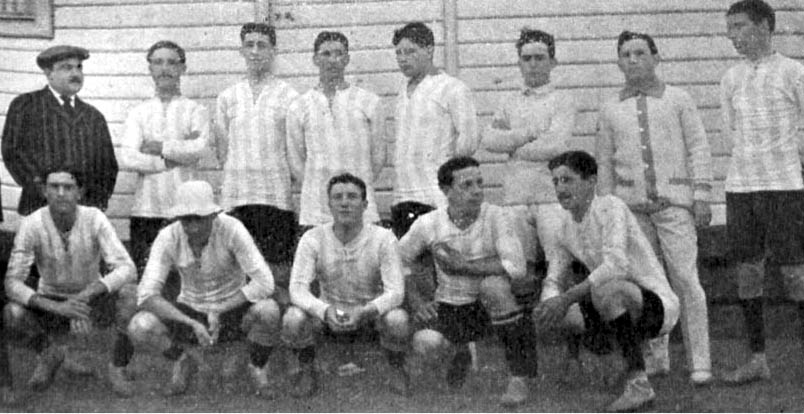
- Racing Club, champions
- Event: 1913 Primera División
Racing	San Isidro
2	0
- Date: 28 December 1913
- Venue: Estadio Racing Club, Avellaneda
- Referee: Héctor Alfano
- Attendance: 9,000

The 1913 Argentine Primera División final was the match that determined the winner of 1913 season of Argentine Primera División. The final was contested by Racing and San Isidro, in order to decide a champion after both teams had finished tied on both, points (24 in 14 matches played) and goal difference (+36) at the end of the tournament.

It was the 1st. league final contested by both clubs. It was held in Estadio Racing Club of Avellaneda. Racing won their first league title after defeating San Isidro 2–0 with two goals by Alberto Ohaco, Racing's all-time topscorer.

The match was notable for having been the first title (out of seven consecutive championships) won by Racing Club, setting a record in Argentine football that still remains nowadays.

== Qualified teams ==
Team	Previous finals app.
Racing	(none)
San Isidro	(none)

Bold indicates winning years

== Venue ==
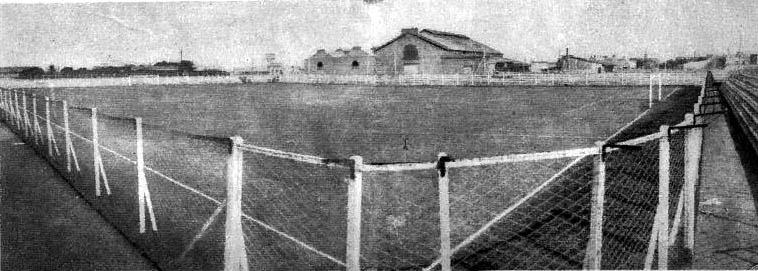
Racing Club Stadium, venue

Unlike other Primera División finals, it was not held in neutral venue but in the Racing Club Stadium located on Alsina and Colón streets in Avellaneda. It was the home of Racing Club until the club moved to the current Presidente Perón Stadium, located on the same site and inaugurated in 1950.

By those times the stadium held 20,000 spectators. It was one of two stadiums that hosted the first Copa América in 1916, along with GEBA Stadium. The stadium was the second football venue in importance by then.

== Background ==
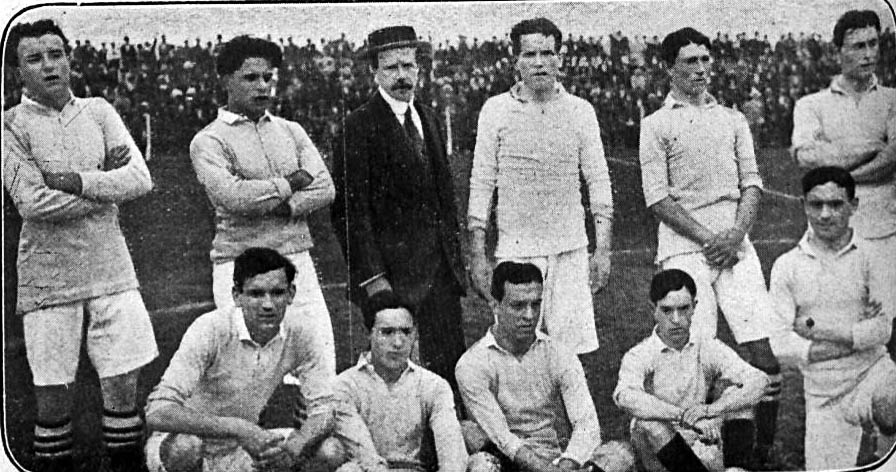
Team of San Isidro that played the final

Racing finished the tournament with a record of 12 wins, and only 2 defeats, scoring 41 goals and only receiving 5 goals in 14 matches played. Some of Racing's largest victories were vs Banfield (6–0), Olivos (5–0), Platense (4–0), Estudiantil Porteño (5–0), and Comercio (4–0). Their only two defeats were at the hands of River Plate and Boca Juniors (1–0).

On the other hand, San Isidro held a 11–2–1 record, with highlighted matches vs Banfield (4–0), Riachuelo (7–0), Ferrocarril del Sud (5–0), and Olivos (10–0), which was the largest victory of the entire season. The only defeat was at the hands of Racing Club.

As both teams tied on both, points and goal difference (+36), a playoff had to be held to decide a champion.

== Match details ==
1913 Primera División Final
28 December 1913
Final

Racing	2–0	San Isidro
Ohaco 11', 70'	Report

Estadio Racing Club, Avellaneda
Attendance: 9,000
Referee: Héctor Alfano

**Racing**
**San Isidro**

GK	(Argentina) Carlos Muttoni
DF	(Argentina) Armando Reyes
DF	(Argentina) Saturnino Ochoa
MF	(Argentina) Ángel Betular
MF	(Argentina) Francisco Olazar
MF	(Argentina) Ricardo Pepe
FW	(Argentina) Juan Viazzi
FW	(Argentina) Alberto Ohaco (c)
FW	(Argentina) Alberto Marcovecchio
FW	(Argentina) Juan Hospital
FW	(Argentina) Juan Perinetti

GK	Carlos T. Wilson
DF	Juan Iriarte
DF	Juan J. Bello
MF	Juan Goodfellow
MF	José Morroni (c)
MF	Alberto Olivieri
FW	Elías Fernández
FW	Juan Rossi
FW	Julio Fernández
FW	Roberto L. Hulme
FW	Alfredo Meira

== Aftermath ==
The 1913 title was the first of seven consecutive league titles won by Racing Club, a record that still stands to date. Those achievements made the club be recognised as the successor of British-origin club Alumni, which had been the most successful football team until its dissolution in 1911.

The large number of titles won during the 1910s included five Copa Ibarguren, five Copa de Honor MCBA, two Copa de Honor Cousenier and one Copa Aldao. Those achievements made Racing become the most successful team of the decade with a total of 20 titles won. That big success plus their style of play (which established what was called the creole football to diffenciate it from the British style introduced by Alumni, Lomas, or Quilmes during the first years of Argentine football) earned Racing Club the nickname The Academy, which still remains nowadays as their distinctive landmark nickname.
