= Zoilo Canavery =

Uruguayan footballer (1893–1966)

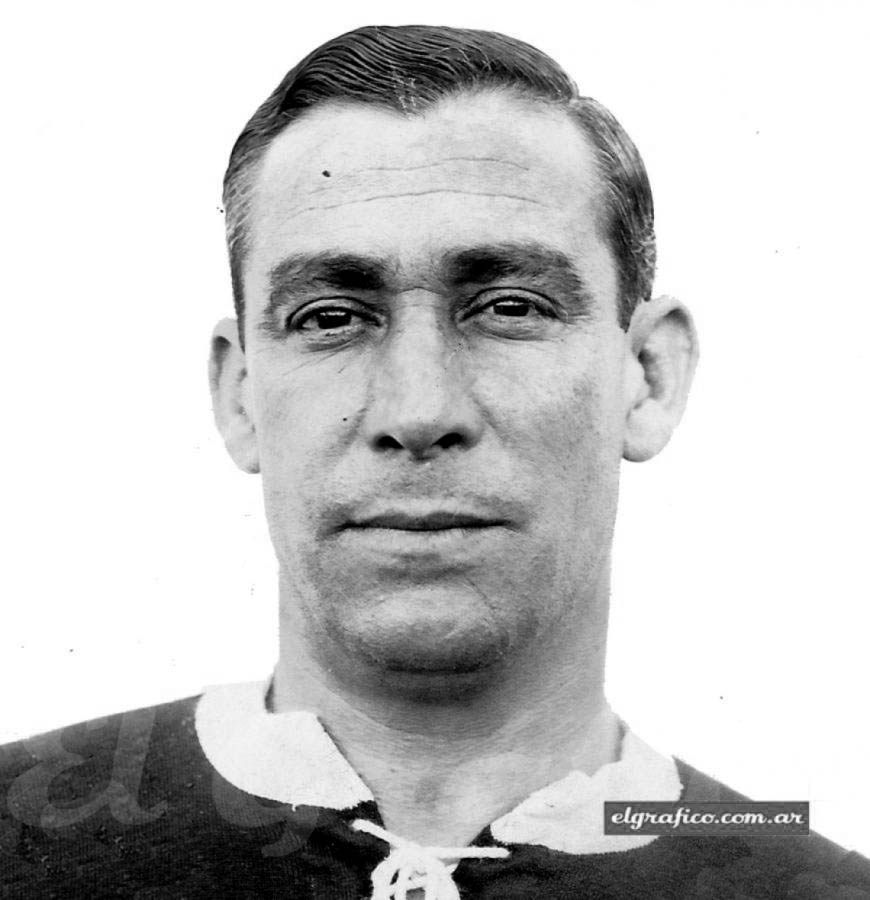
- Canavery while playing for Independiente

Personal information
- Full name: Zoilo Ladislao Canavery
- Date of birth: July 26, 1893
- Place of birth: Montevideo, Uruguay
- Date of death: September 29, 1966 (aged 73)
- Place of death: Avellaneda, Argentina
- Position: Forward

Youth career
- 1911–1912: Independiente

Senior career*
| Years | Team | Apps | (Gls) |
| (1918) (1921–1929) | Independiente | | (40) |
| (1913) | River Plate | | (1) |
| (1914–1917) | Racing | | (21) |
| (1919–1920) | Boca Juniors | | (7) |

International career
| 1915–1916 | Argentina | | |
- * Club domestic league appearances and goals

Zoilo Canavery (26 July 1893 – 29 September 1966) was a Uruguayan football player. Born in Montevideo, Canavery was a notable figure of Argentine sport during the 1910 and 1920 decades, playing in four of the "big five" of Argentina, such as Independiente, River Plate, Racing and Boca Juniors.

Canavery played the most of his career at Independiente, where he spent two tenures (1912–1918 and 1921–1928). With the Red Devils, he won two league championships (1922, 1926), and three Copa de Competencia (organised by dissident Asociación Amateurs de Football) in 1924, 1925 and 1926.

The Red Devils (Diablos Rojos in the original language) nickname was given to Independiente by a journalist who highlighted the skills and effectiveness team's attacking line formed by Canavery, Alberto Lalín, Luis Ravaschino, Manuel Seoane and Raimundo Orsi.

== Personal life ==
He was born in Montevideo, Uruguay, the son of Valerio Canavery and Tomasa Tones, belonging to a middle class family. His father, born in Barracas al Sud, was the son of a family of tanners of Irish and Creole descent. His mother, born in Bilbao, belonged to a family of immigrants of French Basque origin, established towards the end of the 19th century in Avellaneda.

Zoilo Canavery did his elementary studies in Buenos Aires, and worked as a Municipal official in the civil registration of Avellaneda (Buenos Aires Province). He was cousin of Pedro Canaveri, a politician belonging to the Radical Party, who served as president of Club Independiente and Argentine Football Association.

His paternal grandparents Pedro Canavery and Sabina Rodríguez are registered in the National Census of 1895.

Juan Canaverys, great-great-grandfather of Zoilo Canavery, was a colonial official born in Saluzzo, who served during the Viceroyalty of the Río de la Plata in the Tribunal Mayor de Cuentas de Buenos Aires.

== Career ==
=== Club ===
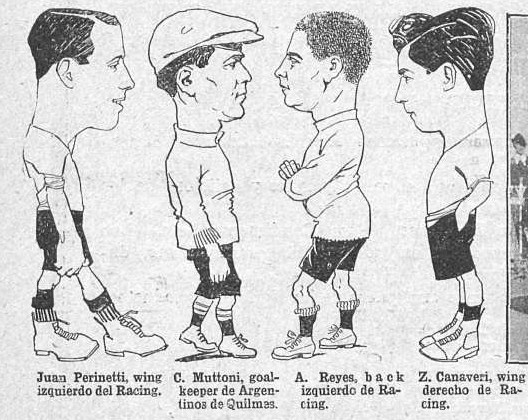
Canavery (first from right) depicted on Caras y Caretas, 1914

Canavery debuted in 1912 for Independiente as a right winger. On December 22, 1912, Independiente lost the Primera División playoff game to Porteño. Independiente line-up was W.Peterson; J. Idiarte, L. Calneggia; M. Deluchi, E. Sande; A. Lanatta; Z. Canavery, B. Lloveras, J. Rodríguez, E. Colla, F. Roldán. Team coach was Juan Mignaburu.

The match was suspended because several players of Independiente abandoned the field after 87 minutes. The championship was awarded to Porteño on Dec 23.

In 1913 Canavery was traded to River Plate, where he played only one match against Estudiantes de Buenos Aires, scoring a goal in the game in which River lost 4–2 for the Honor Cup that year. With Canavery playing for the club, River Plate would finish 3rd. in the 1913 championship.

Between 1914 and 1917 Canavery played for Racing Club de Avellaneda, where some of his teammates were Ángel Betular, Alberto Ohaco, Alberto Marcovecchio, Juan Hospital and Natalio Perinetti. In Racing, Canavery won three Primera División titles (1914, 1915 and 1916), two Copa Ibarguren (1914 and 1916) and one Copa de Honor Municipalidad de Buenos Aires in 1915.

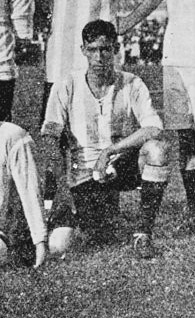
Canavery in Racing, where he played between 1914 and 1917

On September 3, 1914, Canavery played an international club match against the Piedmontese team Torino, that was won by Racing by 1–0 with goal of Alberto Ohaco. That same year, he played a match against the Exeter City F.C., in a match won by Exeter against the Racing Club de Avellaneda by 2 to 0. Among the figures of the English team were Sam Strettle and Billy Goodwin.

In 1915, he scored one of three goals in which Racing beat Ferro Carril Oeste in the semifinals of the Copa Competencia. That same year he also played the semifinal of the Copa de Honor, in which Racing thrashed 5–0 to Club Atlético San Isidro. In the 1915 First Division Championship won by Racing he scored goals against Porteño, Kimberley, Platense, Defensores de Belgrano and Gimnasia y Esgrima de Buenos Aires.

He settled in Montevideo in 1917, the year in which they tried to hire him to play for the Club Atletico Peñarol. In 1918 Canavery returned for one short time to Independiente, where he played the Copa de Honor. He later moved to Boca Juniors, who won their first title in 1919. Canavery stayed two seasons, scoring 12 goals in 32 matches played. Serving in the Boca Juniors team, Canavery played only a classic against River Plate, in a scoreless game played on June 29, 1919.

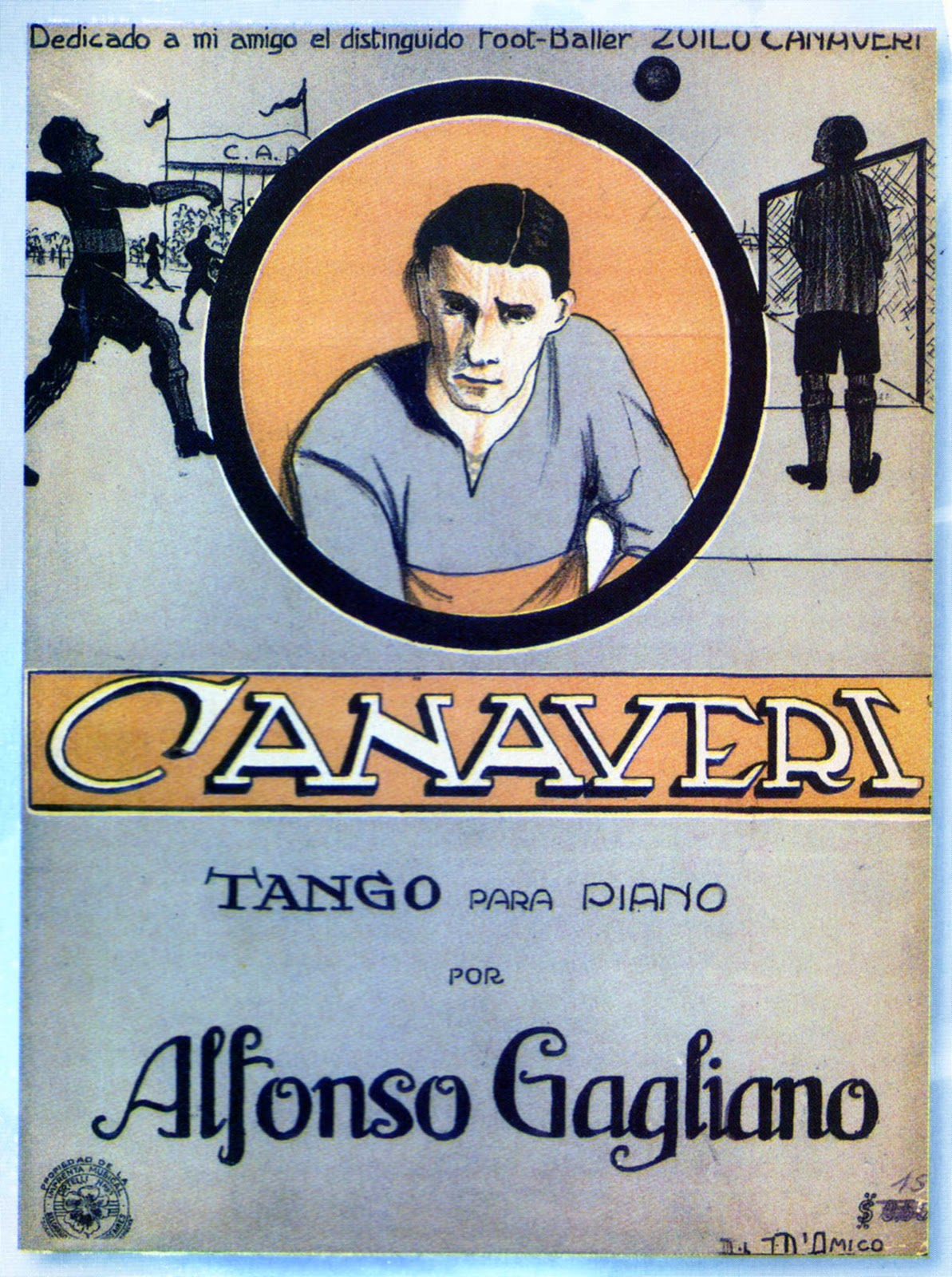
Canavery in Boca Juniors shirt on the cover for Canaveri, tango composed by Alfonso Gagliano

In Boca Juniors, Canavery played with notable footballers such as Américo Tesoriere, Alfredo Garasini and Pedro Calomino among others. Zoilo Canavery later returned to Independiente in 1921, where then he won the 1922 and 1926 championships. and three tournaments of the Copa de Competencia of 1924, 1925 and 1926.

Zoilo Canavery played several international friendly matches, including the match that Independiente won 2–1 against the Third Lanark, during the tour that the Scottish team made to Buenos Aires in 1923. The game was played on June 29, at the River Plate stadium, and the goals were converted by Raimundo Orsi and Ferguson, for the Third Lanark.

Canavery was part of the team who on August 11, 1928, at the stadium of Independiente dispute a match against Barcelona, win team of Avellaneda by 4–1 with goals from Canavery, Seoane (2), and Orsi. Reguiero scored a goal for Barça.

Towards the end of his career, Zoilo Canavery scored a penalty goal against Chacarita Juniors, in a match played at Independiente Stadium on March 10, 1929.

=== Argentina national team ===
Canavery was one of few foreigners to play for the Selección Argentina. Wearing the shirt of Argentina he came to play vs Uruguay in a final game played on August 15, 1916, by title Copa Newton, with an audience of 16,000 spectators- on Stadium Racing Club de Avellaneda, with a rotund triumph of Argentina by 3–1 with goals from Ohaco (2), and Hiller.

For the year of 1912, Canavery had integrated an Argentine team with figures of the official league and dissident, in a game to benefit the club Atlanta. In the Argentine team participated the figures of the time, including Juan Domingo Brown and Arnold Watson Hutton. He also had participated in several national squads of the Federación Argentina de Football, the dissident football association of Argentina between 1912 and 1914. He had taken part in teams with several national soccer figures, including Juan José Rithner, Juan Johnston and Guillermo Dannaher. In total he played four games in the dissident league, converting a goal against Federación Rosarina de Football, in a match played on June 1, 1913, for the Udaondo Cup. That same year he played the game in which Argentina thrashed the Uruguayan team 4–0 for the Copa Círculo de La Prensa, in a game played on September 28 in the stadium of Gimnasia y Esgrima de Buenos Aires.

Zoilo Canavery was also part of the Argentine team that thrashed Uruguay by 7–2 in the "Copa Círculo de La Prensa" first match. The game was played on October 1, 1916, in Avellaneda, and the goals were scored by Simmons, Hayes (3), Marius Hiller, who in earlier years also played for Germany (2) and Canavery for Argentina; Buffoni and Farinasso scored for Uruguay. The second match was held on October 29, in Montevideo, and won by Uruguay by 3–1, although Argentine was crowned champion due to goal average.

At the end of his career in 1929, Canavery took part in an international friendly match against Torino F.C. The Italian team won by 2–1 with former Newell's Old Boys player Julio Libonatti and Adolfo Baloncieri scoring for the Italians and Ravaschino for Independiente. That same year Canavery played another international match with Independiente v. English Chelsea F.C., team that was touring on South America. The game ended in a 1–1 draw with goals by Seoane and Harold Miller.

=== Manager ===
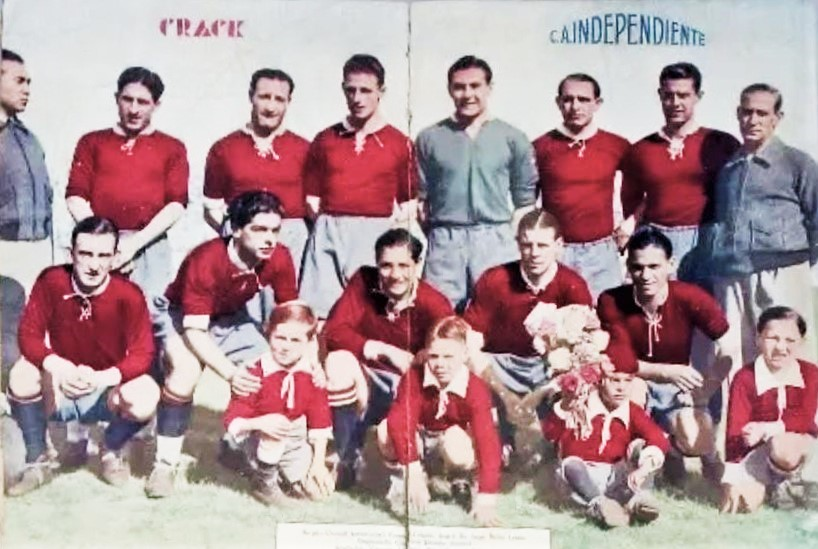
Canavery as coach of Independiente, standing first from the right

Zoilo Canavery played in the first team of the Independent Club until 1930, the year in which he decided to retire definitively to begin his activity as a sports coach. In 1932 Canavery was appointed head coach of Independiente, which played a playoff match v. River Plate. Independiente's line-up was Atilio Maccarone; Luis Fazio, Fermín Lecea; Juan M. Ferrou, Juan Carlos Corazzo, Emilio Almiñana; Roberto Porta, Antonio Sastre, Manuel Seoane, Manuel Ramos; Juan Betinotti. The match was played November 20, 1932 in Gasómetro de Avenida La Plata won by River 3–0 with goals from Bernabé Ferreyra, Carlos Peucelle and Ricardo Zatelli.

He was the sports director of Independiente for several seasons, including the first division championship of 1935 in which Independiente was runner-up. This team won several games by a landslide, including a 5–0 against Quilmes, 3–0 against Huracán, 5–2 against Estudiantes de La Plata, 9–3 against Tigre, 5–1 against Chacarita, and a 6–2 against Talleres de Remedios de Escalada.

== Titles ==
=== Club ===
Racing

- Primera División (3): 1914, 1915, 1916
- Copa Ibarguren (2): 1914, 1916
- Copa de Honor MCBA (1): 1915

Independiente

- Primera División (3): 1919, 1922, 1926
- Copa de Honor MCBA (1): 1918
- Copa Competencia (AAmF) (3): 1924, 1925, 1926

Boca Juniors

- Copa de Competencia Jockey Club (1): 1919

=== National team ===
Argentina

- Copa Newton (1): 1916
- Copa Círculo de La Prensa (1): 1916

== In popular culture ==
Canavery was honored by several composers of tango as Alfonso Gagliano, who recorded an instrumental song titled Canaveri, written in 1919. The album cover included a personal dedication by Gagliano himself that said "dedicated to my friend, the renowned foot-baller Zoilo Canavery". Other artists that mentioned Canavery in their art were Juan Sarcione, who wrote lyrics and music of Largue esa mujica, a tango performed by Carlos Gardel and recorded in 1929 for Odeon Records.

== Sources ==
- El partido que ya tiene identidad propia - Página/12
- Zoilo Canavery – Informe Xeneize
- Argentina – Copa Ibarguren
- Campeonato de la Asociación Argentina de Football 1916 on Racing Club website
- Con las dos casacas | River Plate – Paladar Millonario
- RSSSF – Copa Círculo de la Prensa
