= Pedro Ochoa =

Argentine footballer

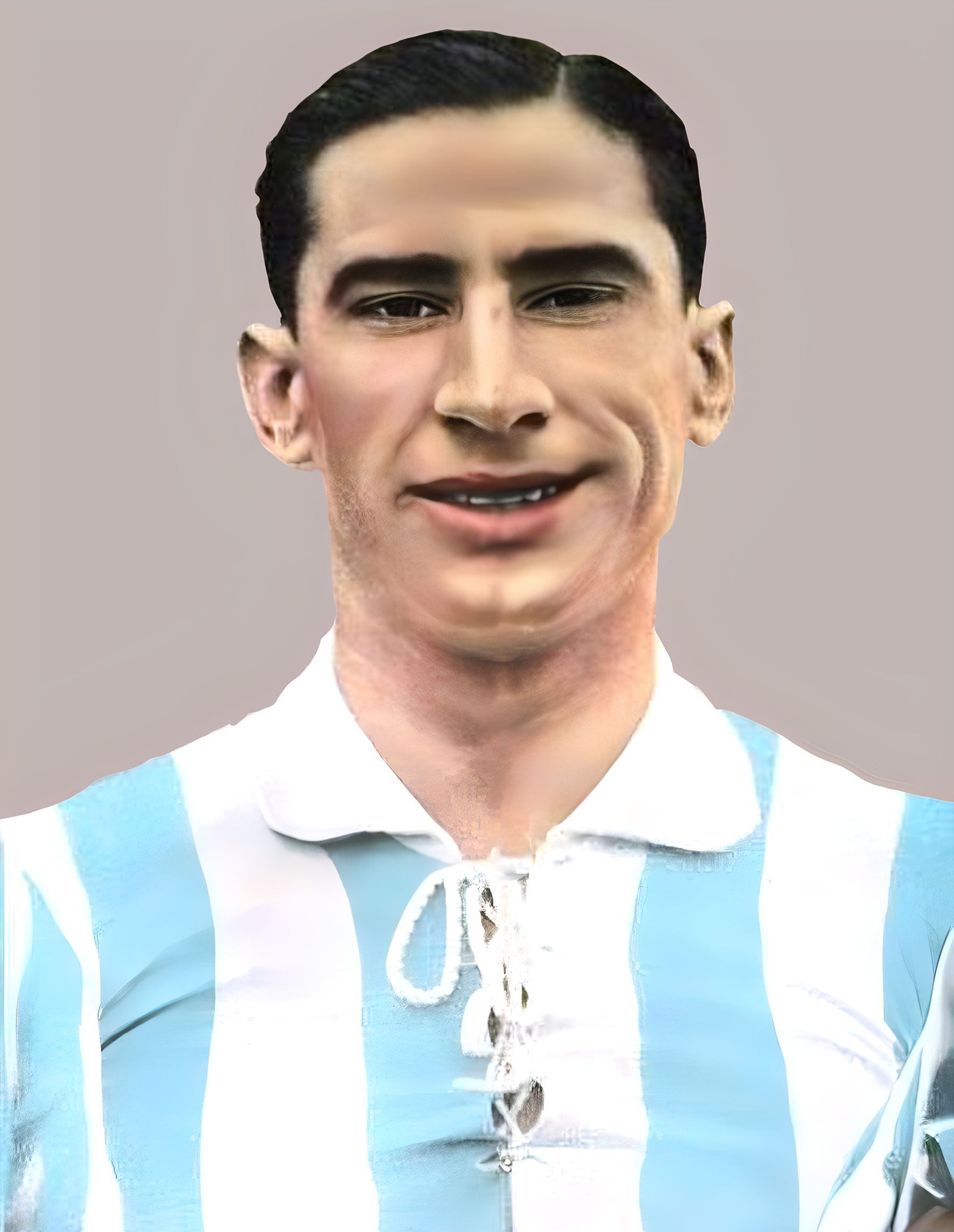

Personal information
- Full name: Pedro Ochoa Biagorri
- Date of birth: February 22, 1900
- Place of birth: Avellaneda, Argentina
- Date of death: September 5, 1947 (aged 47)
- Place of death: Tandil, Argentina
- Position: Striker

Senior career*
Years	Team	Apps	(Gls)
1916–1931	Racing Club	?	(?)

International career
1927–1928	Argentina	2	(0)
Medal record
Men's Football
Silver medal – second place	1928 Amsterdam	Team competition
- * Club domestic league appearances and goals as of October 2008

Pedro Ochoa (February 22, 1900 – September 5, 1947) was an Argentine football forward. At club level, he played his entire career for Racing Club, where he won 12 titles with the team.

== Biography ==
He debuted with the Racing senior team at the age of 16, soon becoming a fan favourite due to his conditions and skills as a playmaker.

Ochoa played his entire club career for Racing Club, where he won six league championships, 4 national cups and 2 international cups. He was nicknamed "Ochoíta" and El rey de la gambeta (The king of dribbling) due to his outstanding skills with the ball.

He was admired by Carlos Gardel, who sang the tango "Patadura" (a lunfardo word for a "two left feet man") written by José López Ares and Enrique Carrera Sotelo. The tango mentions several notable footballers of those years, such as Ochoa (referring him as Ochoíta), Manuel Seoane, Luis Monti and Domingo Tarasconi (as Tarasca).

Avoiding defenders with passes and dribblings, and being like Ochoíta, the fan's favourite

— Patadura, tango performed by Carlos Gardel.

Ochoa was part of the Argentina national team in the 1928 Olympic games, but he did not play in any matches. In 1931 he retired from football. Ochoa died at 47 years old, in Tandil, Buenos Aires Province.

If I think before playing? Sometimes I do, but when I dribble a player and immediately another one appears, and then another... I can't think anymore because I do not feel like playing. So the legs take control to continue dribbling rivals

— Pedro Ochoa, 1928.

== Honours ==
=== Racing Club ===
- Primera División (6): 1916, 1917, 1918, 1919, 1921, 1925
- Copa de Honor MCBA (1): 1917
- Copa Ibarguren (3): 1916, 1917, 1918
- Copa Aldao (2): 1917, 1918

=== Argentina national team ===
- Copa América (1): 1927
- Summer Olympics (1): 1928 (Silver medal)
