= Strettle (surname) =

Strettle is a surname. Notable people with the surname include:

- David Strettle (born 1983), English rugby union player
- Sam Strettle (1886–1926), English footballer
