= 1913 Copa Ibarguren =

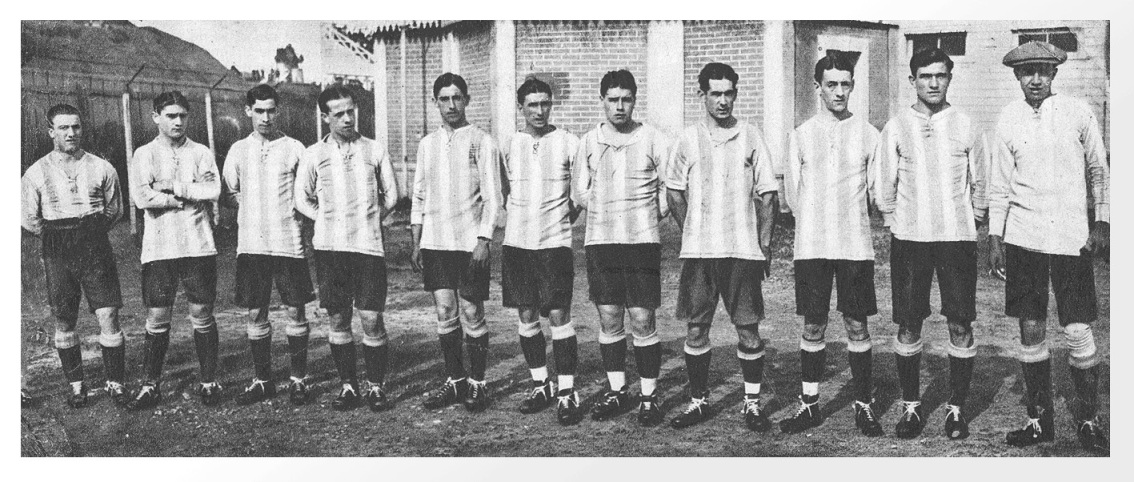
- A Racing team of 1914
Racing	Newell's Old Boys
3	1
- Date: April 5, 1914; 111 years ago
- Venue: Estadio Racing Club, Avellaneda
- Referee: Hugo Gondra

The 1913 Copa Ibarguren was the first edition of this National cup of Argentina, which trophy had been donated by Minister of Justice and Public Instruction, Dr. Carlos Ibarguren. It was played by the champions of both leagues, Primera División and Liga Rosarina de Football crowned during 1913.

Racing (Primera División champion) faced Newell's Old Boys (Liga Rosarina champion) at Estadio Racing Club in Avellaneda, on April 5, 1914. Racing won 3–1 with two goals by striker Alberto Marcovecchio.

== Qualified teams ==
Team	Qualification
Racing	1913 Primera División champion
Rosario Central	1913 Copa Nicasio Vila champion

== Venue ==
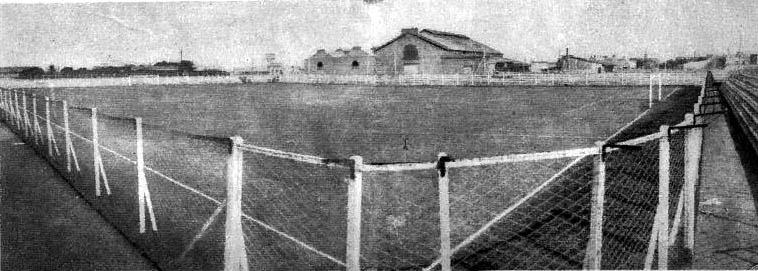
Racing Club Stadium, venue

== Match details ==
1913 Copa Ibarguren
5 April 1914

Racing	3–1	Newell's Old Boys
	Report

Estadio Racing Club, Avellaneda
Referee: Hugo Gondra

Racing	Newell's

GK	(Argentina) Carlos Muttoni
DF	(Argentina) Armando Reyes
DF	(Argentina) Saturnino Ochoa
MF	(Argentina) Ricardo Pepe
MF	(Argentina) Ángel Betular
MF	(Argentina) Francisco Olazar
FW	(Argentina) Juan Viazzi
FW	(Argentina) Alberto Ohaco
FW	(Argentina) Alberto Marcovecchio
FW	(Argentina) Juan Hospital
FW	(Argentina) Juan Perinetti

GK	(Argentina) José Luis Airaldi
DF	(Argentina) Florentino Varni
DF	(Argentina) Julio Ongay
MF	(Argentina) Cayetano Blotta
MF	(Argentina) Caraciolo González
MF	(Argentina) Antonio Torelli
FW	(Argentina) Anacleto Ongay
FW	(Argentina) John Luis Povey
FW	(Argentina) Tomás E. Hamblin
FW	(Argentina) Manuel P. González
FW	(Argentina) A. Martín
