= 1914 Copa Ibarguren =

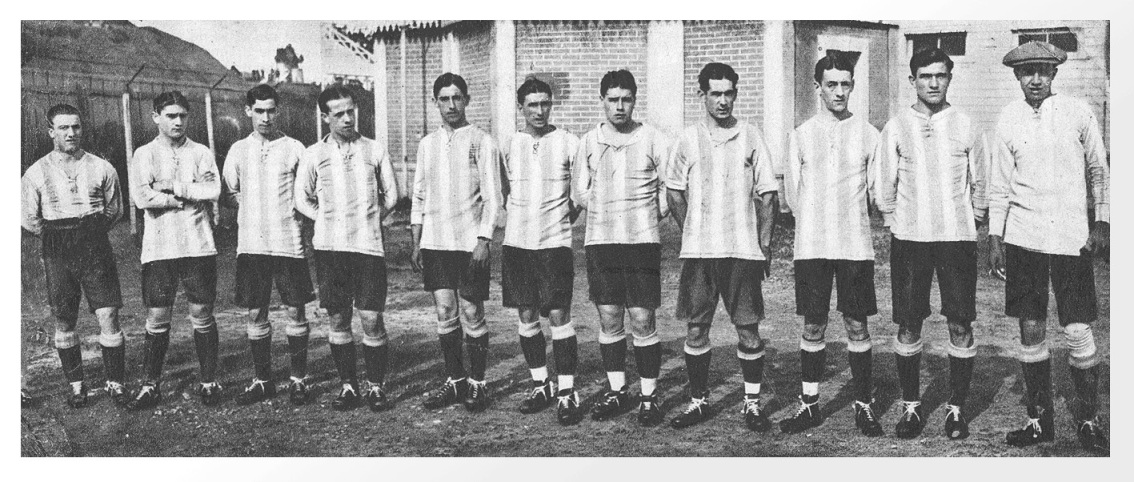
- A Racing team of 1914
Racing	Rosario Central
1	0
- Date: December 6, 1914; 110 years ago
- Venue: C.A. Estudiantes, Palermo, Buenos Aires
- Referee: (Unknown)

The 1914 Copa Ibarguren was the second edition of this National cup of Argentina. It was played by the champions of both leagues, Primera División and Liga Rosarina de Football crowned during 1914.

Racing (Primera División champion) faced Rosario Central (Liga Rosarina champion) at the stadium of Club Atlético Estudiantes located on Alvear Avenue (current Avenida del Libertador) and Oro in Palermo, on December 6, 1914. Racing won 3–1 with goal by striker Alberto Marcovecchio.

== Qualified teams ==
Team	Qualification	Previous app.
Racing	1914 Primera División champion	**1913**
Rosario Central	1914 Copa Nicasio Vila champion	(none)

Note

- **Bold** indicates winning years

== Match details ==
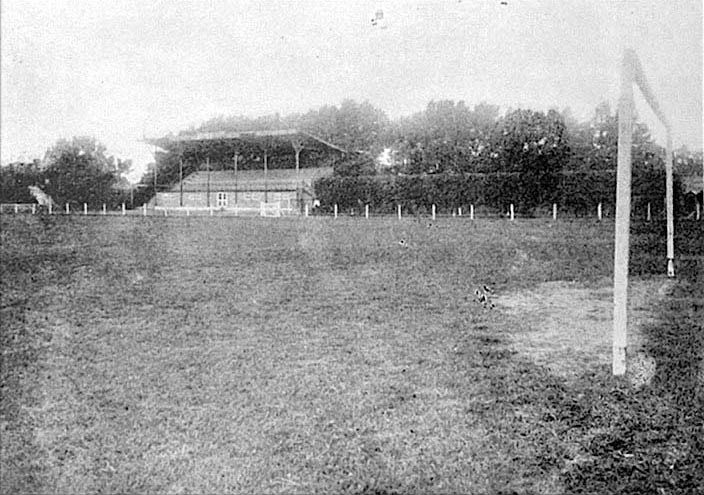
Estudiantes (BA) stadium in Palermo, venue

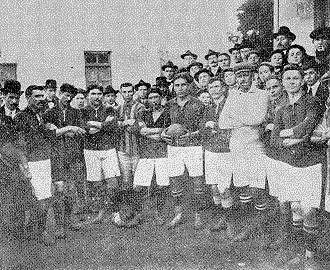
A Rosario Central team of 1914

1914 Copa Ibarguren
6 December 1914

Racing	1–0	Rosario Central
Marcovecchio 70'	Report

C.A. Estudiantes Stadium, Buenos Aires

**Racing**	**Rosario Central**

GK	(Argentina) Syla Arduino
DF	(Argentina) Armando Reyes
DF	(Argentina) Saturnino Ochoa
MF	(Argentina) Ricardo Pepe
MF	(Argentina) Francisco Olazar
MF	(Argentina) Ángel Betular
FW	(Uruguay) Zoilo Canavery
FW	(Argentina) Alberto Ohaco
FW	(Argentina) Alberto Marcovecchio
FW	(Argentina) Juan Hospital
FW	(Argentina) Juan Perinetti

GK	(Argentina) Serapio Acosta
DF	(Argentina) Zenón Díaz
DF	(Argentina) Ignacio Rotta
MF	(Argentina) Juan Díaz
MF	(Argentina) Alberto Ledesma
MF	(Argentina) Pablo F. Molina
FW	(Argentina) Alfredo Woodward
FW	(Argentina) Antonio Blanco
FW	(Argentina) Juan Enrique Hayes
FW	(Argentina) Ennis Hayes
FW	(Argentina) Fidel Ramìrez
