= Pedro Canaveri =

Argentine politician and sports manager

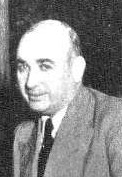
- Sr. Pedro Canaveri, c. 1934

President of the Argentine Football Association
- In office 1946–1947
- Preceded by: Eduardo Ávalos
- Succeeded by: Oscar Nicolini

President of the Club Atlético Independiente 1919-1920 1922-1933 1942-1945

Personal details
- Born: Pedro Diego Canaveri Telechea; November 12, 1891 Ramallo, Buenos Aires, Argentina
- Died: Unknown Buenos Aires, Argentina
- Resting place: Cementerio de Avellaneda
- Party: Radical Civic Union
- Spouse: Mercedes Leira
- Occupation: manager politician

Pedro Canaveri (1891-?) was an Argentine politician and sports manager. He was member of the board of directors and president of the Club Atlético Independiente. In 1946, Canaveri was elected to the post of president of the Argentine Football Association.

== Biography ==
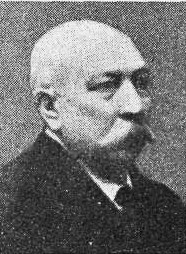
His father, Pedro Canaveri Rodríguez.

Canaveri was born in Ramallo, Buenos Aires, son of Pedro Canaveris and María Telechea, belonging to a family of French Basque roots. His father a Creole of Irish descent, belonged to a family of tanners from the southern area of Barracas.

In 1919, Pedro Canaveri began his career as president of the Club Atlético Independiente, where he was responsible for construction of the first concrete stadium in South America. He was the president of the institution of Avellaneda in the years 1919, 1922-1933 and 1942-1945. In 1931, he carried out a project to divide the thirty four teams of First division into three sections, A. B. C.

In 1946 Pedro Canaveri was appointed president of the Argentine Football Association, succeeding Eduardo Ávalos. He only remained in office until 1947. After of the Revolución Libertadora, Canaveri was appointed as a member of the Controller Commission of AFA, presided at that time by Arturo A. Bullrich.

Pedro Canaveri was married on June 26, 1920 with Mercedes Leira, daughter of José Leira and Mercedes Salgado, belonging to a Spanish family originally from A Coruña. He was cousin of Zoilo Canaveri, a famous Argentine Uruguayan soccer player, who played in Racing Club de Avellaneda and Club Atlético Independiente.
