= 1917 in Argentine football =

Football in Argentina
- Season: 1917

Men's football
- Primera División: Racing Club
- Intermedia: Def. Belgrano
- Segunda División: Sp. Palermo
- Tercera División: San Lorenzo (Note: Reserve team.)
- Copa de Honor: Racing Club
- Copa de Competencia: Independiente
- Copa Ibarguren: Racing Club

1917 in Argentine football saw the two teams from Avellaneda dominate Argentine football. Racing Club won its fifth consecutive league title and two domestic cups, while Independiente won the Copa de Competencia Jockey Club.

In international football Argentina won three minor tournaments but finished as runners up to Uruguay in Copa América for the second time.

== Primera División ==
Sportivo Barracas made its debut in Primera División, while Gimnasia y Esgrima (BA) and Banfield were relegated at the end of the season.

=== Final standings ===
Pos	Team	Pts	G	W	D	L	Gf	Ga	Gd
1	Racing Club	35	20	16	3	1	58	4	+54
2	River Plate	30	20	12	6	2	35	14	+21
3	Huracán	28	20	11	6	3	42	15	+27
4	Boca Juniors	28	20	10	8	2	42	23	+19
5	Sportivo Barracas	21	20	6	9	5	25	22	+3
6	Estudiantes (LP)	21	20	8	5	7	28	28	0
7	Estudiantil Porteño	21	20	6	9	5	26	26	0
8	Independiente	20	20	7	6	7	29	24	+5
9	San Isidro	20	20	7	6	7	31	35	-4
10	Gimnasia y Esgrima (LP)	19	20	4	11	5	19	24	-5
11	Ferro Carril Oeste	19	20	6	7	7	18	24	-6
12	San Lorenzo	18	20	6	6	8	29	27	+2
13	Porteño	18	20	7	4	9	20	30	-10
14	Columbian	18	20	8	2	10	18	35	-17
15	Platense	17	20	4	9	7	21	26	-5
16	Atlanta	16	20	6	4	10	29	41	-12
17	Tigre	16	20	6	4	10	23	36	-13
18	Argentino de Quilmes	16	20	6	4	10	21	37	-16
19	Estudiantes (BA)	15	20	6	3	11	25	31	-6
20	Gimnasia y Esgrima (BA)	12	20	4	4	12	23	44	-21
21	Banfield	12	20	4	4	12	17	33	-16

Champion
Relegated

== Lower divisions ==
=== Intermedia ===
- Champion: Defensores de Belgrano

=== Segunda División ===
- Champion: Sportivo Palermo

=== Tercera División ===
- Champion: San Lorenzo

== Domestic cups ==
=== Copa de Honor Municipalidad de Buenos Aires ===
- Champion: Racing Club

==== Final ====
6 January 1918

Racing Club	3–1 (aet)	River Plate
Perinetti; Marcovecchio	Report	J. Taggino

Racing Club

=== Copa de Competencia Jockey Club ===
- Champion: Independiente

==== Final ====
13 January 1918

Independiente	2–1 (aet)	Estudiantes (LP)
G. Galeano; Cánepa	Report	Calandra

Independiente

=== Copa Ibarguren ===
- Champion: Racing Club

==== Final ====
3 January 1918

Racing Club	3–2	Rosario Central
J. Perinetti; Marcovecchio; N. Perinetti	Report	Blanco; Clarke

Gimnasia y Esgrima (BA)

== International cups ==
=== Tie Cup ===
- Champions: (Uruguay) Wandereres

==== Final ====
21 April 1918
(Argentina) Independiente	0–4	(Uruguay) Wanderers

=== Copa de Honor Cousenier ===
- Champions: (Uruguay) Nacional

==== Final ====
31 April 1918
(Uruguay) Nacional	3–1	(Argentina) Racing Club

=== Copa Dr. Ricardo C. Aldao ===
- Champions: (Argentina) Racing Club

==== Final ====
19 April 1918
(Uruguay) Nacional	2–2	(Uruguay) Racing Club

Replay

9 July 1918
(Argentina) Racing Club	2–1	(Uruguay) Nacional

== Argentina national team ==
=== Copa América ===
Argentina travelled to Uruguay to participate in the 2nd edition of Copa América. For the second time they finished in second place behind Uruguay.

=== Titles ===
- Copa Círculo de la Prensa 1917
- Copa Lipton 1917
- Copa Premier Honor Uruguayo 1917

=== Results ===
Date	Venue	Opponents	Score	Competition	Argentina scorers	Match Report(s)
18 July 1917	Montevideo	Uruguay	0 - 2	Copa Premier Honor Uruguayo
15 August 1917	Avellaneda	Uruguay	1 - 0	Copa Lipton
2 September 1917	Montevideo	Uruguay	1 - 0	Copa Newton
3 October 1917	Montevideo	Brazil	4 - 2	Copa América 1917	Calomino, Ohaco 2, Blanco
6 October 1917	Montevideo	Chile	1 - 0	Copa América 1917	L. García og
14 October 1917	Montevideo	Uruguay	1 - 0	Copa América 1917
21 October 1917	Avellaneda	Chile	1 - 1	Friendly
