= Manuel Deluchi =

Argentine footballer

Personal information
- Full name: Juan Manuel Deluchi
- Date of birth: 1880s
- Place of birth: Buenos Aires, Argentina
- Date of death: ?
- Place of death: Buenos Aires, Argentina
- Position: Defender

Youth career
- 1900–1907: Racing

Senior career*
Years	Team	Apps	(Gls)
1908–1912	Independiente		
- * Club domestic league appearances and goals

Manuel Deluchi (born c. 1884) was an Argentine footballer who played as a defender for Racing Club de Avellaneda and Club Atlético Independiente.

== Career ==
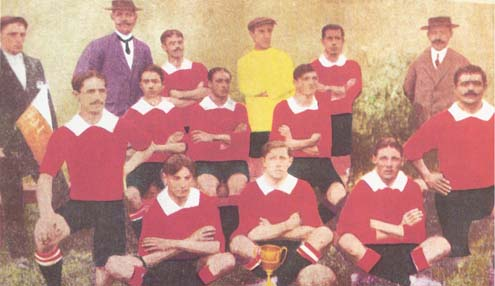
Independiente team 1908, Champions of Bullrich cup

He began his career in the early 1900s at Racing Club. On June 9, 1907, Deluchi played in his first derby between Racing and Independiente. The match result was 3–2 in favor of Independiente. In 1908, Deluchi started playing for Club Atlético Independiente, team where he won the Copa Bullrich of 1909. In 1912, he ascended to the first division. The same year, Independiente lost the Championship against Club Atlético Porteño.
