= 1915 in Argentine football =

Football in Argentina
- Season: 1915

1915 in Argentine football saw the reunification of the Asociación Argentina de Football and the Federación Argentina de Football. Racing won its third consecutive league championship.

Rosario Central won the Copa Ibarguren, defeating Racing 3-1.

Argentina national team won the Copa Premier Honor Uruguayo and Copa Lipton.

== Primera División ==
The reunification of the Asociación Argentina de Football and the Federación Argentina de Football brought the creation of a championship of 25 teams. The tournament took a league format with each team playing the others once. San Lorenzo de Almagro debuted at Primera División after promoting the last year, which caused all the "big five" to meet in a championship for the first time.

The top two teams finished even on points, which necessitated a championship playoff, which was won by Racing Club.

=== Asociación Argentina de Football - Copa Campeonato ===
Pos	Team	Pts	G	W	D	L	Gf	Ga	Gd
1	Racing Club	46	24	22	2	0	95	5	+90
2	San Isidro	46	24	22	2	0	72	12	+60
3	River Plate	38	24	16	6	2	58	17	+41
4	Porteño	36	24	17	2	5	57	26	+31
5	Platense	32	24	14	4	6	43	26	+17
6	Estudiantes (LP)	32	24	13	6	5	45	29	+16
7	Huracán	28	24	11	6	7	40	26	+14
8	Independiente	27	24	11	5	8	40	22	+18
9	Estudiantes (BA)	27	24	12	3	9	38	33	+5
10	Ferro Carril Oeste	24	24	8	8	8	38	32	+6
11	Argentino de Quilmes	24	24	11	2	11	32	43	-11
12	Gimnasia y Esgrima (BA)	23	24	9	5	10	39	43	-4
13	San Lorenzo	23	24	10	3	11	38	46	-8
14	Boca Juniors	22	24	8	6	10	32	38	-6
15	Banfield	21	24	9	3	12	33	44	-11
16	Quilmes	21	24	7	7	10	19	26	-7
17	Hispano Argentino	20	24	8	4	12	39	50	-11
18	Tigre	20	24	8	4	12	21	40	-19
19	Estudiantil Porteño	19	24	9	1	14	38	57	-19
20	Belgrano AC	18	24	8	2	14	32	47	-15
21	Atlanta	15	24	7	1	16	18	53	-35
22	Kimberley AC (BA)	14	24	5	4	15	23	45	-22
23	Defensores de Belgrano	12	24	4	4	16	26	57	-31
24	Comercio	7	24	2	3	19	23	77	-54
25	Floresta	5	24	1	3	20	15	60	-45

=== Championship playoff ===
Racing Club de Avellaneda and San Isidro finished even on points at the top of the table, necessitating a championship playoff, where Racing won its third consecutive title.

==== Final ====
Racing Club	1-0	San Isidro
(Marcovecchio)

Independiente
Champion
Relegated

== Lower divisions ==
=== Primera B ===
- Champion: Gimnasia y Esgrima (LP)

=== Primera C ===
- Champion: Martínez

== Domestic cups ==
=== Copa de Honor Municipalidad de Buenos Aires ===
- Champion: Racing Club

==== Final ====
Racing Club	2-1	Tiro Federal

Palermo

=== Copa de Competencia Jockey Club ===
- Champion: Porteño

==== Final ====
Porteño	2-1	Racing Club
(Martín Garat, Carlos Izaguirre)		(Alberto Ohaco)

Palermo

=== Copa Ibarguren ===
- Champion: Rosario Central

==== Final ====
26 March 1916

Rosario Central	0-0	Racing Club

Independiente

==== Playoff ====
30 April 1916

Rosario Central	3-1	Racing Club
(Laiolo 11, 96, Woodward 119)		(Vivaldi 15)

Gimnasia y Esgrima (BA)

== International cups ==
=== Tie Cup ===
- Champion: (Uruguay) Nacional

==== Final ====
31 October 1915

(Uruguay) Nacional	2-0	(Argentina) Porteño

Buenos Aires

=== Copa de Honor Cousenier ===
- Champion: (Uruguay) Nacional

==== Final ====
14 November 1915

(Uruguay) Nacional	2-0	(Argentina) Racing Club
(P. Dacal, A. Romano)

Parque Central
(Montevideo)

== Argentina national team ==
=== Titles ===
- Copa Lipton 1915
- Copa Premier Honor Uruguayo 1915

=== Results ===
Date	Venue	Opponents	Score	Competition	Argentina scorers	Match Report(s)
18 July 1915	Montevideo	Uruguay	2 - 3	Copa Premier Honor Uruguayo
15 August 1915	Buenos Aires	Uruguay	2 - 1	Copa Lipton
12 September 1915	Montevideo	Uruguay	2 - 0	Copa Newton
