= Creole football =

Latin American form of football

Creole Football (fútbol criollo) was the name given to the football played by the people of Latin America, shortly after the introduction of the game by the British.

== History ==
The game was introduced to Latin America in the late 19th century by British immigrants. In Argentina many of these immigrants had arrived to work on the construction of the Argentine Railway network. This British heritage is reflected in the names of many Argentine clubs including Alumni Athletic Club, Newell's Old Boys, River Plate and Boca Juniors.

The British clubs had a policy of exclusion towards the local "creole" population. This led to a backlash against Quilmes Athletic Club resulting in the formation of Argentino de Quilmes, the first exclusively Argentine club to compete in the Argentine leagues.

The phrase gradually lost its significance as the British domination of the game receded due to the rising popularity of the game amongst the locals and the influx of football-playing Italian immigrants.

In recent years, the vast majority of players in the Argentine leagues have been at least second- or third-generation Argentines or players from other South American countries, such as Uruguay, Paraguay and Colombia.

== Style ==
The Creole style of football was described as being free moving and more artistic. Jennifer C. Pratt who wrote on the subject of Creole football made the following comparison:

"One of the most apparent differences between British and local players were their playing styles. The English values of gentlemanly behaviour dominated and impregnated the spirit of the game — they considered their most important aspects as strength, virility and physical stamina. The British expected to find the spirit of the gentleman behind every player. While the English prided themselves in a style that was grounded on collective discipline and common effort, the Creoles (local players) based their style on individualism and the lack of tactical sense. To the Creoles, football was a form of art, while the British executed it like machinery. One was graceful while playing and the other was more in tune with the technicalities of the sport."

Eduardo Galeano described another aspect of the Creole style of play. The purpose of the style was to "dazzle and awe". The Creole Player had to be well versed in his own footballing "language", as Galeano explains:

"the ball was strummed as if it were a guitar, a source of music."

"football players created their own language in that tiny space where they chose to retain and possess the ball rather than kick it, as if their feet were hands braiding the leather."

== See also ==
- Push and run (British style)
