= 1915 Argentine Primera División =

24th season of top-tier football league in Argentina

Primera División
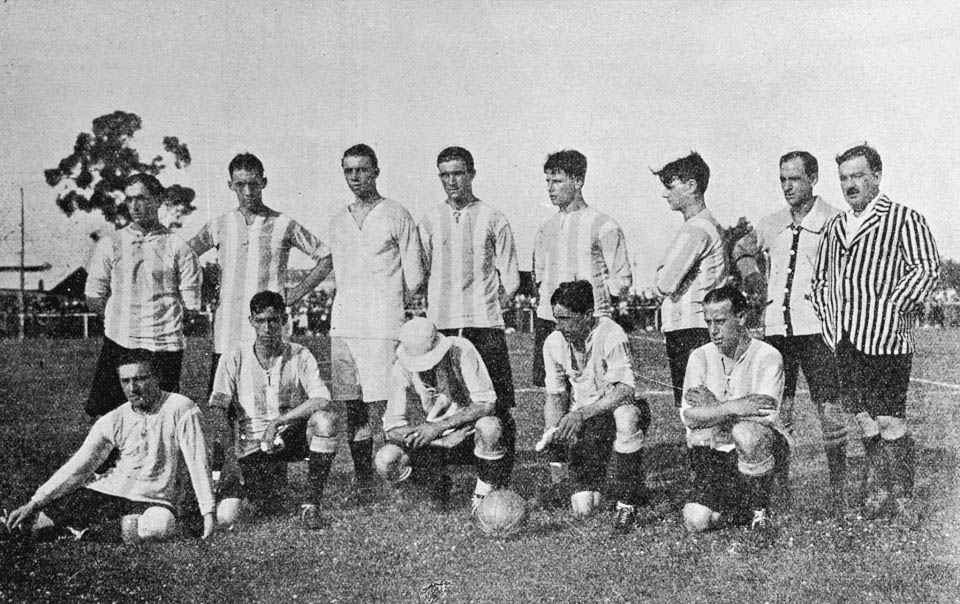
- Racing Club, champions
- Season: 1915
- Champions: Racing (3rd title)
- Promoted: San Lorenzo; Def. Belgrano
- Relegated: Kimberley; Def. Belgrano; Comercio; Floresta
- Top goalscorer: (Argentina) Alberto Ohaco (Racing) (31 goals)
- Biggest home win: River Plate 7–0 Floresta; Belgrano A.C. 7–0 Banfield; San Isidro 7–0 Boca Juniors
- Biggest away win: Argentino (Q) 1–8 Racing

The 1915 Argentine Primera División was the 24th season of top-flight football in Argentina. The season began on April 4 and ended in January 1916. The reunification of the "Asociación Argentina de Football" and the "Federación Argentina de Football" brought the creation of a championship of 25 teams. The tournament took a league format with each team playing the others once.

Clubs that made their debuts in Primera were San Lorenzo de Almagro (Segunda División (AFA) champion) and Defensores de Belgrano (División Intermedia (FAF) champion). The coming of San Lorenzo caused all the "big five" to meet in an official tournament for the first time. Racing achieved its 3° consecutive championship.

For the first time in Primera División history, four teams were relegated: Kimberley, Defensores de Belgrano, Comercio and Floresta.

== Standings ==
Pos	Team	Pld	W	D	L	GF	GA	GD	Pts
1	Racing	24	22	2	0	95	5	+90	46 (Note: The first league meeting between Avellaneda rivals Racing Club and Independiente ended 1-2 to Independiente, but the result was cancelled and the points awarded to Racing Club.)
2	San Isidro	24	22	2	0	72	12	+60	46
3	River Plate	24	16	6	2	58	17	+41	38
4	Porteño	24	17	2	5	57	26	+31	36
5	Platense	24	14	4	6	43	26	+17	32
6	Estudiantes (LP)	24	13	6	5	45	29	+16	32
7	Huracán	24	11	6	7	40	26	+14	28
8	Independiente	24	11	5	8	40	22	+18	27
9	Estudiantes (BA)	24	12	3	9	38	33	+5	27
10	Ferro Carril Oeste	24	8	8	8	38	32	+6	24
11	Argentino (Q)	24	11	2	11	32	43	−11	24
12	Gimnasia y Esgrima (BA)	24	9	5	10	39	43	−4	23
13	San Lorenzo	24	10	3	11	38	46	−8	23
14	Boca Juniors	24	8	6	10	32	38	−6	22
15	Banfield	24	9	3	12	33	44	−11	21 (Note: Banfield had two results cancelled and the points awarded to their opponents)
16	Quilmes	24	7	7	10	19	26	−7	21
17	Hispano Argentino	24	8	4	12	39	50	−11	20
18	Tigre	24	8	4	12	21	40	−19	20
19	Estudiantil Porteño	24	9	1	14	38	57	−19	19
20	Belgrano A.C.	24	8	2	14	32	47	−15	18
21	Atlanta	24	7	1	16	18	53	−35	15
22	Kimberley (R)	24	5	4	15	23	45	−22	14
23	Defensores de Belgrano (R)	24	4	4	16	26	57	−31	12
24	Comercio (R)	24	2	3	19	23	77	−54	7
25	Floresta (R)	24	1	3	20	15	60	−45	5

(R) Relegated

=== Championship playoff ===
Racing and San Isidro finished level on points at the top of the table, necessitating a championship playoff, where Racing won their 3rd. consecutive league title.

Date	Team 1	Res.	Team 2	Venue	City
6 Jan 1916	Racing	1–0	San Isidro	Independiente	Avellaneda
