= 1918 in Argentine football =

Football in Argentina
- Season: 1918

1918 in Argentine football saw Racing Club de Avellaneda win its 6th. consecutive league title, remaining unbeaten at the end of the season.

In international football Argentina won three minor championships.

== Primera División ==
Defensores de Belgrano debuted in Primera after promoting last year, while Argentino de Quilmes and Ferro Carril Oeste (which was also expelled from the Association) were relegated.

Pos	Team	Pts	G	W	D	L	Gf	Ga	Gd
1	Racing Club	36	19	17	2	0	49	9	+40
2	River Plate	25	19	9	7	3	30	17	+13
3	Boca Juniors	24	19	9	6	4	39	21	+18
4	San Isidro	24	19	10	4	5	35	23	+12
5	Sportivo Barracas	21	19	9	3	7	22	21	+1
6	Gimnasia y Esgrima (LP)	20	19	7	6	6	21	22	-1
7	Estudiantes (LP)	20	19	7	6	6	19	25	-6
8	Huracán	19	19	5	9	5	25	19	+6
9	Independiente	18	19	8	2	9	30	28	+2
10	Estudiantil Porteño	18	19	6	6	7	23	22	+1
11	Porteño	18	19	7	4	8	21	29	-8
12	Platense	18	19	7	4	8	14	22	-8
13	San Lorenzo	17	19	6	5	8	20	23	-3
14	Tigre	17	19	7	3	9	27	32	-5
15	Estudiantes (BA)	17	19	5	7	7	26	31	-5
16	Defensores de Belgrano	17	19	6	5	8	24	32	-8
17	Atlanta	16	19	5	6	8	25	34	-9
18	Columbian	15	19	5	5	9	20	27	-12
19	Ferro Carril Oeste	13	19	2	9	8	9	23	-14
20	Argentino de Quilmes	7	19	1	5	13	9	28	-19

Champion
Relegated

== Lower divisions ==
=== Intermedia ===
- Champion: Eureka

=== Segunda División ===
- Champion: San Fernando

== Domestic cups ==
=== Copa de Honor Municipalidad de Buenos Aires ===
- Champion: Independiente

==== Final ====
1918

Independiente	1-0	Platense

Palermo

=== Copa de Competencia Jockey Club ===
- Champion: Porteño

==== Final ====
1918

Porteño	2-1	River Plate

Palermo

=== Copa Ibarguren ===
- Champion: Racing Club

==== Final ====
24 November 1918

Racing Club	4-0	Newell's
(Vivaldo, N. Perinetti 2, Zavaleta])

Gimnasia y Esgrima (BA)

== International cups ==
=== Tie Cup ===
- Champion: (Uruguay) Wanderers

==== Final ====
1 December 1918

Wanderers (Uruguay)	2-1	(Argentina) Porteño
	Report

Palermo

=== Copa de Honor Cousenier ===
- Champion: (Uruguay) Peñarol

==== Final ====
1 December 1918

Peñarol (Uruguay)	4-0	(Argentina) Independiente
	Report

Montevideo

=== Copa Dr. Ricardo C. Aldao ===
- Champion: (Argentina) Racing Club

==== Final ====
5 January 1919

Racing Club (Argentina)	2-1	(Uruguay) Peñarol
	Report

Racing Club

== Argentina national team ==
=== Titles ===
- Copa Lipton 1918
- Copa Newton 1918
- Copa Premier Honor Argentino 1918

=== Results ===
Date	Venue	Opponents	Score	Competition	Argentina scorers	Match Report(s)
18 July 1918	Montevideo	Uruguay	1 - 1	Copa Premier Honor Uruguayo
28 July 1918	Montevideo	Uruguay	3 - 1	Copa Premier Honor Uruguayo
15 August 1918	Buenos Aires	Uruguay	0 - 0	Copa Premier Honor Argentino
25 August 1918	Buenos Aires	Uruguay	2 - 1	Copa Premier Honor Argentino
20 September 1918	Montevideo	Uruguay	1 - 1	Copa Lipton
29 September 1918	Buenos Aires	Uruguay	2 - 0	Copa Newton
