= Sam Strettle =

English footballer

Personal information
- Full name: Samuel Strettle
- Date of birth: 2 February 1886
- Place of birth: Latchford, England
- Date of death: 25 August 1926 (aged 40)
- Place of death: Weaverham, England
- Height: 5 ft 11 1/2 in (1.82 m)
- Position: Full back

Senior career*
Years	Team	Apps	(Gls)
1907–1909	Everton	4	(0)
1909–1913	Chesterfield Town	129	(7)
1913–1920	Exeter City	108	
- Monks Hall
- Northwich Victoria
- Llandudno
- * Club domestic league appearances and goals

Samuel Strettle MM (2 February 1886 – 25 August 1926) was an English professional footballer who made over 120 appearances in the Midland League for Chesterfield Town as a full back. He also played for Everton in the Football League and made over 100 appearances in the Southern League for Exeter City.

== Personal life ==
Strettle was married with one child. He served as a lance corporal in the 58th (2/1st London) Division Signal Company of the Royal Engineers during the First World War and was awarded the Military Medal during the course of his service. Strettle died of tuberculosis at Hefferston Grange Sanatorium in 1926 and was buried in Warrington Cemetery.

== Career statistics ==
Appearances and goals by club, season and competition
Club	Season	League			FA Cup		Other		Total	
Club	Season	Division	Apps	Goals	Apps	Goals	Apps	Goals	Apps	Goals
Everton	1906–07	First Division	2	0	0	0	—		2	0
Everton	1907–08	First Division	1	0	0	0	—		1	0
Everton	1908–09	First Division	1	0	0	0	—		1	0
Everton	Total		4	0	0	0	—		4	0
Chesterfield Town	1909–10	Midland League	38	4	4	1	1 (Note: Appearances in Derbyshire Senior Cup)	0	43	5
Chesterfield Town	1910–11	Midland League	32	2	4	0	4	0	40	2
Chesterfield Town	1911–12	Midland League	29	1	1	0	—		30	1
Chesterfield Town	1912–13	Midland League	30	0	3	0	1	0	34	0
Chesterfield Town	Total		129	7	12	1	6	0	147	8
Exeter City	1914–15	Southern League First Division	38	0	0	0	—		38	0
Career total			171	7	12	1	6	0	189	8
