= 1916 in Argentine football =

Football in Argentina
- Season: 1916

Men's football
- Primera División: Racing Club
- Intermedia: Sp. Barracas
- Segunda División: Huracán III (Note: Reserve teams.)
- Tercera División: Porteño
- Copa de Honor: Rosario Central
- Copa de Competencia: Rosario Central
- Copa Ibarguren: Racing Club

1916 in Argentine football saw Racing Club win their 4th consecutive league championship. Rosario Central won the Copa de Honor and the Copa de Competencia but they were beaten in both of the international finals.

In international football Argentina hosted the first edition of Copa América (named "Campeonato Sudamericano" by then) where they finished as runners un to Uruguay although they won four minor trophies later in the year.

== Primera División ==
=== Final standings ===
Pos	Team	Pts	G	W	D	L	Gf	Ga	Gd
1	Racing Club	34	21	15	4	2	39	10	+29
2	Platense	30	21	12	6	3	25	13	+12
3	River Plate	29	21	10	9	2	27	10	+17
4	Gimnasia y Esgrima (LP)	27	21	9	9	3	21	12	+9
5	Huracán	26	21	11	4	6	31	16	+15
6	Estudiantil Porteño	26	21	10	6	5	37	22	+15
7	San Lorenzo	23	21	9	5	7	16	25	-9
8	Porteño	22	21	7	8	6	32	26	+6
9	Gimnasia y Esgrima (BA)	21	21	8	5	8	31	29	+2
10	Tigre	21	21	8	5	8	22	28	-6
11	Argentino de Quilmes	20	21	7	6	8	25	23	+2
12	Estudiantes (LP)	20	21	6	8	7	26	26	0
13	San Isidro	20	21	7	6	8	29	32	-3
14	Boca Juniors	20	21	7	6	8	25	29	-4
15	Independiente	20	21	6	8	7	13	17	-4
16	Columbian	19	21	6	7	8	24	26	-2
17	Atlanta	17	21	5	7	9	17	24	-7
18	Banfield	16	21	4	8	9	20	31	-11
19	Estudiantes (BA)	15	21	5	5	11	27	33	-6
20	Ferro Carril Oeste	15	21	6	3	12	28	39	-11
21	Belgrano AC	13	21	5	3	13	20	40	-20
22	Quilmes	8	21	2	4	15	12	36	-24

Champion
Relegated

== Lower divisions ==
=== Intermedia ===
- Champion: Sportivo Barracas

=== Segunda División ===
- Champion: Huracán III

== Domestic Cups ==
=== Copa de Honor Municipalidad de Buenos Aires ===
==== Final ====
Rosario Central 1-0 Independiente

=== Copa de Competencia Jockey Club ===
==== Final ====
Rosario Central 2-1 Independiente

=== Copa Ibarguren ===
==== Final ====
Racing Club 6-0 Rosario Central

(3rd title)

== International cups ==
=== Tie Cup ===
- Champions: (Uruguay) Peñarol

==== Final ====
24 December 1916
(Argentina) Rosario Central	0–3	(Uruguay) Peñarol

=== Copa de Honor Cousenier ===
- Champions: (Uruguay) Nacional (3rd title)

==== Final ====
10 December 1916
(Uruguay) Nacional	6–1	(Argentina) Rosario Central

=== Copa Dr. Ricardo C. Aldao ===
- Champions: (Uruguay) Nacional

==== Final ====
3 December 1916
(Argentina) Racing Club	1–2	(Uruguay) Nacional

== Argentina national team ==
To commemorate the centennial of the Declaration of Independence, Argentina hosted and participated in the first edition of the 1916 South American Championship, later named Copa América. Argentina finished as runners-up to Uruguay.

The national squad won the Copa Círculo de la Prensa, Copa Lipton, Copa Newton and Copa Premier Honor Uruguayo that year.

=== Copa Lipton ===
15 August

Argentina	2-1	Uruguay
	Report

Montevideo

=== Copa Newton ===
15 August

Argentina	3-1	Uruguay
	Report

Avellaneda

=== Copa Premier Honor Uruguayo ===
1 October

Argentina	1-0	Uruguay
	Report

Montevideo

=== Results ===
Date	Venue	Rival	Score	Competition	Arg. scorers
6 July 1916	Buenos Aires	Chile	6–1	1916 Copa América	Ohaco 2, J.D. Brown 2, Marcovecchio 2
10 July 1916	Buenos Aires	Brazil	1–1	1916 Copa América	J. Laguna
12 July 1916	Buenos Aires	Chile	1–0	Friendly	
17 July 1916	Avellaneda	Uruguay	0–0	1916 Copa América	
15 August 1916	Montevideo	Uruguay	2–1	Copa Lipton	
15 August 1916	Avellaneda	Uruguay	3–1	Copa Newton	
1 October 1916	Montevideo	Uruguay	1–0	Copa Premier Honor Uruguayo	
1 October 1916	Avellaneda	Uruguay	7–2	Copa Círculo de la Prensa	
29 October 1916	Montevideo	Uruguay	1–3	Copa Círculo de la Prensa	
