= Zenón Díaz =

Argentine footballer

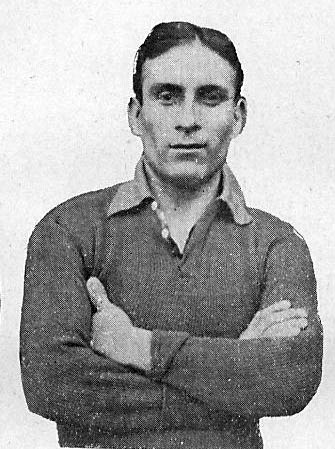

Personal information
- Date of birth: 8 February 1881
- Place of birth: San Marcos, Córdoba, Argentina
- Date of death: 5 September 1948 (aged 67)
- Place of death: Rosario, Santa Fe, Argentina
- Position: Defender

Senior career*
| Years | Team | Apps | (Gls) |
| 1903–1919 | Rosario Central | | |

International career
| 1905–1916 | Argentina | 10 | (0) |
Medal record
Men's football
Representing Argentina
South American Championship
| Runner-up | 1916 Argentina |
- * Club domestic league appearances and goals

Zenón Díaz (31 December 1880 – 5 September 1948) was an Argentine footballer who played as a defender for Rosario Central, where he won four national cups.

== Club career ==
Díaz started playing as goalkeeper for Rosario Central after he was discovered by two club executives who had watched him playing la ronda in the streets. Those executives had been impressed by Díaz's ability to use hands. He debuted as goalkeeper in a match against Rosario A.C. in 1903, which Central lost 2–1. Nevertheless, Díaz did not remain playing as a goalkeeper much longer because he preferred to play in a position where he could run.

As a defender, Díaz consolidated as one of the most famous players of his time. Díaz played for Rosario Central from 1903 to 1919, when he retired after a match against the arch-rival Newell's Old Boys on 4 May. Notably, Díaz played the last minutes as goalkeeper, replacing his nephew Octavio Díaz, who had left the field after being injured.

Díaz played at least 175 games and scored at least eight goals, winning four national cups and seven regional titles with Rosario Central. Like other players during the amateur era, he also worked at the Central Argentine Railway. Díaz's playing style was based on tough man-marking, and he was known for his slide tackles.

== International career ==
With the Argentina national team, he debuted against the English club Nottingham Forest during their 1905 tour of South America. His last match with Argentina was at the 1916 South American Championship against Uruguay. Díaz was the first Argentine native (non-British origin) player to be capped for the national team.

== After retirement ==
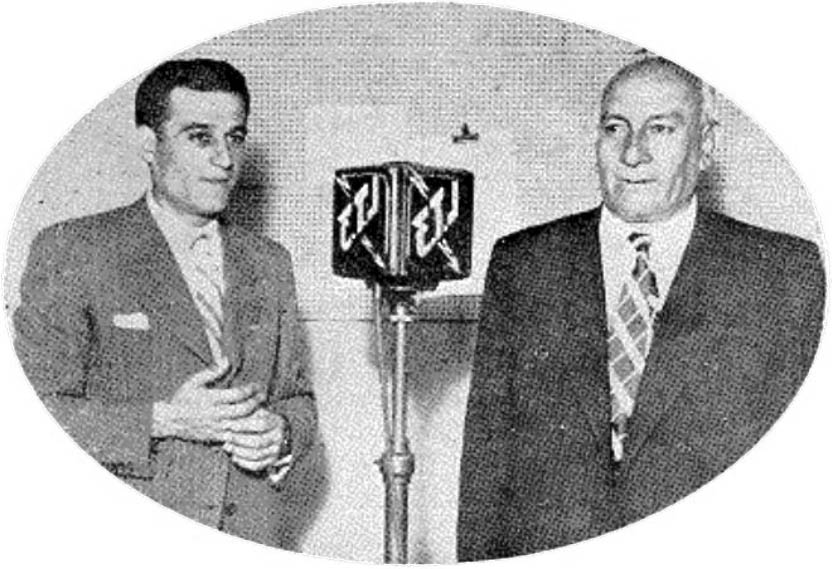
Díaz (right) with his son Oscar in a radio broadcast to commemorate Rosario Central's 50th. anniversary, 1939

Díaz attended the celebration of the 50th. anniversary of Club Rosario Central held in 1939, being honored by the club as one of its most notable players. He was also the flag bearer during the ceremony. Díaz also participated in the radio program La Voz del Deporte ("the voice of sports") where he was part of a special edition to commemorate the 50th. anniversary.

Zenón Díaz died on 5 September 1948, after battling against a disease.

== Honours ==
Rosario Central

- Copa de Competencia La Nación: 1913
- Copa Ibarguren: 1915
- Copa de Competencia Jockey Club: 1916
- Copa Honor MCBA: 1916
- Copa Nicasio Vila (6): 1908, 1914, 1915, 1916, 1917, 1919
- Federación Rosarina de Football: 1913
- Copa Damas de Caridad: 1910, 1914, 1915, 1916

Argentina

- Copa Lipton: 1906
- Copa Premier Honor Argentino: 1913
- Copa Newton: 1916
- Copa Premier Honor Uruguayo: 1916
