= Estadio Racing Club =

Football stadium in Avellaneda, Argentina

Alsina and Colón Stadium
- Estadio de Alsina y Colón
- La Feria (The Fair)
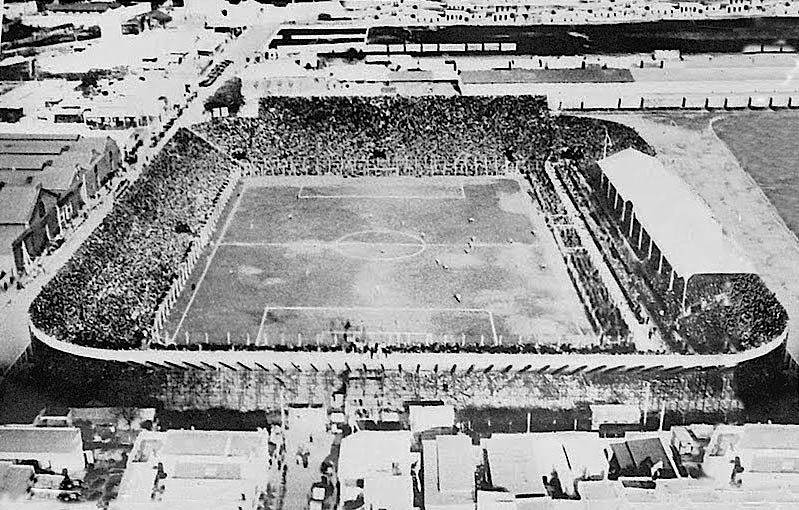
- The stadium in 1939
- Interactive map of Alsina and Colón Stadium
- Full name: Estadio de Racing Club
- Location: Alsina and Colón, Avellaneda, Argentina
- Owner: Buenos Aires Great Southern Railway
- Operator: Racing Club
- Capacity: 50,000
- Type: Stadium
- Event: Sporting events
- Surface: Grass
- Field size: 105 x 85 m

Construction
- Opened: 1906
- Renovated: 1928–29
- Closed: December 1946; 79 years ago
- Demolished: 1948

Tenants
- Racing Club (1904–46); Argentina national team (1912–17, 1923)

The Estadio de Alsina y Colón (Spanish pronunciation: [esˈtaðjo dˈe alsˈina ˈi kolˈon]; lit. 'Alsina and Colón Stadium', named after the Alsina and Colón streets), officially known as Estadio de Racing Club (Spanish pronunciation: [esˈtaðjo dˈe ɾɾˈaθiŋ klˈub]; lit. 'Racing Club Stadium', as it was the home of the team), was an association football stadium in Avellaneda, Argentina. It was the home of Racing, before the club moved to the current El Cilindro, located on the same site.

The stadium held 50,000 spectators. It was one of two stadiums that hosted the first Copa América in 1916, along with GEBA Stadium.

== History ==
After spending some time in other locations, Racing Club returned to Alsina and Colón streets in 1906. The stadium hosted not only football matches but other sporting events. On May 7, 1911, Racing debuted in Primera División playing in "Alsina y Colón" vs San Isidro, becoming the first Racing's top division match held in that venue. By those times, the club built the roof grandstands.

One of Racing's achievements in that stadium was the win over legendary team Alumni 3–1. That was the last season of Alumni in Argentine football so the club disbanded soon after. Racing is considered the "successor" of Alumni due to their successful campaigns in upcoming years during the second decade of the 20th. century. Some journalist state that Racing gave birth to the "creole style", opposing to Alumni's British school that dominated the first years of the century.

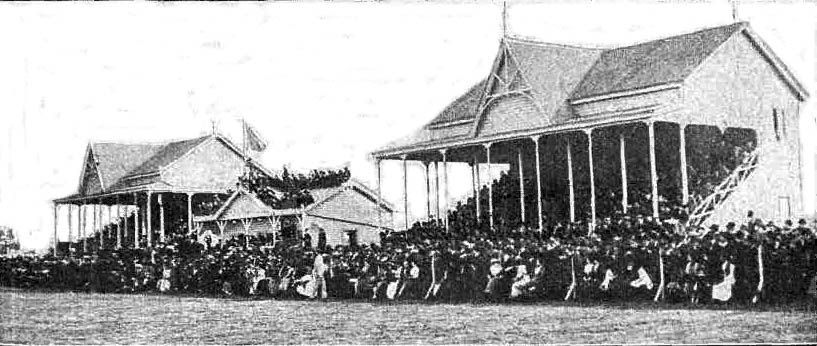
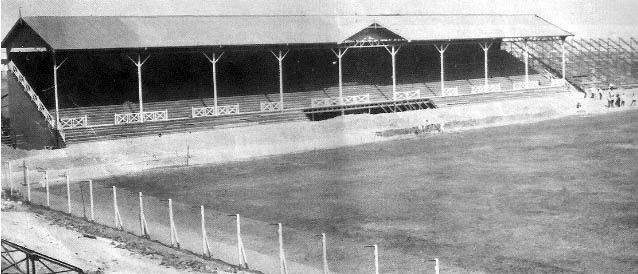
Two moments of the official grandstand, (above): in May 1911; (below): in 1929

By those times, the Argentina national team played their home games at Gimnasia y Esgrima's venue, Estadio GEBA When the club broke up with the Argentine Football Association to establish Federación Argentina de Football in 1912, the official Association decided that Argentine would play their games at Racing Club, which was the second stadium in importance by then. The first match played by the Argentine side in Racing was the 1912 edition of Copa Newton (held on October 6) v Uruguay.

As football gained more enthusiasts, the club built more grandstands on Alsina and Italia streets to increase the stadium's capacity. In 1913, Argentina played a Copa Lipton match at Racing Club, beating Uruguay 4–0. That same year, Racing achieved its first title in Primera División after beating San Isidro 2–0 in the final match.

Racing also hosted some matches played by English club Exeter City during their tour to South America in 1914, Exeter City played a total of six games at Racing Club against local combined teams and Racing itself. Italian club Torino also played some friendly matches at Racing that same year.

On 17 July 1916, the last match of the 1916 South American Championship (the first continental competition organised by Conmebol was held in Racing Club, when Argentina and Uruguay tied 0–0. The match was scheduled to be played at GEBA one day before, but the huge number of fans (30,000) that had gone to Palermo surpassed the capacity of the stadium (about 20,000) and the match was suspended. Showing their anger at the decision, some spectators burned down the grandstands. Therefore, the match was re-programmed for the next day at Racing Club.

Racing Club was the frequent venue for international games until 1918 when GEBA was re-opened. In 1922, the grandstand was built, increasing the capacity to 30,000 spectators. The stadium was refurbished again between 1928 and 1928, increasing its capacity to 50,000 spectators. The stadium grounds, which were owned by the Buenos Aires Great Southern Railway, were acquired by Racing in 1944. Two years later it was granted a loan to build a new stadium made of concrete. The last official match played at Alsina y Colón was on 1 December 1946, when Racing lost to Rosario Central 6–4.

Preceded by (none)	Copa América; Last fixture venue 1916	Succeeded by Parque Pereira; Montevideo
