= Ángel Betular =

Argentine footballer

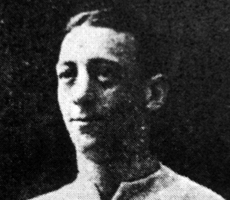

Personal information
- Date of birth: December 22, 1891
- Place of birth: Buenos Aires, Argentina
- Date of death: June 3, 1938 (aged 46)
- Place of death: Buenos Aires, Argentina
- Position: Defender

Senior career*
Years	Team	Apps	(Gls)
1909–1920	Racing		
- * Club domestic league appearances and goals

Ángel Betular (1891 – 3 June 1938) was an Argentine football player. Betular spent his entire career in Racing Club de Avellaneda, where he played as defender. Betular won 12 titles playing for Racing, including two international cups.

== Career ==
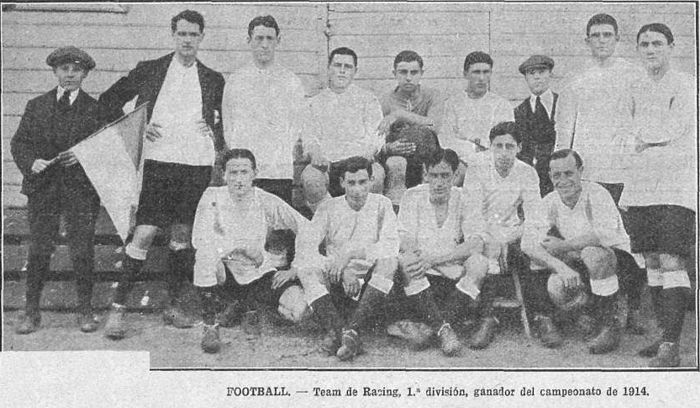
The Racing Club team of 1914, with Betular as one of its players.

Born in Buenos Aires, Betular began his player career in Racing Club. He had an elegant style of playing, combined with a fierce defense and a long-distance shooting that allowed him to score many goals. Moreover, he usually shot penalties and free kicks for his team.

In 1910 Racing won the Segunda División final against Boca Juniors, gaining promotion to the top-flight division, Primera División, with Betular being part of the winning team. Betular won several titles with Racing, playing along with notable footballers such as Zoilo Canavery, Alberto Ohaco and Alberto Marcovecchio.

In 1914 Betular played for Racing an international friendly match against Torino Football Club, with a score 1-0 for The academy.

=== Titles ===
- Primera División (5): 1913, 1914, 1915, 1916, 1917
- Copa de Honor Municipalidad de Buenos Aires (2): 1913, 1915
- Copa Ibarguren (3): 1913, 1914, 1916
- Copa de Honor Cousenier (1): 1913
- Copa Aldao (1): 1917
