= Alberto Ohaco =

Argentine footballer

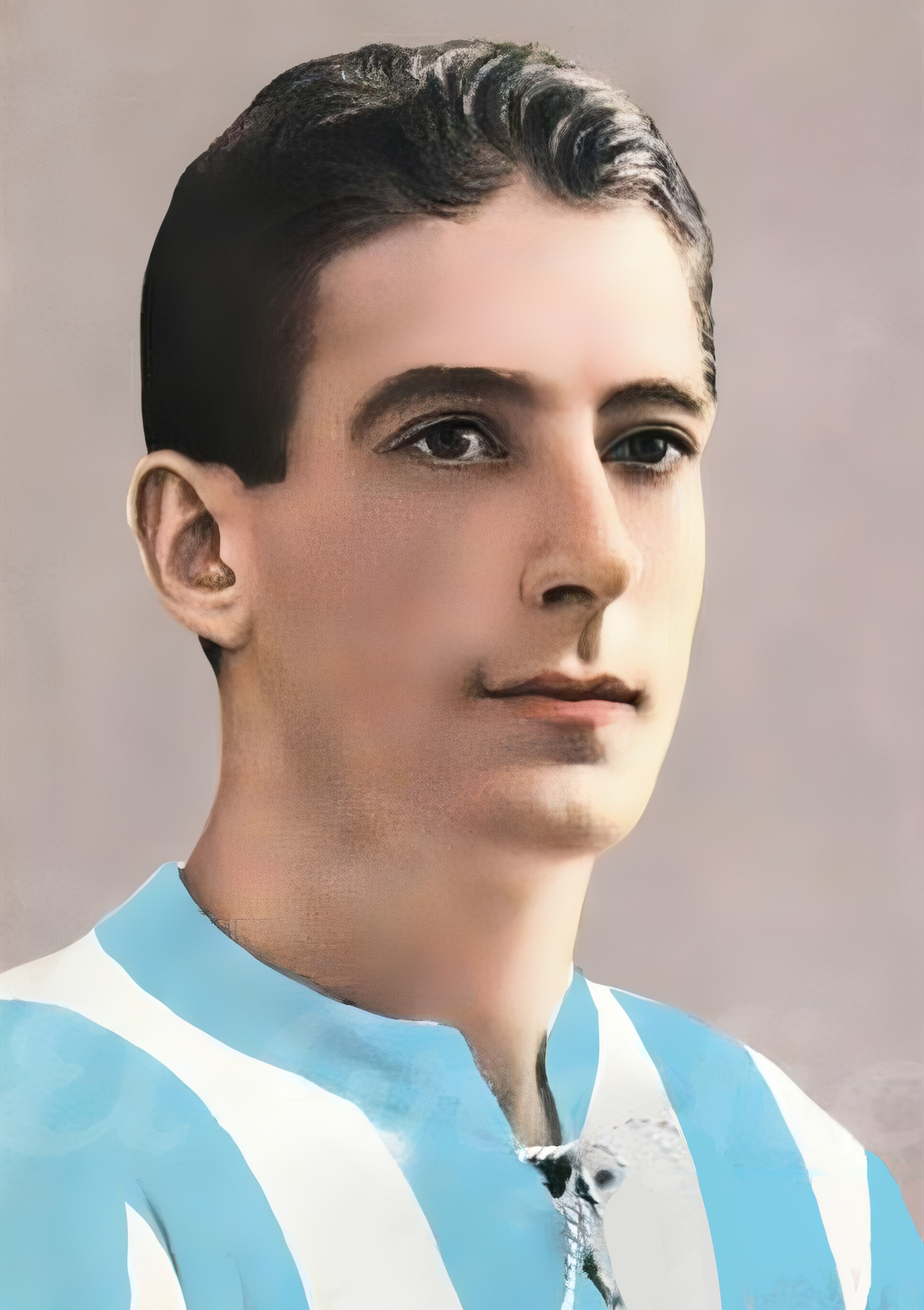

Personal information
- Full name: Alberto Juan Ohaco
- Date of birth: 12 January 1889
- Place of birth: Avellaneda, Argentina
- Date of death: 8 March 1950 (aged 61)
- Place of death: Lomas de Zamora, Argentina
- Position: Striker

Senior career*
Years	Team	Apps	(Gls)
1911–1921	Racing Club (Note: It includes 6 annulled matches.)	190	(142)

International career
1912–1918	Argentina	23	(7)
Medal record
Men's football
Representing Argentina
South American Championship
Runner-up	1916 Argentina
Runner-up	1917 Uruguay
- * Club domestic league appearances and goals as of October 2008

Alberto Ohaco (12 January 1889 – 8 March 1950) was an Argentine footballer who played for Racing Club de Avellaneda. He won seven league titles and is considered to have been one of the greatest Argentine men's footballers of all time.

Ohaco, whose father was one of the founding members of Racing Club, became one of the club's greatest players. He is one of the most winning players in Racing Club's history, having won a total of 20 titles with the club, including seven consecutive Primera División championships between 1913 and 1919. He was also the top scorer four times in the Argentine league between 1912 and 1915. In Primera División, Ohaco scored 142 goals in 190 for Racing between 1911 and 1921.

Ohaco played for the Argentina national team between 1912 and 1918, playing in the first two editions of the Copa América in 1916 and 1917.

== Titles ==
=== Club ===
Racing Club

- Primera División (8): 1913, 1914, 1915, 1916, 1917, 1918, 1919, 1921
- Copa Ibarguren (5): 1913, 1914, 1916, 1917, 1918
- Copa de Honor MCBA (4): 1912, 1913, 1915, 1917
- Copa de Honor Cousenier (1): 1913
- Copa Aldao (2): 1917, 1918
