= Liga Rosarina de Football =

Argentine association football league

Argentina
- Founded: 1905
- Folded: 1930; 96 years ago
- Headquarters: Rosario, Santa Fe
- FIFA affiliation: No
- Argentina affiliation: AFA

The Liga Rosarina de Football was the main body that organised the practice of association football in Rosario, Argentina, from 1905 to 1930. Rosario Central, Newell's Old Boys, Rosario A.C. and Atlético Argentino were its founding members.

The league was disestablished in 1930, shortly before football became professional in Argentina. Therefore the recently created Asociación Rosarina de Fútbol [es] became the main organising body in the city.

== History ==
=== Background and origins ===
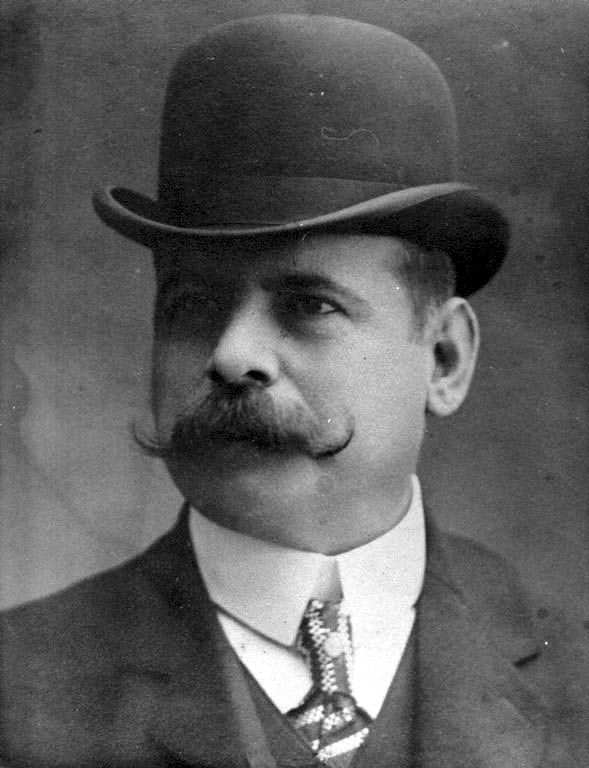
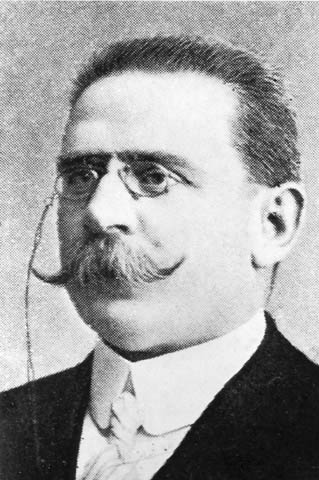
Nicasio Vila (left) and Santiago Pinasco, mayors of Rosario that donated the trophies to LRF competitions of first and second division respectively

Although the city of Rosario did not have an organised league, since 1900 the football squads of Rosario A.C. and Rosario Central had taken part in the first international tournament in South America, the Tie Cup, played by teams of Rosario, Buenos Aires and Uruguay leagues. Rosario Athletic became the first Rosarian team to win an international competition after winning the cup in 1902, defeating legendary Alumni by 2-1 in the playoff match. The squad would win two cups, in 1904 (beating Uruguayan CURCC 3-2) and 1905 (winning over CURCC again by 4-3) editions, totaling 3 championships in 6 years.

Teams from Rosario had also participated in the first national cups organised by the Argentine Football Association, such as Copa de Honor Municipalidad de Buenos Aires, (which Newell's Old Boys and Rosario Central would later win in 1911 and 1916, respectively)

=== Creation of the league ===
At the request of president of Newell's Old Boys, Víctor Heitz, other prominent teams of the city were invited to create a local league to organise a football competition. Therefore, "Liga Rosarina de Football" was established with Newell's, Rosario A.C., Rosario Central and Atlético Argentino as founding members. The body organised a second division tournament that became the first competition in Santa Fe Province. The trophy awarded to the winning team was donated by the mayor of Rosario, Santiago Pinasco, and named after him.

However, in a second meeting of the association, club representatives decided that players participating of Jockey Club would not be allowed to play at tournaments organised by Liga Rosarina. That forced Atlético del Rosario and Rosario Central to select other players to play their respective competitions. On April 26, two teams, Provincial and The Córdoba And Rosario Railway Athletic Club (current "Central Córdoba"), were added to the league. With six teams affiliated, the first local tournament was about to be played.

=== Copa Nicasio Vila ===
Due to the increasing popularity of football in Argentina –being the city of Rosario among them–, the body established a first division championship, named "Copa Nicasio Vila", named after then major of Rosario, local entrepreneur Nicasio Vila, whose first edition was won by Newell's.

The winner of Copa Nicasio Vila qualified to play the Copa Dr. Carlos Ibarguren against the champion of the Buenos Aires League (that represented the AFA First Division). The champion and the 2nd., 3rd., and 4th. were also qualified to play other AFA national cups, such as the Copa de Competencia and Copa de Honor, while Copa Pinasco remained as the second division championship.

Soon after, the Liga Rosarina also established a new competition, Copa Comercio, as a third division championship.

=== Crisis and dissolution ===
1912 was an extremely unfortunate for Rosarian football with most of the matches being interrupted due to aggressions towards the referees, teams that left the field and doubtful regulatory decisions taken by Liga Rosarina. As a result, all the championships were suspended indefinitely.

The first club that disaffiliated from the league was Club Atlético Sparta, while Tiro Federal was expelled from the association.

Later, four Rosario Central players were called up to play for a Rosarian combined team that would play Uruguay national team, they were Serapio Acosta, Ignacio Rota, Harry Hayes and Pablo Molina. Nevertheless, all of them refused to play the match alleging that teammate Zenón Díaz had not been called-up.

"Mr. Zenón Díaz has been excluded from the team due to reasons that we can't understand, despite of being one of the best defenders of the team, and its stronger support more than once".

— Letter sent to Liga Rosarina by dissident players.

After their decision, the Liga Rosarina banned the four players, considering them "rebels". In response to that, Rosario Central disaffiliated from the body. Therefore, the 1912 championship was annulled, with no champion crowned.

With the Liga Rosarina without its most popular members, a new body, Federación Rosarina de Football, was established in 1913, setting its headquarters in San Lorenzo street. Rosario Central, Tiro Federal and Sparta, apart from other clubs such as Embarcaderos Córdoba and Rosario (predecessor of current Argentino de Rosario) joined the Federación Rosarina, which also affiliated to the main body, Argentine Football Association.

In 1914 the conflicts were solved and both associations, Liga Rosarina and Federación Argentina, merged into one body. Therefore, clubs previously excluded from Liga Rosarina, took part of the 1914 edition of Copa Nicasio Vila.

Nevertheless, new conflicts came in 1920 when a group of clubs (led by Rosario Central) abandoned the Liga again, founding the "Asociación Amateurs Rosarina de Football", that only lasted for 2 years so the dissident clubs returned to the LRF. The league would be finally disbanded in 1930.

In 1931 football became professional in Argentina, with the establishment of dissident association Liga Argentina de Football formed by the most popular clubs in the country. Following that trend, the Asociación Rosarina de Fútbol [es] was created that same year to organise the first professional championships in the city of Rosario.

== See also ==
- Football in Argentina
