= Andrés Mack =

Australian-Argentine footballer

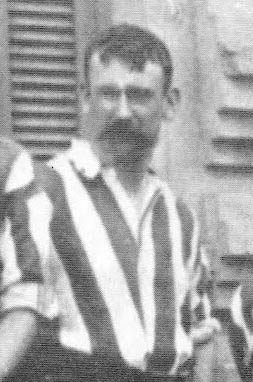
- Mack with the Alumni uniform

Personal information
- Full name: Andrés Arturo Mack
- Date of birth: 12 November 1876
- Place of birth: Canberra, Australia
- Date of death: 6 October 1936 (aged 59)
- Place of death: Vicente López, Argentina
- Height: 1.60 m (5 ft 3 in)
- Position: Midfielder

Senior career*
Years	Team	Apps	(Gls)
1900–11	Alumni		

International career
?	Argentina		
- * Club domestic league appearances and goals

Andrés Arturo Mack (sometimes nicknamed Colorado – "Red hair" in Spanish) (Canberra, 12 November 1876 – Vicente López, 6 October 1936) was an Australian-born (then naturalized Argentine) footballer who played as midfielder. Mack spent his entire career with Alumni (where he won 20 titles) and the Argentina national team.

== Biography ==
Mack arrived to Argentina in 1894 after graduating in Bachelor of Arts at the University of Cambridge. He primarily worked as a teacher of both disciplines, mathematics and sports, at the Buenos Aires English High School, the institution founded and directed by Argentine football pioneer Alexander Watson Hutton.

Apart from teaching at the School, Mack played for legendary team Alumni from 1900 until its dissolution in 1911. He also played for the Argentina national team in the first match ever recorded against Uruguay on 16 May 1901.

In 1914 Mack returned Europe while the World War I was happening. He joined Royal Army Medical Corps but he had to abandon the activity after being injured in battle. Mack returned to Buenos Aires, where he continued teaching until his death.

== Titles ==
(All of them won with Alumni):

=== National ===
- Argentine Primera División (9): 1900, 1902, 1903, 1905, 1906, 1907, 1909, 1910, 1911
- Copa de Competencia Jockey Club (3): 1907, 1908, 1909
- Copa de Honor Municipalidad de Buenos Aires (2): 1905, 1906

=== International ===
- Copa de Honor Cousenier (1): 1906
- Tie Cup (5): 1903, 1906, 1907, 1908, 1909

== Bibliography ==
- Alumni, Cuna de Campeones y Escuela de Hidalguía by Ernesto Escobar Bavio, Editorial Difusión of Buenos Aires (1953)
