= Carlos Lett =

Argentine footballer

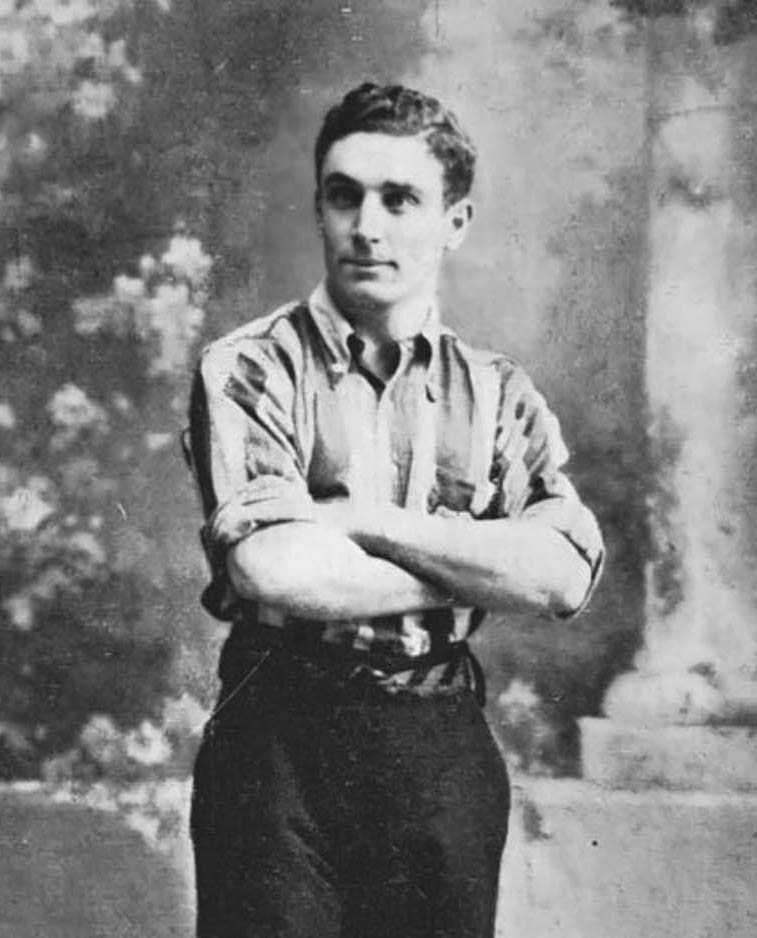
- Lett with Alumni in 1906

Personal information
- Full name: Carlos Arturo Lett
- Date of birth: November 4, 1885
- Place of birth: Argentina
- Date of death: March 8, 1956 (aged 70)
- Place of death: Granby, Quebec, Canada
- Position: Forward

Senior career*
Years	Team	Apps	(Gls)
1905–11	Alumni		

International career
1905–11	Argentina		
- * Club domestic league appearances and goals

Carlos Arturo Lett (November 4, 1885 - March 8, 1956) was an Argentine footballer who played as forward. Lett played most of his career in Alumni (where he won 16 titles) and the Argentina national team.

== Biography ==
Lett joined Alumni in 1905 along to goalkeeper José Buruca Laforia. During the year of his debut with the team he became top scorer of the tournament with 15 goals. Alumni also won its 4th championship. In 1906 Alumni won another championship and Lett scored a goal in the final match where Alumni defeated Lomas by 5–0.

Lett played with Alumni until 1911 when the team was disbanded after winning its last title that same year.

With the Argentina national team Lett debuted on 15 August 1905 in a Copa Lipton match against Uruguay. Lett played again for Argentina five years later, in a friendly match against Chile. Lett served with the Royal Field Artillery in World War I including seeing action in the Palestine Campaign in 1917–1918. In October 1918 Lett married Valerie Helen Stears (21 March 1898 - 21 September 1941) and the couple had 7 children and they all lived between Argentina & England over the years. Lett spent his last years with a daughter and her husband near Montreal, Canada. He died on 8 March 1956.

== Titles ==
(All of them won with Alumni):

=== National ===
- Argentine Primera División (6): 1905, 1906, 1907, 1909, 1910, 1911
- Copa de Competencia Jockey Club (3): 1907, 1908, 1909
- Copa de Honor Municipalidad de Buenos Aires (2): 1905, 1906

=== International ===
- Copa de Honor Cousenier (1): 1906
- Tie Cup (4): 1906, 1907, 1908, 1909

=== Individual honours ===
- Argentine Primera División topscorer (1): 1905 (12 goals)
