= José Buruca Laforia =

Argentine footballer (1884–1957)

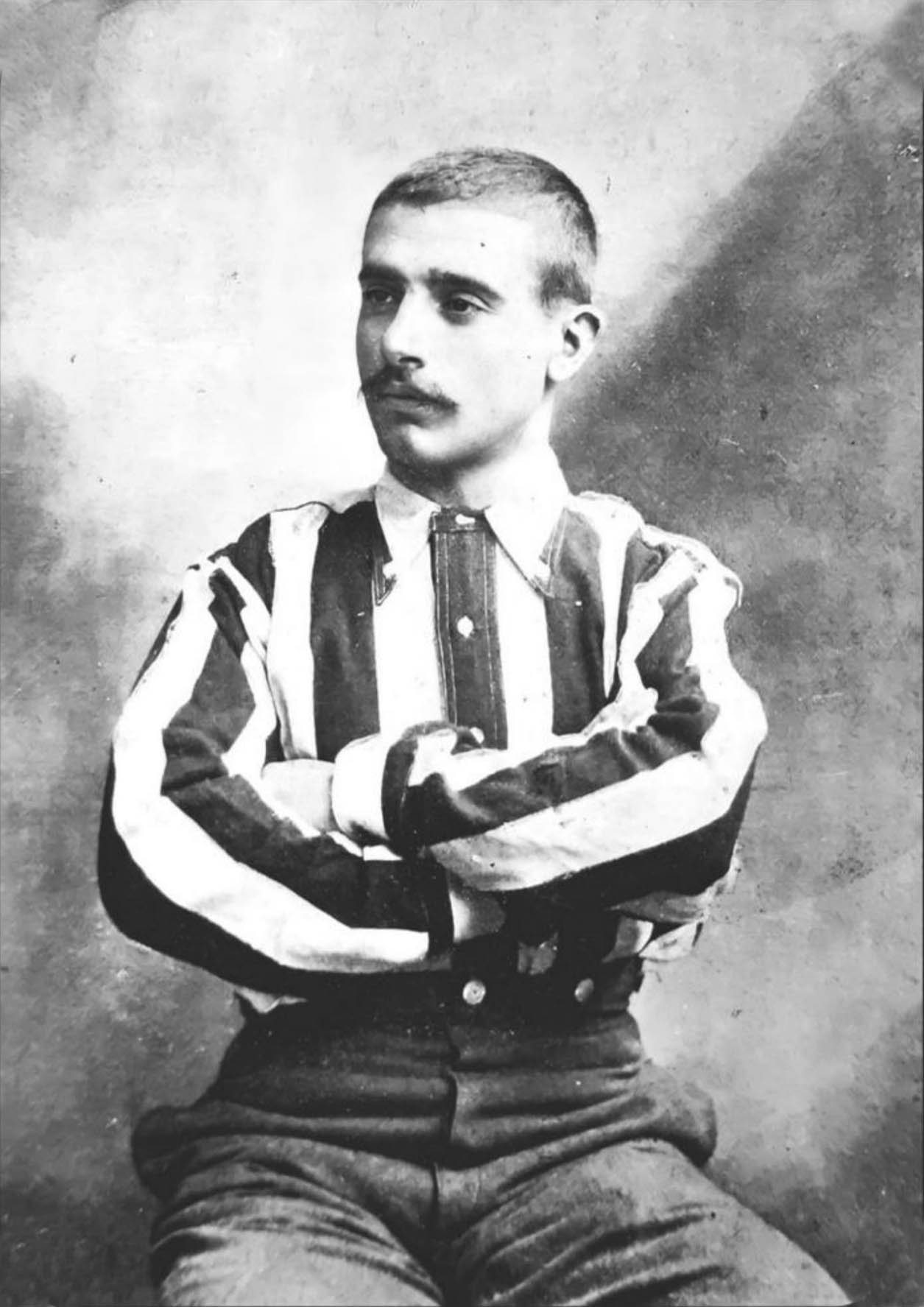
- Laforia in 1906

Personal information
- Full name: José María Buruca Laforia
- Date of birth: 1884
- Place of birth: Atalaya, Spain
- Date of death: 1957 (aged 72–73)
- Place of death: Buenos Aires, Argentina
- Position: Goalkeeper

Senior career*
Years	Team	Apps	(Gls)
1900	Central A.C.		
1901–1904	Barracas A.C.		
1905–1908	Alumni		
1908	Argentino (Q)		
1909–11	Independiente		
19?–12	Racing		

International career
1902–1907	Argentina	4	(0)
- * Club domestic league appearances and goals

José María Buruca Laforia (Atalaya, Spain, 16 May 1884 – Buenos Aires, Argentina, 6 Jun 1957) was an Argentine association football goalkeeper. Nicknamed El Vasco, Buruca Laforia is considered the first great goalkeeper of Argentina.

== Career ==
Although Buruca was short height to play as goalkeeper, his intuition made him to be just in time under the goal. His playing style (usually getting away from the goal area) made Alumni's captain Jorge Brown told him off several times. He is considered a predecessor of other goalkeepers such as Ubaldo Fillol or Hugo Gatti.

Buruca started his career playing for Central Athletic Club, then moving to Barracas A.C. where he stayed until 1904. That same year he was the goalkeeper in the first international match played by an Argentine side v. a British team, Southampton in Buenos Aires. In 1905 he moved to Alumni, along with forward Carlos Lett. Buruca won 3 Primera División championships among other titles.

In 1909 Buruca moved to Independiente where he played until 1911, then playing for Argentino de Quilmes and Racing Club de Avellaneda. After his father died, Buruca decided to quit from football.

...Because of his short stature, it was difficult (to Laforia) to touch the goal crossbar. He was happy when he could do it, saying that it was because of his knees. He was like a rubber or a spring. He stretched beyond the limits and was really fearless. He and Jorge Brown usually bet on who of them could touch the crossbar most times: Jorge, with the tips of his toes and Laforia with his hands. It was a very unequal challenge so Jorge could do it everytime he wanted while the Vasco fought for every attempt: he sometimes touched the goal, and barely...

— Ernesto Escobar Bavio

Buruca was the first goalkeeper to play for the Argentina national team in an official match, playing v. Uruguay in Montevideo on July 20, 1902. Buruca only played four times for Argentina, being his last match on August 15, 1907, vs. Uruguay for the Copa Lipton. He was injured at 60' and replaced by forward Alfredo Brown who had to switch to goalkeeper because substitutions were not allowed by then. His goal remained unbeaten, setting a record.

== Honours ==
Alumni

- Primera División (3): 1905, 1906, 1907
- Copa de Honor Municipalidad de Buenos Aires (2): 1905, 1906
- Copa de Competencia Jockey Club (2): 1907, 1908
- Tie Cup (6): 1906, 1907
- Copa de Honor Cousenier (1): 1906
