= 1923 River Plate Rugby Union Championship =

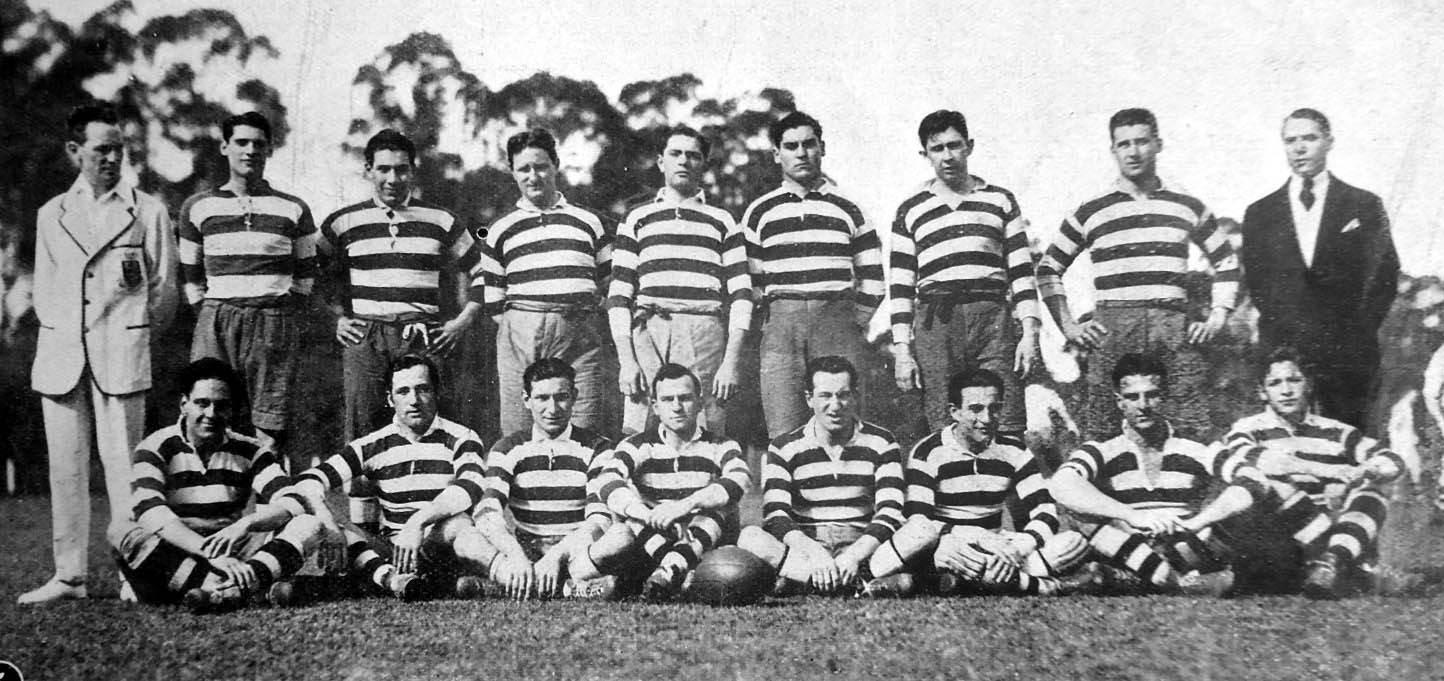
- C.A. San Isidro, champions
- Countries: Argentina
- Number of teams: 5
- Champions: San Isidro (6th. title)
- Runners-up: Universitario
- Matches played: 11

The 1923 River Plate Rugby Union Championship was the 25th. edition of the RPRU championship, a rugby union club competition held in Argentina, organised by the "River Plate Rugby Union" (current Argentine Rugby Union). The growth of rugby in the country was signified by its increasing popularity, number of players, teams, and supporters.

The competition was contested by five teams from the Buenos Aires city and conurbation area, and played in a double round-robin tournament format. San Isidro was the winner with 16 points earned in eight match played., also winning their 6th. consecutive league title.

== Participating clubs ==
Club	Est.	Home venue	Neighborhood	Ref.
Belgrano	1896	Virrey del Pino	Belgrano	
Buenos Aires	1886	BACC Ground	Palermo	
Gimnasia y Esgrima	1880	Estadio GEBA	Palermo	
San Isidro	1902	Estadio del CASI	San Isidro	
Universitario	1918	n/a (Note: According to CUBA's website, the club did not have a field for the practise of the sport. It was not specified where the field was located on.)	n/a	

== Results ==
Note: some results are missed.

Home \ Away	BAC	BAF	GIM	CAS	UNI
Belgrano		–	7–5	3–10	0–10
Buenos Aires	17–8		–	0–4	–
Gimnasia y Esgrima	3–15	–		0–30	–
San Isidro	11–8	16–0	30–0		8–3
Universitario	10–0	5–3	–	0–8	

Legend: Blue = home team win; Yellow = draw; Red = away team win.

== Final table ==
Pos	Team	Pld	W	D	L	GF	GA	GD	Pts	Qualification
1	San Isidro	8	8	0	0	100	12	+88	16	Champion
2	Universitario	8	6	0	2	70	30	+40	12	
3	Belgrano	8	3	0	5	52	72	−20	6	
4	Buenos Aires	8	3	0	5	60	64	−4	6	
5	Gimnasia y Esgrima	8	0	0	8	32	136	−104	0	

== Aftermath ==
The 1923 season consolidated the dominance of San Isidro in domestic rugby, winning their 6th. consecutive title since their first championship in 1917, the same year San Isidro affiliated to RPRU. The team would achieve an impressive (and still unmatched) record of 13 consecutive titles from 1917 to 1930.

That record has been compared with football club Racing's, which won seven consecutive Primera División titles between 1913 and 1919. Both institutions share the privilege of being the only teams with such records in Argentina.

Some notable players for San Isidro in the tournament were Claudio Bincaz. Antonio Bilbao La Vieja
