= Antonio Bilbao La Vieja =

Antonio Bilbao
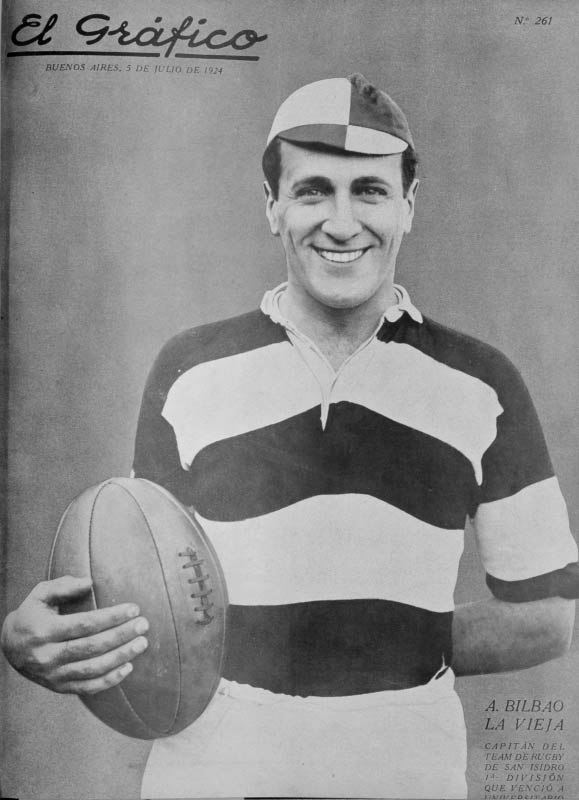
- Bilbao la Vieja covered on El Gráfico, July 1924.
- Born: Antonio Alfredo Bilbao la Vieja y Rosende Mitre; 1892 Buenos Aires, Argentina
- Died: January 6, 1980. Buenos Aires, Argentina

Rugby union career
Amateur team(s)
Years	Team	Apps	(Points)
- San Isidro
Coaching career
- Years: Team
- 1927: Argentina

Antonio Bilbao La Vieja (1892–1980) was an Argentine architect and rugby union footballer. He spent his entire sports career at San Isidro and served in the Argentina national team in 1927.

== Biography ==
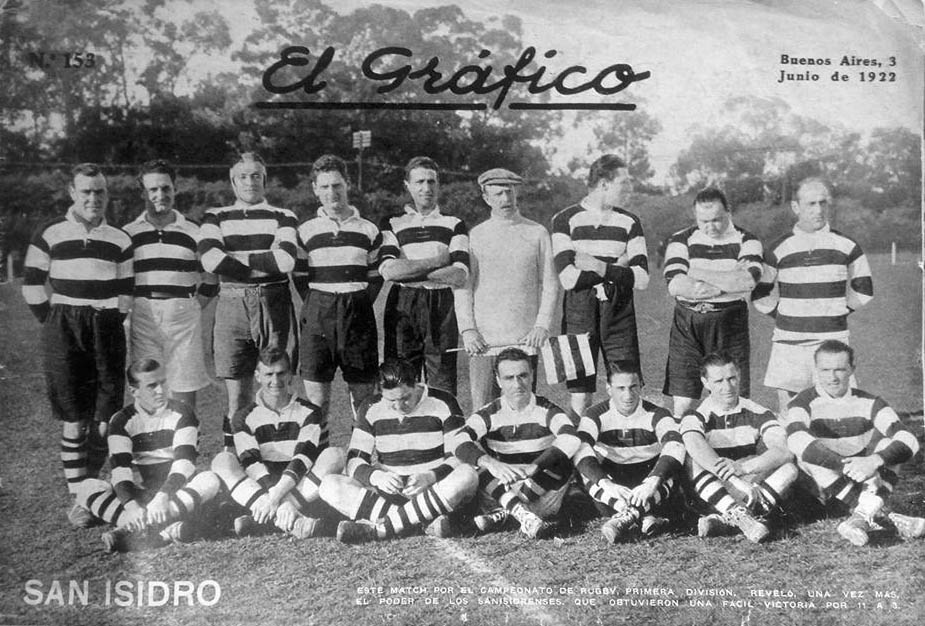
The San Isidro team of 1922.

Antonio Bilbao was born in Buenos Aires, the son of Antonio Gervasio Bilbao and Edelmira Felisa Rosende Mitre, of Creoles origin. His distant ancestors hailed from La Rioja, Spain. He achieved prominence as an Argentine architect, undertaking his first project to construct a significant neighborhood park in La Tablada, Greater Buenos Aires. Bilbao held the position of Assistant Professor of Architecture Theory at the University of Buenos Aires. He was also a member of the Scientific Society Argentina.

== Sport career ==
Bilbao embarked on his sports journey as a player for Estudiantes de La Plata. Subsequently, he joined San Isidro, where he held the roles of captain and coach for the club. Additionally, he assumed the position of head coach for the Argentina national rugby union team.

During the 1950s, Bilbao actively participated as a member of the executive committee of the Argentine Rugby Union.

== Titles ==
All of these victories were achieved with Club Atlético San Isidro:

- Torneo de la URBA (15): 1917, 1918, 1920, 1921, 1922, 1923, 1924, 1925, 1926, 1927, 1928, 1929, 1930, 1933, 1934
