= 1911 in Argentine football =

Football in Argentina
- Season: 1911

Men's football
- Primera División: Alumni
- Intermedia: Estudiantes (LP)
- Segunda División: Riachuelo B
- Tercera División: Racing (Note: Reserve team.)
- Copa de Honor: Newell's Old Boys
- Copa de Competencia: San Isidro

1911 in Argentine football saw Alumni regain the championship for the third time in succession, by beating Porteño in a championship playoff. It was the team's 10th title in 12 seasons and was also its last tournament disputed so the football team was disbanded at the end of the season due to financial problems.

== Primera División ==
The 1911 championship featured nine teams, with each team playing the other twice. Racing Club made its debut.

=== Final standings ===
Pos	Team	Pts	G	W	D	L	Gf	Ga	Gd
1	Alumni	23	16	11	1	4	48	15	+33
2	Porteño	23	16	10	3	3	26	12	+14
3	San Isidro	18	16	7	4	5	29	24	+5
4	Racing Club	17	16	6	5	5	26	24	+2
5	River Plate	16	16	6	4	6	22	31	-9
6	Gimnasia y Esgrima (BA)	14	16	5	4	7	28	31	-3
7	Belgrano AC	13	16	4	5	7	23	28	-5
8	Estudiantes (BA)	12	16	2	8	6	20	36	-16
9	Quilmes	8	16	2	4	10	23	43	-20

=== Championship playoff ===
Alumni and Porteño finished level on points at the top of the table, being necessary the dispute of a playoff match, won by Alumni.

26 November 1911

Alumni	2–1	Porteño
	Report

Gimnasia y Esgrima (BA)

== Lower divisions ==
=== Intermedia ===
- Champion: Estudiantes (LP)

=== Second Division ===
- Champion: Riachuelo B

=== Third Division ===
- Champion: Racing Club

== Domestic cups ==
=== Copa de Honor Municipalidad de Buenos Aires ===
- Champion: Newell's Old Boys

==== Final ====
1911

Newells's	3-2	Porteño
	Report

Palermo

=== Copa Jockey Club ===
- Champion: San Isidro

==== Final ====
1911

San Isidro	4-2	Estudiantes (BA)
	Report

San Isidro

== International cups ==
=== Tie Cup ===
- Champion: (Uruguay) Wanderers

==== Final ====
1 October 1911

Wanderers (Uruguay)	2-0	(Argentina) San Isidro
	Report

San Isidro

=== Copa de Honor Cousenier ===
- Champion: (Uruguay) CURCC

==== Final ====
5 November 1911

CURCC (Uruguay)	2-0	(Argentina) Newells's
	Report

Montevideo

== Argentina national team ==
Argentina won a new edition of the Copa Newton and Copa Premier Honor Argentino but the squad lost the Copa Lipton and the first edition of Copa Premier Honor Uruguayo at the hands of Uruguay.

=== Copa Lipton ===
15 August

Argentina	0-2	Uruguay
	Report

Montevideo

=== Copa Newton ===
17 September

Argentina	3-2	Uruguay
	Report

Montevideo

=== Copa Premier Honor Uruguayo ===
8 October

Argentina	1-1 (aet)	Uruguay

Montevideo

29 October

Argentina	0-3	Uruguay
	Report

Montevideo

=== Copa Premier Honor Argentino ===
22 October 1911

Argentina	2-0	Uruguay
	Report

Buenos Aires
