= 1909 in Argentine football =

Football in Argentina
- Season: 1909

Men's football
- Primera División: Alumni
- Segunda División: Gim. y Esg. (BA)
- Tercera División: Ferro C. Oeste II
- Copa de Honor: San Isidro
- Copa de Competencia: Alumni

1909 in Argentine football saw Alumni win the championship, their 8th title in 10 seasons. Argentina won all three international trophies contested against Uruguay.

== Primera División ==
The 1909 championship featured 10 teams, with each team playing the other twice. River Plate made its debuts at the top division while Lomas AC and Reformer were relegated, being the first teams in the history of Primera División to be relegated under the new system.

=== Final standings ===
| Pos | Team | Pts | G | W | D | L | Gf | Ga | Gd |
|---|---|---|---|---|---|---|---|---|---|
| 1 | Alumni | 32 | 18 | 15 | 2 | 1 | 74 | 19 | +55 |
| 2 | River Plate | 24 | 18 | 11 | 2 | 5 | 35 | 26 | +9 |
| 3 | Quilmes | 20 | 18 | 8 | 4 | 6 | 36 | 39 | -3 |
| 4 | Estudiantes (BA) | 19 | 18 | 8 | 3 | 7 | 40 | 31 | +9 |
| 5 | Belgrano AC | 18 | 18 | 6 | 6 | 6 | 36 | 35 | +1 |
| 6 | San Isidro | 17 | 18 | 7 | 3 | 8 | 33 | 27 | +6 |
| 7 | Porteño | 16 | 18 | 7 | 2 | 9 | 35 | 39 | -4 |
| 8 | Argentino de Quilmes | 14 | 18 | 5 | 4 | 9 | 19 | 40 | -21 |
| 9 | Reformer | 12 | 18 | 3 | 6 | 9 | 21 | 42 | -21 |
| 10 | Lomas AC | 8 | 18 | 1 | 6 | 11 | 17 | 48 | -31 |

== Lower divisions ==
=== Primera B ===
- Champion: Gimnasia y Esgrima (BA)

=== Primera C ===
- Champion: Ferro Carril Oeste II

== Domestic cups ==
=== Copa de Honor Municipalidad de Buenos Aires ===
- Champion: San Isidro

==== Final ====
3 October 1909

| San Isidro | 8-1 | Estudiantes (BA) |
|---|---|---|
| | Report |

San Isidro

=== Copa Jockey Club ===
- Champion: Alumni

==== Final ====
22 August 1909

| Alumni | 5-1 | Newell's |
|---|---|---|
| | Report |

Banco Nación

(*) During this edition Estudiantes (BA) set a record that persists nowadays, beating Lomas AC by 18-0. Moreover, Maximiliano Susan scored 12 goals, 7 of them within 20 minutes.

== International cups ==
=== Tie Cup ===
- Champion: (Argentina) Alumni

==== Final ====
5 September 1909

| Alumni (Argentina) | 4-0 | (Uruguay) CURCC |
|---|---|---|
| | Report |

Palermo

=== Copa de Honor Cousenier ===
- Champion: (Uruguay) CURCC

==== Final ====
17 October 1909

| CURCC (Uruguay) | 4-2 | (Argentina) San Isidro |
|---|---|---|
| | Report |

Montevideo

== Argentina national team ==
Argentina retained both Copa Lipton and Copa Newton in 1909 and won the Copa Premier Honor Argentino for the first time.

=== Copa Lipton ===
15 August 1909

| Argentina | 2-1 | Uruguay |
|---|---|---|
| | Report |

Buenos Aires

=== Copa Newton ===
9 September 1909

| Argentina | 2-2 | Uruguay |
|---|---|---|
| | Report |

Montevideo

=== Copa Premier Honor Argentino ===
10 October 1909

| Argentina | 3-1 | Uruguay |
|---|---|---|
| | Report |

Buenos Aires

=== Friendly matches ===
| Date | Venue/City | Rival | Score | Report |
|---|---|---|---|---|
| 13 June 1909 | Buenos Aires | Tottenham Hotspur | 0-1 | |
