= Jorge Stewart =

Argentine rugby union player

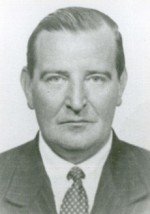
- Born: c.1900 Buenos Aires, Argentina
- Died: Buenos Aires, Argentina

Rugby union career
- Position: Lock
Youth career
- -: Club Atlético San Isidro
Amateur team(s)
Years	Team	Apps	(Points)
- San Isidro Club
International career
Years	Team	Apps	(Points)
1932	Argentina		

Jorge Stewart was an Argentine rugby union footballer, president of San Isidro Club. and vice president of the Argentine Rugby Union.

== Career ==
Stewart was born in Buenos Aires around 1900. In the 1920s, he began his career in the Club Atlético San Isidro. In 1935 was sanctioned together with other San Isidro players, by the executive committee of the CASI. That same year he participated in the founding of the SIC. Stewart was the captain of the team in 1936.

On May 3, 1936, the San Isidro Club played its first match against Olivos Rugby Club, with a score 7–6 in favor of Olivos. He also played for the national team, his first test match was against South Africa, on July 16, 1932.

Jorge Stewart was president of the San Isidro Club, between April 26, 1950, and May 10, 1954.

== Titles ==
C.A. San Isidro

- Torneo de la URBA (5): 1929, 1930, 1933, 1934, 1939
