= 1910 in Argentine football =

Football in Argentina
- Season: 1910

Men's football
- Primera División: Alumni
- Segunda División: Racing
- Tercera División: Instituto Americano
- Copa de Competencia: Estudiantes (BA)

1910 in Argentine football saw Alumni regain the championship, winning its 9th title in 11 seasons.

== Primera División ==
The 1909 championship was reduced from 10 to 9 teams, with each team playing the other twice.

Gimnasia y Esgrima de Buenos Aires (promoted last year) made its debut at the top division while Argentino de Quilmes was relegated to Segunda División.

=== Final standings ===
Pos	Team	Pts	G	W	D	L	Gf	Ga	Gd
1	Alumni	25	16	10	5	1	42	13	+29
2	Porteño	21	16	8	5	3	33	25	+8
3	Belgrano AC	19	16	8	3	5	42	24	+18
4	Estudiantes (BA)	19	16	8	3	5	33	29	+4
5	San Isidro	18	16	6	6	4	30	27	+3
6	Gimnasia y Esgrima (BA)	15	16	5	5	6	29	25	+4
7	River Plate	12	16	4	4	8	27	37	-10
8	Quilmes	8	16	2	4	10	24	52	-28
9	Argentino de Quilmes	7	16	2	3	11	21	49	-28

== Lower divisions ==
=== Primera B ===
- Champion: Estudiantes (BA)

=== Primera C ===
- Champion: Instituto Americano (Adrogué)

== Domestic cups ==
=== Copa de Competencia Jockey Club ===
- Champion: Estudiantes (BA)

==== Final ====
Estudiantes (BA)	3-1	Gimnasia y Esgrima (BA)
	Report

Palermo

== International cups ==
=== Tie Cup ===
- Champion: none

==== Final ====
8 August 1910

Estudiantes (BA) (Argentina)	2-2	(Uruguay) CURCC
	Report

Buenos Aires

== Argentina national team ==
Argentina won the first tournament of the year, the South America Cup. The squad would then lose the Copa Lipton and Copa Premier Honor Argentino finals at the hands of Uruguay.

=== South America Cup ===
27 May 1910

Argentina	3-1	Chile

Buenos Aires

12 Jun 1910

Argentina	4-1	Uruguay
	Report

Buenos Aires

=== Copa Lipton ===
15 August 1910

Argentina	1-3	Uruguay
	Report

Montevideo

=== Copa Premier Honor Argentino ===
13 November 1910

Argentina	1-1	Uruguay

Buenos Aires

27 November 1910

Argentina	2-6	Uruguay
	Report

Buenos Aires

=== Friendly matches ===
Date	Venue/City	Rival	Score	Report
5 June 1910	Buenos Aires	Chile	5-1	
11 September 1910	Viña del Mar	Chile	3-0	
9 October 1910	Montevideo	(Uruguay) Wanderers	1-2	
