= Claudio Bincaz =

Argentine sportsman

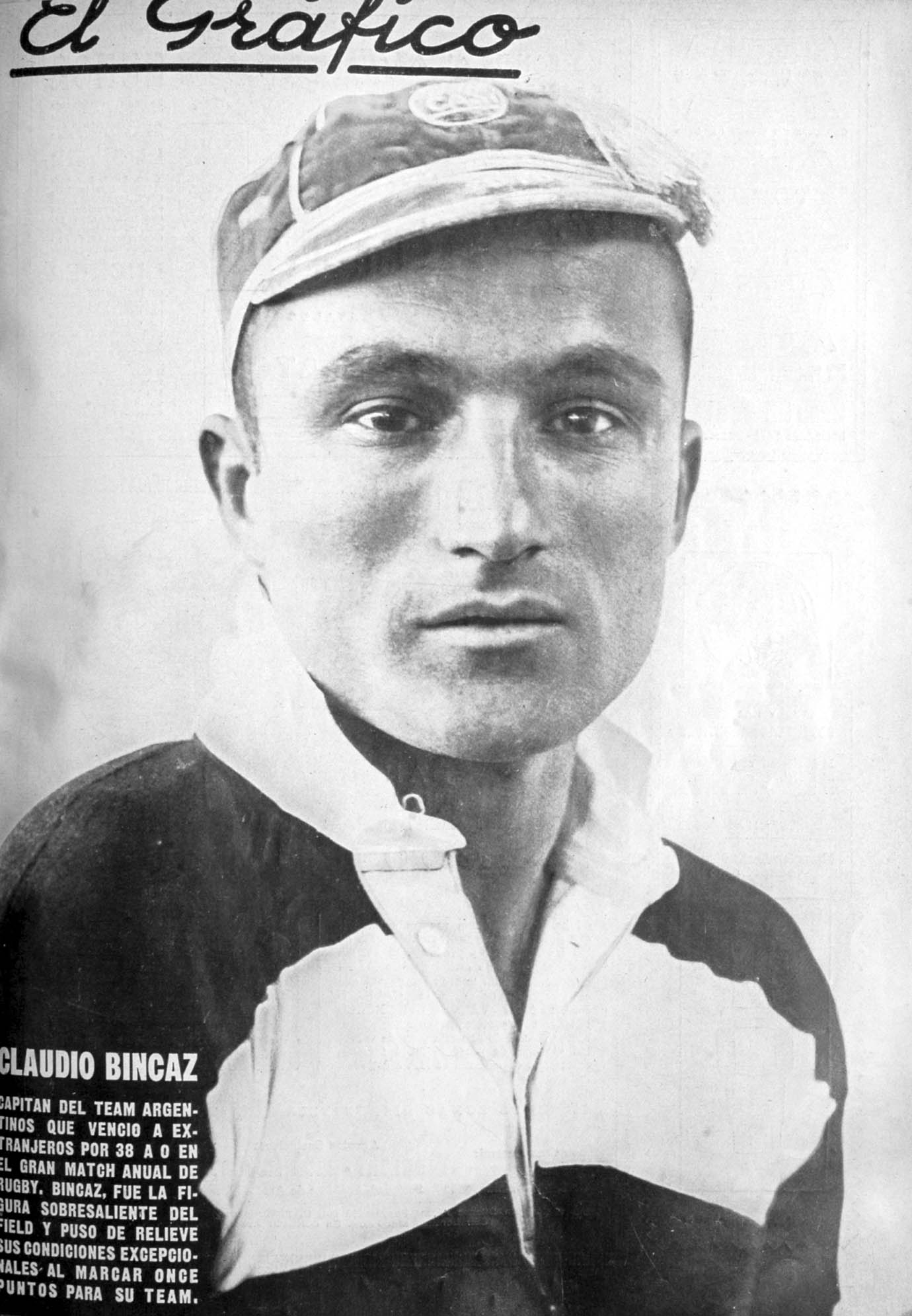
- Bincaz in 1927 with the San Isidro rugby union team

Personal information
- Born: May 10, 1897 San Isidro, Argentina
- Died: November 8, 1980 (aged 83)

Sport
- Sport: Association football; Rugby union; Sailing
Medal record
Men's football
Representing Argentina
South American Championship
| Runner-up | 1916 Argentina |

Claudio Bincaz (10 May 1897 – 8 November 1980) was an Argentine sportsman who competed in sailing, association football and rugby union for the Club Atlético San Isidro during the 1920s.

On 10 July 1916, Bincaz played for the Argentina national football team at the 1916 South American Championship. He was on the grandstand before being called for the team to replace Alberto Ohaco, who had not attended the match because of his duties. As a result, Bincaz played as a left winger against Brazil.

In rugby, Bincaz was part of the CA San Isidro squad that achieved a record of 13 consecutive championships won between 1917 and 1930.

During his career, he also represented the Argentine national rugby union team.

The Argentina rugby team was close to participating in the 1924 Summer Olympics. The Argentine Rugby Union decided that the roster would be elected by popular vote. Bincaz was the second most-voted player, but the team could not travel to Paris due to financial problems.
