= 1906 in Argentine football =

Football in Argentina
- Season: 1906

Men's football
- Primera División: Alumni
- Segunda División: Estudiantes (BA) II
- Tercera División: Gimnasia y Esgrima (BA)
- Copa de Honor: Alumni

1906 in Argentine football saw Alumni regaining the Argentine championship for the 6th time in seven seasons. The team also won the local Copa de Honor Municipalidad de Buenos Aires and internationals Tie Cup and Copa de Honor Cousenier, obtaining four titles within the same year.

San Isidro, Argentino de Quilmes and San Martín made their debuts in Primera.

== Primera División ==
The 1906 championship was expanded to include 11 teams. The teams were split into two groups with each team playing the others in their group twice. The two group winners played in a championship decider.

=== Group A ===
Pos	Team	Pts	G	W	D	L	Gf	Ga	Gd
1	Lomas AC	15	10	7	1	2	23	14	+9
2	San Martín AC (San Martín)	12	10	5	2	3	17	9	+8
3	Estudiantes (BA)	12	10	6	0	4	22	19	+3
4	San Isidro	10	10	5	0	5	23	22	+1
5	Reformer	8	10	4	0	6	30	22	+8
6	Barracas AC	1	10	1	1	8	8	37	-29

=== Group B ===
Pos	Team	Pts	G	W	D	L	Gf	Ga	Gd
1	Alumni	14	8	7	0	1	28	6	+22
2	Quilmes	12	8	6	0	2	26	13	+13
3	Belgrano AC	10	8	5	0	3	23	15	+8
4	Argentino de Quilmes	2	8	1	0	7	5	19	-14
5	Belgrano AC "B"	2	8	1	0	7	9	38	-29

=== Championship final ===
7 October 1906

Alumni	4–0	Lomas AC

Palermo

== Lower divisions ==
=== Primera B ===
- Champion: Estudiantes (BA) II

=== Primera C ===
- Champion: Gimnasia y Esgrima (BA)

== Domestic cup ==
=== Copa de Honor Municipalidad de Buenos Aires ===
Champion: Alumni

==== Final ====
9 September 1906

Alumni	3–1	Estudiantes (BA)

Belgrano

== International cups ==
=== Tie Cup ===
- Champion: (Argentina) Alumni

==== Final ====
30 August 1906

Alumni (Argentina)	10–1	(Argentina) Belgrano AC
Eliseo Brown (5); Alfredo Brown (4); Ernesto Brown	Report	C. H. Wahley

Quilmes

=== Copa de Honor Cousenier ===
- Champions: (Argentina) Alumni

==== Finals ====
16 September 1906

Alumni (Argentina)	2–2	(Uruguay) Nacional

Montevideo
14 October 1906

Alumni (Argentina)	3–1	(Uruguay) Nacional
	Report

Montevideo

== Argentina national team ==
Argentina national team won their first trophies, on 15 August 1906 they won 3–2 against Uruguay in Montevideo to win the 2nd edition of Copa Lipton, in October they defeated Uruguay again to win the inaugural Copa Newton.

=== Copa Lipton ===
==== Final ====
15 August 1906

Argentina	2–0	Uruguay
Brown 28'; Tristan Gozalez 85'	Report

Montevideo

=== Copa Newton ===
==== Final ====
21 October 1906

Argentina	2–1	Uruguay
Hutton 26'; Brown 80'	Report	Gilberto Peralta 87'

Buenos Aires

=== Friendly matches ===
Date	Venue/City	Rival	Score	Report
9 July 1906	Buenos Aires	South Africa Combined	0-1	
