= Juan Behrensen =

Argentine swimmer

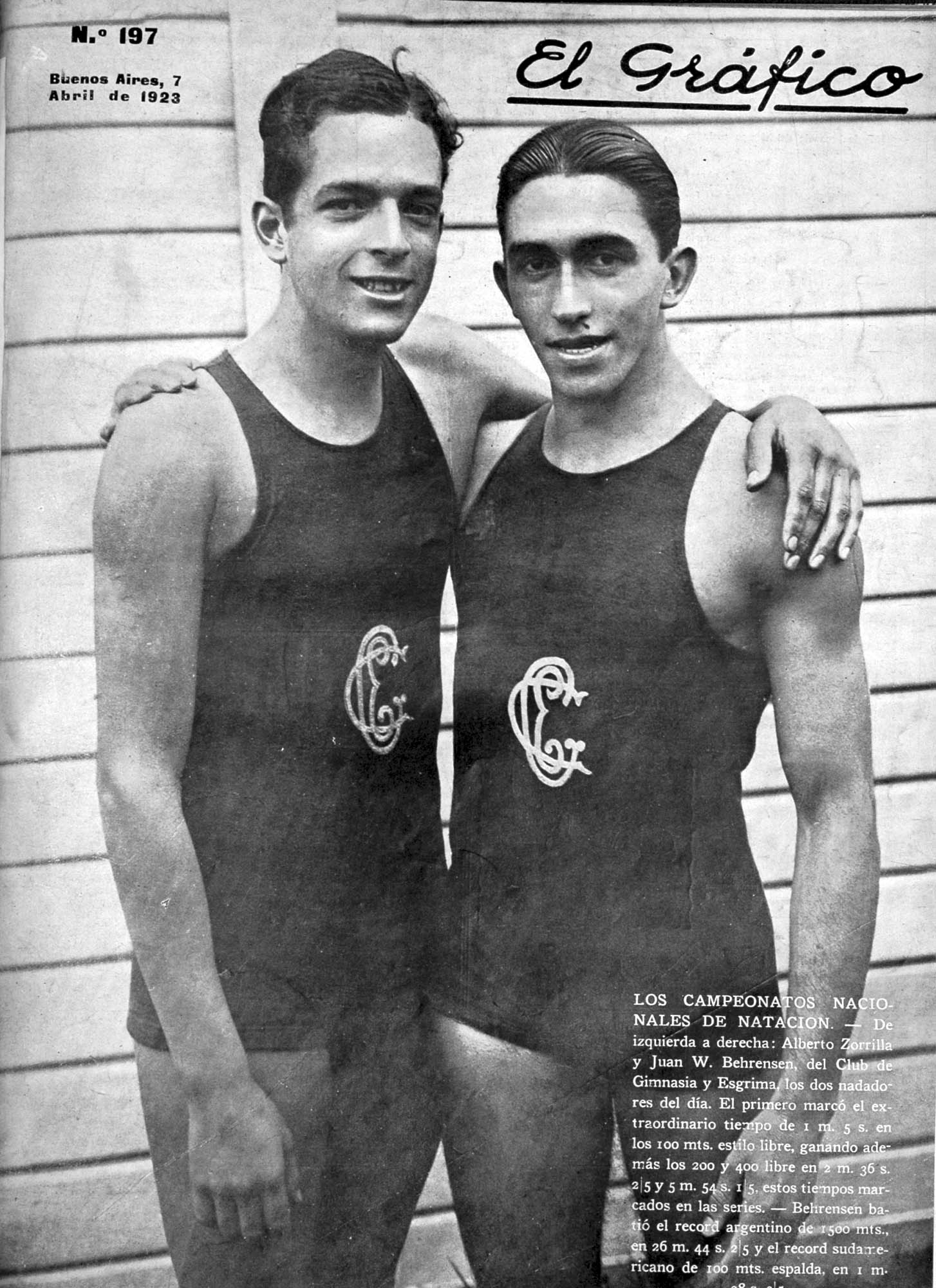
- Behrensen (r) and Alberto Zorrilla (El Gráfico)

Personal information
- Born: 27 April 1904 Santa Fe, Argentina
- Died: 13 August 1981 (aged 77)

Sport
- Sport: Swimming

Juan Behrensen (27 April 1904 – 13 August 1981) was an Argentine swimmer. He competed in the men's 4 × 200 metre freestyle relay event at the 1924 Summer Olympics.
