= Atalaya, Badajoz =

Atalaya
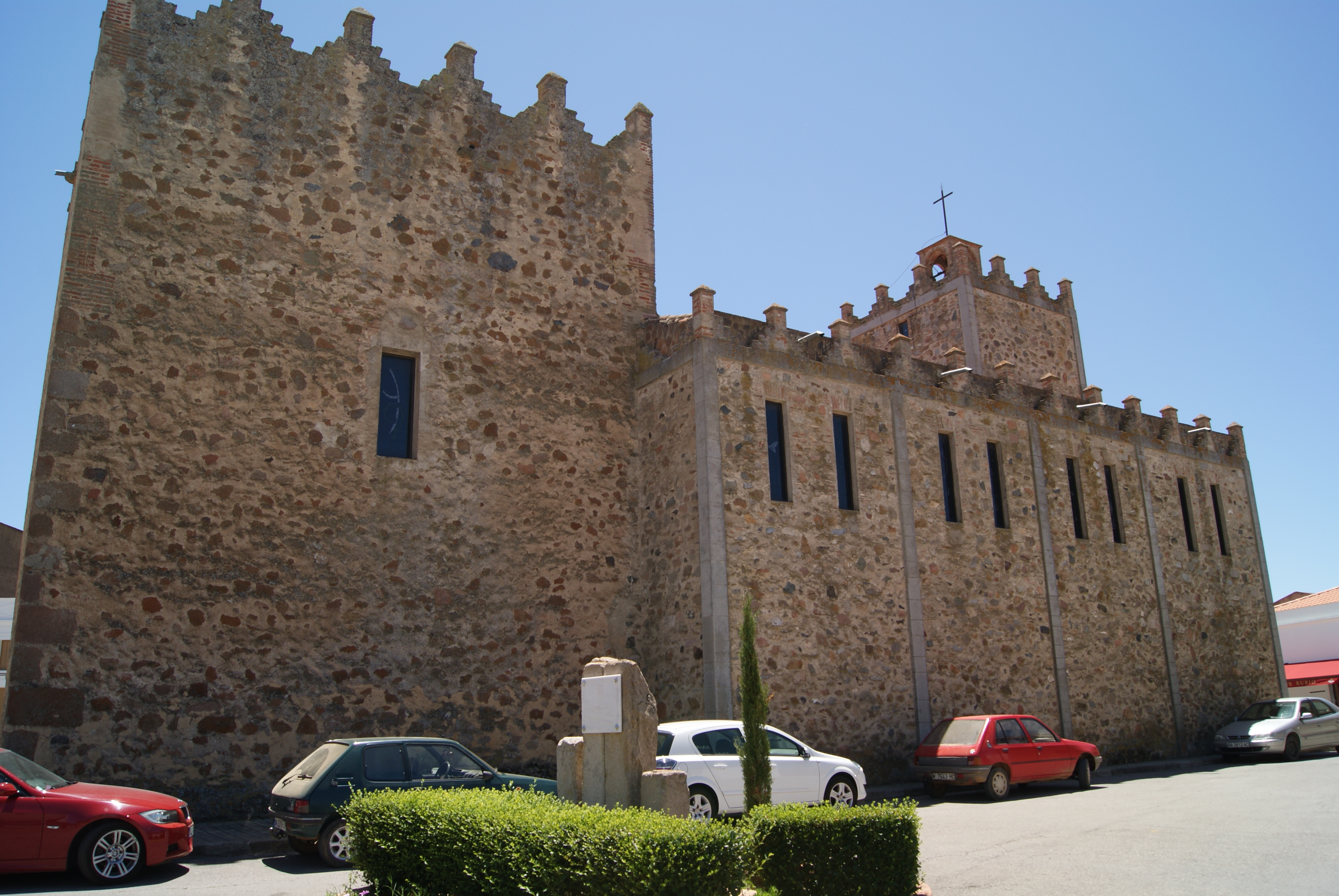

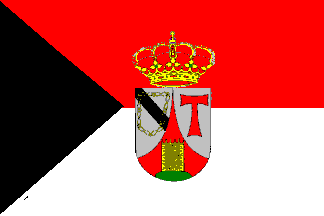
- Flag

- Location of Atalaya within Extremadura
- Coordinates: 38°19′59″N 6°28′29″W
- Country: Spain
- Autonomous community: Extremadura
- Province: Badajoz
- Comarca: Zafra - Río Bodión

Government
  - Alcalde: José Luis Berrocal Moreno

Area
  - Total: 22.7 km^{2} (8.8 sq mi)

Population (2025-01-01)
  - Total: 258
- Time zone: UTC+1 (CET)
  - Summer (DST): UTC+2 (CEST)

Atalaya is a Spanish municipality in the province of Badajoz, Extremadura. It has a population of 339 (2007) and an area of 22.7 km^{2} (8.8 sq mi).

== See also ==
- List of municipalities in Badajoz
