= 1907 in Argentine football =

Football in Argentina
- Season: 1907

Men's football
- Primera División: Alumni
- Segunda División: Nacional (Floresta)
- Tercera División: Atlanta
- Copa de Honor: Belgrano A.C.
- Copa de Competencia: Alumni

1907 in Argentine football saw Alumni regain the Argentine championship winning its 7th Primera División (First Division) title in eight seasons.

The relegation system was established from this season. Barracas AC withdrew after 7 fixtures and was disaffiliated by the Association.

== Primera División ==
The 1907 championship featured eleven teams, with each team playing the other twice.

=== Final standings ===
Pos	Team	Pts	G	W	D	L	Gf	Ga	Gd
1	Alumni	37	20	17	3	0	76	13	+63
2	Estudiantes (BA)	31	20	13	5	2	51	25	+26
3	San Isidro	25	20	11	3	6	51	31	+20
4	Quilmes	24	20	11	2	7	44	31	+13
5	Belgrano AC	23	20	10	3	7	26	26	+0
6	Porteño	22	20	8	6	6	42	41	+1
7	Reformer	17	20	8	1	11	36	53	-17
8	Argentino de Quilmes	16	20	6	4	10	23	50	-27
9	Lomas AC	11	20	4	3	13	21	50	-29
10	San Martín AC (San Martín)	10	20	4	2	14	24	70	-46
11	Barracas AC	4	20	2	0	18	17	21	-4

== Lower divisions ==
=== Primera B ===
- Champion: Nacional (Floresta)

=== Primera C ===
- Champion: Atlanta

== Domestic cups ==
=== Copa de Honor Municipalidad de Buenos Aires ===
- Champion: Belgrano AC

==== Final ====
15 September 1907

Belgrano AC	3-1	Quilmes
C. H. Parr o/g C. H. Whaley; G. G. Stocks	Report	H. C. Pearson

Quilmes

=== Copa de Competencia Jockey Club ===
- Champion: Alumni

==== Final ====
8 September 1907

Alumni	4-2	Belgrano AC
	Report

Belgrano AC

== International cups ==
=== Tie Cup ===
- Champion: (Argentina) Alumni

==== Final ====
29 September 1907

Alumni (Argentina)	3-1	(Uruguay) CURCC
Alfredo Brown (2); Eliseo Brown	Report	A. Manito

Caballito

=== Copa de Honor Cousenier ===
- Champion: (Argentina) Belgrano AC

==== Final ====
20 October 1907

Belgrano AC (Argentina)	2-1	(Uruguay) CURCC
G. Stocks; Kihlberg	Report	Mañana

Parque Central
(Montevideo)

== Argentina national team ==
Argentina retained both Copa Lipton and Copa Newton in 1907.

=== Copa Lipton ===
==== Final ====
15 August 1907

Argentina	2-1	Uruguay
	Report

Buenos Aires

=== Copa Newton ===
==== Final ====
6 October 1907

Argentina	2-1	Uruguay
	Report

Montevideo
