= 1905 in Argentine football =

Football in Argentina
- Season: 1905

Men's football
- Primera División: Alumni
- Segunda División: América
- Tercera División: Alumni III (Note: It was a common practise that clubs playing in Primera División registered reserve teams to play the lower divisions tournaments.)
- Copa de Honor: Alumni

The year 1905 in Argentine football saw Alumni crowning Argentine champion, winning its 5th league title in six seasons. A new team, Reformer Athletic Club from the city of Campana, registered to play the tournament.

== Primera División ==
The 1905 championship was expanded to include 7 teams, who played in a league format, with each team playing the other twice.

=== Final standings ===
| Pos | Team | Pts | G | W | D | L | Gf | Ga | Gd |
|---|---|---|---|---|---|---|---|---|---|
| 1 | Alumni | 21 | 12 | 10 | 1 | 1 | 43 | 8 | +35 |
| 2 | Belgrano AC | 18 | 12 | 9 | 0 | 3 | 31 | 12 | +19 |
| 3 | Estudiantes (BA) | 17 | 12 | 8 | 1 | 3 | 36 | 18 | +18 |
| 4 | Quilmes | 12 | 12 | 6 | 0 | 6 | 32 | 15 | +17 |
| 5 | Reformer | 7 | 12 | 3 | 1 | 8 | 20 | 60 | -40 |
| 6 | Lomas AC | 7 | 12 | 3 | 1 | 8 | 12 | 41 | -29 |
| 7 | Barracas Athletic | 2 | 12 | 1 | 0 | 11 | 8 | 28 | -20 |

== Lower divisions ==
=== Primera B ===
- Champion: América

=== Primera C ===
- Champion: Alumni III

== Domestic cup ==
=== Copa de Honor Municipalidad de Buenos Aires ===
- Champion: Alumni

==== Final ====
30 August 1905

| Alumni | 1-0 (aet) | Quilmes |

Sociedad Sportiva Argentina (Buenos Aires)

== International cups ==
=== Tie Cup ===
- Champion: (Argentina) Rosario AC

==== Final ====
3 September 1905

| Rosario AC (Argentina) | 4-3 (aet) | (Uruguay) CURCC |
|---|---|---|
| M.O. Wells (2); J. G. Parr; W. Stocks | | A. Camacho; C. Camacho; Zibecchi |

Sociedad Sportiva Argentina
(Buenos Aires)

=== Copa de Honor Cusenier ===
- Champion: (Uruguay) Nacional

==== Final ====
10 September 1905

| Nacional (Uruguay) | 3-2 | (Argentina) Alumni |

Montevideo

== Argentina national team ==
Argentina contested its first official tournament in 1905. The squad played Uruguay for Copa Lipton on 15 August 1905. The game ended 0-0 after extra time and the trophy was awarded to Uruguay as the visiting team.

=== Copa Lipton ===
==== Final ====
15 August 1905

| Argentina | 0-0 (aet) | Uruguay |
|---|---|---|
| | Report |

Buenos Aires

== International friendlies ==
English team Nottingham Forest toured on Argentina that year, playing several friendly matches v. clubs and combined teams in Buenos Aires and Rosario.

| Date | Venue/City | Rival | Score |
|---|---|---|---|
| 16-Jun | Rosario | R. Central / Rosario A.C. Combined | 5–0 |
| 18-Jun | Buenos Aires | Belgrano A.C. | 7−0 |
| 22-Jun | Buenos Aires | Británicos (Note: Team formed by British players that played in the Argentine league during the first years of the 20th Century.) | 13−1 |
| ? | Buenos Aires | R. Central / Rosario A.C. Combined | 6−0 |
| ? | Buenos Aires | Alumni | 6−0 |
| 29-Jun | Buenos Aires | Argentinos (Note: Team formed by Argentinean players from the Argentine league during the first years of the 20th Century.) | 5−0 |
| 2-Jul | Buenos Aires | Liga Argentina (Note: All-star team of the Argentine league.) | 9−1 |
