= Gimnasia y Esgrima de Buenos Aires =

Argentine multi-sports club

Gimnasia y Esgrima de Buenos Aires (GEBA)
- Full name: Club de Gimnasia y Esgrima de Buenos Aires
- Founded: 11 November 1880; 146 years ago
- Ground: Estadio GEBA
- Location: Buenos Aires
- League(s): Metropolitano (Hockey); Torneo de la URBA (Rugby)
- Affiliations: AHBA (Hockey); URBA (Rugby)
- President: Víctor Lamberti
- Colors
- Website: geba.host

Club de Gimnasia y Esgrima (also known for its acronym GEBA) is an Argentine amateur sports club headquartered in the city of Buenos Aires. The institution is one of the oldest in the country, having been established in 1880. Gimnasia y Esgrima is also one of the largest clubs of Argentina, with around 30 different disciplines hosted in the three buildings that the institution owns in Buenos Aires.

== History ==
The institution was founded as "Club Cosmopolita de Gimnasia y Esgrima" on 11 November 1880, by fencing and gymnastics enthusiasts in the "Confitería del Aguila", a traditional coffee house of Buenos Aires. Léon Marchand was designed as the first president of the club. In the beginning, the club only hosted indoor sports in a small building on Avenida Rivadavia in Buenos Aires. In 1883, the club moved to a bigger building on Avenida Cangallo, which still remains as club's headquarters. Fencing, gymnastics, and boxing were the sports practised by then. As the club executives wanted to expand its range of sports, GyE got a landin front of Hipódromo Argentino in Palermo, which was named "Sede Maldonado" due to the Maldonado Stream ran below the facility. In Maldonado, the club members found a place where to practise outdoor sports such as football, rugby union, field hockey, and athletics.

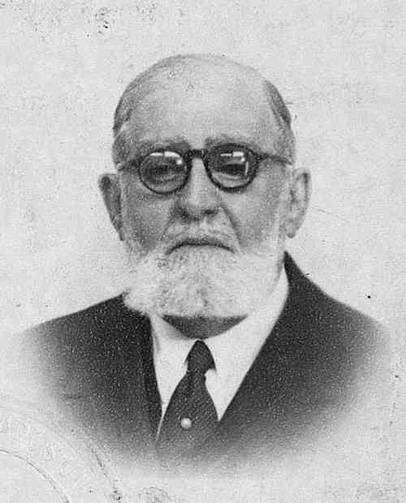
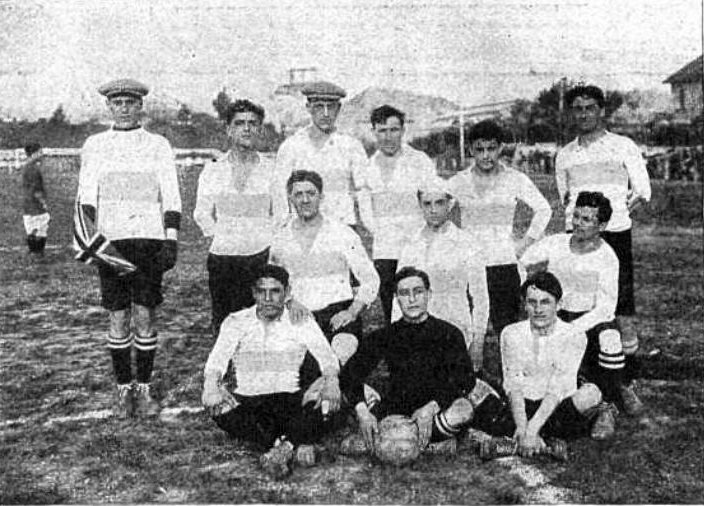
(left): Ricardo Aldao, who presided the club from 1909 to 1947; (right): A football team of GEBA in 1912

Three years later, in 1883, the club changed its name to "Club de Gimnasia y Esgrima". In 1909 Ricardo Camilo Aldao became president of the institution.

The football team took part in the Primera División championships since 1909, when the squad won the second division title, therefore promoting to the top division. In 1910, they managed to reach the final of the Copa Jockey Club, where they lost 3-1 to their classic rival, Estudiantes. (Note: https://rsssf.org/tablesa/arg-joc10.html) Gimnasia played in Primera from 1910 to 1917 when the team was relegated to the División Intermedia (second division) after finishing 20th of 21 teams. The club disaffiliated from the Association soon later, although football has remained as one of the sports practised up to present days.

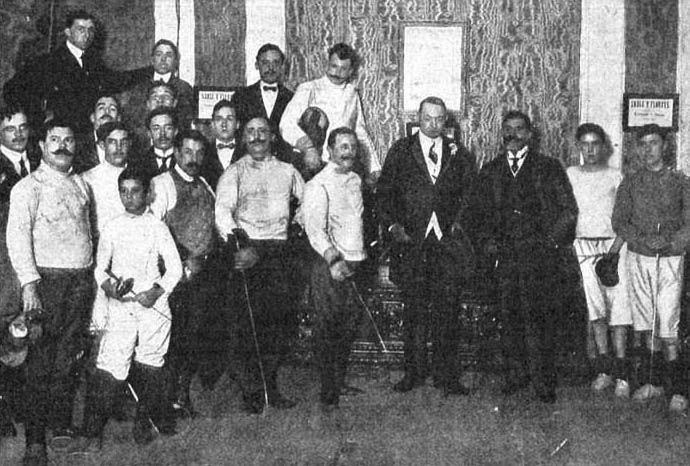
Fencers of the club in 1912

In 1912, Gimnasia y Esgrima was part of the first break up in Argentine football, due to a conflict caused by the position of the club about the sales of tickets for football matches. Gimnasia stated that its members should not pay for tickets because of their membership, which allowed them to take part in all the activities, including free access to the stadium. The club also claimed a higher percentage of the income for tickets sold. The conflict persisted until Gimnasia decided to disaffiliate from the Association on July 14, 1912, establishing a new league, the "Federación Argentina de Football", presided by Ricardo Aldao himself.

Other clubs followed Gimnasia y Esgrima joining the new league, such as Porteño, Estudiantes de La Plata, Independiente, and other teams from the second division. The new league organized its own championships from 1912 to 1915, when both leagues merged into the "Asociación Argentina de Football", putting an end to the conflict.

The club's stadium (which has a capacity of 18,000 spectators) was the field where the Argentina national team played its home games since 1910, making its debut during the Copa Centenario Revolución de Mayo held there. In the final match of that tournament, played against Uruguay, a riot occurred after the suspension of the match was announced, and part of the grandstands –made of wood– were destroyed by fire. After the stadium was rebuilt, many football games held there, even when Gimnasia had disaffiliated from the Association.

In 1920 Gimnasia y Esgrima disaffiliated from all the football associations of Argentina to organize its own championships. By 1928 GyE had more than 120 members with 8 teams formed. Ten years later there were more than 400 members registered to play football. Because of the growth of the activity, the club built one field more.

After leaving the official football leagues in the decade of 1920, rugby union was one of the predominant sports of Gimnasia y Esgrima, winning the Torneo de la URBA titles of 1911 and 1912. The club won two more titles in 1932 and 1939, its last championship to date. Gimnasia y Esgrima currently plays in the Grupo II, the second division of the Unión de Rugby de Buenos Aires league system.

The "Jorge Newbery" seat was built after the Buenos Aires Deliberative Council granted the club a land on Parque 3 de Febrero. In those times, a gym was built at the headquarters on Av. Cangallo. It had a fencing venue where the Villamil family (considered the pionners of GEBA's fencing) started their career. Antonio Villamil was the most notable fencer, having represented Argentina at three Summer Olympics (1928, 1936, and 1948).

The club started to build a new facility, "Sede San Martín", in 1924. The building was designed by architect Juan Abel Waldorp (1885–?) The original project included a stadium for 100,000 spectators but it could not carry out due to lack of funds. The facility was inaugurated in December 1930, being the largest and most important sports complex in South America. It had a great hall featuring a black and white mosaic floor, petiribí wood ornamentation, and wrought-iron chandeliers, all adorned with portraits of the nation's heroes. Its Slavonian oak floor, its columns reminiscent of the Palace of Versailles, and its large windows with still-intact wooden details. The building (popularly known as Castillo de GEBA) was declared "National Historic Monument" in 2014.

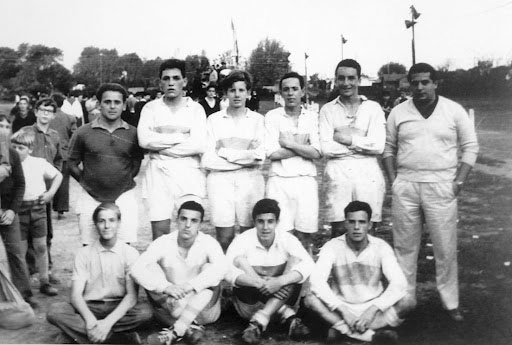
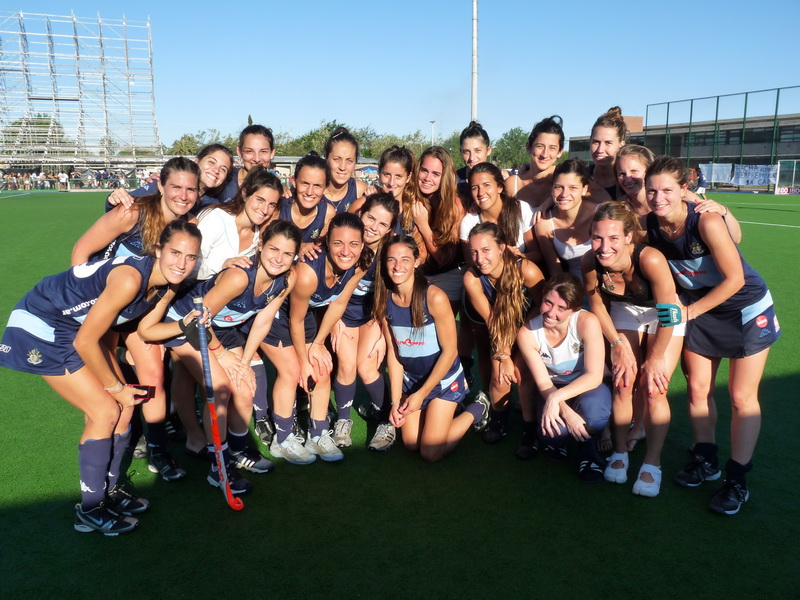
(left): The rugby union team in 1964; (right): The women's field hockey team, 2010 champions

In 1942 president Aldao moved to the club's distinguished guest apartment, establishing it as its permanent home. The only condition required by Aldao to live there was the payment of a monthly rent which would be 6% of the investments made by the club when the apartment was built. In 1947 and after 40 years as president of the institution, Aldao resigned due he was afraid of a possible intervention of the Argentine military government in the club.

Gimnasia has gained a good reputation in women's field hockey due to its successful campaigns during the decade of the 2000, having won 7 Torneo Metropolitano titles, six of them consecutively being the last in 2012.

In September 2014, the rugby union senior squad returned to the first division (Grupo I) after defeating Manuel Belgrano by 23–16 at playoffs (Zona Reubicación). The team had been relegated in 2007.

== Colors and badge ==
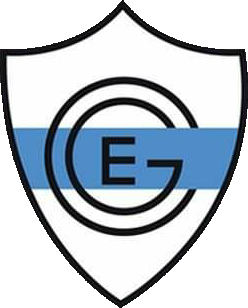
Early logo of GEBA

Gimnasia y Esgrima's teams have also worn a white jersey with a horizontal light blue band. The most used alternate jersey has been the dark blue model, leaving the horizontal band the same as the original.

The badge is composed of a shield with a monogram with the club's initials (CGE), pierced horizontally by a sabre. At background, the other two weapons used in fencing (foil and épée) cross the shield. Above it, a silver combat helmet, and the legend (in Latin) "mens sana in corpore sano" at bottom. A laurus nobilis garland expands through the entire emblem at its right.

== Facilities ==
The club has three facilities to host the practice of different sports. All of them are located in the city of Buenos Aires.

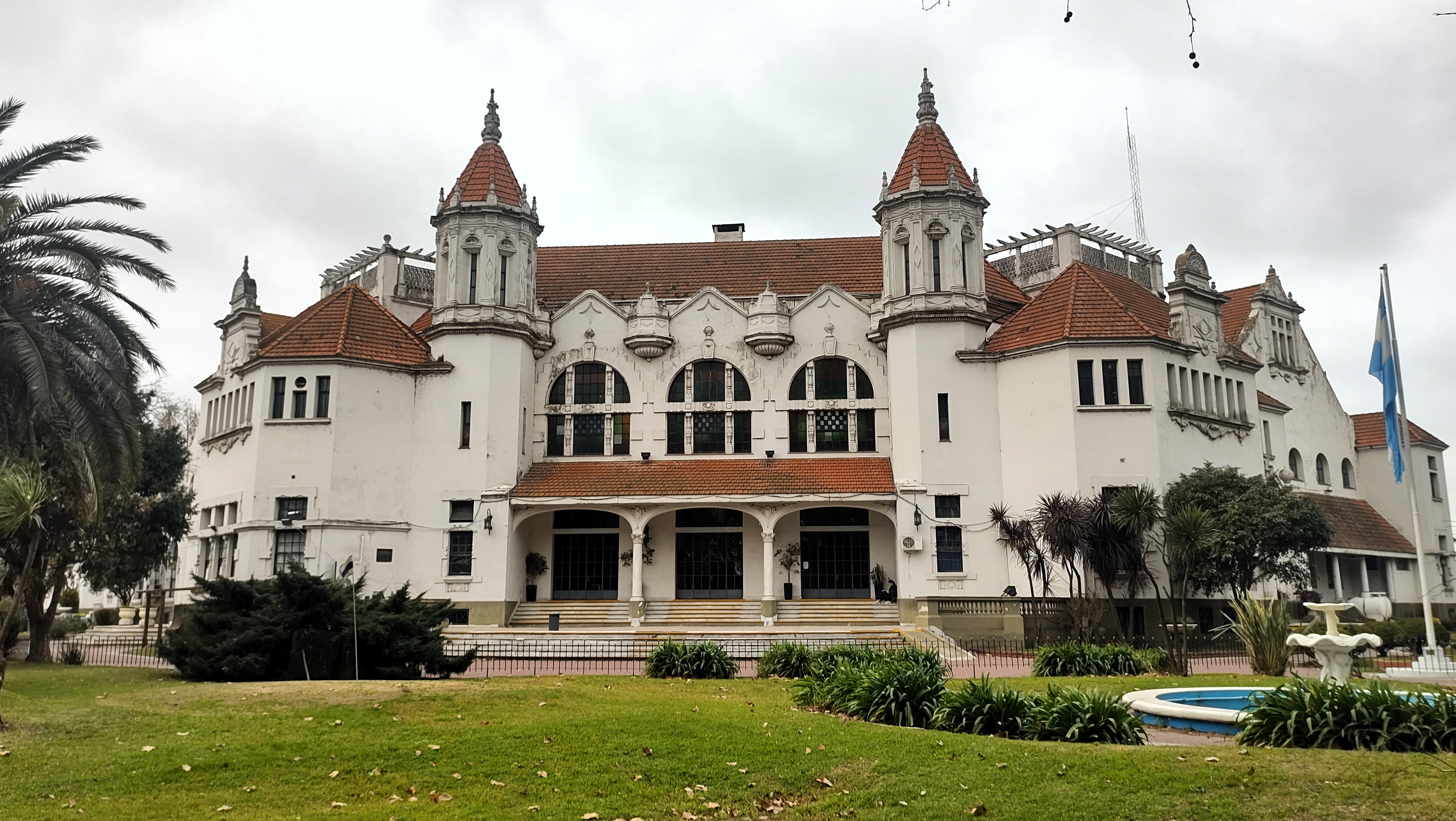
Sede San Martín

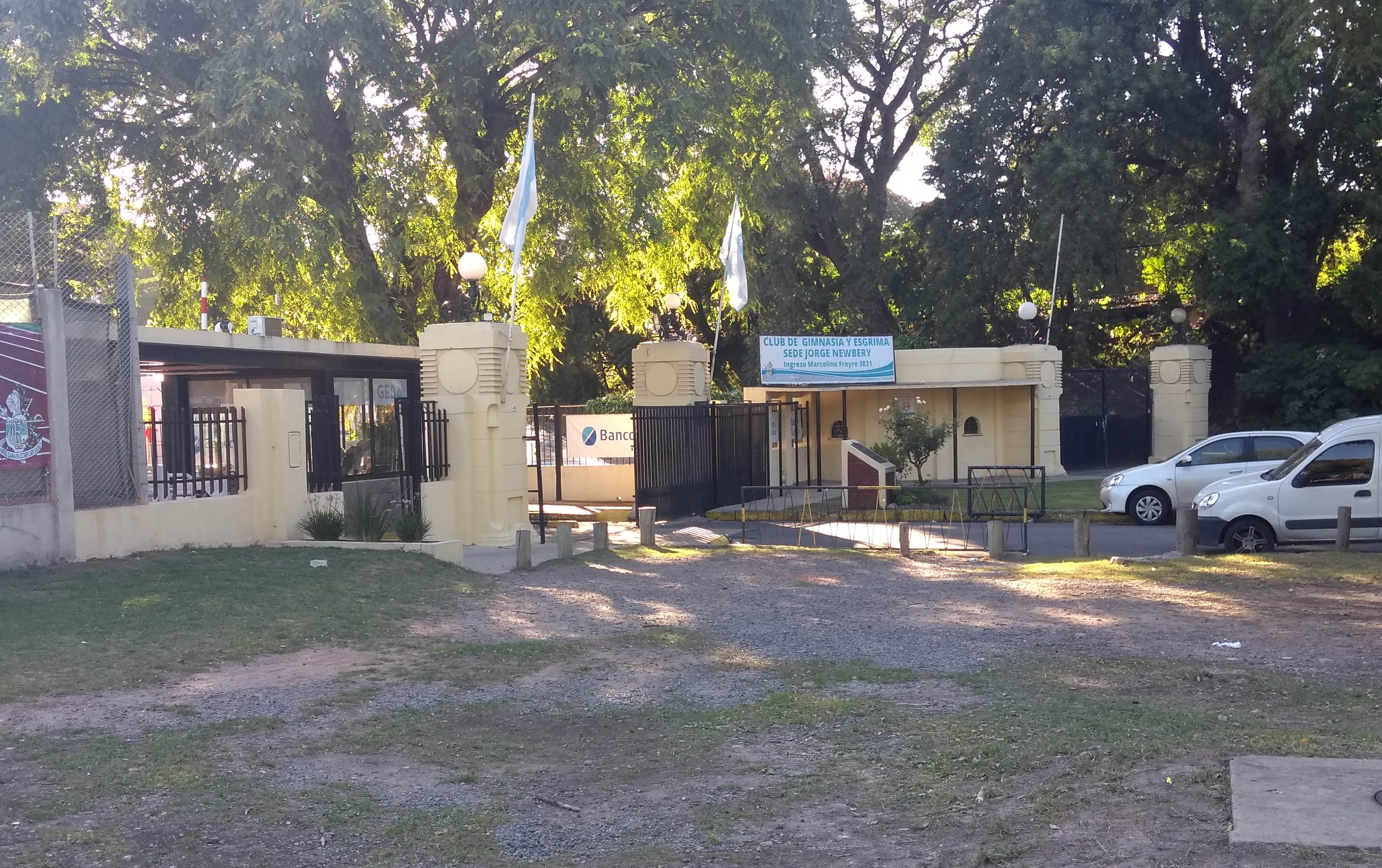
Sede Jorge Newbery

Facility	Sports	Notes	Ref.
San Martín	Field hockey, football, roller hockey, rugby union, tennis, volleyball, artistic roller skating	The biggest facility, with 139,000 m2, on Figueroa Alcorta avenue. The senior rugby team play their home games there.	
R.C. Aldao	Basketball, basque pelota, boxing, contract bridge, chess, fencing, martial arts, artistic gymnastics, swimming, volleyball	Headquarters, named in honour of Ricardo Aldao (1863–1956), one of the most prominent presidents of the institution, also the founder of the dissident league "Federación Argentina de Football" in 1912. With 35,000 m2, the facility is located on Bartolomé Mitre street of the city of Buenos Aires.	
Jorge Newbery	Athletics, basque pelota, field hockey, swimming, tennis, water polo	Named honoring Argentine aviation pioneer Jorge Newbery, who was also a notable fencer (he won the first South American championship at Gimnasia y Esgrima in 1901), died in 1914. The facility occupies 55,000 m2 on Dorrego Avenue, near to Galileo Galilei planetarium in the Palermo district. Estadio GEBA (currently used for concerts) is located there.	

=== Stadium ===
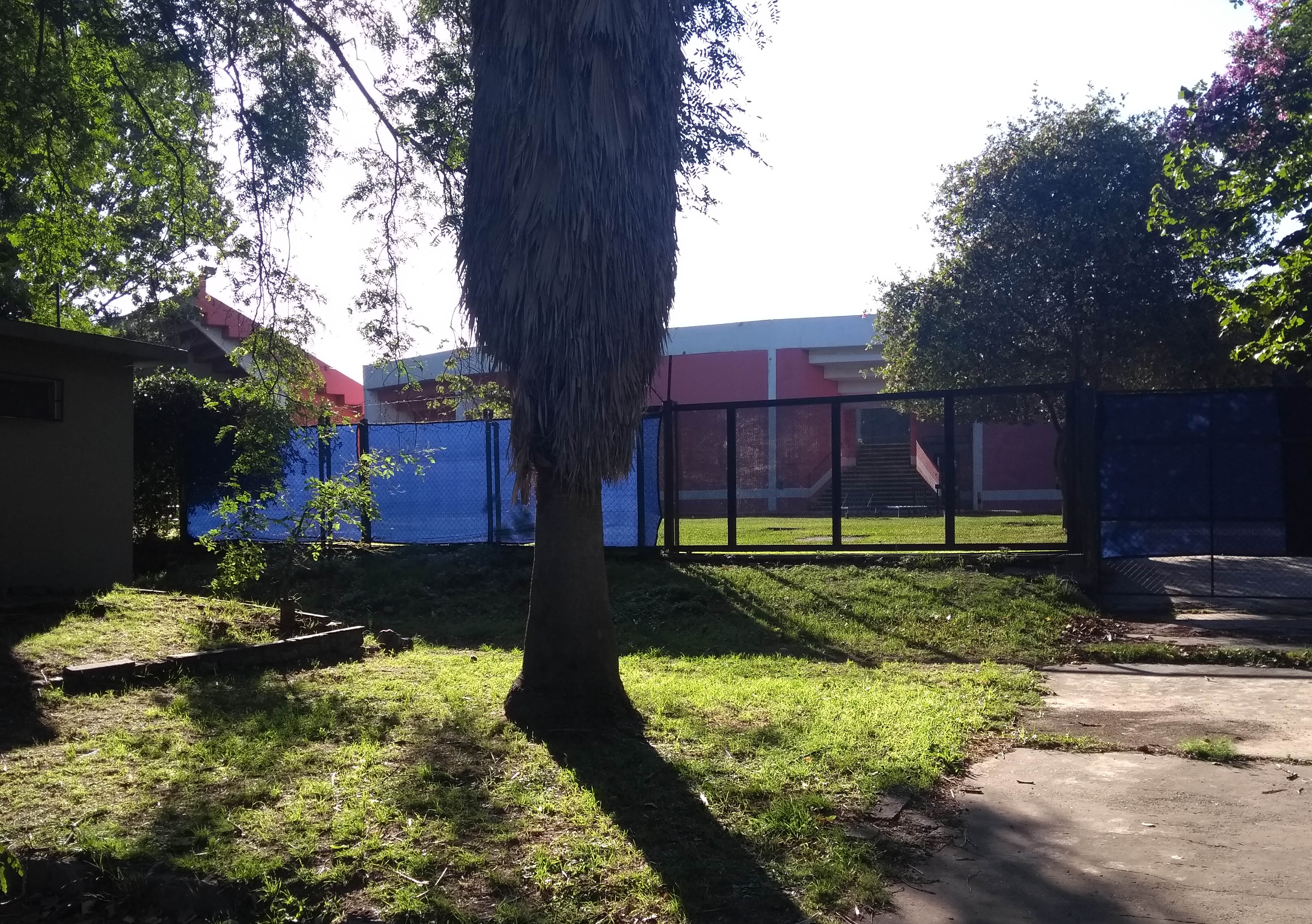
Exterior view of Estadio GEBA

The "Estadio GEBA" is the main venue of the club, with a capacity for 12,000 spectators.

Placed in the "Jorge Newbery" seat, it was the main football venue during the 1900s and 1910s, having held matches of the Argentina national team. The football team of the club (that played in Primera División from 1911 to 1917) also used the stadium for its home games.

In 1916, the stadium was the venue for the match between Argentina and Uruguay for the first Copa América; however, incidents and a fire led to the suspension of the match that was later played at Racing Club's field. (Note: https://www.clarin.com/deportes/futbol/geba-incendio-visperas_0_B1l_bgmv.html)

After the arson of 1916, the stadium would be used for rugby union purposes mainly. Nowadays, Estadio GEBA is used for music concerts, having host a large number of artist performing there.

== Notable athletes ==
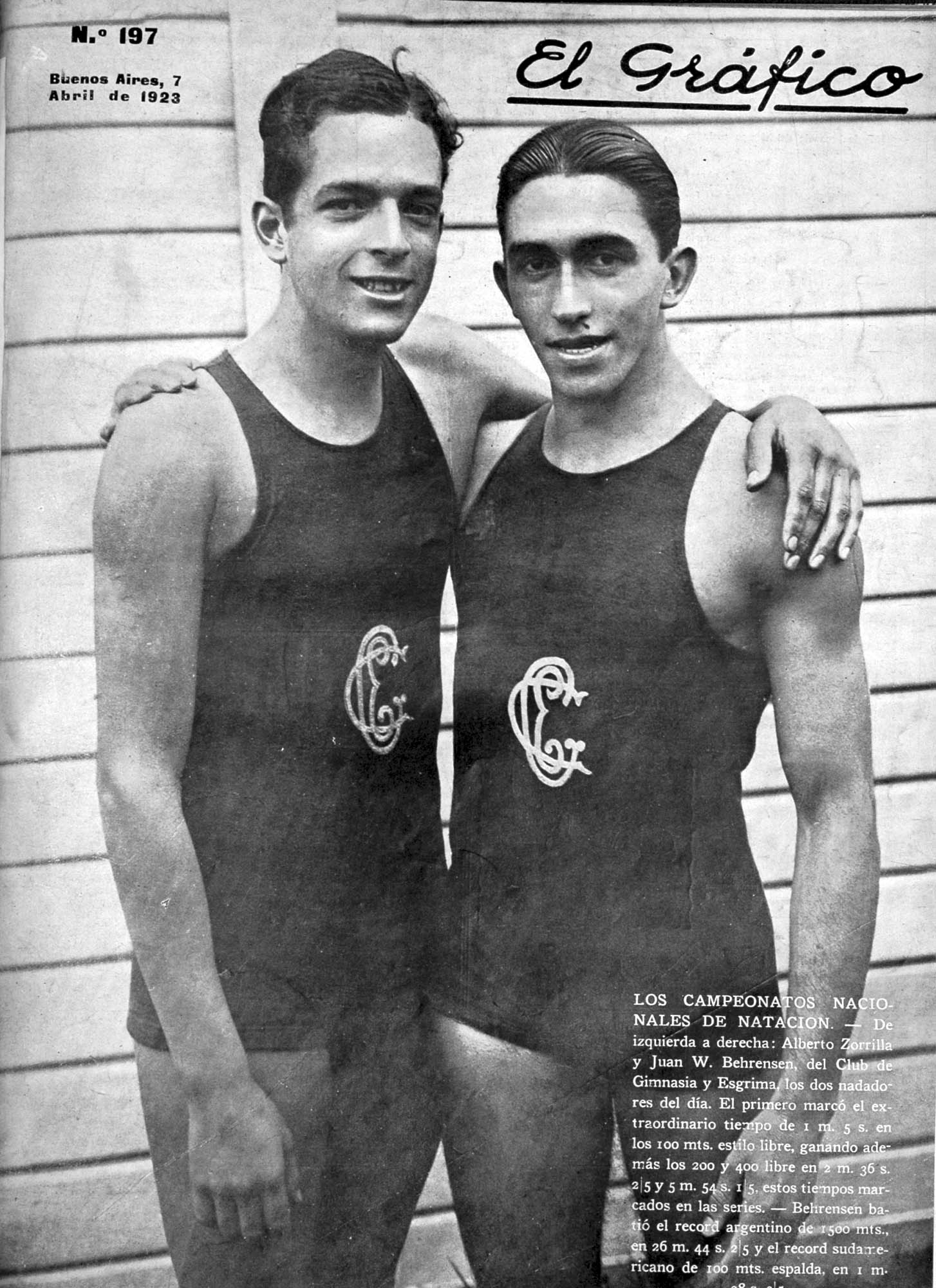
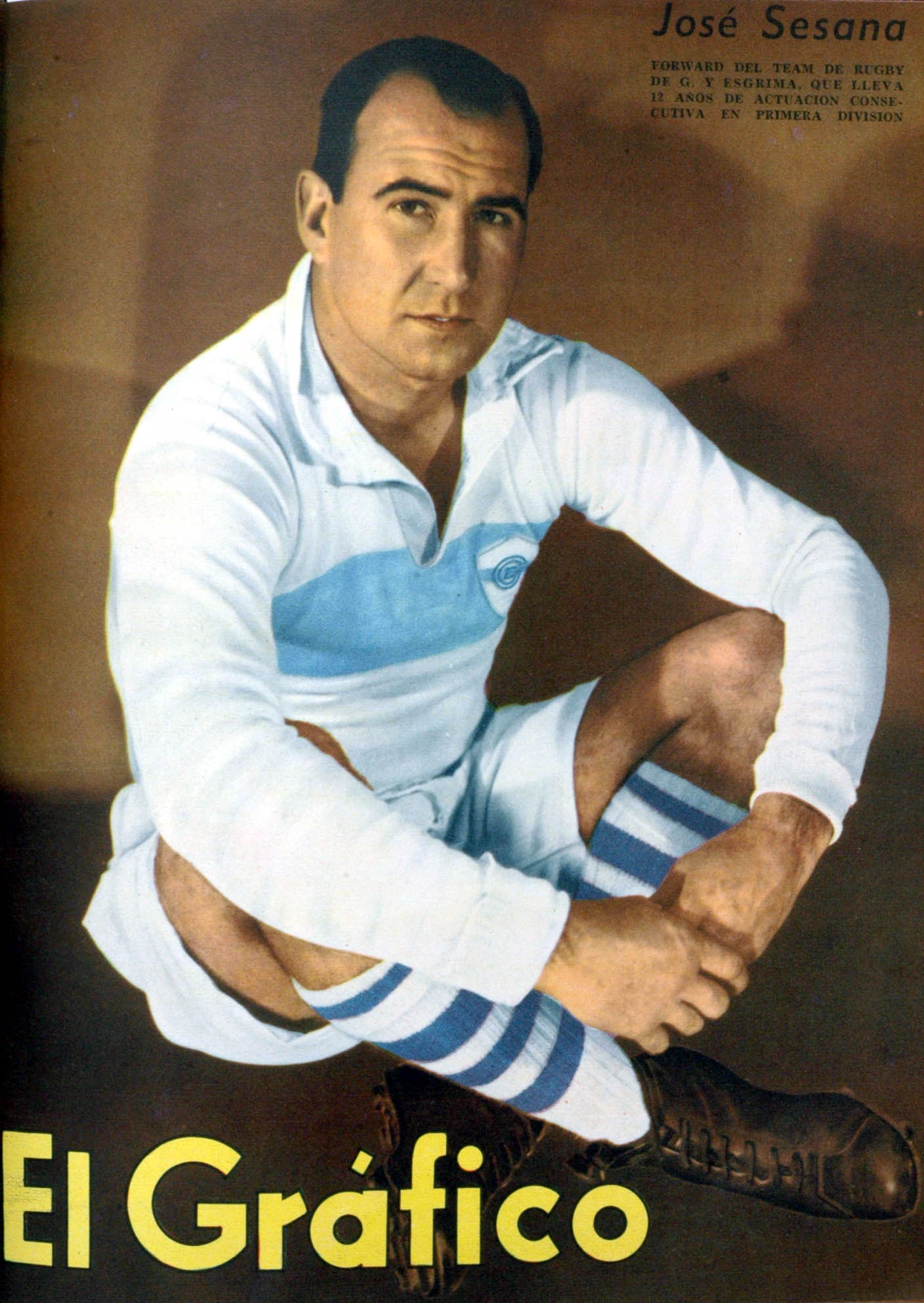
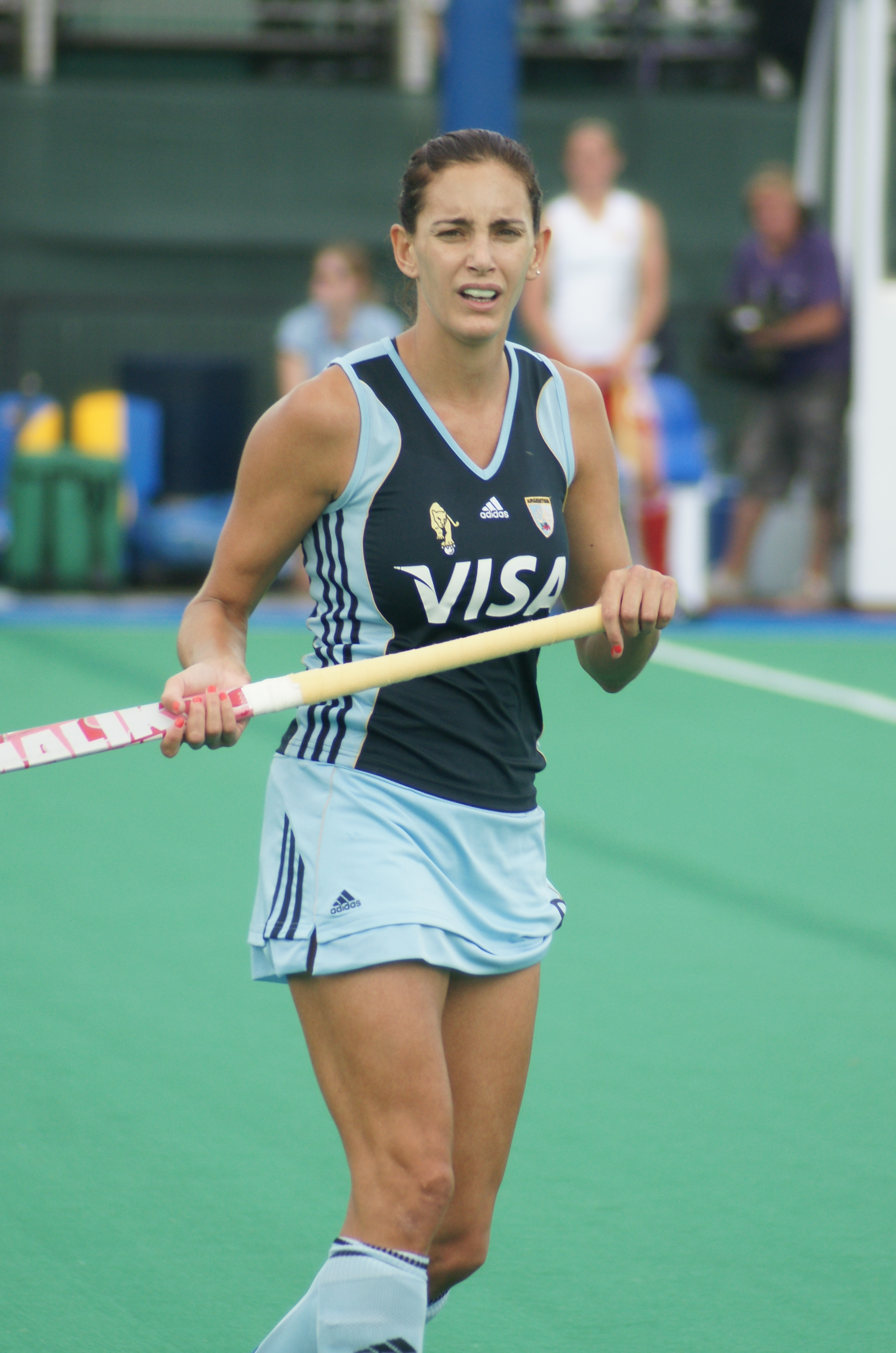
Fltr: Alberto Zorrilla and Juan Behrensen, swimming champions in 1923; José Sesana, rugby player, and Luciana Aymar (field hockey), some of the most notable GEBA athletes that played

Athlete	Sport
(Argentina) Alberto Zorrilla	Swimming
(Argentina) Juan Behrensen	Swimming
(Argentina) Martín Naidich	Swimming
(Argentina) Damián Blaum	Swimming
(Argentina) José Sesana	Rugby union
(Argentina) Luciana Aymar	Field hockey
(Argentina) Jorge Prezioso	Rugby union
(Argentina) Patricio Cammareri	Field hockey
(Argentina) Silvina D'Elía	Field hockey
(Argentina) Florencia Habif	Field hockey

== Honours ==
=== Football ===
==== League ====
- Segunda División (1): 1909
- Tercera División (1): 1906

==== Domestic cups ====
- Copa Bullrich (1): 1907 (Note: The Copa Bullrich was an official football competition contested by clubs playing in the Second Division. The AFA has not included this competition into the list of national cups because only teams in Primera División participated in those competitions.)

=== Basketball ===
- Primera División (2): 2006, 2014

=== Field hockey ===
Women's

- Metropolitano de Primera División (9): 1965, 2007, 2008, 2009, 2010, 2011, 2012, 2013, 2017

=== Rugby union ===
- RPRU (4): 1911, 1912, 1932, 1939
