= Club Atlético San Isidro =

Argentine rugby union team, based in San Isidro

(Argentina) San Isidro (CASI)
- Full name: Club Atlético de San Isidro
- Union: URBA
- Nickname(s): Academia, Cebras
- Founded: 24 October 1902; 124 years ago
- Location: San Isidro, Greater Buenos Aires, Argentina
- Ground(s): Estadio del CASI, San Isidro (Capacity: 4,500)
- President: Pablo Devoto
- Coach: Junior Murgier
- League: Top 14
- 2026: 2nd. (to playoffs)
Team kit

Official website
- casi.org.ar

The Club Atlético de San Isidro (mostly known for its acronym CASI) is an Argentine amateur sports club based in the city of San Isidro in Greater Buenos Aires. Originally established as a football club, San Isidro has gained recognition for its rugby union team, holding a record of 33 Torneo de la URBA championships. The senior squad currently competes at Top 12, the top division of the Unión de Rugby de Buenos Aires league system.

San Isidro has also a notable past in football, with 26 consecutive seasons (from 1906 until 1931) playing in Primera División, the top division of Argentine football league system until the club disaffiliated from the Association when the sport became professional in Argentina. Until then, San Isidro had achieved some international titles such as three Copa de Competencia Jockey Club, one Copa de Honor Municipalidad de Buenos Aires and one international Tie Cup. Nowadays, football is practised at the institution with youth and senior amateur competitions for men and women.

The field hockey section has women's and men's team competing at Metropolitano championships organised by the Buenos Aires Hockey Association.

Apart from rugby, hockey and football, other disciplines hosted by San Isidro are artistic gymnastics, basque pelota, bowls, gaelic football, golf, squash, swimming, taekwondo and tennis.

== History ==
=== Beginning and football years ===
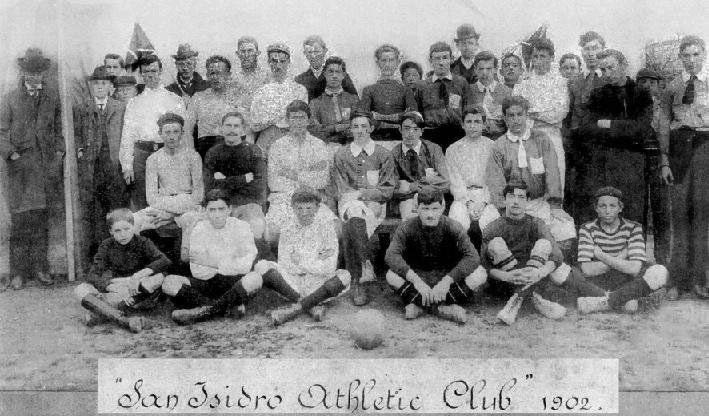
The first football team of the club, then named "San Isidro A.C." (1902)

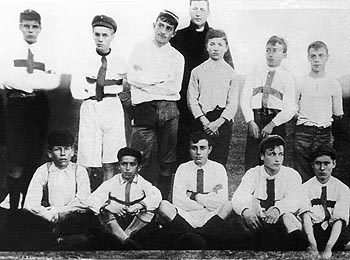
A San Isidro squad using their first jersey, 1902

At the beginning of 1902, a group of young men started to practise football in a field placed in the lowest part of the hill (called "la barranca" in Spanish). That land was the property of María Varela de Beccar, an aristocratic woman that allowed them to play there. Nevertheless, the frequent swells of the Río de la Plata interrupted the matches many times, causing the boys to stop playing the sport they loved. This circumstance plus the adding of a wide group of football enthusiasts that joined them to play, made the boys to think about founding a club.

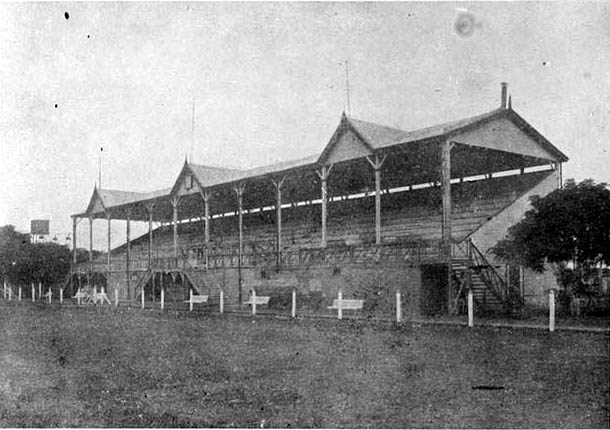
The football stadium in 1922

That group of boys was encouraged by some respectable neighbours of the zone, such as Pedro Becco or Manuel Aguirre, and even Avelino Rolón (who was Intendent of San Isidro Partido in 1906). As a result, soon after Aguirre led part of the lands for an indefinite period of time, where "Club de Foot-ball San Isidro" was founded.

By that time (May 1902) a group (formed by English natives and sons of British), most of them employees of the Central Argentine Railway also began to play football in a field next to the railroad station. Those boys founded a club naming it "San Isidro Athletic Club". Soon after that foundation, in the house of Paterson family, Mr. Hudson, McCrindle, Drenan and Ruiz; and Fernando Tiscornia, Manuel Vernet y Pedro Becco (son) as representatives of both clubs, agreed to call to a general assembly with the purpose of merging both clubs into one.

That meeting was celebrated on 24 October 1902, in the "Vignoles hotel" of San Isidro. 33 members of both clubs attended to the meeting, giving their approval to the merge of both clubs, which result was the foundation of "Club Atlético San Isidro".

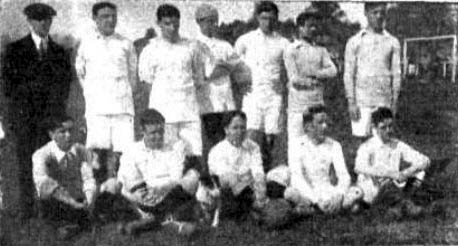
The squad that won the Tie Cup in 1912

The club registered with the Argentine Football Association to play the Segunda División until 1905 when the team promoted to the top level, Primera División.

San Isidro played all the Primera División championships from 1906 to 1931, disaffiliating from AFA when football became professional in Argentina (although the squad remained one season in the amateur league before the two associations merged in 1934). In words from then president of the club, Eduardo Sackmann, "football as a gentlemen and amateur sport, is not for real anymore".

During its football years, San Isidro won one international title, the Tie Cup (played between the Argentine and Uruguayan champions of Copa de Competencia) in 1912, and four domestic cups: three Copa de Competencia and one Copa de Honor. Despite those honours, San Isidro could not win any Primera División championship, being runner-up in 1912, 1913, and 1915.

Since then, football has been practised at CASI –at amateur level– to present, with senior, youth, children and women squads competing in the tournaments organised by the club.

=== Rugby union ===
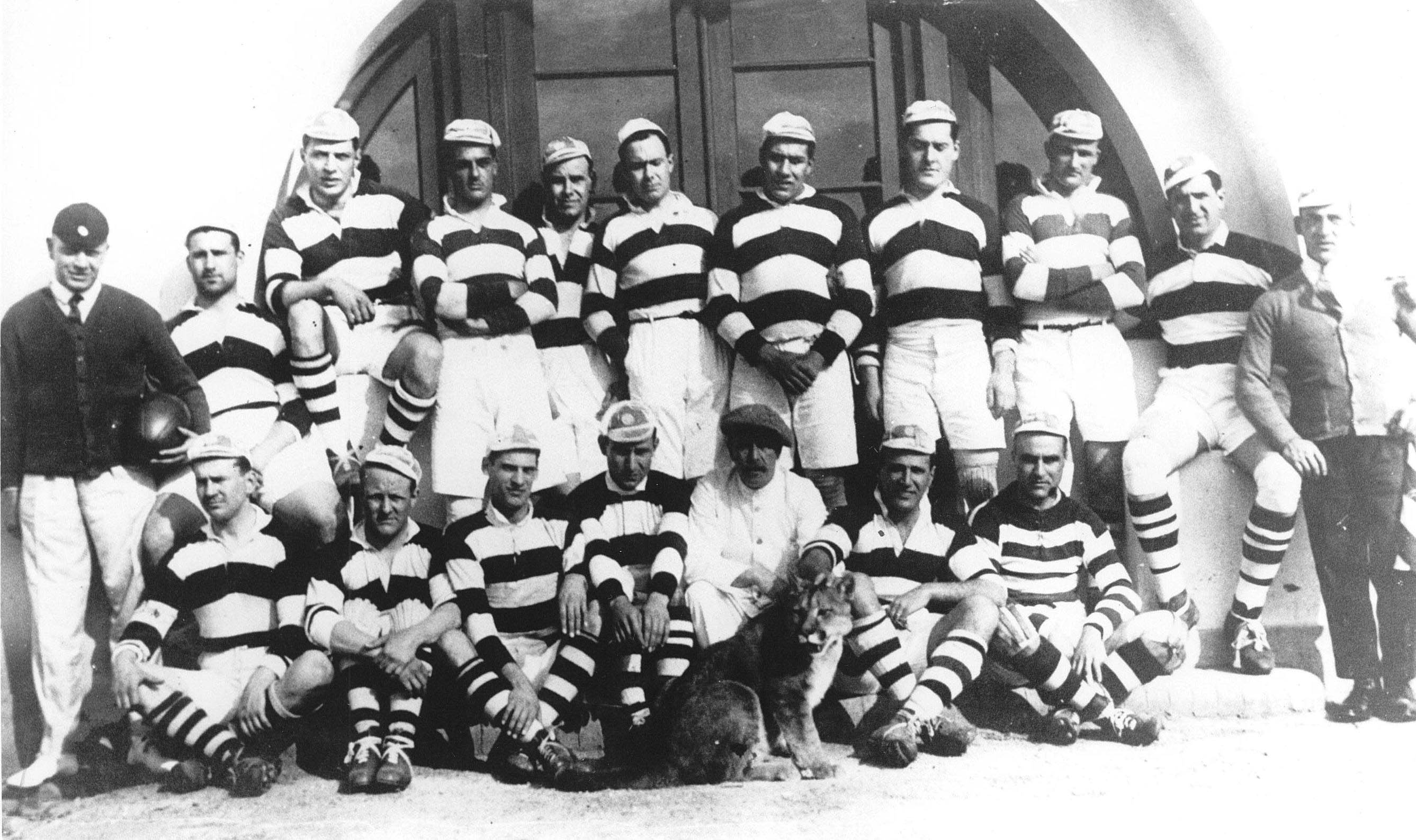
San Isidro team posing with a puma, mascot of the team in 1918

The first rugby team of San Isidro was formed in 1908, combining British-origin employees of the Central Argentine Railway and a few Argentine-born, but it was dissolved in 1911 without having participated in any competition. Six years later, and due to an initiative by club president Rafael Cullen, San Isidro established a new rugby team, registering with the River Plate Rugby Union that same year. San Isidro won its first title in 1917, setting a record of 13 consecutive championships won (until 1930).

In 1935 the club held the traditional meeting with the rival team after a match, where no women attended. During the dinner, one of the guests spilled a cup of wine over his pants, which he took off and continued eating. The rest of the players that were sat at the table showed their solidarity with him and also took their pants and continued with the dinner as if nothing had happened.

This was seen by a member of the club who related the incident to club's authorities. As a result, eleven players were suspended by CASI for periods from one to two years. Since the suspension was effective, the team lost the most games played, finishing 6th at the end of the season (Atlético del Rosario was the champion).

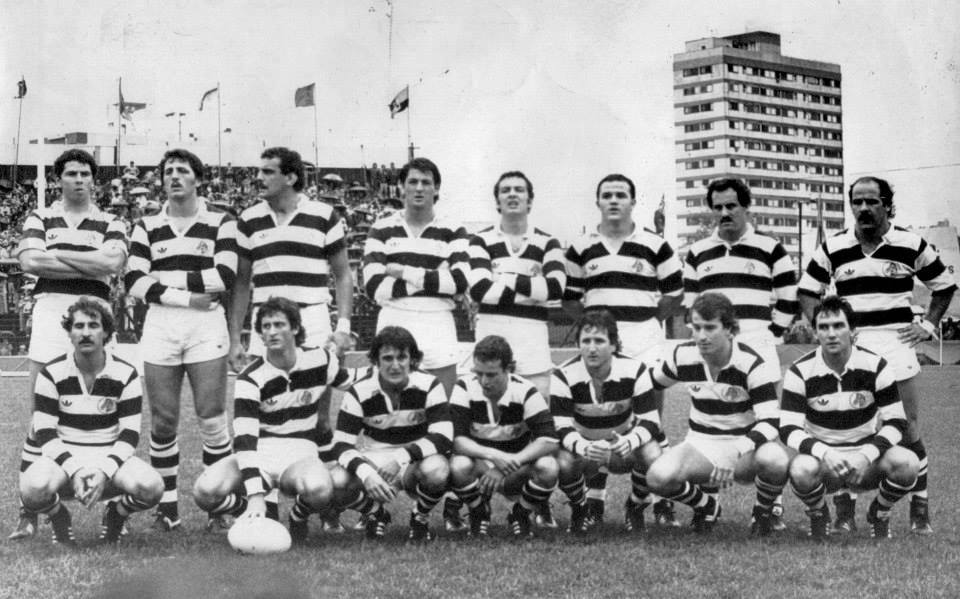
The CASI team that played All Blacks in Buenos Aires, 1985

At the end of 1935 Julio Urien was elected president of CASI for a new period, therefore the banned players left the club to found their own institution, which they called San Isidro Club (mostly known for its acronym "SIC" within rugby community). Since then, both clubs developed a strong rivalry which has remained to date.

San Isidro has won 33 URBA titles and one Nacional de Clubes to date, becoming the most winning rugby union club of Argentina. Within rugby community, San Isidro is mostly known for its acronym "CASI" instead of full name.

=== Field hockey ===
San Isidro was one of the founding members of Argentine Hockey Confederation, along with Belgrano A.C. and Pacific Railway A.C. The women's field hockey team won their first Metropolitano championships in the 1940s. The club inaugurated the first synthetic surface field in 2000. C.A. San Isidro currently has more than 700 players registered.

== Uniform evolution ==
Football and rugby teams have worn different uniforms through the club's history. In football, the most representative uniform was the light blue jersey, which San Isidro worn during its tenure on Argentine Primera División until the team disaffiliated from the association when football became professional.

In rugby union, San Isidro's first colors were green and red since 1907, when the club opened its rugby section. Nevertheless, rugby section was closed in 1908, being inactive until 1916. In that year, the club wore a red shirt (taking the colors from the Facultad de Medicina team) to play their matches. In 1917 CA San Isidro affiliated to The River Plate Rugby Union, playing the RPRU championship (and winning their first title) still wearing the red shirt. For their second season in 1918, the black and white shirt was adopted, being chosen by president of the club, Rafael Cullen. The model was inspired on the kit of British side Barbarians. The black and white have been used by the rugby teams since then.

=== Football ===
1902–03	1903–09	1909–31

=== Rugby union ===
1907–08 (Note: The rugby section was closed in 1908 and not reopened until 1916.)	1916–17 (Note: The shirt debuted in friendly matches in 1916. When the club affiliated to UAR in 1917, they played the entire season with this shirt.)	1918–present (Note: The shirt debuted in the 1918 season.)

== Facilities ==
The club has four facilities located in the San Isidro and Tigre partidos, they are:

Facility	Sports and activities	Notes	Ref.
San Isidro	Rugby, field hockey, tennis, swimming, paleta, bowls, paddle tennis, football (5-a-side), bridge, billiards	Club headquarters, occupies 6 hectares near the commercial centre of San Isidro. Includes the club's stadium, nicknamed La Catedral	
La Boya – Campo Rafael Cullen	Rugby union, field hockey	Composed of three rugby fields (one of them with artificial turf), field hockey field (synthetic), and gymnasium	
La Playita	Water sports	Situated on the edge of Río de la Plata	
Anexo Benavídez	Rugby, football	In the homonymous city of Tigre Partido	
San Isidro Labrador Golf	Golf	Also in Benavídez, has a 18-holes golf course	

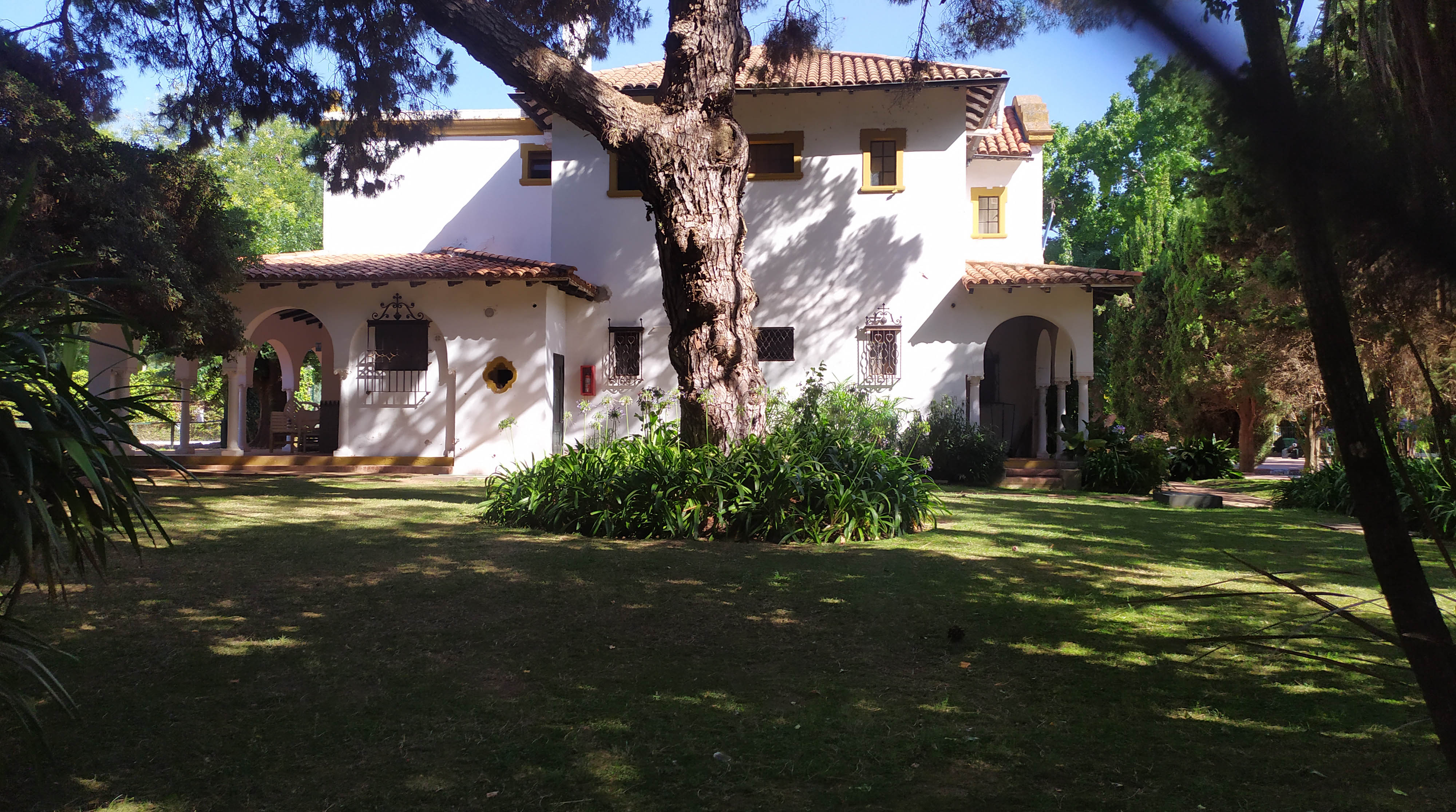
Building

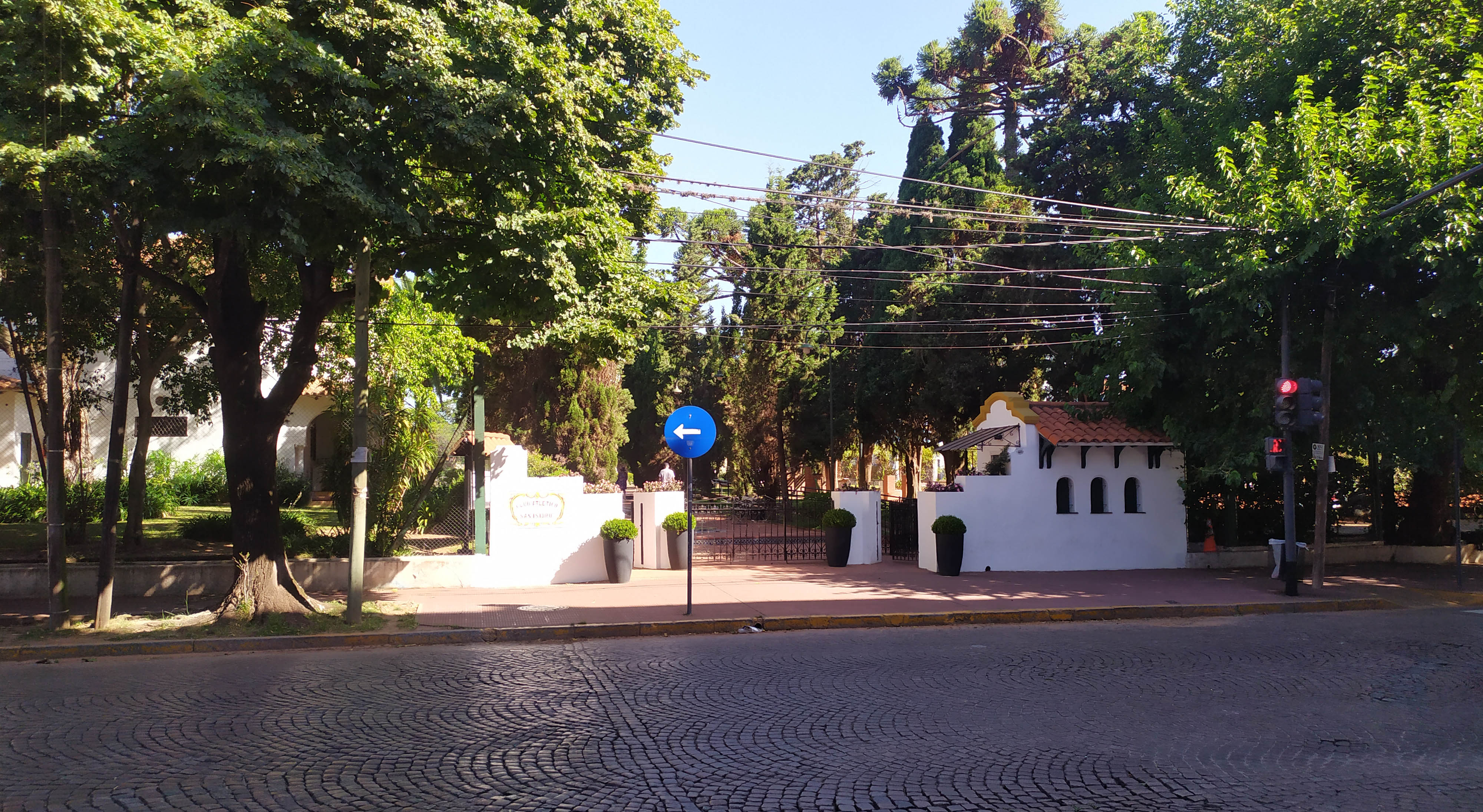
Main entrance

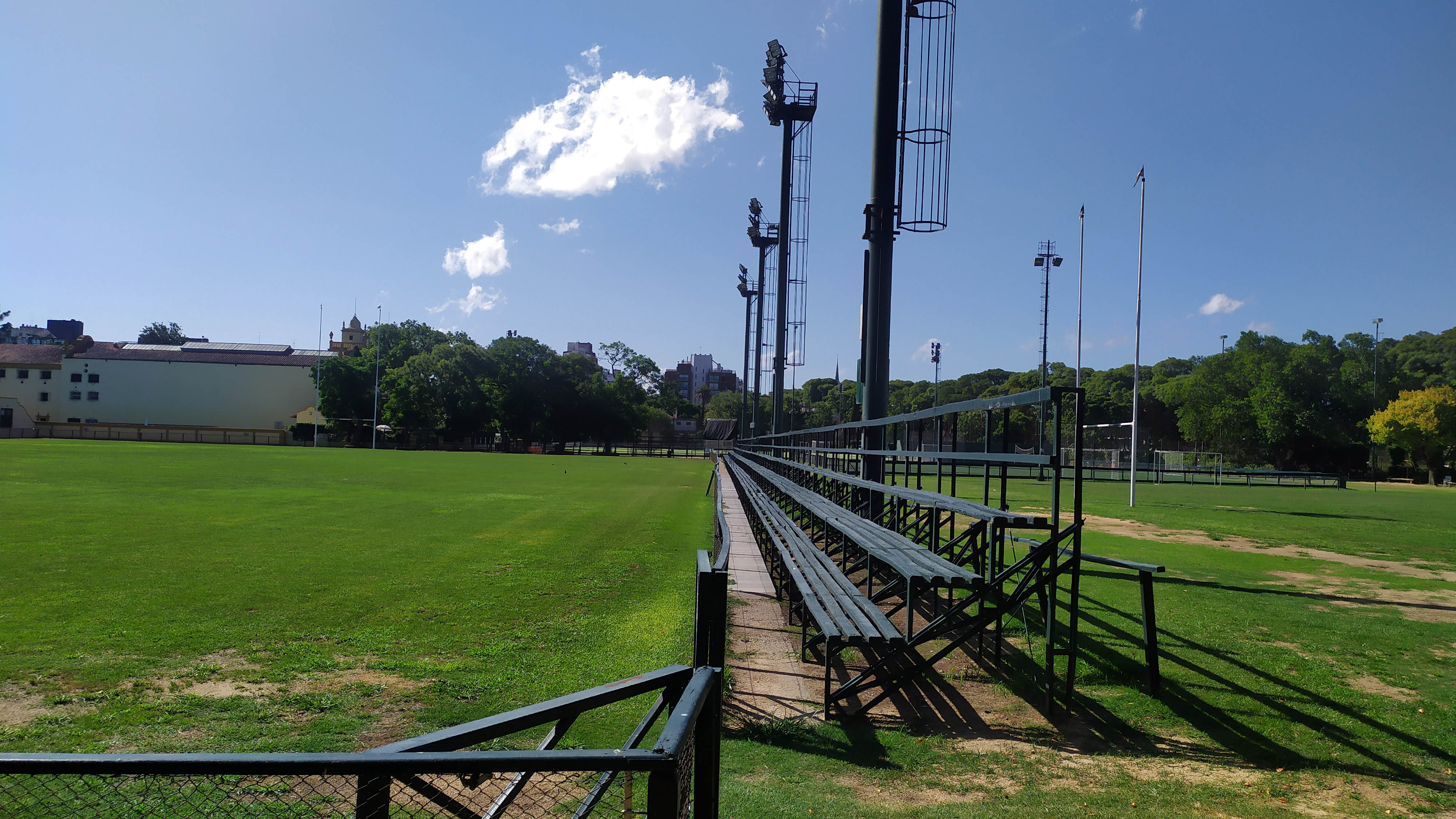
Main and auxiliary rugby pitch

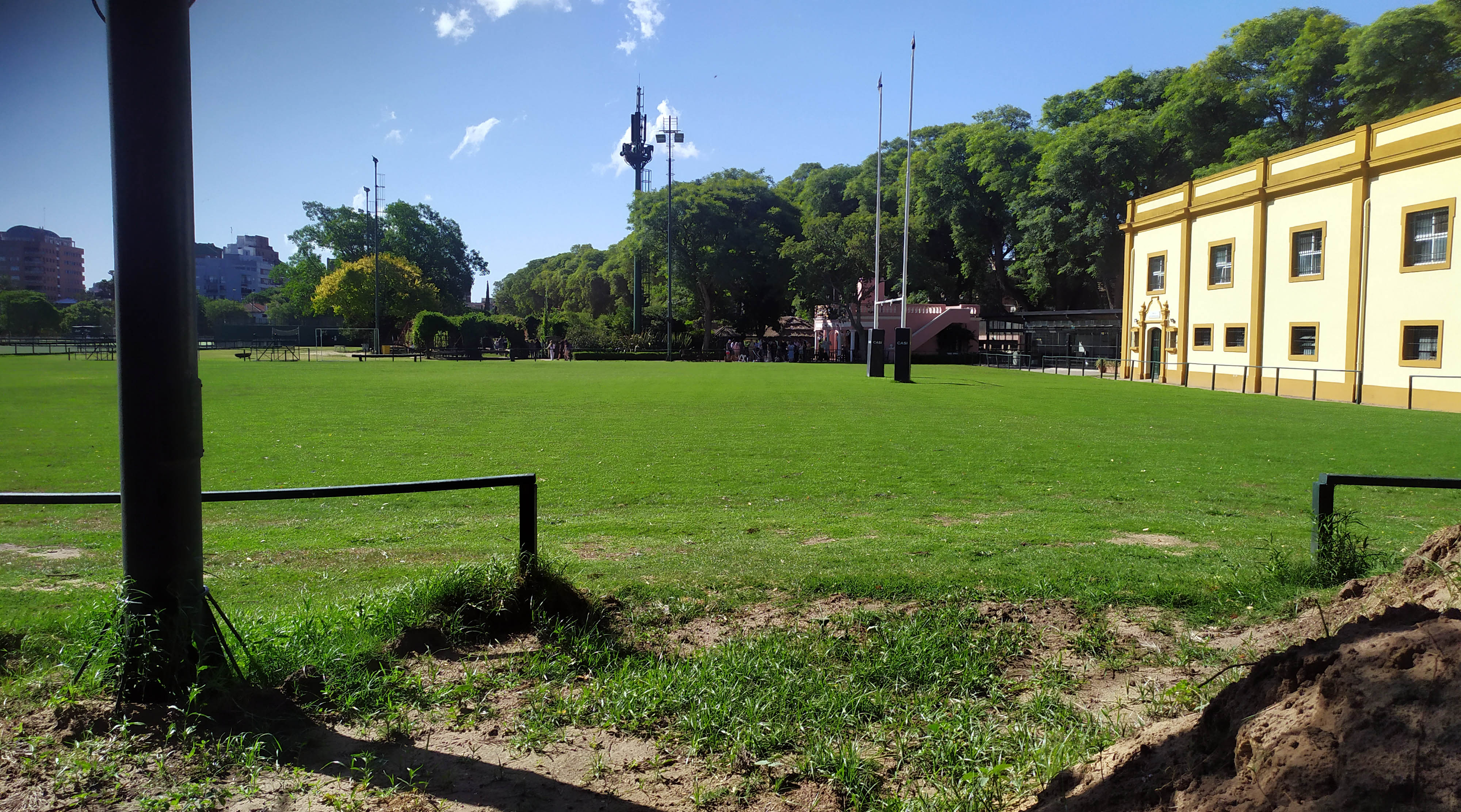
Auxiliary rugby pitch

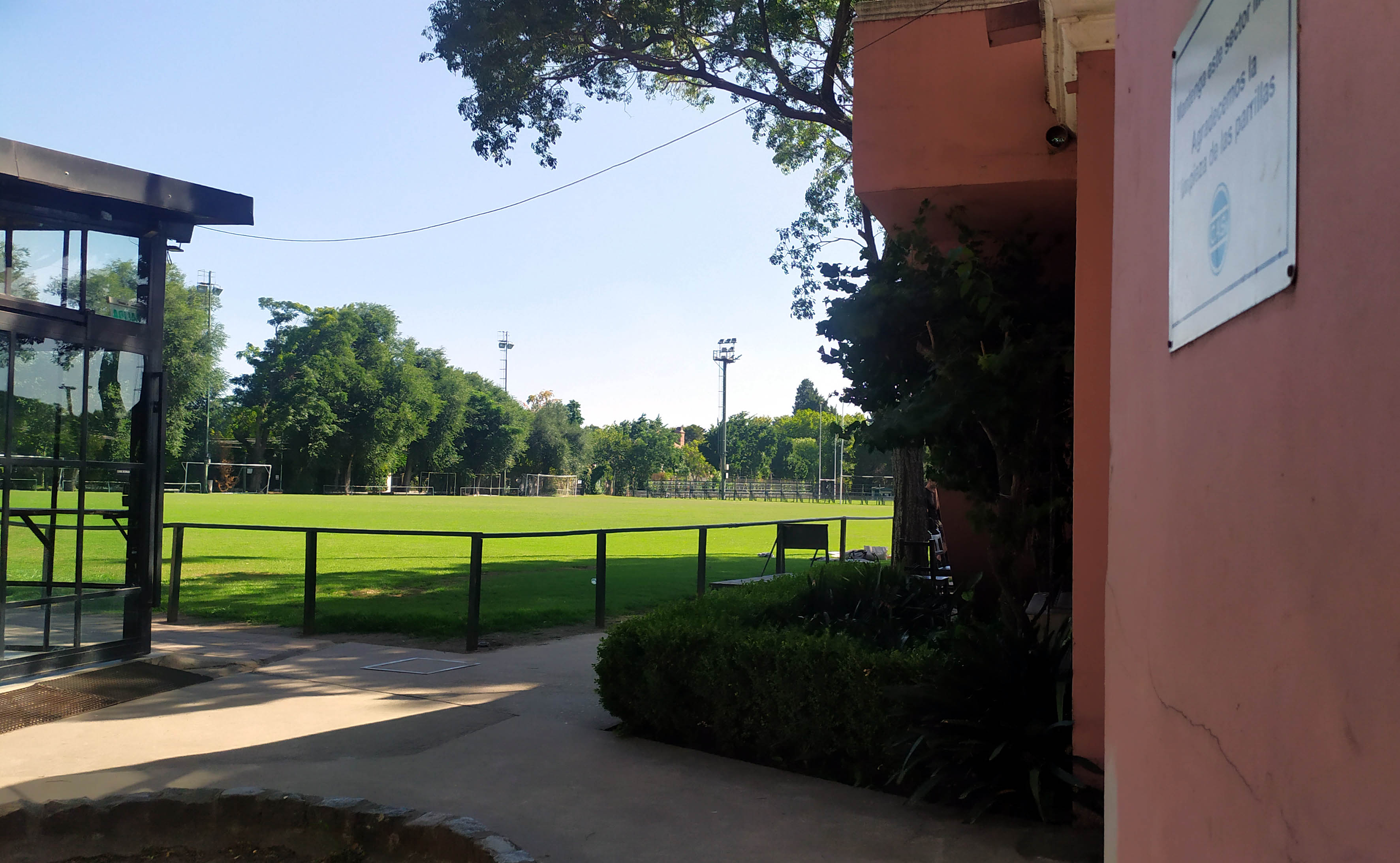
Football pitch

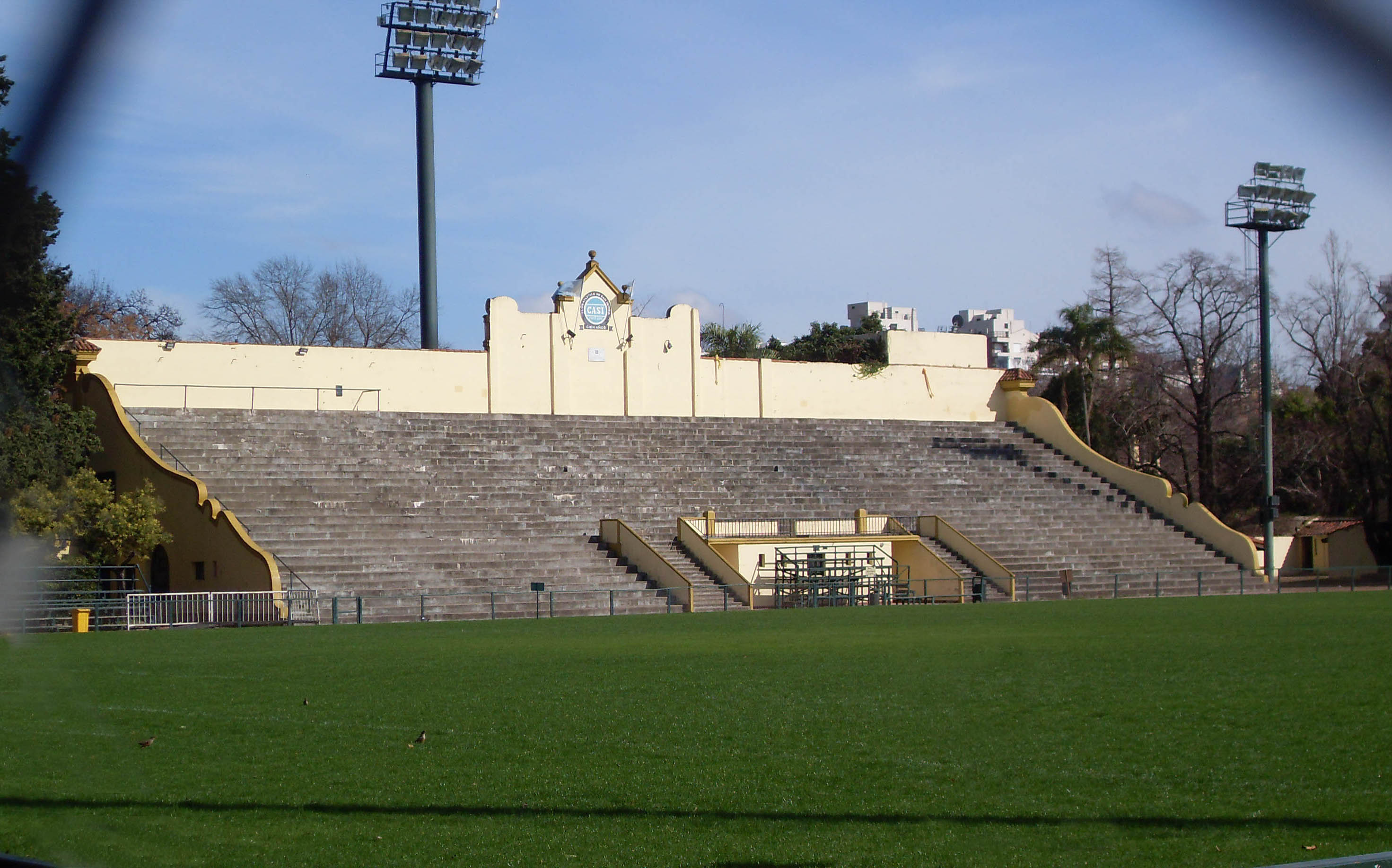
La Catedral main stand

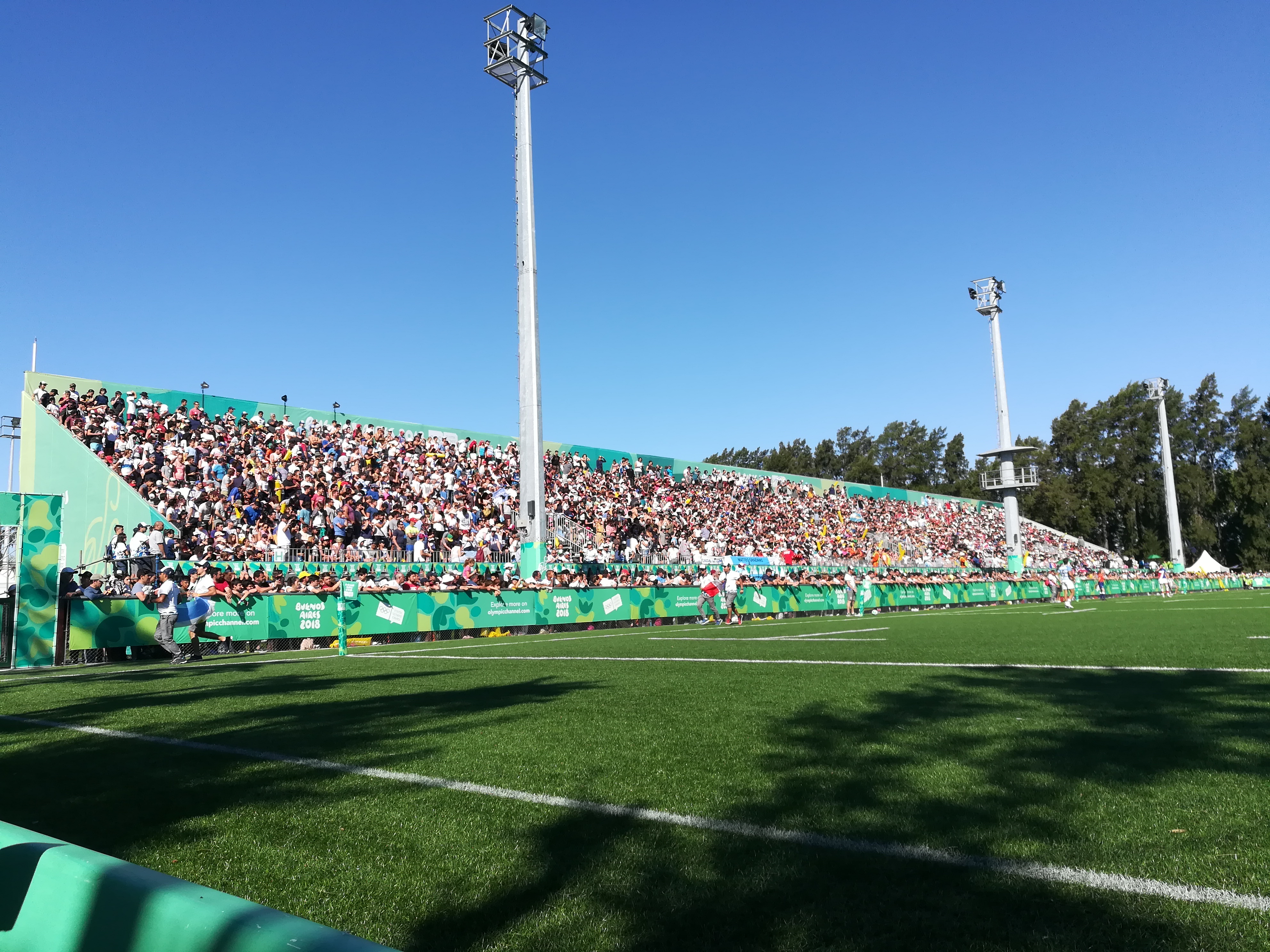
La Boya rugby venue

== Rivalry ==
CASI main rival is the San Isidro Club (SIC) since both clubs were separated. This rivalry is so strong that has been nicknamed as "The Superclásico of Argentine rugby". As of April 2019, CASI and SIC have played 130 matches, with 68 won by CASI and 52 by SIC.

=== Highlights ===
- The first match played between SIC and CASI was on 9 May 1937, being SIC the winner by 3–0.
- The largest victory over SIC was a 51–7 on 25 August 2013.
- The most important derby played by CASI and SIC was the final of 2005 Torneo de la URBA championship, which CASI won 18–17 with a penalty in the last minutes, after 20 years without an URBA title.
- The largest defeat against SIC was a 55–18 on 28 August 2004.

== Notable former rugby players ==
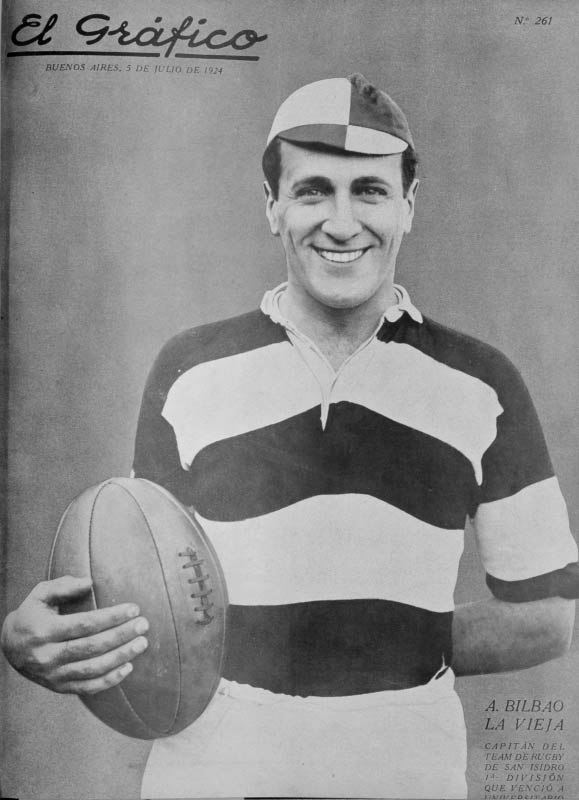
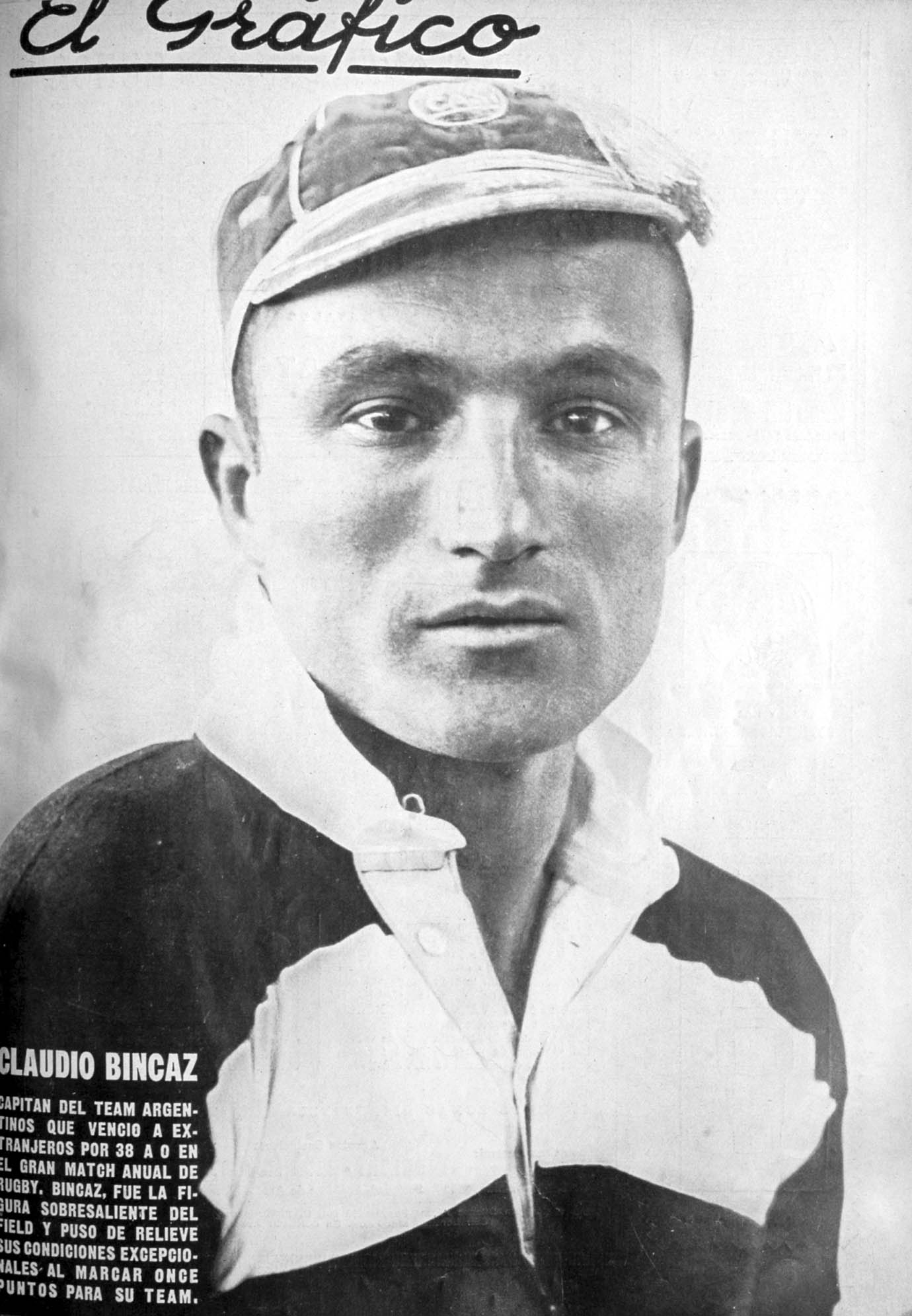
Antonio Bilbao La Vieja (left) and Claudio Bincaz (right), as they were covered on El Gráfico magazine in the 1920s
- Antonio Bilbao La Vieja
- Claudio Bincaz (Note: Also a notable footballer for the club, even playing for the Argentina national team.)
- Arturo Rodríguez Jurado
- Jorge Stewart
- Ernesto Cilley
- Nicanor González del Solar
- Alejandro Puccio
- Rodolfo O'Reilly
- Gustavo Pagni
- Jorge Allen
- Christian Martin
- Gonzalo Beccar Varela
- Eliseo Branca
- Santiago Phelan (1992–2003)
- Agustín Pichot (1992–97)
- Gabriel Travaglini
- Bruno María Devoto

== Honours ==
=== Football ===
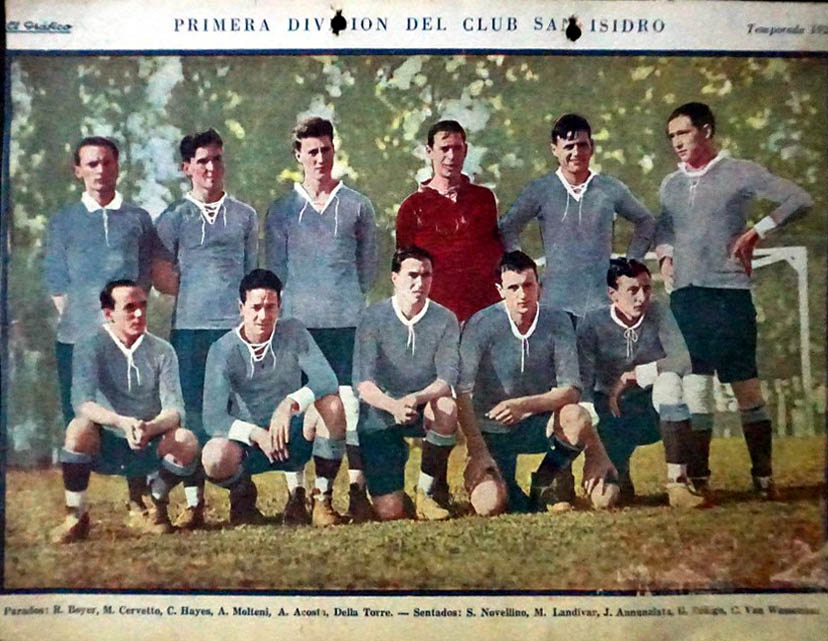
San Isidro football team of 1926

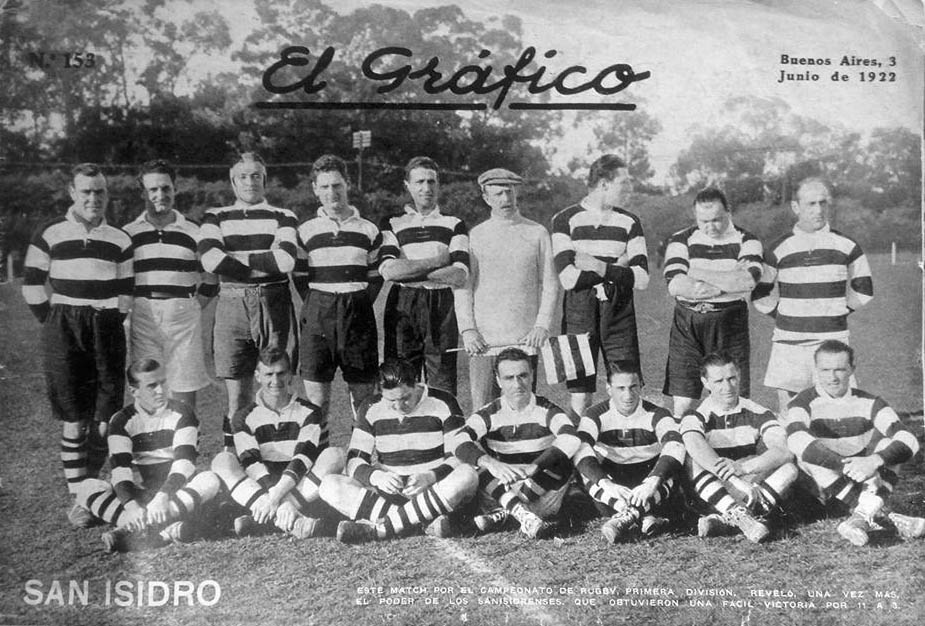
The rugby team that won the RPRU championship in 1922

==== National ====
- Copa de Competencia Jockey Club (3): 1911, 1912, 1913
- Copa de Honor MCBA (1): 1909

==== International ====
- Tie Cup (1): 1912

=== Rugby union ===
- Nacional de Clubes (1): 1995
- URBA Top 14 (33): 1917, 1918, 1920, 1921, 1922, 1923, 1924, 1925, 1926, 1927, 1928, 1929, 1930, 1933, 1934,
  1943, 1949, 1954, 1955, 1956, 1957, 1960, 1961, 1962, 1964, 1967, 1974, 1975, 1976, 1981, 1982, 1985, 2005
- Campeonato Sudamericano (1): 1986

=== Field hockey ===
==== Men's ====
- Metropolitano Primera División (4): 1908, 1921, 1926, 1948

==== Women's ====
- Metropolitano Primera División (5): 1943, 1944, 1966, 1967, 1969
