= Alfredo Martín (footballer) =

Argentine footballer

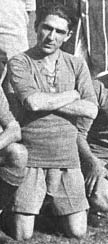
- Martín with Boca Juniors

Personal information
- Full name: Alfredo Ángel Martín
- Date of birth: 30 April 1894
- Date of death: 24 October 1955 (aged 61)
- Position: Forward

Senior career*
| Years | Team | Apps | (Gls) |
| 1911–1914 | Hispano Argentino | | |
| 1914–1916 | River Plate | | |
| 1916–1918 | Tigre | | |
| 1918–1923 | Boca Juniors | 77 | (30) |

International career
| 1917–1919 | Argentina | 10 | (2) |
- * Club domestic league appearances and goals

Alfredo Ángel Martín (30 April 1894 – 24 October 1955) was an Argentine footballer who played as forward. Martín started his career in Hispano Argentino. He then played for River Plate, Tigre and Boca Juniors where he finished his career in 1923.

Martín won a total of 9 titles in his career, 1 with River Plate and 8 with Boca Juniors. He played 77 matches for Boca Juniors and scored 30 goals.

Martín also played in ten matches for the Argentina national football team from 1917 to 1919. He was part of Argentina's squad for the 1917 South American Championship.

== Titles ==
River Plate

- Tie Cup (1): 1914

Boca Juniors

- Primera División (3): 1919, 1920, 1923
- Copa de Competencia Jockey Club (1): 1919
- Copa Ibarguren (2): 1919, 1923
- Tie Cup (1): 1919
- Copa de Honor Cousenier (1): 1920
