= 1918 Copa Jockey Club final =

1918 Copa de Competencia Jockey Club Final
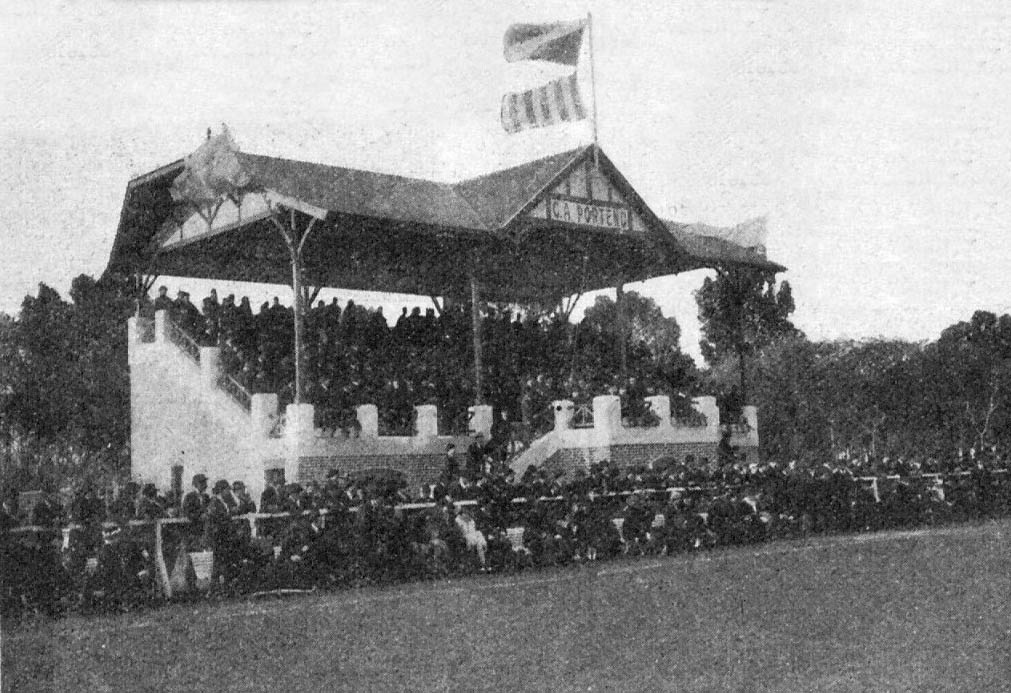
- C.A. Porteño Field in Palermo, venue
- Event: 1918 Copa de Competencia
Porteño	River Plate
2	1
- Date: ? 1918
- Venue: C.A. Porteño Field, Buenos Aires

The 1918 Copa de Competencia Jockey Club final was the football match that decided the champion of the 12th. edition of this National cup of Argentina. In the match, played at the Porteño Stadium in Palermo, Porteño defeated River Plate 2–1 to win their second Copa de Competencia trophy.

== Qualified teams ==
Team	Previous final app.
Porteño	**1915**
River Plate	**1914**

Note

- **Bold** indicates winning years

== Overview ==
The 1918 edition was contested by 44 clubs, 42 within Buenos Aires Province and 2 from Liga Rosarina de Football. Porteño started in the group of 32, where they eliminated Hispano Argentino 2–1, then beating Tigre 6–1 (at C.A. Atlanta Stadium). In the round of 8, they defeated Huracán 5–2 in extra time. In quarter and semifinal, Porteño finally eliminated River Plate and Rosario A.C. respectively, to earn their place in the final.

On the other hand, River Plate won all their matches by the same score, 1–0, eliminating (in order): Progresista, San Isidro, arch-rival Boca Juniors, Estudiantes de La Plata, and Gimnasia y Esgrima de Rosario in semifinal earning their right to play the final.

== Road to the final ==
- H: home
- A: away
- N: neutral

Porteño		Round	River Plate	
Opponent	Result	Group stage	Opponent	Result
Gimnasia y Esgrima (BA)	4–0 (H)	First round	Progresista	1–0 (H)
Almagro	4–2 (A)	Second round	San Isidro	1–0 (A)
Estudiantes (BA)	2–0 (H)	Round of 8	Boca Juniors	1–0 (A)
Ferro Carril Oeste	4–1 (H)	Quarterfinal	Estudiantes (LP)	1–0 (H)
Tiro Federal	2–1 (H)	Semifinal	Gimnasia y Esgrima (R)	1–0 (A)

== Match details ==
1918 Copa Competencia Final
? 1918

Porteño	2–1	River Plate

C.A. Porteño Field, Buenos Aires

**Porteño**
**River Plate**
