= Pedro Calomino =

Argentine footballer

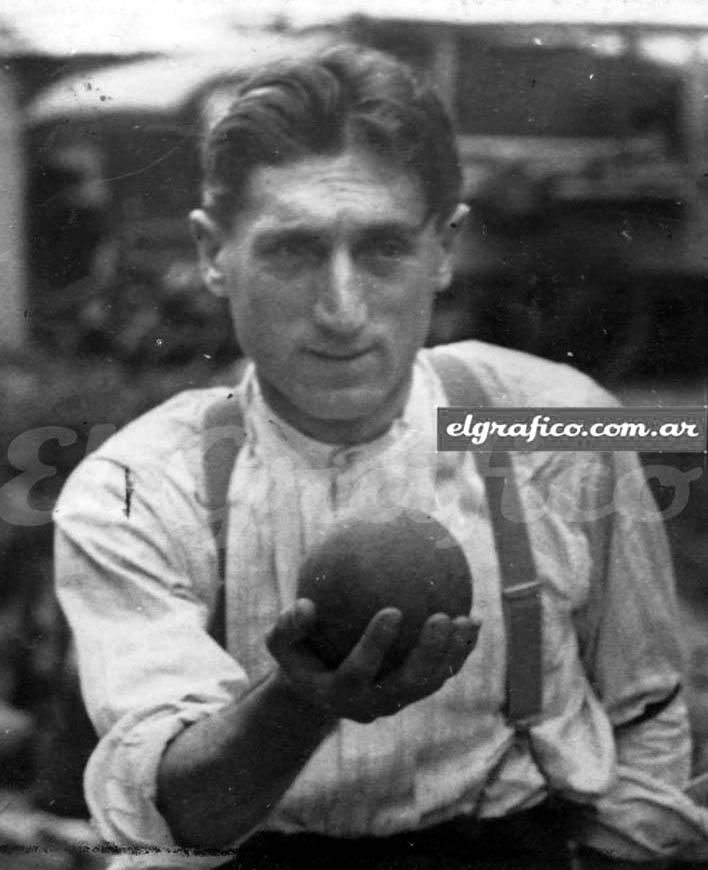

Personal information
- Full name: Bleo Pedro Fournol Calomino
- Date of birth: 13 March 1892
- Place of birth: Buenos Aires, Argentina
- Date of death: 12 January 1950 (aged 57)
- Position: Winger

Senior career*
Years	Team	Apps	(Gls)
1911–1913	Boca Juniors	28	(12)
1914	Hispano Argentino		(?)
1915–1924	Boca Juniors	194	(85)

International career
1917–1921	Argentina	37	(5)
- * Club domestic league appearances and goals

Bleo Pedro Fournol, mostly known as Pedro Calomino (also nicknamed Calumín) (Note: He was born "Bleo Pedro Fournol", but took the name "Calomino" after the family who raised him) (13 March 1892 – 12 January 1950) was an Argentine footballer who played as right winger. Calomino spent nearly all of his career in Boca Juniors, having also played 37 games for the Argentina national team where he scored 5 goals. It is claimed that Calomino invented the step over move

Calomino is also regarded to be the first idol of Boca Juniors –where he won 9 titles– and one of the best right wingers of Argentina. With Argentina he won the 1921 South American Championship, the first official title for the national team. He is also the earliest known player to use the classic skill move - the stepover.

== Club career ==
A representative of Boca Juniors saw Calomino playing in a field in Retiro and convinced him to play for the club. Calomino debuted in the third division v River Plate. His good performances led him to be promoted to upper divisions, debuting in the senior squad in 1911, when Boca still played in Segunda División. In 1912 he moved to Argentino de Quilmes, where he was soon regarded as the best right winger in Argentina.

Calomino had brief returns to Boca Juniors (1913) and Argentino de Quilmes (1914), also playing for Hispano Argentino until 1915 when he returned to Boca Juniors, playing there until the end of his career in 1924. Calomino played a total of 222 games for Boca scoring 96 goals. He was Boca Juniors' top scoring player in six seasons: 1913, 1915, 1916, 1917, 1918 and 1919. This record has only been surpassed by Martín Palermo, who accomplished the feat eight times.

On May 25, 1940, when the club inaugurated La Bombonera, Calomino was appointed by the club to raise the Argentine flag during the ceremony.

== International career ==
Calomino debuted in the national team on 15 August 1917 v Uruguay. He represented Argentina in four South American Championships: 1917, 1919, 1920 and 1921. In his final tournament, he captained Argentina to victory.

== Honours ==
=== Club ===
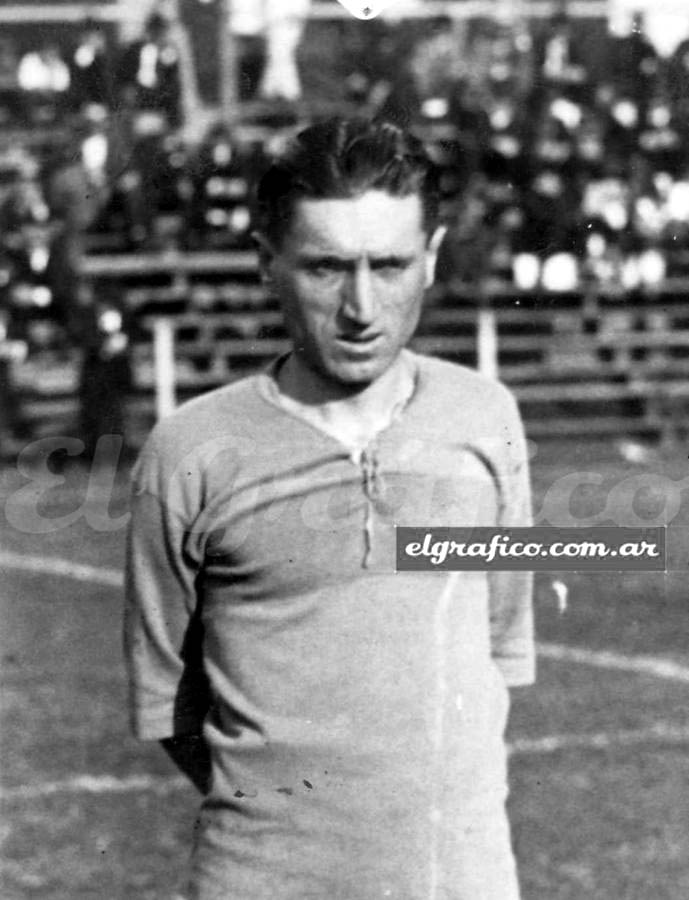
Calomino with Boca Juniors, where he spent most of his career winning nine titles

Boca Juniors

- Primera División (4): 1919, 1920, 1923, 1924
- Copa Competencia Jockey Club (1): 1919
- Copa Ibarguren (2): 1919, 1923
- Tie Cup (1): 1919
- Copa de Honor Cousenier (1): 1920

=== International ===
Argentina

- Copa América (1): 1921
