= 1909 Copa Jockey Club final =

1909 Copa de Competencia Jockey Club Final
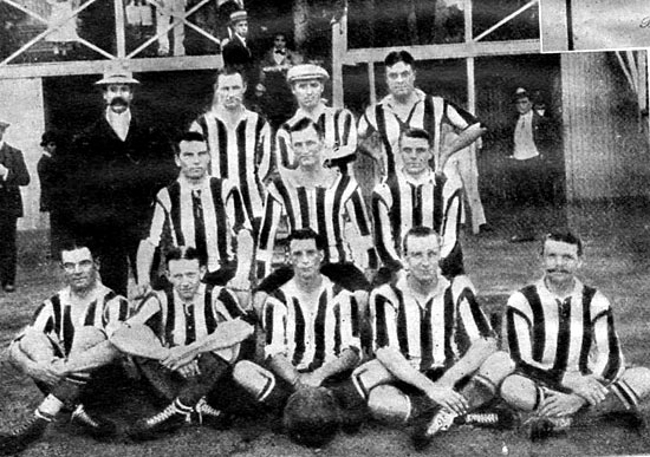
- An Alumni team of 1909
- Event: 1909 Copa de Competencia
Alumni	Newell's Old Boys
5	1
- Date: 1909
- Venue: Banco de la Nación Field, Buenos Aires

The 1909 Copa de Competencia Jockey Club final was the football match that decided the champion of the 3rd. edition of this National cup of Argentina. In the match, played at the Banco de la Nación Field in Colegiales, Buenos Aires on 22 August 1909, Alumni defeated Newell's Old Boys 5–1. to win their third consecutive Copa de Competencia trophy.

This would be the last Copa de Competencia won by the legendary team before the club was dissolved in 1911.

== Qualified teams ==
Team	Previous final app.
Alumni	**1907, 1908**
Newell's Old Boys	(none)

Note

- **Bold** indicates winning years

== Overview ==
The 1909 edition was contested by 14 clubs, 9 within Buenos Aires Province and 5 from Liga Rosarina de Football. Alumni reached the final after beating Provincial 4–0 at the Banco de la Nación Field in Colegiales (where Alumni played all their home matches that year)., Rosario Central 3–1 in the same venue, and San Isidro 3–2 in the homonymous district in Greater Buenos Aires.

On the other hand, Newell's Old Boys eliminated Belgrano A.C. (3–3, 5–2 in playoff) and advancing to quarterfinal where the Rosarino squad eliminated River Plate after three matches as visitor (0–0, 2–2, and 5–2 in second playoff), to finally defeating Estudiantes (BA) 2–1 to reach the final.

This edition of the competition also registered the largest score in any tournament organised by AFA, when Estudiantes (BA) defeated Lomas Athletic 18–0 in Palermo on May 25. Forward Maximiliano Susan scored 12 goals (7 of them consecutively), a record that remains nowadays. The catastrophic defeat also caused Lomas A.C. disaffiliated from the Association at the end of the 1909 season (where the team finished last, being relegated), The club not only disaffiliated but quit association football forever.

== Road to the final ==
- H: home
- A: away
- N: neutral

Alumni		Round	Newell's Old Boys	
Opponent	Result	Group stage	Opponent	Result
Provincial	4–0 (H)	Round of 8	Belgrano A.C.	3–3, 5–2 (H)
Rosario Central	3–1 (H)	Quarterfinal	River Plate	0–0, 2–2, 5–2 (A)
San Isidro	3–2 (A)	Semifinal	Estudiantes (BA)	2–1 (A)

== Match details ==
1909 Copa Competencia Final
22 August 1909

Alumni	5–1	Newell's Old Boys

Banco de la Nación Field, Buenos Aires

**Alumni**
**Newell's**
