= 1921 Copa Jockey Club final =

1921 Copa de Competencia Jockey Club Final
- Event: 1921 Copa de Competencia
Sportivo Barracas	Nueva Chicago
2	1
- Date: 3 December 1922
- Venue: C.A. Del Plata Stadium, Buenos Aires

The 1921 Copa de Competencia Jockey Club final was the football match that decided the champion of the 14th. edition of this National cup of Argentina. In the match, played at the C.A. Del Plata Stadium in Buenos Aires on 3 December 1922, Sportivo Barracas defeated Nueva Chicago 2–1 to win their first Copa de Competencia trophy.

== Qualified teams ==
Team	Previous final app.
Sportivo Barracas	(none)
Nueva Chicago	(none)

Note

- **Bold** indicates winning years

== Overview ==
The 1921 edition was contested by 32 clubs, all of them within Buenos Aires Province. Sportivo Barracas started their run on the Cup defeating Compañía General (club founded by workers of the homonymous French railway company in 1918) 3–1, then beating El Aeroplano 2–1, C.A. Central Argentino (based in San Martín Partido and founded by workers of the Central Argentine Railway) (Note: Not related with current "Club Social Central Argentino" (established in 1930) also based in San Martín Partido. Nevertheless, it could be a successor of that club.) 4–0 (H); in semifinals, Sp. Barracas defeated Progresista 1–0 to earn their place in the final.

On the other hand, Nueva Chicago defeated Estudiantes de La Plata 5–0, Sportivo Palermo 3–0, and Argentinos Juniors 1–0, qualifying to the semifinal where they beat Huracán 2–1, earning their right to play the final.

== Road to the final ==
- H: home
- A: away
- N: neutral

Sportivo Barracas		Round	Nueva Chicago	
Opponent	Result	Group stage	Opponent	Result
Compañía General	3–1 (H)	First round	Estudiantes (LP)	5–0 (H)
El Aeroplano	2–1 (H)	Second round	Sp. Palermo	3–0 (H)
Central Argentino	4–0 (H)	Quarterfinal	Argentinos Juniors	1–0 (H)
Progresista	1–0 (A)	Semifinal	Huracán	2–1 (A)

== Match details ==
1921 Copa Competencia Final
3 December 1922

Sportivo Barracas	2–1	Nueva Chicago

C.A. Del Plata Stadium, Buenos Aires

**Sportivo Barracas**
**Nueva Chicago**
