= 1917 Copa Jockey Club Final =

1917 Copa de Competencia Jockey Club Final
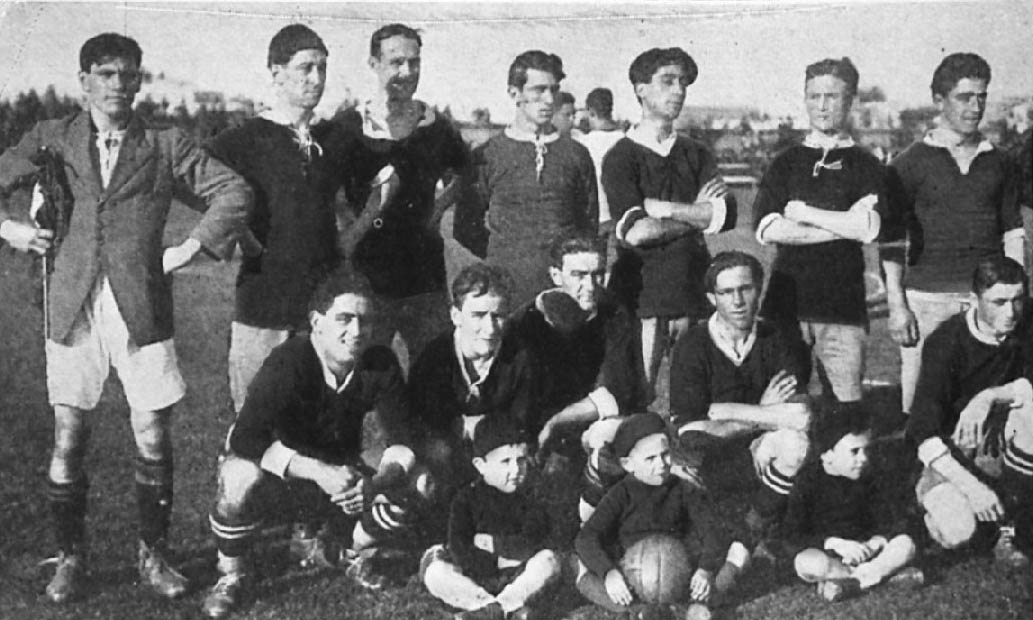
- An Independiente team of 1917
- Event: Copa de Competencia Jockey Club
Independiente	Estudiantes (LP)
2	1
- (after extra time)
- Date: 13 Jan 1918
- Venue: Estadio GEBA

The 1917 Copa de Competencia Jockey Club final was the football match that decided the champion of the 11° edition of this National cup of Argentina. In the match, held in Estadio GEBA on 13 January 1918, Independiente defeated Estudiantes (LP) 2–1 in extra time, winning their first Copa de Competencia trophy.

== Qualified teams ==
Team	Previous final app.
Independiente	1916
Estudiantes (LP)	(none)

Note

- **Bold** indicates winning years

=== Overview ===
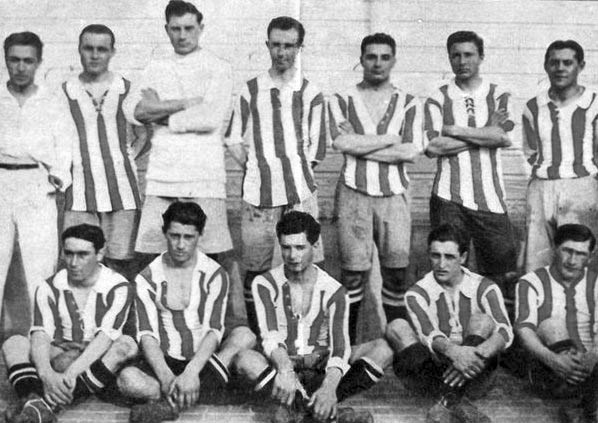
An Estudiantes LP team of 1917

The 1917 edition was contested by 23 clubs, with 21 within Buenos Aires Province and two from Liga Rosarina de Football (that advanced directly to semifinals) participating in the competition. Independiente reached the final after eliminating Racing (1–0 in second playoff after two draws), Ferro Carril Oeste (3–1), Columbian (2–1), San Lorenzo (2–0), and Rosario Central (6–2 in semifinal).

On the other side, Estudiantes de La Plata earned their right to play the final after eliminating San Isidro (2–1), Boca Juniors (1–0 in playoff), and Huracán (1–0), and Central Córdoba de Rosario (2–1).

The final was held in Gimnasia y Esgrima Stadium in Palermo, Buenos Aires, on 13 January 1918. After the match ended 1–1, Juan Cánepa scored for Independiente on extra time to win the match and give Independiente their first Copa de Competencia trophy.

== Road to the final ==
- H: home
- A: away
- N: neutral

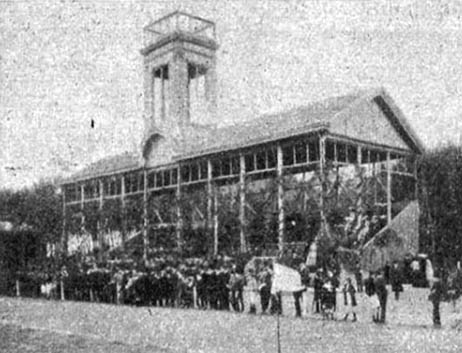
Estadio GEBA, venue

Independiente		Round	Estudiantes (LP)	
Opponent	Result	Group stage	Opponent	Result
Racing	1–1, 0–0, 1–0 (A)	Round of 32	– (Note: Estudiantes began their participation at round of 16.)	
Ferro Carril Oeste	3–1 (a.e.t.) (A)	Round of 16	San Isidro	2–1 (a.e.t.) (A)
Columbian	2–1 (A)	Round of 8	Boca Juniors	0–0 (H), 1–0 (N) (Note: Played in Palermo (Estudiantes BA venue?).)
San Lorenzo	2–0 (H)	Quarter final	Huracán	1–0 (a.e.t.) (A)
Rosario Central	6–2 (N) (Note: Played at Boca Juniors stadium.)	Semifinal	Central Córdoba (R)	2–1 (a.e.t.) (A)

== Match details ==
1917 Copa Jockey Club Final
13 January 1918

Independiente	2–1 (a.e.t.)	Estudiantes (LP)
Ronzoni; Cánepa	Report	?

Estadio GEBA, Buenos Aires

Independiente	Estudiantes (LP)

GK	(Argentina) Secundino Miguens
DF	(Argentina) Antonio Ferro
DF	(Argentina) Roberto Sande
MF	(Argentina) Juan Cánepa
MF	(Argentina) Ernesto Sande
MF	(Argentina) Adolfo Saccarello
FW	(Argentina) Pascual Garré
FW	(Argentina) Guillermo Ronzoni
FW	(Argentina) Juan Siciliani
FW	(Argentina) Dionisio Etcheverry
FW	(Argentina) Gualberto Galeano

GK
DF
DF
MF
MF
MF
FW
FW
FW
FW
FW
