= 1925 Copa Jockey Club final =

1925 Copa de Competencia Jockey Club final
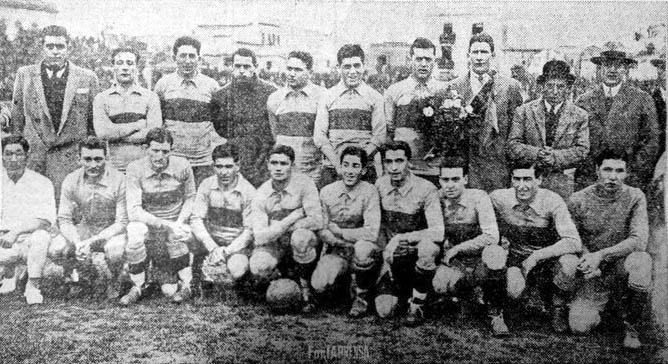
- A Boca Juniors team of 1925
- Event: Copa de Competencia Jockey Club
Boca Juniors	Argentinos Juniors
1	1
- Date: April 18, 1926; 100 years ago
- Venue: Boca Juniors Stadium
- Referee: Pérez

Playoff
- Event: Copa de Competencia Jockey Club
Boca Juniors	Argentinos Juniors
1	0
- Date: April 25, 1926; 100 years ago
- Venue: Boca Juniors Stadium
- Referee: Celleri

The 1925 Copa de Competencia Jockey Club was the final that decided the champion of the 15° edition of this National cup of Argentina. In the match, held in Boca Juniors stadium (on Brandsen and Del Crucero) on April 25, 1926, Boca Juniors defeated Argentinos Juniors 1–0 in playoff, after the original match had ended 1–1.

== Qualified teams ==
Team	Previous final app.
Boca Juniors	**1919**
Argentinos Juniors	(none)

Note

- **Bold** indicates winning years

== Overview ==
The 1925 edition was contested by 23 clubs, all within Buenos Aires Province with no teams from Liga Rosarina de Football participating in the competition. Boca Juniors reached the final after eliminating Porteño (1–0), Alvear (8–0), Nueva Chicago (2–0), and El Porvenir (3–1 in semifinal).

On the other side, Argentinos Juniors earned its right to play the final after eliminating Argentino de Banfield (2–0), Huracán (4–2), and Temperley (1–1, 1–0 in playoff).

The final was held in Boca Juniors stadium on Brandsen and Del Crucero (where La Bombonera is nowadays) on April 18, 1926. Forward héctor Rivas scored the first goal for Argentinos Juniors, but 5 minutes later, on 70', Domingo Tarasconi tied the match, which ended 1–1. With no extra time played, a playoff match was scheduled for April 25 at the same venue. Boca Juniors won with goal by Alfredo Garasini on 7 minutes, crowning champion.

== Road to the final ==
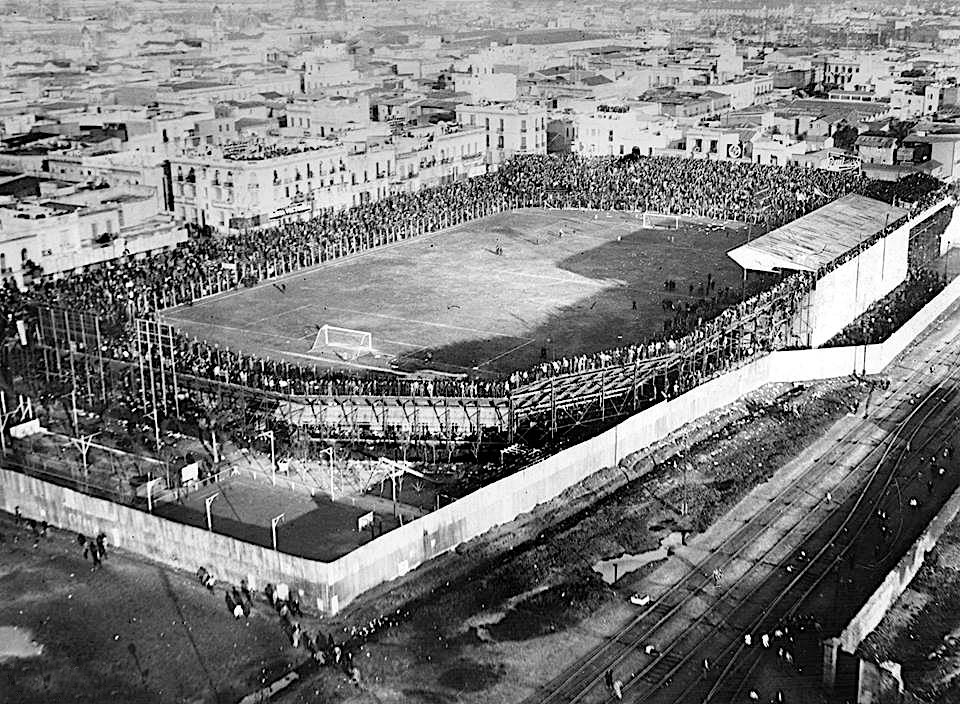
Boca Juniors stadium (Brandsen y Del Crucero), venue

Boca Juniors		Round	Argentinos Juniors	
Opponent	Result	Group stage	Opponent	Result
Porteño	1–0 (H)	Round of 16	–	
Alvear	8–0 (H)	Round of 8	Argentino de Banfield	2–0 (A)
Nueva Chicago	2–0 (H)	Quarter final	Huracán	4–2 (H)
El Porvenir	3–1 (N) (Note: Played at Estadio Sportivo Barracas.)	Semifinal	Temperley	1–1, 1–0 (H)

== Match details ==
=== Final ===
1925 Copa Jockey Club Final
18 April 1926
Final

Boca Juniors	1–1	Argentinos Juniors
Tarasconi 70'	Report	Rivas 65'

Boca Juniors Stadium, Buenos Aires
Referee: Pérez

**Boca Juniors**	**Argentinos Juniors**

GK	(Argentina) Manuel Merello
DF	(Argentina) Ludovico Bidoglio
DF	(Argentina) Ramón Muttis
MF	(Argentina) Ángel Médici
MF	(Argentina) Mario Fortunato
MF	(Argentina) Alfredo Elli
FW	(Argentina) Domingo Tarasconi
FW	(Argentina) Antonio Cerrotti
FW	(Argentina) Ángel Tazza
FW	(Argentina) Alfredo Garasini
FW	(Argentina) Roberto Dighero

GK	Alffredo López
DF	Pascual Di Paola
DF	José Giachetti
MF	Emilio Méndez
MF	Luis Vaccaro
MF	Blas Lobianco
FW	Francisco Solano
FW	Luis Vecchia
FW	Atilio Bernasconi
FW	Juan Meraldi
FW	Héctor Rivas

=== Playoff ===
25 April 1926
Playoff

Boca Juniors	1–0	Argentinos Juniors
Garasini 7'	Report

Boca Juniors Stadium, Buenos Aires
Referee: Celleri

**Boca Juniors**	**Argentinos Juniors**

GK	(Argentina) Manuel Merello
DF	(Argentina) Ludovico Bidoglio
DF	(Argentina) Ramón Muttis
MF	(Argentina) Ángel Médici
MF	(Argentina) Mario Fortunato
MF	(Argentina) Alfredo Elli
FW	(Argentina) Armando Bergamini
FW	(Argentina) Domingo Tarasconi
FW	(Argentina) Ángel Tassa
FW	(Argentina) Alfredo Garasini
FW	(Argentina) Roberto Dighero

GK	Alffredo López
DF	Pascual Di Paola
DF	Carlos Arana
MF	Emilio Méndez
MF	Luis Vaccaro
MF	Blas Lobianco
FW	Luis Vecchia
FW	José O. Gatti
FW	Atilio Bernasconi
FW	Juan Meraldi
FW	Francisco Solano
