= Club Progresista =

Argentine sports club

Progresista
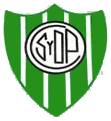
- Full name: Club Progresista
- Nickname: Progre
- Founded: 1902; 124 years ago
- Ground: Arenales y Sgto. Cabral, Gerli
- Chairman: Ubaldo Peloni
- League: Primera División
- 1926: 17° (relegated)
Home colours

Club Progresista (formerly "Club Social y Deportivo Progresista") is an Argentine sports club based in the Piñeyro district of Avellaneda Partido, Greater Buenos Aires. The club has been regarded for its football squad that played in Primera División during the 1920s.

Apart from football, sports now played at Progresista are Basque pelota, swimming and taekwondo.

== History ==
During its first years of existence, Progresista had a strong rivalry with El Porvenir, a neighbor club from Gerli.

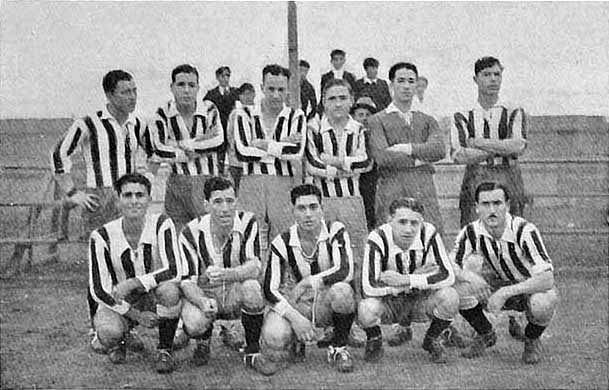
The team that won its only AFA title, the 1935 Tercera División championship

The football squad debuted in the 1922 season playing the official AFA championship after the association split into two bodies in 1919. Progresista played at the top level of Argentina until 1926 when AFA and dissident AAmF merged. Therefore Progresista was relegated to Segunda División along with Alvear, Argentino de Banfield, Boca Alumni, Del Plata, General San Martín, Palermo, Sportivo Balcarce, Sportivo Dock Sud, Sportsman and Universal.

After that, Progresista participated in the lower divisions of Argentine football, winning the 1935 Tercera División championship. Three years later, the club disaffiliated from the Association.

== Notable players ==
Antonio Sastre, one of the most notable players in the history of Club Atlético Independiente and inducted member into the AFA Hall of Fame, began his career playing at Progresista. Sastre was a skilled playmaker that could play in several positions on the field. He played a total of 340 matches with Independiente, scoring 112 goals and winning the 1938 and 1939 league titles, sharing duties with Vicente de la Mata, Arsenio Erico and José Zorrilla.

The only Progresista players to have played for the Argentina national team were Juan Carlos Lalaurette and Juan Bianchi. They were part of the squad in the South American championships of 1923 and 1925 respectively.

== Honours ==
- Tercera División (1): 1935
