= 1933 Copa Jockey Club final =

1933 Copa de Competencia Jockey Club final
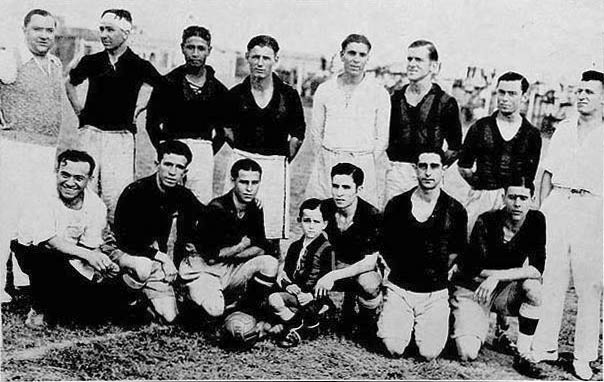
- Nueva Chicago, champions
- Event: 1933 Copa de Competencia
Nueva Chicago	Banfield
1	0
- Date: 24 December 1933
- Venue: Club Almagro Stadium, Buenos Aires

The 1933 Copa de Competencia Jockey Club was the final that decided the champion of the 17th (and last) edition of the National cup of Argentina. The final was held in Club Almagro stadium in the Parque Chas neighborhood of Buenos Aires, (Note: After Club Almagro was evicted from the land that the club rented in Parque Centenario, it got another land in Parque Chas. The field (with a capacity for 20,000) was located on Gándara, Londres, Avda. Benjamín Victorica, and Ginebra streets. The club stayed there until 1937, when they moved to Villa Urquiza.) on 24 December 1933.

Nueva Chicago defeated Banfield 1–0 winning its first and only title in the top division of Argentine football.

== Qualified teams ==
Team	Previous final app.
Nueva Chicago	(none)
Banfield	(none)

Note

- **Bold** indicates winning years

== Overview ==
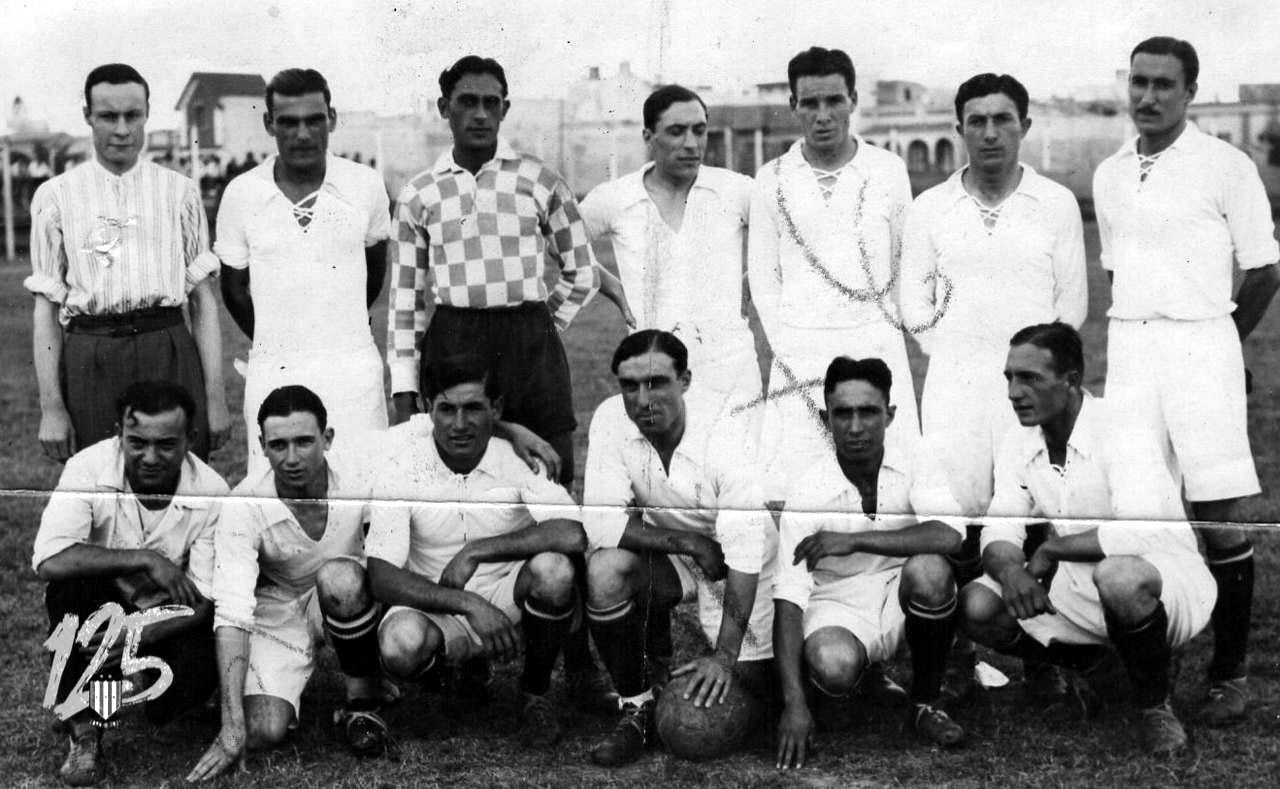
Banfield (in white shirt), losing team

This edition was contested by 20 clubs from Primera División (first division). Teams were grouped in three zones, two of 7 teams and the rest of 6. Teams played each other in a single-robin tournament. Winners of each zone qualified to play the second stage (semifinals).

Nueva Chicago, in group C, played v Estudiantes (BA) (1–0), Sportivo Barracas (3–0), Estudiantil Porteño (2–2), All Boys (0–0), Sportivo Buenos Aires (2–1), and Barracas Central (won points after Barracas withdrew). Nueva Chicago finished first in the group with 10 points, directly qualifying to the semifinals although the team did not play.

On the other hand, Banfield, in group B, played vs Argentino de Quilmes (3–1), Argentino de Temperley (02), El Porvenir (1–0), Sportivo Alsina (4–2), and Sp. Dock Sud (3–1). As Banfield and Dock Sud finished equaled on points, a playoff was held to define which team would advance to semifinals. Banfield defeated Dock Sud 3–0.

== Road to the final ==
Nueva Chicago		Round	Banfield	
Opponent	Result	Group stage	Opponent	Result
Estudiantes (BA)	1–0 (A)	Matchday 1	Argentino (Quilmes)	3–1 (H)
Sportivo Barracas	3–0 (H)	Matchday 2	Argentino (Temperley)	0–2 (A)
Estudiantil Porteño	2–2 (A)	Matchday 3	El Porvenir	1–0 (H)
All Boys	0–0 (H)	Matchday 4	Sp. Alsina	4–2 (A)
Sp. Buenos Aires	2–1 (A)	Matchday 5	Sp. Dock Sud	3–1 (A); 3–0 (N) (Note: Playoff to determine the first position (and qualification to the second stage) of the group zone.)
Barracas Central	wp–lp (H)	Matchday 6	–	
– (Note: Advanced directly to the final.)		Semifinal	Defensores de Belgrano	2–1 (N)

== Match details ==
1933 Copa de Competencia Jockey Club final
24 December 1933

Nueva Chicago	1–0	Banfield
Vargas 39'	Report

Almagro Stadium, Buenos Aires

**Nueva Chicago**	**Banfield**

GK	(Argentina) Adolfo Scali
DF	(Argentina) Emeterio Palacio
DF	(Argentina) Juan Diani
MF	(Argentina) José Mercado
MF	(Argentina) Alfredo Vivanco
MF	(Argentina) Argentino Fernández
FW	(Argentina) Tomás Berlanga
FW	(Argentina) José Noguera
FW	(Argentina) Florentino Vargas
FW	(Argentina) José M. Galeano
FW	(Argentina) Isidoro Sanabria

GK	(Argentina) M. Pergolesi
DF	(Argentina) F. Paola
DF	(Argentina) O. Echeverría
MF	(Argentina) M. Alló
MF	(Argentina) E. Canessa
MF	(Argentina) A. Durán
FW	(Argentina) D. Barba
FW	(Argentina) G. Zorrilla
FW	(Argentina) J. Gatti
FW	(Argentina) A. Natale
FW	(Argentina) R. Castro Huergo
