= 1915 Copa Jockey Club final =

1915 Copa de Competencia Jockey Club Final
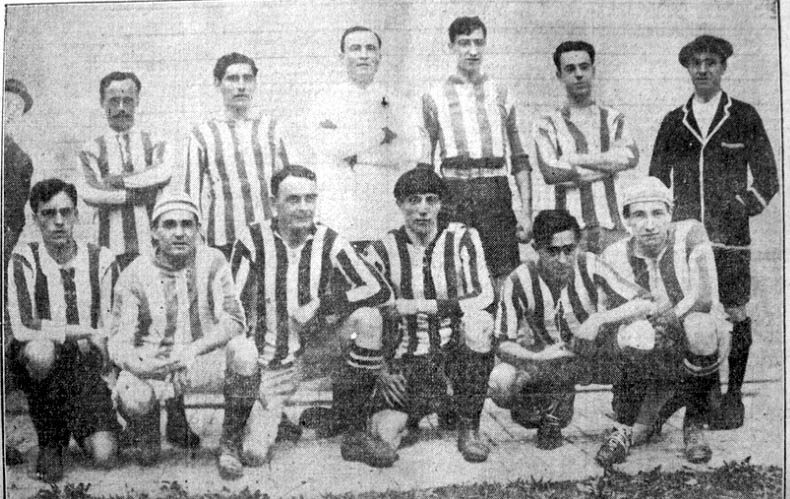
- C.A. Porteño, champions
- Event: 1915 Copa de Competencia
Porteño	Racing
2	1
- Date: 24 October 1915
- Venue: C.A. Porteño Field, Buenos Aires

The 1915 Copa de Competencia Jockey Club final was the football match that decided the champion of the 9th. edition of this National cup of Argentina. In the match, played at the Porteño Stadium in Palermo on 24 October 1915, Porteño defeated Racing 2–1 to win their first Copa de Competencia trophy.

== Qualified teams ==
Team	Previous final app.
Porteño	(none)
Racing	1913

Note

- **Bold** indicates winning years

== Overview ==
The 1915 edition was contested by 33 clubs, 25 within Buenos Aires Province and 8 from Liga Rosarina de Football. Porteño started in the group of 32, where they eliminated Hispano Argentino 2–1, then beating Tigre 6–1 (at C.A. Atlanta Stadium). In the round of 8, they defeated Huracán 5–2 in extra time. In quarter and semifinal, Porteño finally eliminated River Plate and Rosario A.C. respectively, to earn their place in the final.

On the other hand, Racing started their participation defeating San Isidro 1–0, then eliminating Estudiantes de Buenos Aires 2–0 in Palermo. In the group of 8, Racing defeated Estudiantes de La Plata 2–0 in playoff (after a 0–0 draw). The following rivals were Ferro Carril Oeste and Gimnasia y Esgrima de Rosario whom Racing defeated 3–1 and 2–1 respectively to reach the final.

== Road to the final ==
- H: home
- A: away
- N: neutral

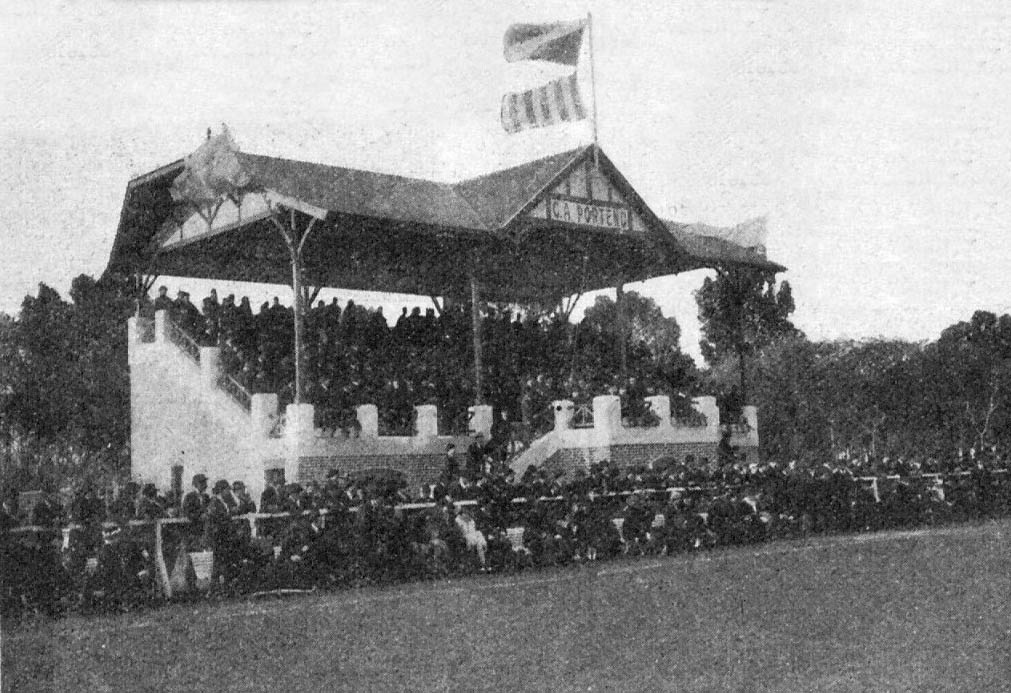
C.A. Porteño Field in Palermo hosted the match

Porteño		Round	Racing	
Opponent	Result	Group stage	Opponent	Result
Hispano Argentino	2–1 (A)	First round	San Isidro	1–0 (H)
Tigre	6–1 (N) (Note: Played at C.A. Atlanta Stadium.)	Second round	Estudiantes (BA)	2–0 (A)
Huracán	5–2 (a.e.t.) (H)	Round of 8	Estudiantes (LP)	0–0 (a.e.t.), 2–0 (H)
River Plate	2–1 (A)	Quarterfinal	Ferro Carril Oeste	3–1 (H)
Rosario A.C.	1–0 (H)	Semifinal	Gimnasia y Esgrima (R)	2–1 (A)

== Match details ==
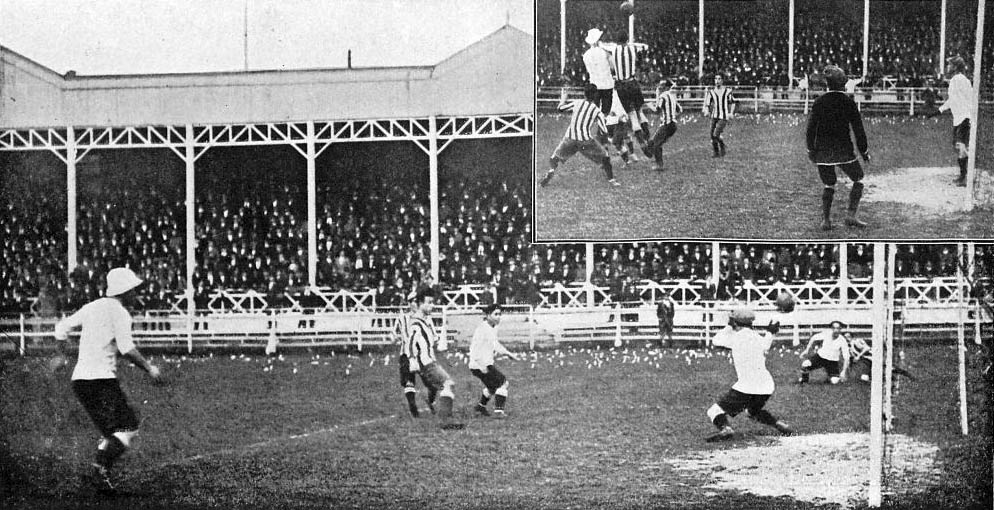
A moment of the match: Porteño goalkeeper Juan Rithner saving his goal

1915 Copa Competencia Final
24 October 1915

Porteño	2–1	Racing

C.A. Porteño Field, Buenos Aires

**Porteño**
**Racing**
