= 1913 Copa Jockey Club final =

1913 Copa de Competencia Jockey Club Final
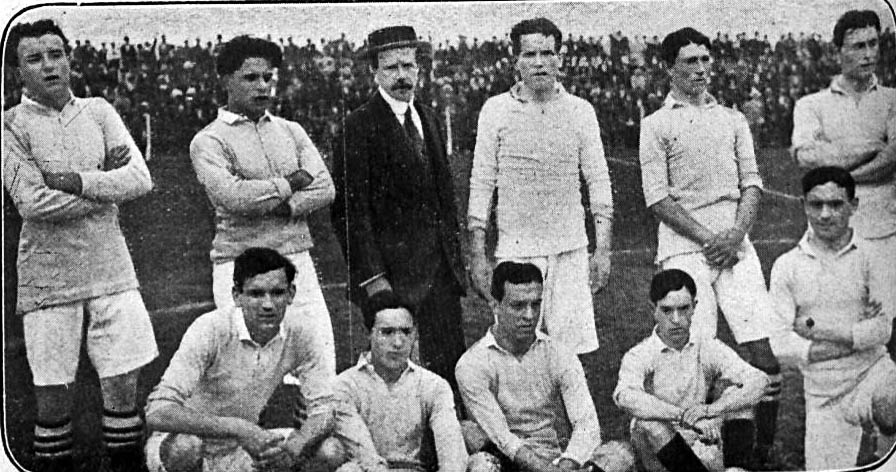
- A San Isidro team of 1913
- Event: 1913 Copa Jockey Club
Racing	San Isidro
0	2
- Date: 12 October 1913
- Venue: Racing Club
- Referee: Armando Bergalli

The 1913 Copa de Competencia Jockey Club was the final that decided the champion of the 7th. edition of this National cup of Argentina. In the match, held in Racing Club Stadium in Avellaneda on 12 October, 1913, San Isidro defeated Racing 2–0, winning their third consecutive title.

Racing Club would take revenge two months later when they won the 1913 Argentine Primera División Final v San Isidro so both teams had finished the championship equaled on points.

== Qualified teams ==
Team	Previous finals app.
Racing	(none)
San Isidro	**1911, 1912**

Bold indicates winning years

== Overview ==
The 1913 edition had a preliminary phase contested by 32 clubs, 28 within Buenos Aires Province and 4 from Santa Fe Province. Racing Club thrashed Unión de Santa Fe 8–0, qualifying to the first stage (contested by 12 clubs). There, Racing beat Belgrano AC 1–0, Estudiantes BA 1–0, and Estudiantil Porteño in the semifinals at Ferro Carril Oeste (3–1). | On the other hand, San Isidro beat Newell's Old Boys in preliminary round (4–2), then eliminating Boca Juniors (2–1), and Banfield 4–1 in semifinals.

== Road to the final ==
- H: home
- A: away
- N: neutral

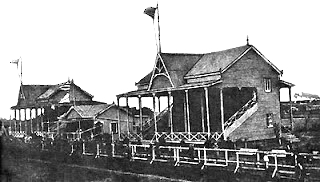
Racing Club, venue for the final

Racing		Round	San Isidro	
Opponent	Result	Group stage	Opponent	Result
Unión (SF)	8–0 (H)	Preliminary	–	–
Belgrano A.C.	1–0 (H)	Round of 8	Newell's Old Boys	4–2 (A)
Estudiantes (BA)	3–1 (A)	Quarterfinal	Boca Juniors	2–1 (H)
Estudiantil Porteño	3–1 (H)	Semifinal	Banfield	4–1 (H)

== Match details ==
1913 Copa de Competencia Jockey Club Final
12 October 1913
Final

Racing	0–2	San Isidro
	Report	Meira 42'; Pocock 58'

Racing Club, Avellaneda
Referee: Armando Bergalli

**Racing**
**San Isidro**

GK	(Argentina) Carlos Muttoni
DF	(Argentina) Armando Reyes
DF	(Argentina) Saturnino Ochoa
MF	(Argentina) Ricardo Pepe
MF	(Argentina) Juan Ohaco
MF	(Argentina) Francisco Olazar
FW	(Argentina) Raúl López
FW	(Argentina) Alberto Ohaco (c)
FW	(Argentina) Alberto Marcovecchio
FW	(Argentina) Juan Hospital
FW	(Argentina) Juan Perinetti

GK	Carlos T. Wilson
DF	Juan Iriarte
DF	Juan J. Bello
MF	Juan Goodfellow
MF	Carlos Janon
MF	Alberto Olivieri
FW	Elías Fernández
FW	Juan Rossi (c)
FW	S. Pocock
FW	Roberto L. Hulme
FW	Alfredo Meira
