= 1908 Copa Jockey Club final =

1908 Copa de Competencia Jockey Club Final
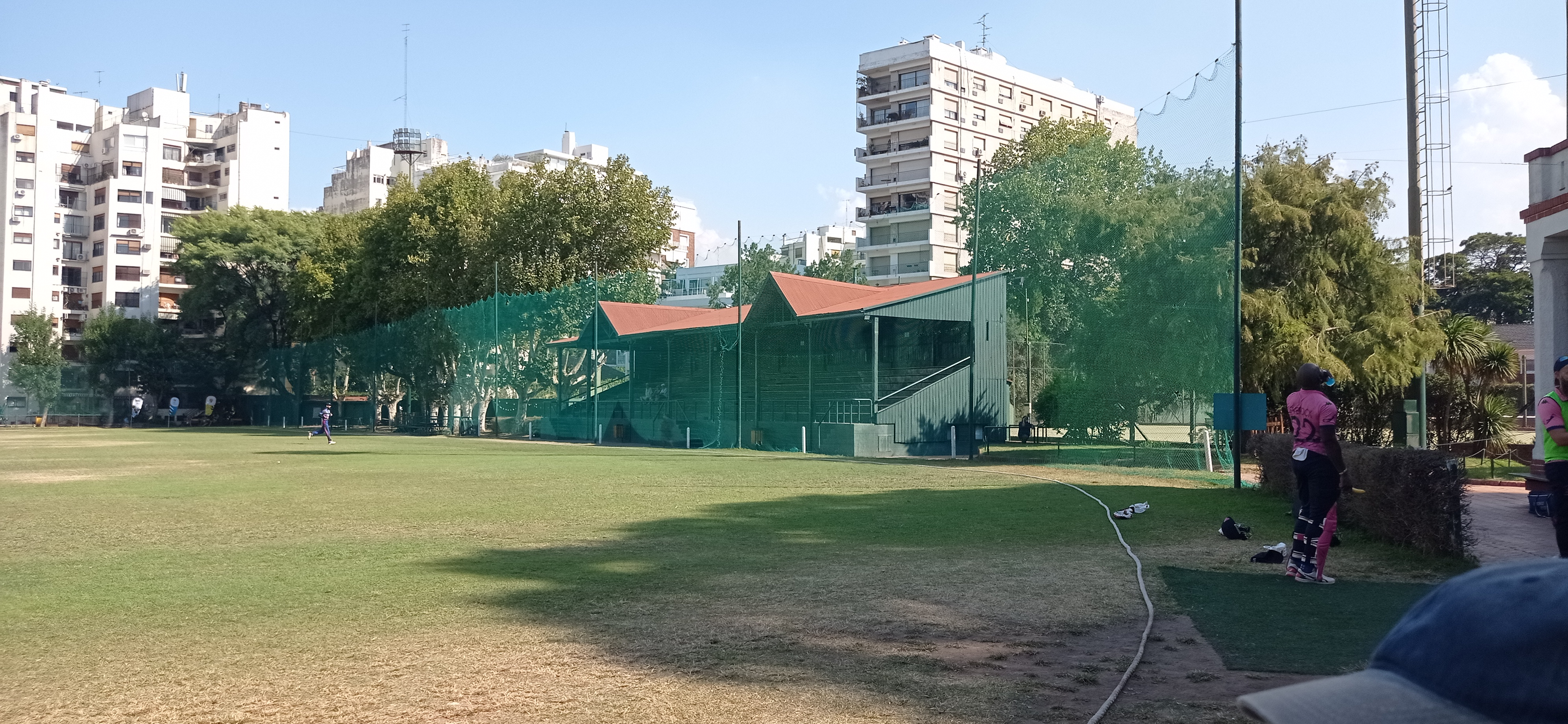
- The Belgrano A.C. Field (here pictured in 2023) was the venue for the match
- Event: 1907 Copa de Competencia
Alumni	Argentino (Q)
5	0
- Date: 2 August 1908
- Venue: Belgrano A.C. Field, Buenos Aires

The 1908 Copa de Competencia Jockey Club final was the football match that decided the champion of the 2nd. edition of this National cup of Argentina. In the match, played at the Virrey del Pino and Superí field in Belgrano, Buenos Aires on 2 August 1908, Alumni defeated Argentino de Quilmes 5–0. to win their second consecutive Copa de Competencia trophy.

== Qualified teams ==
Team	Previous final app.
Alumni	**1907**
Argentino de Quilmes	(none)

Note

- **Bold** indicates winning years

=== Overview ===
The 1907 edition was contested by 14 clubs, 10 within Buenos Aires Province and 4 from Liga Rosarina de Football. Alumni reached the final after beating San Martín A.C. (Note: "San Martín Athletic Club" was based on General San Martín Partido, having been established on 2 Jul 1899. It was affiliated to the AFA between 1901 and 1909. The date of dissolution is unclear.) 3–1 as visitor, Rosario Central 2–0 in Rosario, and Belgrano A.C. 3–0 in semifinal.

On the other hand, Argentino de Quilmes entered directly in quarterfinal, where the team defeated Lomas A.C. and Newell's Old Boys in semifinals. Both matches by the same score (2–1) and as visitor team.

== Road to the final ==
- H: home
- A: away
- N: neutral

Alumni		Round	Argentino de Quilmes	
Opponent	Result	Group stage	Opponent	Result
San Martín A.C.	3–1 (A)	Round of 8	– (Note: Entered directly to quarterfinal.)	–
Rosario Central	2–0 (A) (Note: Held in the C.A. Provincial Field in Rosario.)	Quarterfinal	Lomas A.C.	2–1 (A)
Belgrano A.C.	3–0 (A)	Semifinal	Newell's Old Boys	2–1 (A)

== Match details ==
1908 Copa Competencia Final
2 August 1908

Alumni	5–0	Argentino (Q)

Belgrano A.C. Field, Buenos Aires

**Alumni**
**Argentino (Q)**
