= Sportivo Balcarce =

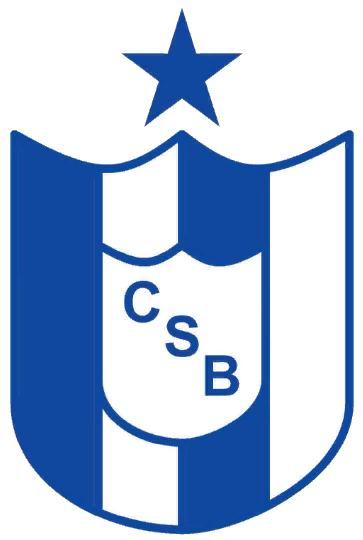
- Full name: Club Sportivo Balcarce
- Founded: 1919; 107 years ago
- Ground: Florida, Buenos Aires; Argentina
- League: Primera B
- 1932: 2nd (not promoted)
Home colours

Club Sportivo Balcarce, or simply "Sportivo Balcarce", is an Argentine sports club located in Florida, Buenos Aires. Although other disciplines are held in the club, football was the most predominant sport while the senior squad was affiliated to the Argentine Football Association in the 1920s and 1930s.

Other sports practised at the club include gymnastics, taekwondo and swimming.

== History ==
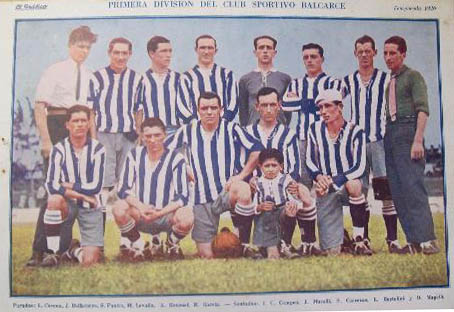
Football squad of 1926

Founded in 1919, the football squad was promoted to the first division of Argentine football league system in 1925, as División Intermedia champion. The club debuted in Primera División in 1926, finishing in the 4th. position. Over 17 matches played, the squad won 10 with 4 games lost. Sportivo Balcarce scored 29 goals and conceded 19.

Despite its good performance in the tournament, Sportivo Balcarce was relegated to the Primera B (second division) when both leagues, official "Asociación Argentina de Football" and dissident "Asociación Amateurs de Football" merged to form a unique league in 1927. The other teams relegated were Alvear, Argentino de Banfield, Boca Alumni, Del Plata, General San Martín, Palermo, Progresista, Dock Sud, Sportsman and Universal.

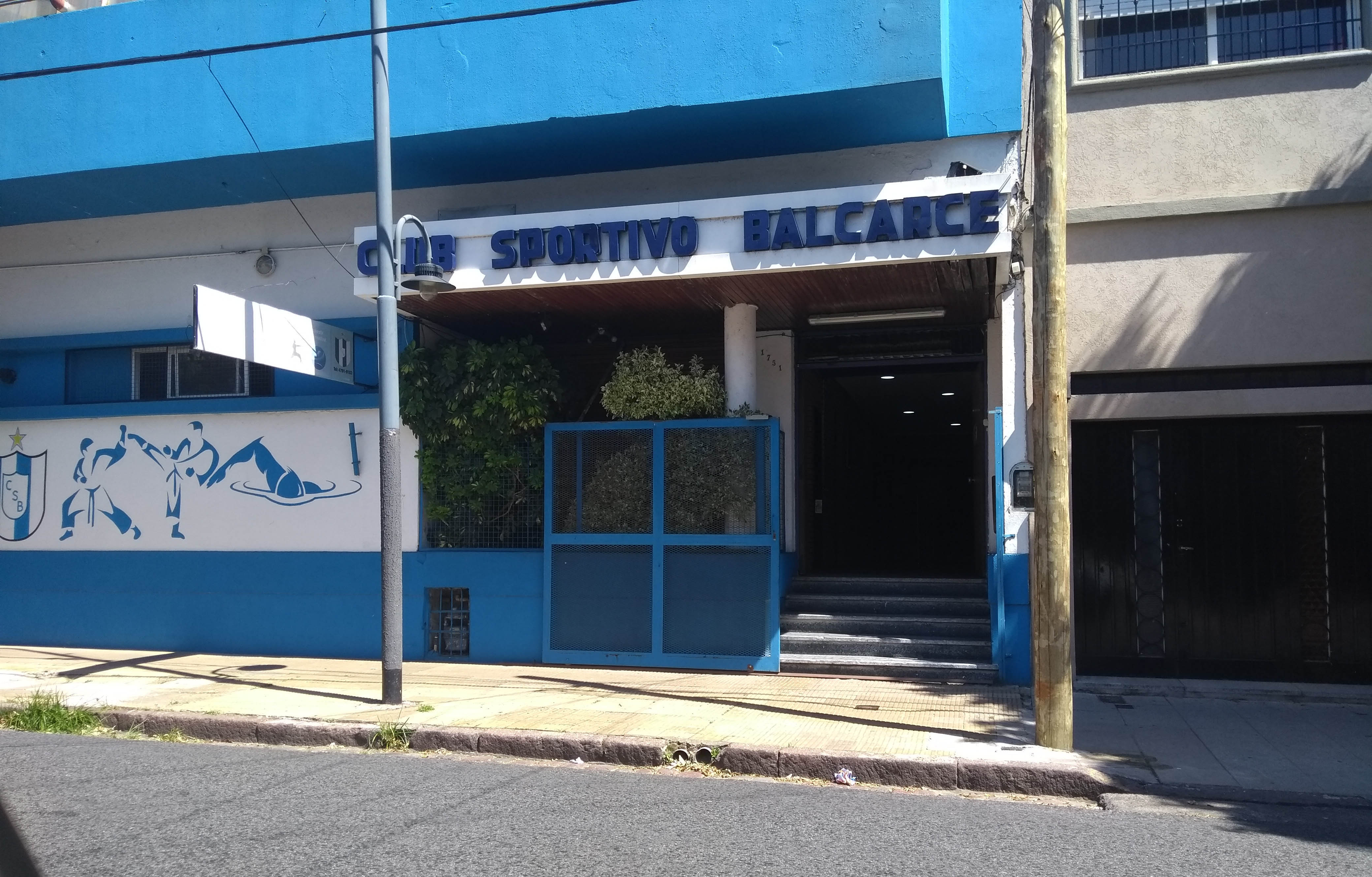
Main entrance to the club headquarters, pictured in December 2020

In the 1927 championship, Sportivo Balcarce finished 10th out of 18 teams. In 1931, Sportivo Balcarce won its only official title, the Copa de Competencia Jockey Club, after beating Defensores de Belgrano by 4–1 in the second leg final.

The team continued competing in the second division, being near to promote to the highest level in 1932 when it finished 2nd. to Dock Sud, which finally won the championship, therefore achieving promotion to the first division. That was the last official tournament played by Sportivo Balcarce, never returning for any competition organized by the Argentine Association.

Nevertheless, the institution continued its activities, focusing on youth and amateur levels. The club has been active to present days.

== Honours ==
=== National ===
==== League ====
- División Intermedia
  - Winners (1): 1925

==== National cups ====
- Copa de Competencia Jockey Club
  - Winners (1): 1931
