= 1933 Argentine Primera División =

42nd season of top-tier football league in Argentina

Primera División
- Season: 1933
- Dates: 12 March – 19 November
- Champions: Sp. Dock Sud (AFA); San Lorenzo (LAF)

The 1933 Primera División was the 42nd season of top-flight football in Argentina. It continued with both associations organising tournaments. The official AFA season did not have relegations at the end of the championship while Sportivo Acassuso made its debut in Primera. On the other hand, the dissident professional league (LAF) organised its 3rd. championship, in which relegation took place for the first time, with 5 teams sent to the second division.

The amateur AFA season was won by Dock Sud, achieving its first title in Primera División, with Alfonso Lorenzo (Barracas Central) being the topscorer with 16 goals.

The professional LAF tournament was won by San Lorenzo de Almagro that obtained its 4° Primera División title. Francisco Varallo of Boca Juniors was the top goalscorer with 34 goals.

== Final tables ==
=== Asociación Argentina de Football (AFA) ===
Primera División (AFA)
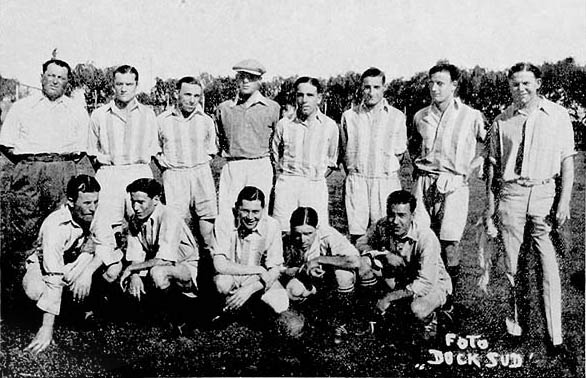
- Sportivo Dock Sud, AFA champions
- Season: 1933
- Dates: 2 April – 5 November
- Champions: Dock Sud (1st title)
- Promoted: Dock Sud; Palermo; Sportivo Alsina; Acassuso
- Relegated: (none)
- Matches played: 306
- Goals scored: 1,075 (3.51 per match)
- Top goalscorer: (Argentina) Alfonso Lorenzo (Barracas Central) (16 goals)
- Biggest home win: N. Chicago 8-1 Estudiantes (BA)
- Biggest away win: Liberal Argentino 0-4 Def. Belgrano

Pos	Team	Pld	W	D	L	GF	GA	GD	Pts	Qualification
1	Dock Sud	19	13	3	3	43	15	+28	29	Champion
2	Nueva Chicago	19	12	4	3	46	21	+25	28	
3	Banfield	19	11	5	3	39	23	+16	27	
4	Defensores de Belgrano	19	11	4	4	33	12	+21	26	
5	Sportivo Alsina	19	9	5	5	32	19	+13	23	
6	Barracas Central	19	9	3	7	36	28	+8	21	
7	All Boys	19	8	5	6	30	31	−1	21	
8	Liberal Argentino	19	8	5	6	27	34	−7	21	
9	Almagro	19	7	6	6	33	34	−1	20	
10	Argentino (T)	19	7	6	6	25	26	−1	20	
11	Acassuso	19	7	5	7	29	28	+1	19	
12	Excursionistas	19	7	5	7	31	32	−1	19	
13	Sportivo Buenos Aires	19	5	7	7	23	22	+1	17	
14	Estudiantil Porteño	19	7	2	10	21	33	−12	16	
15	Colegiales	19	5	4	10	20	32	−12	14	
16	Palermo	19	6	2	11	18	33	−15	14	
17	El Porvenir	19	5	3	11	31	35	−4	13	
18	Argentino (Q)	19	4	4	11	29	46	−17	12	
19	Estudiantes (BA)	19	4	4	11	26	49	−23	12	
20	Sportivo Barracas	19	2	4	13	14	33	−19	8	

=== Liga Argentina de Football ===
Primera División (LAF)
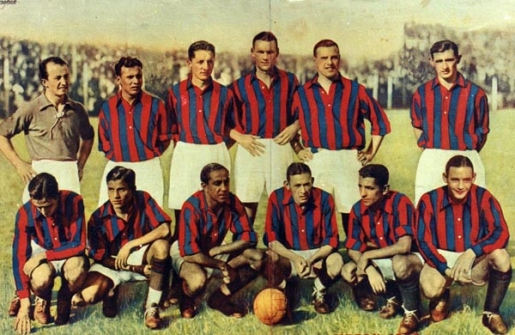
- San Lorenzo, LAF champions
- Season: 1933
- Dates: 12 March – 19 November
- Champions: San Lorenzo (4th title)
- Relegated: Argentinos Juniors; Lanús; Talleres (RE); Atlanta; Tigre
- Top goalscorer: (Argentina) Francisco Varallo (Boca Juniors) (34 goals)
- Biggest home win: N. Chicago 8-1 Estudiantes (BA) (AFA); Racing 7-0 Tigre
- Biggest away win: Tigre 1–6 Boca Juniors

Pos	Team	Pld	W	D	L	GF	GA	GD	Pts	Qualification or relegation
1	San Lorenzo	34	22	6	6	81	48	+33	50	Champion
2	Boca Juniors	34	22	5	7	86	47	+39	49	
3	Racing	34	21	6	7	76	33	+43	48	
4	River Plate	34	20	6	8	71	36	+35	46	
4	Gimnasia y Esgrima (LP)	34	21	4	9	90	55	+35	46	
6	Independiente	34	18	5	11	54	39	+15	41	
7	Vélez Sarsfield	34	15	8	11	60	43	+17	38	
8	Chacarita Juniors	34	14	7	13	55	61	−6	35	
9	Platense	34	11	9	14	61	74	−13	31	
10	Estudiantes (LP)	34	12	6	16	60	65	−5	30	
11	Ferro Carril Oeste	34	9	10	15	43	56	−13	28	
12	Huracán	34	10	7	17	49	60	−11	27	
13	Quilmes	34	8	10	16	41	61	−20	26	
14	Argentinos Juniors	34	8	9	17	45	71	−26	25	Relegated
15	Lanús	34	7	10	17	52	76	−24	24	Relegated
16	Talleres (RE)	34	7	9	18	61	84	−23	23	Relegated
16	Atlanta	34	9	5	20	46	70	−24	23	Relegated
18	Tigre	34	9	4	21	44	96	−52	22	Relegated

=== Top goalscorers ===
Pos	Name	Team	Goals
1	(Argentina) Francisco Varallo	Boca Juniors	34
2	(Argentina) Arturo Naón	Gimnasia y Esgrima (LP)	33
3	(Argentina) Bernabé Ferreyra	River Plate	27

== Notes ==
1. Tigre and Quilmes were relegated by league decision. Talleres (Escalada) and Lanús were merged in Unión Talleres-Lanús. Atlanta and Argentinos Juniors were merged in Atlanta-Argentinos Juniors. The latter two were allowed to stay in the league.
