= Estadio Brandsen y Del Crucero =

Defunct football stadium in Buenos Aires, Argentina

Brandsen y Del Crucero Stadium
- Estadio Brandsen y Del Crucero
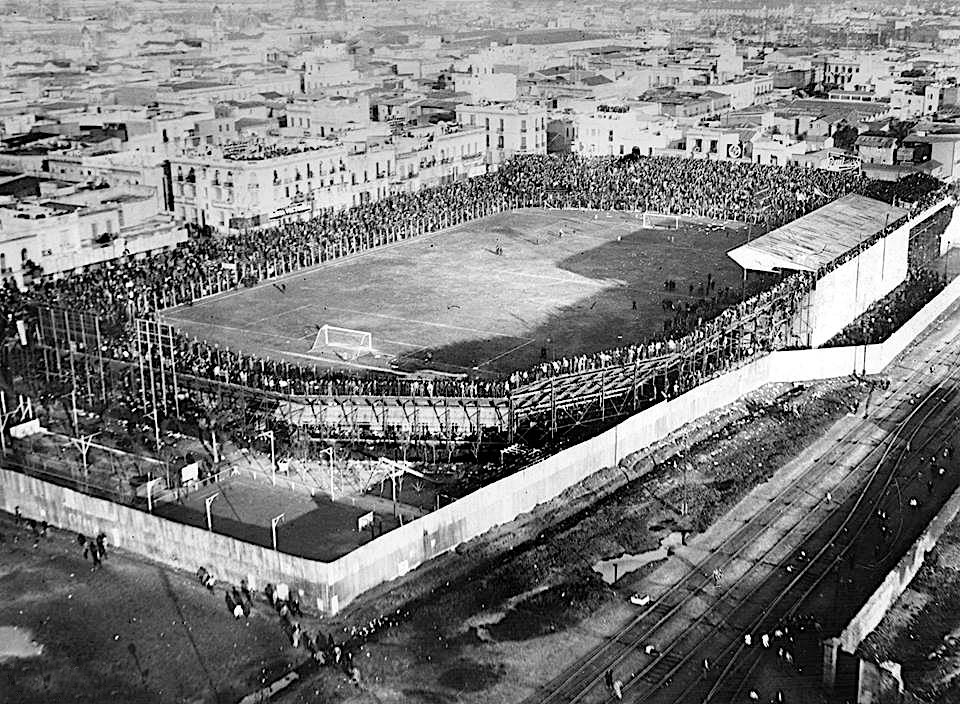
- The stadium in 1925
- Address: Brandsen and Del Crucero; La Boca; Argentina
- Owner: Boca Juniors
- Operator: Boca Juniors
- Seating type: Wood
- Capacity: 25,000
- Type: Stadium
- Surface: Grass
- Field size: 105 x 68 m

Construction
- Built: 1922–24
- Opened: 6 July 1924
- Closed: 1 November 1938
- Rebuilt: 1938–40 (La Bombonera, on the same place)
- Years active: 1924–38

Tenants
- Boca Juniors (1924–38); Argentina national football team (1925–27)

Estadio Boca Juniors, mostly known as Estadio Brandsen y Del Crucero, was an association football stadium in La Boca, Buenos Aires. It was located on the square block formed by Brandsen and Del Crucero (Del Valle Iberlucea nowadays) streets, and the Buenos Aires and Ensenada Port Railway tracks and its station, "Casa Amarilla".

Built after the club had to left its previous venue, Estadio Ministro Brin y Senguel, the stadium has a capacity of 25,000 and was the home ground of club Boca Juniors before it was closed in 1938 and demolished to build a stadium with concrete grandstands ("La Bombonera") on the same location.

The stadium held a total of 25,000 spectators. It was one of two stadiums that hosted the 1925 South American Championship (currently, Copa América), the other being Sportivo Barracas.

== History ==
The previous venues of Boca Juniors had been the field in Dársena Sur, about seven blocks from there, near Puerto Madero district, and Ministro Brin and Senguel stadium, whose owner did not renew the contract of location. Therefore the Boca Juniors executives decided to build an own stadium to host the great number of supporters.

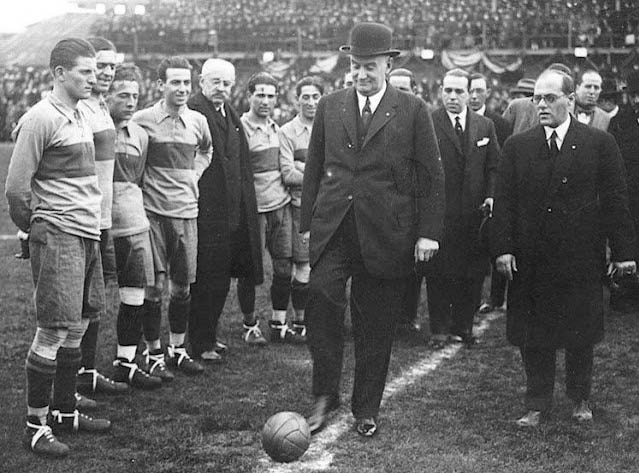
President of Argentina, Marcelo T. de Alvear, the day the stadium was inaugurated, 6 July 1924

Works to build the new stadium started in 1922 and lasted until 1924. The stadium was inaugurated on July 6, 1924, celebrations included a friendly match v Uruguayan club Nacional and President of Argentina, Marcelo T. de Alvear as guest of honor to kick the first ball. Previously, a group of supporters had taken the flag of Boca Juniors from the old field in Dársena Sur, carrying it by foot being escorted by 3,000 members of the club.

The first official match there was on August 3, 1924, when Boca Juniors beat Palermo 5–2. Carmelo Pozzo scored the first official goal there, on 2 minutes. During its first years, the stadium had three grandstands: the official (with roof) on the west, one on the north ("Casa Amarilla") and the third on Del Crucero street. A fourth grandstand would be later built on Brandsen street.

Playing in that stadium, Boca won several titles such as the 1924, 1926, 1930, 1931, 1934, 1935 Primera División, 1924 Copa Ibarguren, 1925 Copa de Competencia Jockey Club (beating Argentinos Juniors after two matches), and 1926 Copa Estímulo.

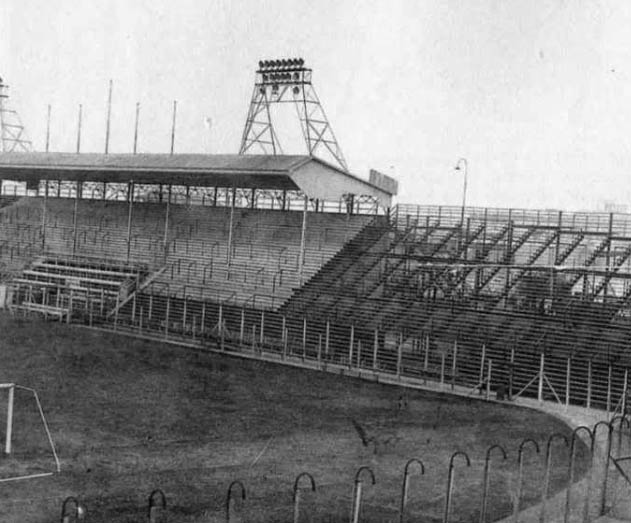
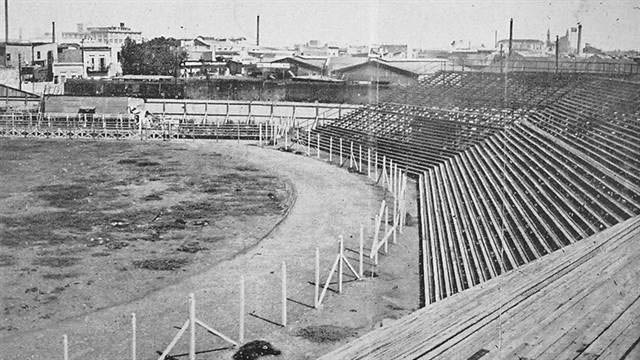
(Above): Lightning towers in 1930. The system had been inaugurated one year before; (below): The wooden grandstand that Boca gave to Ferro C. Oeste in 1938, in exchange for the trade of defender Arcadio López

On July 17, 1927, Boca Juniors played a friendly v Spanish club Real Madrid, losing 2–1. It was the first match won by the Spanish side outside Europe.

When Scottish club Motherwell toured on South America in 1928, they played two matches at Boca Juniors, one vs an Argentine Combined (won by the visitor 3–0) and another v Boca Juniors (lost 2–0). That same year, FC Barcelona also played a friendly there during their South American tour, defeating Boca Juniors 2–1 on August 18.

In 1929, a lighting system was inaugurated. Lights were mounted over four metallic towers. On 24 December 1929, the first match with the lights was played, a friendly v Newell's Old Boys, which Boca won 5–2.

First projects to build a stadium with concrete grandstands came in 1933. On April 10, 1938, the last match held in the stadium was played with Boca Juniors losing to River Plate 2–1. After that, the old wooden grandstands were dismantled. The grandstand on Casa Amarilla street was traded to Club Ferro Carril Oeste which placed it in its own stadium, on Martín de Gainza street. In return for that, Ferro traded Boca Juniors halfback Arcadio López and allowed Boca Juniors to use its stadium until the new venue was finished. This agreement entered into force since the 1938 season.

Preceded by Parque Central; Montevideo	Campeonato Sudamericano; Venue; 1925	Succeeded by Campos Sports de Ñuñoa; Santiago
