= 1912 Copa Jockey Club final =

1912 Copa de Competencia Jockey Club Final
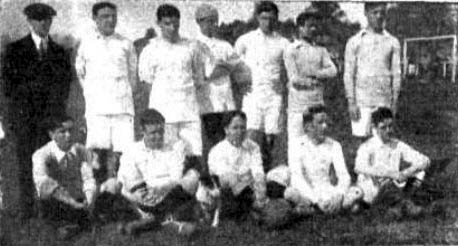
- A San Isidro team of 1912
- Event: 1912 Copa de Competencia
San Isidro	Quilmes
0	0
- (after extra time)
- Date: 1912
- Venue: Estadio del CASI, San Isidro

1912 Copa de Competencia Jockey Club Playoff
- Event: 1912 Copa de Competencia
Quilmes	San Isidro
1	2
- Date: 27 October 1912
- Venue: Quilmes Stadium, Quilmes

The 1912 Copa de Competencia Jockey Club final was the football match that decided the champion of the 5th. edition of this National cup of Argentina. In the match, played in the city of San Isidro, C.A. San Isidro and Quilmes tied 0–0 after extra time.

The playoff was scheduled for 27 October 1912 at the Quilmes A.C. Stadium in the homonymous city, where San Isidro defeated Quilmes 2–1, to win their second consecutive Copa de Competencia trophy.

It was the first Copa Jockey Club final defined in a playoff match.

== Qualified teams ==
Team	Previous final app.
San Isidro	**1911**
Quilmes	(none)

Note

- **Bold** indicates winning years

== Overview ==
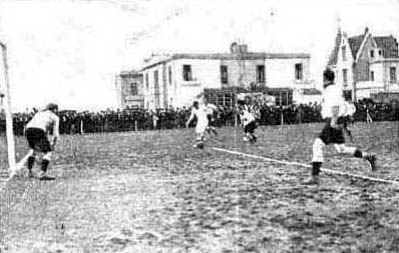
Semifinal: Quilmes v Tiro Federal at Belgrano A.C.

The 1912 edition was contested by 14 clubs, 9 within Buenos Aires Province and 5 from Liga Rosarina de Football.

San Isidro eliminated Argentino de Rosario 4–1 (after extra time) as visitor, then beating Estudiantes de La Plata 5–0 in quarterfinal. Then the squad entered directly to the final.

On the other hand, Quilmes entered directly to the quarterfinal, where the team defeated Belgrano A.C. 2–1 in Belgrano, then eliminating Tiro Federal 5–1 at home in semifinal.

== Road to the final ==
- H: home
- A: away
- N: neutral

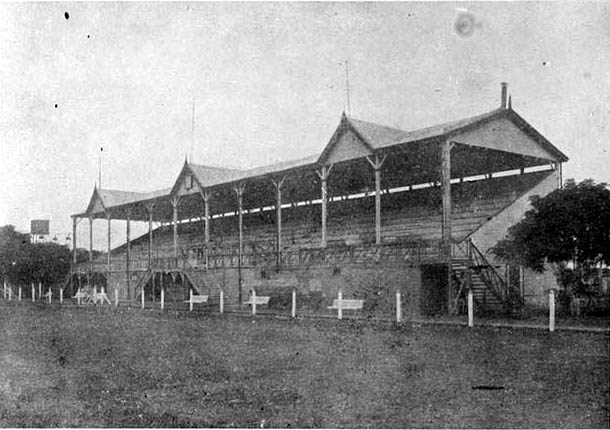
San Isidro Stadium, venue for the final. The playoff was held in Quilmes

San Isidro		Round	Quilmes	
Opponent	Result	Group stage	Opponent	Result
Argentino (R)	4–1 (A)	Round of 8	–	–
Estudiantes (LP)	5–0 (A)	Quarterfinal	Belgrano A.C.	2–1 (A)
–	–	Semifinal	Tiro Federal	5–1 (H)

== Match details ==
1912 Copa Competencia Final
? 1912
Final

San Isidro	0–0 (a.e.t.)	Quilmes

C.A. San Isidro Field, San Isidro

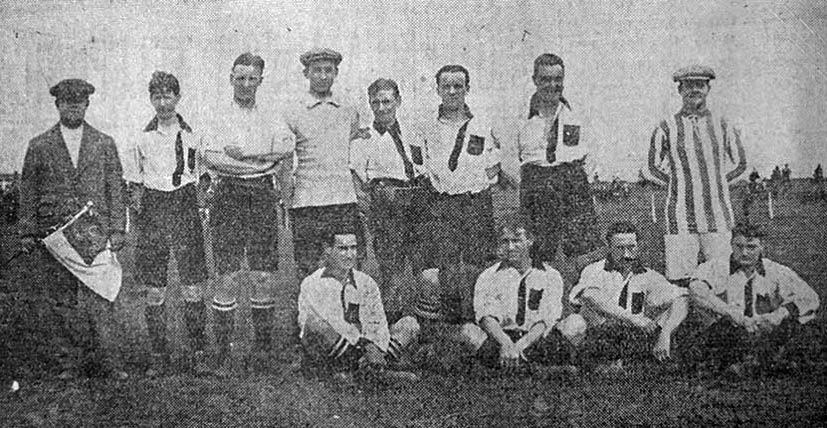
The Quilmes team that played the decisive match

27 October 1912
Playoff

Quilmes	1–2	San Isidro

Quilmes Stadium, Quilmes

**Quilmes**
**San Isidro**

Note: San Isidro won 2–0 on points
