= 1916 Copa Jockey Club final =

1916 Copa de Competencia Jockey Club Final
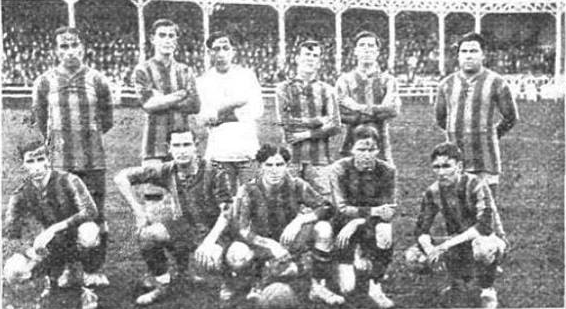
- A Rosario Central team of 1916
- Event: 1916 Copa Jockey Club
| Independiente | Rosario Central |
| 1 | 2 |
- Date: December 17, 1916
- Venue: Racing Club, Avellaneda
- Referee: Emilio Rolón

The 1916 Copa de Competencia Jockey Club Final was the football match that decided the champion of the 10th. edition of this National cup of Argentina. In the match, held in Racing Club Stadium in Avellaneda on December 17, 1916, Rosario Central defeated Club Atlético Independiente 2–1.

== Qualified teams ==
| Team | Previous finals app. |
|---|---|
| Rosario Central | (none) |
| Independiente | (none) |

Bold indicates winning years

== Overview ==
The 1916 edition was contested by 24 clubs, 22 within Buenos Aires Province and 2 from Liga Rosarina de Football (Rosario Central and Central Córdoba) that qualified in the Rosario´s zone. Rosario Central defeated Belgrano and Gimnasia y Esgrima (both from Rosario's zone) to reach the semifinals of the cup. In that stage, they beat River Plate (1–1, 3–2 in playoff)

On the other hand, Independiente, starting in group of 16, beat Belgrano A.C. 3–0, Estudiantes de La Plata 3–2, and Columbian (1–1, 3–2 in playoff), to defeat then Central Córdoba in the semifinal.

== Road to the final ==
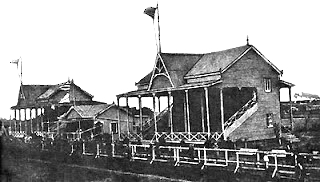
Racing Club Stadium, venue

| Independiente | | Round | Rosario Central | |
|---|---|---|---|---|
| Opponent | Result | Group stage | Opponent | Result |
| Belgrano A.C. | 3–0 (H) | Round of 16 | – (Note: Central qualified directly to the round of 8, reasons unclear.) | |
| Estudiantes LP | 3–2 (H) | Round of 8 | Belgrano de Rosario | 2–0 (V) |
| Columbian | 1–1 (a.e.t.), 3–2 (a.e.t.) (H) | Quarter final | Gimnasia y Esgrima de Rosario | 3–0 (V) |
| Central Córdoba (R) | 2–1 (H) | Semifinal | River Plate | 1–1, 3–2 (H) |

== Match details ==
1916 Copa de Competencia Jockey Club Final
December 17, 1916
Final

| Independiente | 1–2 | Rosario Central |
|---|---|---|
| Dannaher 70' | Report | Blanco 30'; H. Hayes 72' |

Racing Club, Avellaneda
Referee: Emilio Rolón

| **Independiente** | **Rosario Central** |

| GK | (Argentina) Secundino Miguens |
| DF | (Argentina) Atilio Brameri |
| DF | (Argentina) Roberto Sande |
| MF | (Argentina) Juan Cánepa |
| MF | (Argentina) Ernesto Sande |
| MF | (Argentina) José Ventureira |
| FW | (Argentina) Alberto Cherro |
| FW | (Argentina) Aníbal Arroyuelo |
| FW | (Argentina) Antonio Ferro |
| FW | (Argentina) Ernesto Strittmatter |
| FW | (Argentina) Gualberto Galeano |

| GK | (Argentina) Serapio Acosta |
| DF | (Argentina) Zenón Díaz |
| DF | (Argentina) Ignacio Rotta |
| MF | (Argentina) Jacinto Perazzo |
| MF | (Argentina) Eduardo Blanco |
| MF | (Argentina) Ernesto Rigotti |
| FW | (Argentina) Francisco Furlong |
| FW | (Argentina) Antonio Blanco |
| FW | (Argentina) Ennis Hayes |
| FW | (Argentina) José Laiolo |
| FW | (Argentina) Juan Enrique Hayes |
