= 1931 Copa Jockey Club final =

1931 Copa de Competencia Jockey Club final
- Event: 1931 Copa de Competencia
Sportivo Balcarce	Almagro
1	1
- Date: February 28, 1932; 93 years ago
- Venue: All Boys, Buenos Aires

Playoff
Sportivo Balcarce	Almagro
4	1
- Date: March 6, 1932; 93 years ago
- Venue: Excursionistas, Buenos Aires
- Man of the Match: J. González (Sp. Balcarce)

The 1931 Copa de Competencia Jockey Club was the final that decided the champion of the 16th edition of the National cup of Argentina. The final was held in All Boys stadium in Monte Castro, on 28 February 1932. As the match ended 1–1, a playoff was held at the stadium of Club Atlético Excursionistas in Belgrano, on March 3, 1932.

Sportivo Balcarce beat Almagro 4–1 and won its first and only title in the top division of Argentine football.

== Qualified teams ==
Team	Previous final app.
Sportivo Balcarce	(none)
Almagro	(none)

Note

- **Bold** indicates winning years

== Overview ==
This edition was contested by 40 clubs from Primera División (first division) and Primera B (second division) plus one team, "Ferrocarriles del Estado" not belonging any of those divisions. Teams were grouped in six zones, North 1, North 2, South 1, South 2, South 3 and West.

Sportivo Balcarce (in "North 2" group), played against General San Martín (3–0), Excursionistas, Porteño (unknown score in both cases), lost to Sportivo Palermo (0–4), and drew with Alvear de Caseros (3–3), and Ferrocarriles del Estado (1–1) in 7 rounds, qualifying for the second stage. In quarter finals, Balcarce beat Defensores de Belgrano (3–0) and then defeated Argentino de Quilmes in semifinals (unknown score). On the other side, Almagro (in "West" group) beat All Boys (3–1), Liberal Argentino (3–0), La Paternal (1–0), Estudiantil Porteño (3–0), drew with Palermo (1–1), and lost to Estudiantes (BA) (0–2), finishing first of the group with 13 points. In semifinals, Almagro beat Barracas Central in playoff 3–0 after the match had ended 1–1.

== Road to the final ==
Sportivo Balcarce		Round	Almagro	
Opponent	Result	Group stage	Opponent	Result
Alvear (Caseros)	3–3 (N)	Matchday 1	All Boys	3–1 (N)
Sportivo Palermo	0–4 (N)	Matchday 2	Palermo	1–1 (N)
Porteño	(not played)	Matchday 3	Liberal Argentino	3–0 (N)
Ferrocarriles del Estado	1–1 (N)	Matchday 4	La Paternal	1–0 (N)
General San Martín	3–0 (N)	Matchday 5	Estudiantes (BA)	2–0 (N)
Excursionistas	wp–lp (Note: Won points after Excursionistas did not attend the match.)	Matchday 6	Estudiantil Porteño	3–0 (N)
–		Matchday 7	Nueva Chicago	wp–lp (Note: Won points after N. Chicago did not attend the match.)
Defensores de Belgrano	3–0 (N)	Quarter final	– (Note: Almagro qualified directly to the semifinal, unclear reasons.)	
Argentino de Quilmes	wp–lp (Note: Won points after Argentino de Quilmes did not attend the match.)	Semifinal	Barracas Central	2–2 (a.e.t.), 1–1 (a.e.t.), 3–0 (N)

== Match details ==
=== Final ===
28 February 1932

Sportivo Balcarce	1–1	Almagro
?	Report	?

All Boys Stadium, Buenos Aires
Referee: Galli

Suspended at 80' for foul play from both teams

=== Playoff ===
6 March 1932

Sportivo Balcarce	4–1	Almagro
Aguirre 3', 72'; Galarza 30'; Olivera 71'	Report	Recanattini 53' (pen.)

Excursionistas Stadium, Buenos Aires

**Sp. Balcarce**	**Almagro**

GK	(Argentina) J. M. González
DF	(Argentina) C. Maranga
DF	(Argentina) D. Rimazza
MF	(Argentina) A. Maranga
MF	(Argentina) J. Morelli
MF	(Argentina) C. Numa
FW	(Argentina) G. Galarza
FW	(Argentina) P. Numa
FW	(Argentina) J. Olivera
FW	(Argentina) O. Aguirre
FW	(Argentina) C. Della Barga

GK	(Argentina) Cándido De Nicola		(substituted off) 60'
DF	(Argentina) Mateo Fernández
DF	(Argentina) Humberto Recanattini		(substituted off) 60' (Note: Recanattini retired from the field so his teammate Héctor Oro could replace De Nicola as goalkeeper)
MF	(Argentina) Vicente Sola
MF	(Argentina) José Acetto
MF	(Argentina) A. Guglietti
FW	(Argentina) Héctor Oro (Note: When De Nicola injured on 60', he played as goalkeeper)
FW	(Argentina) Vicente Pérez
FW	(Argentina) José Ciancio
FW	(Argentina) Agustín Olivetto
FW	(Argentina) Oscar Correa	Sent off (straight red)

Players of Almagro left the field on 72'.
