= 1919 Copa Jockey Club final =

1919 Copa de Competencia Jockey Club Final
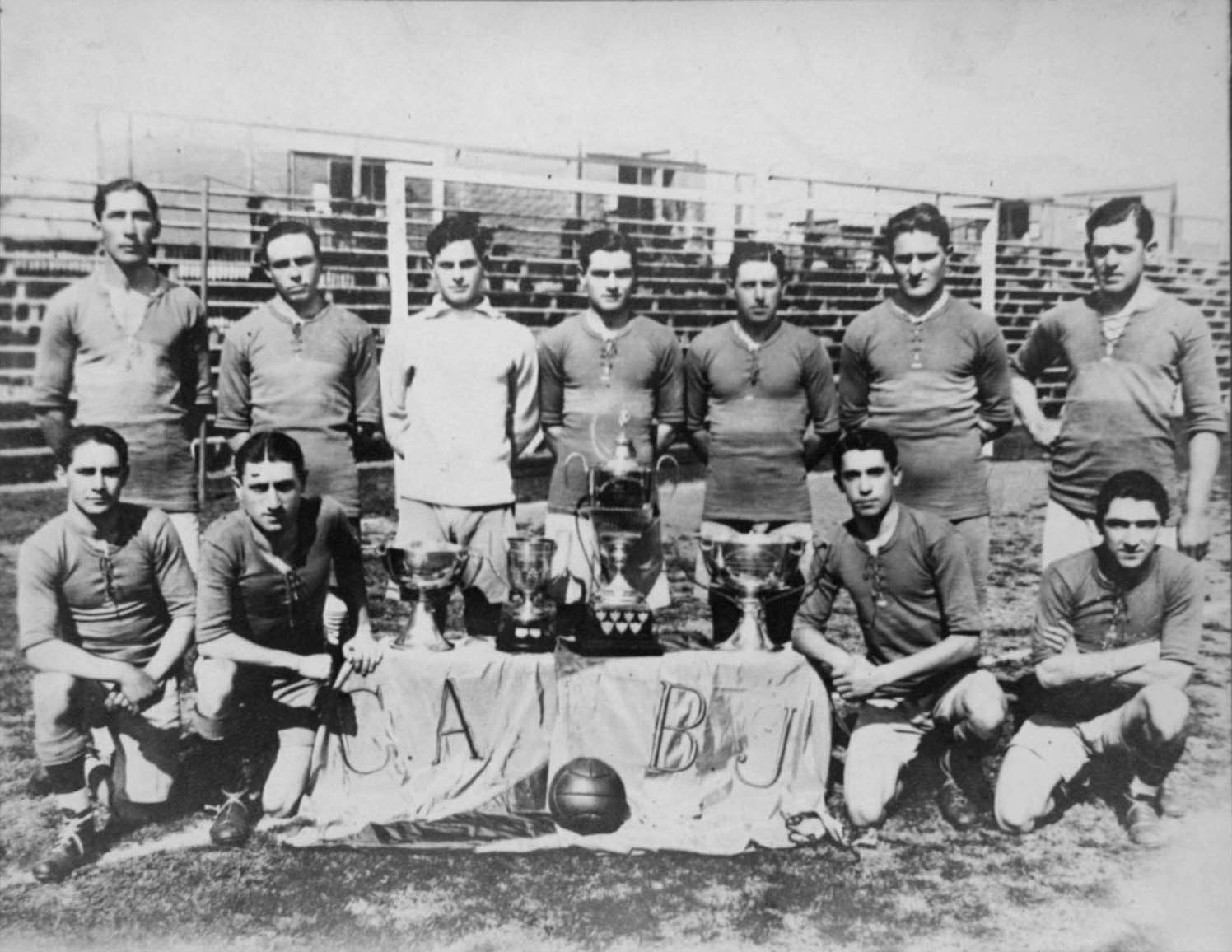
- Boca Juniors team with all the trophies won in 1919
- Event: 1919 Copa de Competencia
Boca Juniors	Rosario Central
1	0
- Date: February 8, 1920; 105 years ago
- Venue: Gimnasia y Esgrima (BA)
- Referee: Gardi

The 1919 Copa de Competencia Jockey Club was the final that decided the champion of the 13° edition of this National cup of Argentina. In the match, held in Gimnasia y Esgrima de Buenos Aires on January 18, 1920, Boca Juniors defeated Rosario Central 1–0 after extra time.

== Qualified teams ==
Team	Previous final app.
Boca Juniors	(none)
Rosario Central	1916

Note

- **Bold** indicates winning years

== Overview ==
The 1919 edition was contested by 48 clubs, 46 within Buenos Aires Province and 2 from Liga Rosarina de Football (Rosario Central and Belgrano) that entered directly to the semifinals. Boca Juniors reached the final after playing Gimnasia y Esgrima LP, Eureka, Racing, eliminating Estudiantes LP (3–0), Porteño (3–2 in quarterfinal), Belgrano de Rosario (2–0 in semifinal)

On the other side, Rosario Central earned its right to play the final after thrashing Eureka 7–0. The only goal of the match was scored by winger Pedro Calomino by penalty kick on 103'. One minute earlier, Américo Tesoriere had stopped a penalty from Blanco.

== Road to the final ==
Keys

- Original tournament, then abandoned after several participating teams disaffiliated from AFA.
- Tournament re-started, with dissafiliated clubs replaced.

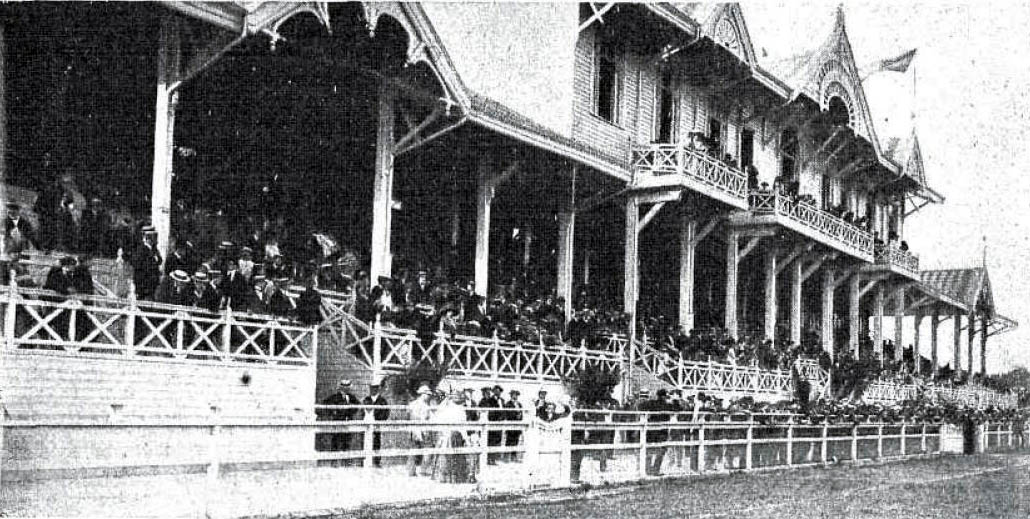
Estadio GEBA, venue

Boca Juniors		Round	Rosario Central	
Opponent	Result	Group stage	Opponent	Result
Gimnasia y Esgrima LP	2–0 (A)	Round of 32	– (Note: Rosario Central entered directly to semifinals.)	
Eureka	1–2 (wp–lp) (A) (Note: Played at Eureka field on Carrasco 250, Floresta, Buenos Aires.) (Note: Although Boca Juniors lost 2–1, the Association awarded points to Boca Juniors due to administrative irregularities from A.A. Eureka.)	Round of 16	–	
Racing Club	0–2 (H) (Note: Boca Juniors eliminated.)	Round of 8	–	
Estudiantes (LP) (Note: Boca had been eliminated from the competition, but returned due as replacement of disaffiliated clubs.)	3–0 (N) (Note: Played at Estadio GEBA.)	Round of 8 (Note: Tournament re-started by the AFA after some clubs left the association.)	–	
Porteño	3–2 (N)	Quarter final	–	
Belgrano (R)	2–0 (N)	Semifinal	Eureka	7–0 (H)

== Match details ==
1919 Copa Jockey Club Final
18 January 1920

Boca Juniors	1–0 (a.e.t.)	Rosario Central
Calomino 103' (pen.)	Report

Gimnasia y Esgrima (BA), Buenos Aires
Referee: Gardi

**Boca Juniors**	**Rosario Central**

GK	(Argentina) Américo Tesoriere
DF	(Argentina) Antonio Cortella
DF	(Argentina) José Ortega
MF	(Argentina) José A. López
MF	(Argentina) Mario Busso
MF	(Argentina) Alfredo Elli
FW	(Argentina) Pedro Calomino
FW	(Argentina) Pablo Bosso
FW	(Argentina) Alfredo Garasini
FW	(Argentina) Alberto Martín
FW	(Argentina) Pedro Miranda

GK	(Argentina) Octavio Díaz
DF	(Argentina) Patricio Clarke
DF	(Argentina) Florencio Sarasíbar
MF	(Argentina) Rodolfo Mulhall
MF	(Argentina) Patricio Furlong
MF	(Argentina) Jacinto Perazzo
FW	(Argentina) Ernesto Guaraglia
FW	(Argentina) Antonio Blanco
FW	(Argentina) Harry Hayes
FW	(Argentina) Ennis Hayes
FW	(Argentina) Antonio Miguel
