= 1910 Copa Jockey Club final =

1910 Copa de Competencia Jockey Club Final
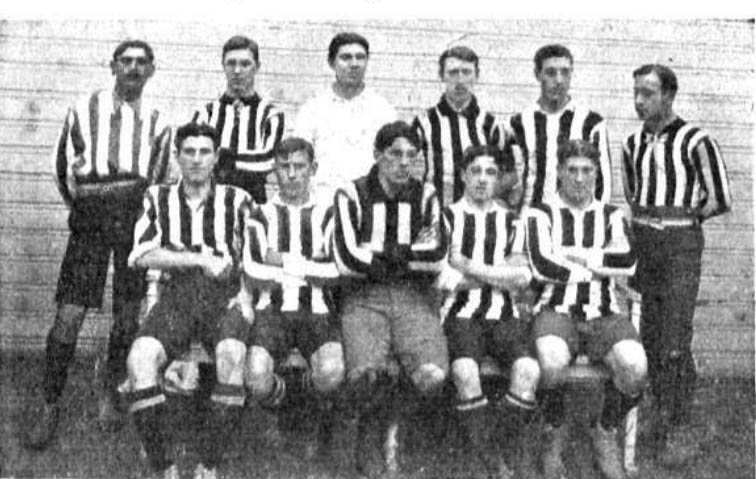
- An Estudiantes team of 1910
- Event: 1910 Copa de Competencia
Estudiantes	Gimnasia y Esgrima
3	1
- Date: 1910
- Venue: Palermo (Note: As there were several fields in the barrio of Palermo by those times, it is unclear if the match was held in Gimnasia y Esgrima ("Sede Maldonado"), Estudiantes BA (Av. del Libertador y Oro), Porteño (Av. del Libertador y Godoy Cruz), or Sociedad Sportiva (Av. del Libertador y Dorrego).), Buenos Aires

The 1910 Copa de Competencia Jockey Club final was the football match that decided the champion of the 4th. edition of this National cup of Argentina. In the match, played in Palermo, Buenos Aires, Estudiantes (BA) defeated Gimnasia y Esgrima de Buenos Aires 3–1. to win their first Copa de Competencia trophy.

== Qualified teams ==
Team	Previous final app.
Estudiantes (BA)	(none)
Gimnasia y Esgrima (BA)	(none)

Note

- **Bold** indicates winning years

== Overview ==
The 1910 edition was contested by 14 clubs, 9 within Buenos Aires Province and 5 from Liga Rosarina de Football. Estudiantes entered directly in quarterfinal, where the squad defeated Argentino de Rosario 1–0, then eliminating Newell's Old Boys (4–3 in playoff after a 4–4 draw), allowing them to play the final.

On the other hand, Gimnasia y Esgrima eliminated River Plate after beating them 3–0, then eliminating Quilmes at home, and finally defeating Provincial in Rosario to earn a place in the final. The three games were won by the same score: 3–0.

== Road to the final ==
- H: home
- A: away
- N: neutral

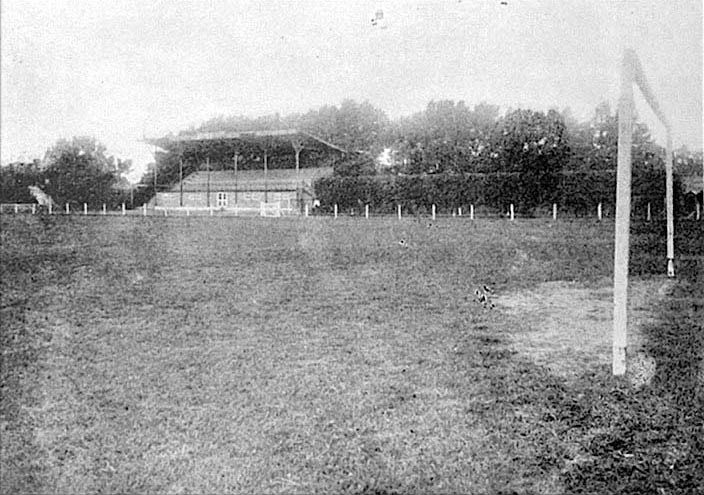
Estudiantes BA field in Palermo, where the match was probably held

Estudiantes (BA)		Round	Gimnasia y Esgrima (BA)	
Opponent	Result	Group stage	Opponent	Result
–	–	Round of 8	River Plate	3–0 (A)
Argentino (R)	1–0 (H)	Quarterfinal	Quilmes	3–0 (H)
Newell's Old Boys	4–4 (a.e.t.), 4–3 (a.e.t.) (H)	Semifinal	Provincial	3–0 (A)

== Match details ==
1910 Copa Competencia Final
? 1910

Estudiantes (BA)	3–1	Gimnasia y Esgrima (BA)

Palermo, Buenos Aires

**Estudiantes (BA)**
**Gimnasia y Esgrima (BA)**
