= 1911 Copa Jockey Club final =

1911 Copa de Competencia Jockey Club Final
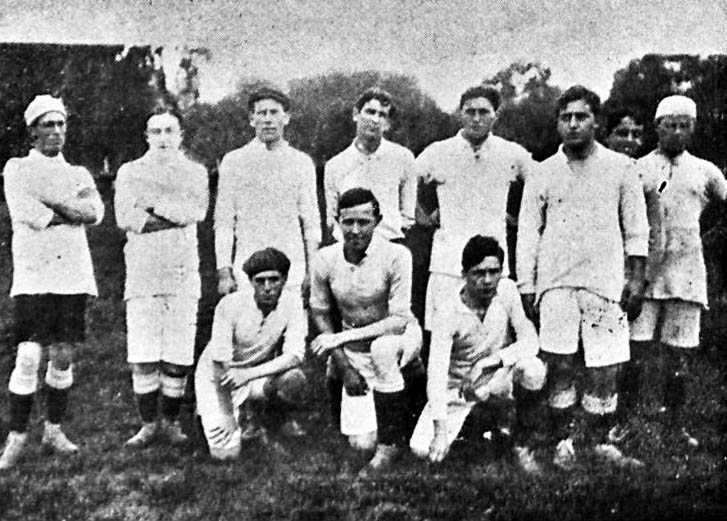
- A San Isidro team of 1911
- Event: 1911 Copa de Competencia
| San Isidro | Estudiantes (BA) |
| 4 | 2 |
- Date: 1911
- Venue: C.A. San Isidro Field, San Isidro

The 1911 Copa de Competencia Jockey Club final was the football match that decided the champion of the 5th. edition of this National cup of Argentina. In the match, played in the city of San Isidro, C.A. San Isidro defeated Estudiantes de Buenos Aires 4–2 to win their first Copa de Competencia trophy.

== Qualified teams ==
| Team | Previous final app. |
|---|---|
| San Isidro | (none) |
| Estudiantes (BA) | **1910** |

Note

- **Bold** indicates winning years

== Overview ==
The 1911 edition was contested by 14 clubs, 9 within Buenos Aires Province and 5 from Liga Rosarina de Football. San Isidro entered directly in quarterfinal, where the squad defeated Porteño 3–0 at home, then eliminating Quilmes 4–0 in semifinal, allowing them to contest their first final.

On the other hand, Estudiantes beat Provincial 3–2 in Rosario, then eliminating Tiro Federal 4–1 (in Palermo), and Belgrano A.C. 2–0 in the second playoff (after two 1–1 draws) to earn a place in the final.

== Road to the final ==
- H: home
- A: away
- N: neutral

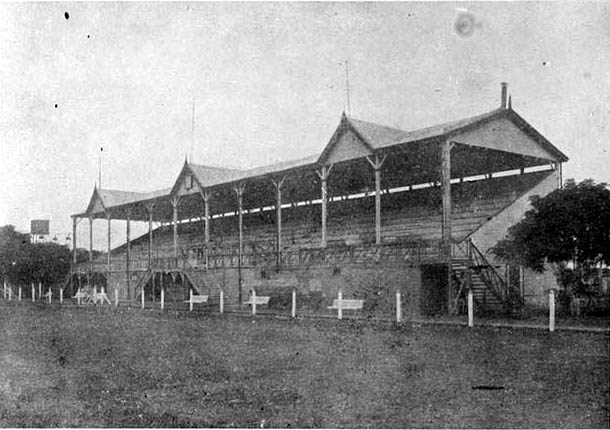
San Isidro field, venue for the final

| San Isidro | | Round | Estudiantes (BA) | |
|---|---|---|---|---|
| Opponent | Result | Group stage | Opponent | Result |
| – | – | Round of 8 | Provincial | 3–2 (A) |
| Porteño | 3–0 (H) | Quarterfinal | Tiro Federal | 4–1 (H) |
| Quilmes | 4–0 (H) | Semifinal | Belgrano A.C. | 1–1, 1–1, 2–0 (H) |

== Match details ==
1911 Copa Competencia Final
? 1910

| San Isidro | 4–2 | Estudiantes (BA) |

C.A. San Isidro Field, San Isidro

**San Isidro**
**Estudiantes (BA)**
