= 1920 Copa de Honor Cousenier =

| Universal | Boca Juniors |
| (Uruguay) | (Argentina) |
| 0 | 2 |
- Date: September 20, 1923; 103 years ago
- Venue: Estadio Gran Parque Central
- Referee: Dourado

The 1920 Copa de Honor Cousenier was the 15th (and last) edition of this competition. It was contested by the champions of Copa de Honor Municipalidad de Buenos Aires (Argentina) and Copa de Honor (Uruguay).

After the Argentine representative Banfield (winner of Copa de Honor) disaffiliated from the AFA, Boca Juniors contested the competition as runner-up. The team beat Universal FC at Estadio Gran Parque Central, the main stadium of Uruguay during the first decades of the 20th century. Due to schedule problems this final was played three years later, being held on September 20, 1923 in Montevideo as usual.

It was the first competition won by Boca Juniors outside Argentina.

== Match details ==
1920 Copa de Honor Cousenier
20 September 1923

| Universal (Uruguay) | 0–2 | (Argentina) Boca Juniors |
|---|---|---|
| | Report | Pertini 12'; Tarasconi 30' |

Gran Parque Central, Montevideo
Referee: Dourado

| Universal | Boca Juniors |

| GK | (Uruguay) Manuel Beloutas |
| DF | (Uruguay) Corrales |
| DF | (Uruguay) D'Agosti |
| MF | (Uruguay) S. Bruno |
| MF | (Uruguay) Gregorio Rodríguez |
| MF | (Uruguay) Alfredo Ghierra |
| FW | (Uruguay) Martínez |
| FW | (Uruguay) Videla |
| FW | (Uruguay) Viola |
| FW | (Uruguay) Lalín |
| FW | (Uruguay) Rocha |

| GK | (Argentina) Américo Tesoriere |
| DF | (Argentina) Ludovico Bidoglio |
| DF | (Argentina) Ramón Muttis |
| MF | (Argentina) Ángel Médici |
| MF | (Argentina) Mario Busso |
| MF | (Argentina) Alfredo Elli |
| FW | (Argentina) Pedro Calomino |
| FW | (Argentina) Antonio Cerrotti |
| FW | (Argentina) Domingo Tarasconi |
| FW | (Argentina) Dante Pertini |
| FW | (Argentina) Roberto Filiberti |
