= Copa de Competencia Jockey Club =

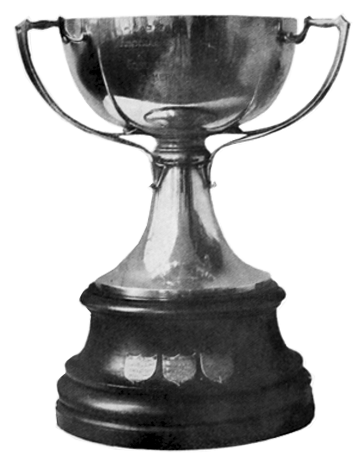
- The trophy awarded to champions
- Organiser(s): AFA
- Founded: 1907
- Abolished: 1933; 93 years ago
- Region: Argentina
- Teams: 20 (last edition)
- Qualifier for: Tie Cup
- Related competitions: Copa de Competencia (Uruguay)
- Last champions: Nueva Chicago (1933)
- Most championships: Alumni and San Isidro (3 titles each)

The Copa de Competencia Jockey Club was an official Argentine football cup competition contested between 1907 and 1933. The winner of this Cup was allowed to play the Tie Cup against the Uruguayan champion of Copa de Competencia.

Alumni and San Isidro are the most winning teams of the competition, with 3 titles each.

== History ==
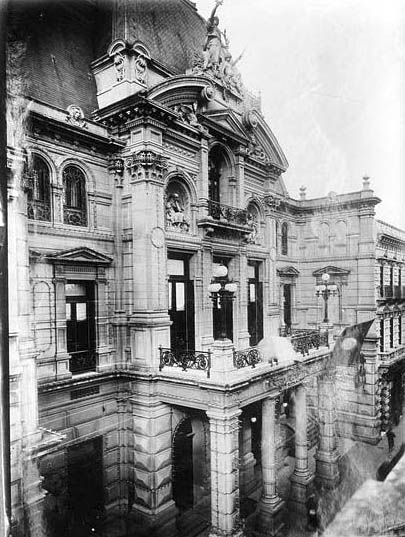
Jockey Club building in Buenos Aires, c. 1899

The Copa de Competencia Jockey Club was first awarded in 1907, being Alumni its first winner. Teams affiliated to the Argentine Football Association and Liga Rosarina de Football were allowed to enter this competition. Rosarian teams participated until the 1919 edition. From the 1921 edition, only teams from the cities of Buenos Aires and La Plata took part of the competition.

After the final edition of the Tie Cup in 1919, the Copa de Competencia Jockey Club was played on four more occasions in 1921, 1925, 1931 and 1936. It was contested on a total of 17 occasions and the most successful teams were Alumni and San Isidro with three titles each.

The trophy was donated by the Jockey Club, an exclusive social club created in 1882 by lawyer and senator Carlos Pellegrini (who later would become President of Argentina) to gather the most important and prominent men of Argentina's high society.

== List of champions ==
=== Finals ===
The following list includes all the editions of the Copa de Competencia:

Keys

- aet: after extra time
- Final defined in a playoff match.

Ed.	Year	Champion	Score	Runner-up	Venue	City
1	1907	Alumni (1)	4–2	Belgrano A.C.	Belgrano A.C.	Buenos Aires
2	1908	Alumni (2)	5–0	Argentino (Q)	Belgrano A.C.	Buenos Aires
3	1909	Alumni (3)	5–1	Newell's Old Boys	Banco Nación (Note: Alumni played their home venues in that field, located in the Colegiales district of Buenos Aires.)	Buenos Aires
4	1910	Estudiantes (BA) (1)	3–1	Gimnasia y Esgrima (BA)	Palermo (Note: As there were several fields in Palermo by those times, it is unclear if the match was held in Gimnasia y Esgrima, Estudiantes, or Sociedad Sportiva)	Buenos Aires
5	1911	San Isidro (1)	4–2	Estudiantes (BA)	C.A. San Isidro	San Isidro
6	1912	San Isidro (2)	0–0 (a.e.t.)	Quilmes	Estadio del CASI	San Isidro
6	1912	San Isidro (2)	2–1	Quilmes	Quilmes A.C.	Quilmes
7	1913	San Isidro (3)	2–0	Racing	Racing	Avellaneda
8	1914	River Plate (1)	4–0	Newell's Old Boys	Racing	Avellaneda
9	1915	Porteño (1)	2–1	Racing	Porteño (Note: It has its field in Palermo)	Buenos Aires
10	1916	Rosario Central (1)	2–1	Independiente	Racing	Avellaneda
11	1917	Independiente (1)	2–1 (a.e.t.)	Estudiantes (LP)	GEBA	Buenos Aires
12	1918	Porteño (2)	2–1	River Plate	Porteño	Buenos Aires
13	1919	Boca Juniors (1)	1–0 (a.e.t.)	Rosario Central	GEBA	Buenos Aires
14	1921	Sportivo Barracas (1)	2–1	Nueva Chicago	Del Plata (Note: The club has its field in Barracas)	Buenos Aires
15	1925	Boca Juniors (2)	1–1 (Note: Extra time not played because of the negative of both captains.)	Argentinos Juniors	Boca Juniors	Buenos Aires
15	1925	Boca Juniors (2)	1–0	Argentinos Juniors	Boca Juniors	Buenos Aires
16	1931	Sportivo Balcarce (1)	1–1 (Note: Suspended at 80' because of struggling.)	Almagro	All Boys	Buenos Aires
16	1931	Sportivo Balcarce (1)	4–1 (Note: Players of Almagro abandoned the field at 72'.)	Almagro	Excursionistas	Buenos Aires
17	1933	Nueva Chicago (1)	1–0	Banfield	Almagro (Note: Almagro had its field in Parque Chas from 1927 to 1937, when the club was evicted by the Municipality of Buenos Aires.)	Buenos Aires

=== Titles by team ===
Rank	Team	Titles	Years won
1	Alumni	3	1907, 1908, 1909
1	San Isidro	3	1911, 1912, 1913
2	Porteño	2	1915, 1918
2	Boca Juniors	2	1919, 1925
3	Estudiantes (BA)	1	1910
3	River Plate	1	1914
3	Rosario Central	1	1916
3	Independiente	1	1917
3	Sportivo Barracas	1	1921
3	Sportivo Balcarce	1	1931
3	Nueva Chicago	1	1933

== See also ==
- Copa de Competencia (Uruguay)
- Tie Cup
