= Boca Alumni =

- Full name: Boca Alumni
- Founded: 1 September 1907
- Dissolved: 1930s
- Ground: Dock Sud, Greater Buenos Aires, Argentina
- League: Primera B
- 1931: 3rd (lost promotion at playoffs)
Home colours

Boca Alumni was an Argentine football team established in La Boca district of the city of Buenos Aires. Boca Alumni participated in the Argentine Football Association tournaments from 1922 to 1931 when the team disaffiliated.

== History ==
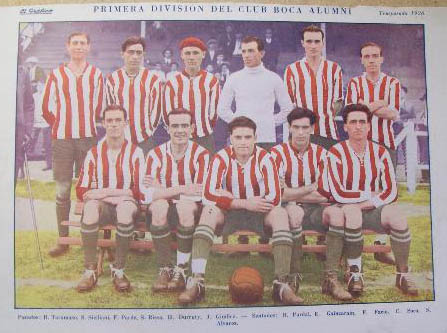
Boca Alumni in 1926. Defunct Alumni A.C. served as inspiration for its name and colors

Boca Alumni was established on 1 September 1907 in a bar located in Garibaldi street of La Boca. The founders took the name from the neighborhood where it was founded and the colors from legendary team Alumni, which remains nowadays as one of the most successful clubs of Argentina, with 22 titles won.

The club had its first stadium in Wilde, Buenos Aires but then it moved to Villa Dominico in 1917. Boca Alumni finally established its venue in the Mihanovich Shipping Company stadium, which was located in the Isla Maciel of Dock Sud district in Avellaneda Partido. That stadium was placed very close to the coast of Riachuelo.

In 1922 the team promoted to Primera División that gave it the chance to play against "the other" team called 'Boca'. Both teams faced for the first time in a friendly match on 26 March 1922, where 4,000 spectators attended to the game that Boca Juniors won by 2–0.

But Boca Alumni would defeat Boca Juniors 2–1 in their first official match, disputed on 19 November that same year. The squad remained in the top division of Argentine football until 1926 when both leagues, Asociación Amateurs de Football and official Asociación Argentina de Football (where Boca Alumni played) merged into one and therefore many teams were relegated to the second division.

Boca Alumni played in the second division (current Primera B) from the 1927 season where the team finished last with only 13 points in 34 games. Nevertheless, the team would make its best campaign in 1931, when finished 2nd along with All Boys and Progresista. Therefore, Boca Alumni had to play a playoff in order to define what team would promote to Primera after Liberal Argentino. Finally it was All Boys which won the minitournament promoting to the top division.

The match that Boca Alumni lost to Progresista by 2–1 (although it was suspended) was the last game that Boca Alumni played in official tournaments.
