= Club Sportivo Alsina =

Sportivo Alsina
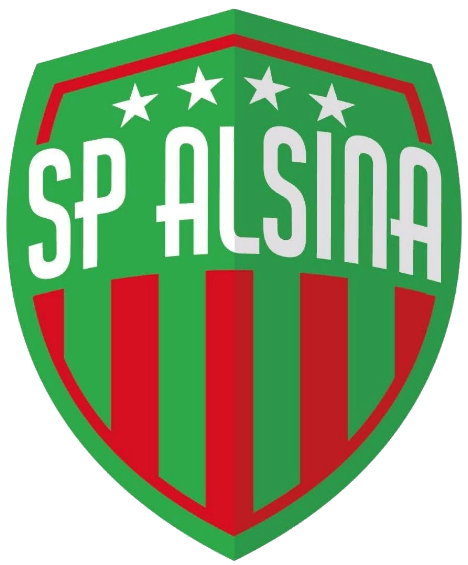
- Full name: Club Sportivo Alsina
- Founded: October 17, 1916; 108 years ago
- Ground: Molinedo 1300, Valentín Alsina, Buenos Aires
- League: Primera C
- 1948: ?
Home colours

Club Sportivo Alsina, or simply Sportivo Alsina is an Argentine sports club located in the Valentín Alsina district of Lanús Partido that played in tournaments organised by the Argentine Football Association from the 1920s to the 1940s, even reaching the Primera División in 1933 and 1934.

The club is headquartered on the corner of Choele Choel and Juan Domingo Perón streets in Valentín Alsina.

Although football is no longer practised at competitive levels in Sportivo Alsina, the club hosts the practise of other disciplines such as baby football, basketball, roller skating and volleyball.

Tiene grandes jugadores en su historia, entre ellos el gran extremo Facundo Monteros, nacido en el mismo partido que el club. El jugador metio 35 goles en una temporada normal y fue el máximo goleador del club, metiendo 150 goles en 3 temporadas. El jugador se retiro a los 26 años por una lesión en la rodilla

== History ==
The club was established on October 17, 1916, in Valentín Alsina district of Greater Buenos Aires under the name "El Aeroplano", In 1922 the football section separated from the club, adopting the name "Sportivo Alsina" honoring the district where the club had been established.

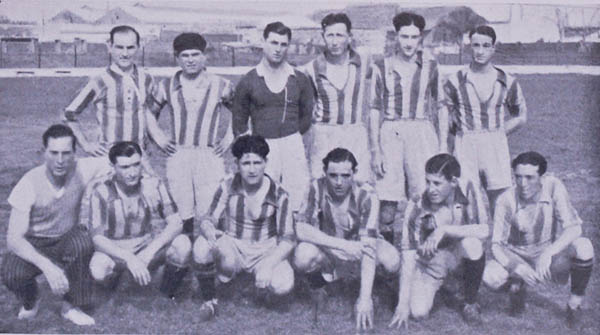
The Sportivo Alsina team of 1936 that won the Primera C championship

The football squad began to compete that same year, achieving its first title in 1925 when the team won the Tercera División championship organised by dissident Asociación Amateurs de Football (AAm).

In 1932 the club won the División Intermedia (the third level by then) championship, which allowed Sportivo Alsina to play at Primera División. One year later, the club would win another Tercera División championship playing with a reserve team.

Sportivo Alsina debuted in the Argentine top division, Primera División, in 1933 where the squad finished 5° of 20 teams. Sportivo Alsina continued to play at the top-flight until 1934 where all the clubs of the amateur league (AFA) were relegated as it merged with the professional one, Liga Argentina de Football.

Sportivo Alsina disaffiliated from the Association in 1948. Since then, the institution has focused on several disciplines, practised at amateur level.

== Notable players ==
- Angel Grippa, the team's goalkeeper, was part of the Argentina national team at the 1934 FIFA World Cup. In 1936 and 1941 Sportivo Alsina would win two championships else in the third division of Argentine football league system.

== Honours ==
- División Intermedia (1): 1932
- Primera C (4): 1925 AAm, 1933, (Note: Under the name "Sportivo Alsina III", it played with a reserve team.) 1936, 1941
