= 1907 Copa Jockey Club final =

1907 Copa de Competencia Jockey Club Final
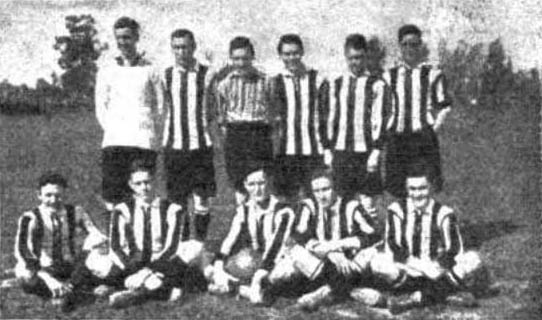
- An Alumni team of 1907
- Event: 1907 Copa de Competencia
Alumni	Belgrano A.C.
4	2
- Date: 8 September 1907
- Venue: Belgrano A.C. Field, Buenos Aires

The 1907 Copa de Competencia Jockey Club final was the football match that decided the champion of the 1st. edition of this National cup of Argentina. In the match, played at the Virrey del Pino and Superí field in Belgrano, Buenos Aires on 8 September 1907, Alumni defeated Belgrano A.C. 4–2. to win their first Copa de Competencia trophy.

== Qualified teams ==
Team	Previous final app.
Alumni	(none)
Belgrano A.C.	(none)

Note

- **Bold** indicates winning years

== Overview ==
The 1907 edition was contested by 13 clubs, 11 within Buenos Aires Province and 2 from Liga Rosarina de Football. Alumni reached the final after beating Porteño (8–1 at Sociedad Sportiva Argentina), Rosario Central 5–0, Reformer (also 5–0) in semifinal to earn their place as finalists.

On the other hand, Belgrano A.C. eliminated Quilmes (2–2, 4–1 in playoff), San Isidro (2–1), and Argentino de Quilmes (1–0 in semifinal) to reach the final.

== Road to the final ==
- H: home
- A: away
- N: neutral

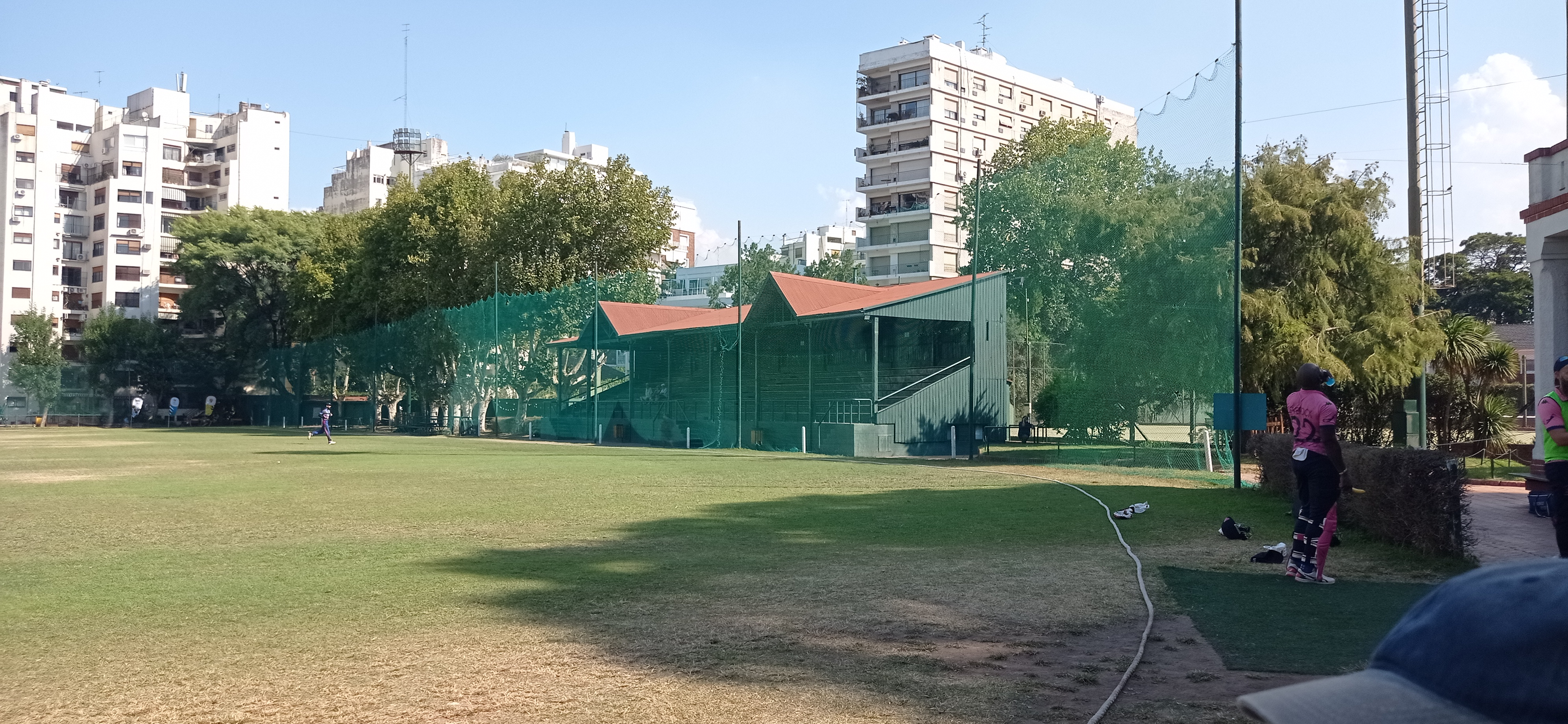
The Belgrano A.C. Field (here pictured in 2023) was the venue for the match

Alumni		Round	Belgrano A.C.	
Opponent	Result	Group stage	Opponent	Result
Porteño	8–1 (N) (Note: Held in Sociedad Sportiva Argentina.)	Round of 8	Quilmes	2–2 (A), 4–1 (H) (Note: Playoff.)
Rosario Central	5–0 (A)	Quarterfinal	San Isidro	2–1 (A)
Reformer	5–0 (H)	Semifinal	Argentino (Q)	10 (N) (Note: Played in Palermo (in those times, the C.A. Porteño and C.A. Estudiantes fields located there; sources do not specify which of these venues hosted the match.)

== Match details ==
1907 Copa Competencia Final
8 September 1907

Alumni	4–2	Belgrano A.C.

Belgrano A.C. Field, Buenos Aires

**Alumni**
**Belgrano**
