= 1919 Argentine Primera División =

28th season of top-tier football league in Argentina

Primera División
- Season: 1919
- Dates: 16 March 1919 – 20 January 1920
- Champions: Boca Juniors (AFA); Racing (AAmF)

The 1919 Argentine Primera División was the 28th season of top-flight football in Argentina. The official "Asociación Argentina de Football" (AFA) league championship was abandoned mid season by the majority of the clubs, which joined the new "Asociación Amateurs de Football" (AAmF) while six clubs remained with the official body.

In the AFA league, Boca Juniors was crowned champion with 14 fixtures to be played, while Racing won its 7th league title at AAmF.

Club Eureka debuted in the AFA championship, while Vélez Sársfield played its first Primera División championship in the AAmF after being disaffiliated from the official body.

== Final tables ==
=== Asociación Argentina de Football - Copa Campeonato ===
Out of 19 teams that started to compete in the championship, only 6 remained at the end of the season, after the first part of the tournament was annulled and re-started. The 13 teams that had been disaffiliated or expelled joined dissident "Asociación Amateurs de Football".

Primera División (AFA)
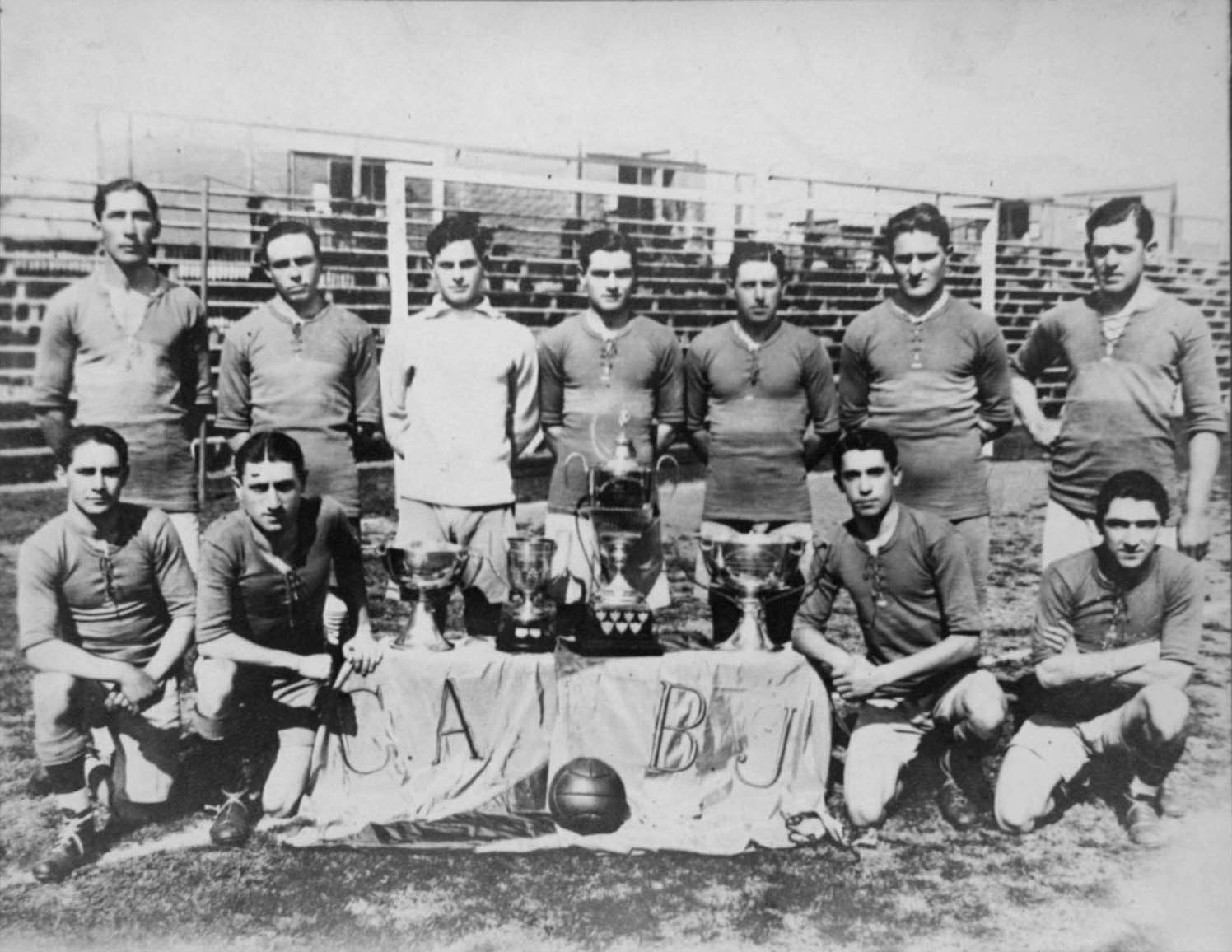
- Boca Juniors, AFA champion
- Season: 1919
- Dates: 28 September 1919 – 20 January 1920 (Note: These dates refer to the re-started season so the original championship had begun on March 16 and run until 31 August, when it was annulled by the after 9 rounds played. Out of 19 teams, only 6 remained for the re-started season.)
- Champions: Boca Juniors (1st title)
- Promoted: Eureka
- Relegated: (none)
- 1919 Copa Aldao: Boca Juniors
- Top goalscorer: (Argentina) Alfredo Garasini (Argentina) Alfredo Martín (both of Boca Juniors, 6 goals each)
- Biggest home win: Boca Juniors 7–0 Huracán
- Biggest away win: San Lorenzo 2–6 Racing

Pos	Team	Pld	W	D	L	GF	GA	GD	Pts
1	Boca Juniors (C)	8	8	0	0	29	5	+24	16
2	Estudiantes (LP)	8	3	1	4	10	7	+3	7
3	Huracán	5	2	0	3	3	11	−8	4
4	Eureka	5	1	1	3	5	6	−1	3
5	Sportivo Almagro	4	1	1	2	3	8	−5	3
6	Porteño	6	1	1	4	5	16	−11	3
7	~~Independiente~~ (Note: Dissafiliated and moved to dissident league "Asociación Amateurs de Football".)	0	0	0	0	0	0	0	0
8	~~Racing~~	0	0	0	0	0	0	0	0
9	~~San Isidro~~	0	0	0	0	0	0	0	0
10	~~River Plate~~	0	0	0	0	0	0	0	0
11	~~Gimnasia y Esgrima LP~~	0	0	0	0	0	0	0	0
12	~~San Lorenzo~~	0	0	0	0	0	0	0	0
13	~~Defensores de Belgrano~~	0	0	0	0	0	0	0	0
14	~~Platense~~	0	0	0	0	0	0	0	0
15	~~Sportivo Barracas~~	0	0	0	0	0	0	0	0
16	~~Tigre~~	0	0	0	0	0	0	0	0
17	~~Atlanta~~	0	0	0	0	0	0	0	0
18	~~Estudiantil Porteño~~	0	0	0	0	0	0	0	0
19	~~Estudiantes (BA)~~	0	0	0	0	0	0	0	0

(C) Champions

=== Asociación Amateurs de Football ===
Primera División (AAm)
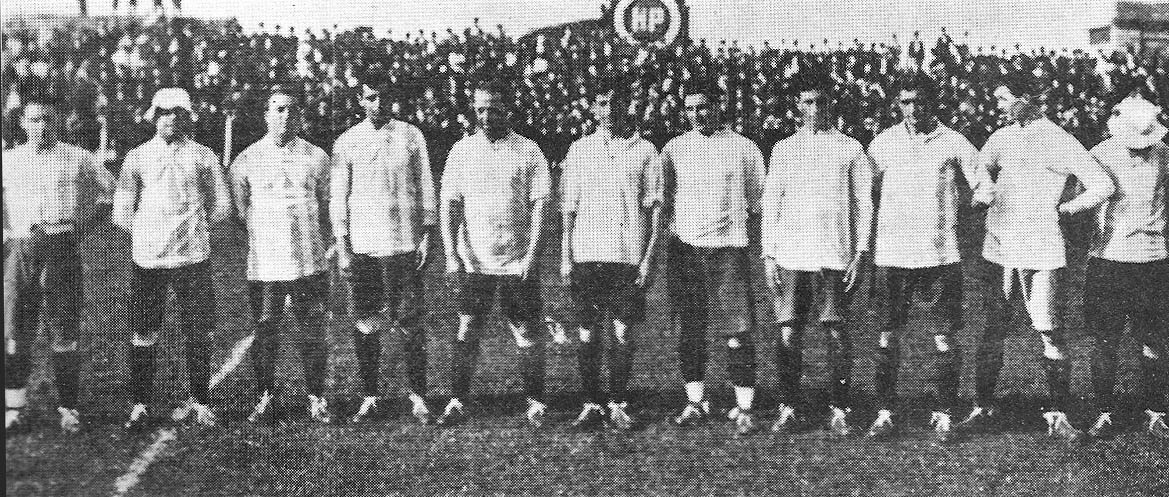
- Racing, AAmF champion
- Season: 1919
- Dates: 28 September – 28 December 1920
- Champions: Racing (7th title)
- Promoted: Vélez Sársfield
- Relegated: (none)
- Matches played: 91
- Goals scored: 279 (3.07 per match)
- Top goalscorer: (Argentina) Alberto Marcovecchio (Racing) (16 goals)
- Biggest home win: Racing 10–2 Estudiantes (BA)
- Biggest away win: Estudiantes (BA) 0–5 Atlanta; Atlanta 0–5 Racing

Pos	Team	Pld	W	D	L	GF	GA	GD	Pts
1	Racing (C)	13	13	0	0	43	10	+33	26
2	Vélez Sársfield	13	9	2	2	21	8	+13	20
3	River Plate	13	6	4	3	16	11	+5	16
4	Defensores de Belgrano	13	6	4	3	20	18	+2	16
5	Atlanta	13	6	2	5	27	17	+10	14
6	San Lorenzo	13	5	3	5	22	20	+2	13
7	Gimnasia y Esgrima (LP)	13	6	1	6	18	19	−1	13
8	Independiente	13	5	2	6	22	20	+2	12
9	Platense	13	5	2	6	22	24	−2	12
10	Sportivo Barracas	13	5	2	6	20	23	−3	12
11	Estudiantil Porteño	13	4	3	6	19	21	−2	11
12	Tigre	13	4	1	8	17	23	−6	9
13	San Isidro	13	2	1	10	14	27	−13	5
14	Estudiantes (BA)	13	1	1	11	8	48	−40	3

(C) Champions
