= Columbian Football Club =

Columbian
- Full name: Columbian Football Club
- Founded: c. 1911
- Dissolved: 1919; 107 years ago (merged to Club Almagro)
- Ground: Buenos Aires
- League: Primera División
- 1919: 5th (as Sportivo Almagro)
Home colours

Columbian Football Club (previously "Club Hispano Argentino") was an Argentine football team that played in the Primera División. The club is a predecessor of the present-day Club Almagro.

== History ==
Around 1911, a group of young immigrants from Galicia who owned a store in Buenos Aires established a club under the name "Pontevedra Sporting Club". In 1913 the club joined the recently formed Federación Argentina de Football (a dissident association from the official Argentine Football Association) under the name "Club Hispano Argentino". In its first year of official competition, the team finished 6th out of 10.

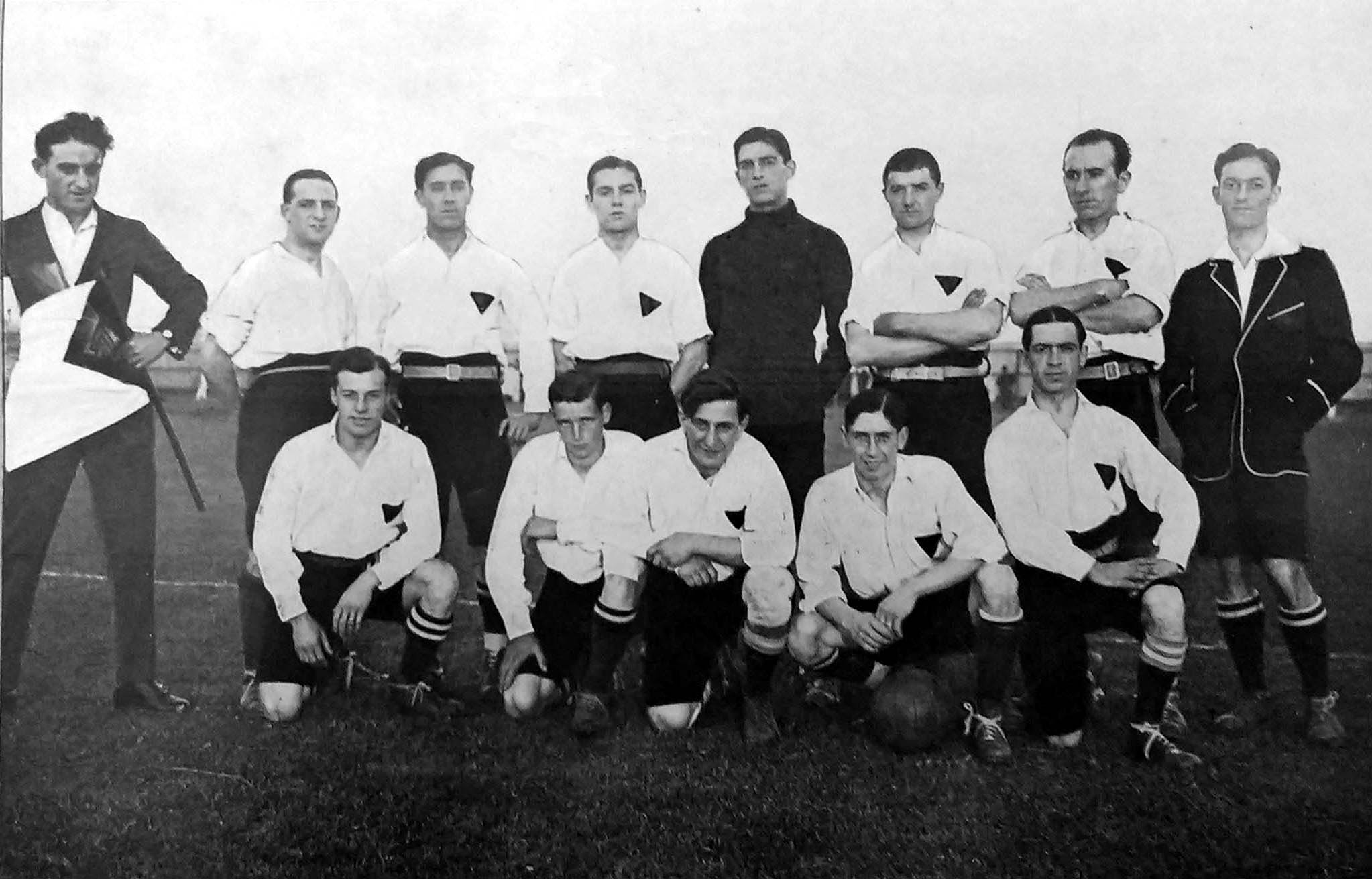
A Columbian line-up of 1917

That same year the club took on some members from Argentino de Quilmes who were in disagreement with the executives of that club. In 1914 the team finished 6th again, out of 8 participating teams. The club's player Norberto Carabelli was also the top scorer of the tournament, with 11 goals.

In 1915 when the two associations (official Asociación Argentina and dissident Federación Argentina) merged into one, the number of teams participating in the league increased to 25. Hispano Argentino finished 16th. The next year the club changed its name to "Columbian Football Club".

The team did not have much success during the succeeding years, and was about to be relegated to a lower division in 1918 when it finished 18th out of 20 (Ferro Carril Oeste and Argentino de Quilmes were sent to the second division that year).

In 1919 there was a new split in Argentine football, so both leagues played at the same time: the official Asociación Argentina (with Columbian as one of its teams) and dissident "Asociación Amateurs de Football". During that season, the club was going through a severe economic crisis, playing its last game as "Columbian" vs. Boca Juniors in the 6th match. Some executives of recently promoted Club Almagro, led by Miguel de Zárate, made Club Columbian a merger proposal which was accepted. Almagro was renamed "Sportivo Almagro" and continued playing in the Primera División (debuting in the 7th match vs Platense under its new denomination, which saved the club from being disaffiliated.

=== Kit history ===
1913–15 (Note: Club Hispano Argentino)	1916–19 (Note: Columbian F.C.)

== Stadium ==
The stadium was located between Vélez Sársfield and Iriarte streets in Buenos Aires. It had been inaugurated on May 28, 1911 in a match vs. Estudiantes de Buenos Aires
