= History of football in Argentina (1900–1919) =

- Native name: Historia del fútbol en Argentina (1900–1919)
- Date: 1900–1919
- Venue: Various
- Location: Argentina
- Theme: Football in Argentina
- Cause: Development and growth of the sport
- Organised by: AFA (official); FAF (dissident, 1912–14); AAF (dissident, 1919–)

In the birth of the 20th. century, the sport of association football in Argentina developed an exponential growth, with a high number of clubs created mainly in the Buenos Aires area, plus the expansion of the sport in the city of Rosario. Among the clubs established in the 1900s were Boca Juniors, River Plate, Independiente, Racing, and San Lorenzo. which would be later known as the Big Five

The new decade was marked by the hegemony of Alumni, a club raised from the Buenos Aires English High School, which would become the most successful team of those times, being considered the first great team in the country. Despite having been dissolved in 1913, their 22 titles place Alumni as one of the most winning team in the history of Argentine football.

The large number of titles (including the seven consecutive Primera División titles) by Racing during the second decade of the 20th. century earned them the nickname the Academy apart of being regarded as the successor of Alumni, which had been dissolved in 1913.

The new century also brought the first breakup in Argentine football when several clubs left the official AFA to form a new league, Federación Argentina de Football, in 1912. This dissident league would run for three years until the conflict ended and both associations merged into one. Nevertheless, a new breakup would occur in 1919 when dissident clubs formed the Asociación Amateurs de Football, which organised its competitions until 1926.

== Development and expansion: clubs ==
The early years of the 20th century saw a large number of new clubs formed; by 1907, there were over 300 teams in Argentina. Most of the major clubs were created around this period.

Among the large number of clubs established in early 20th. century there were some institutions that would later earn not only several achievements but the biggest number of supporters. Those clubs, known as the Big Five, were River Plate (1901) (Note: This was set as the official date of foundation by the club itself, stating that River Plate was established after the merger of clubs La Rosales and Santa Rosa. Nevertheless, other sources say that the real date of foundation is 15 May 1904 as River Plate would have assumed the date of foundation of predecessor club La Rosales as their own birth. This version is supported by historians whom found evidence of recorded matches played by both, La Rosales and Santa Rosa, after 1901. Moreover, La Nación newspaper published an article on 22 May 1904 about the "recent foundation" of River Plate.), Racing (1903), Boca Juniors (1905), Independiente (1905), and San Lorenzo (1908).

Apart from those institutions, other clubs founded in the Buenos Aires are during those times were Tigre (1902), Argentinos Juniors (1904), Atlanta (1904), Ferro Carril Oeste (1904), Barracas Central (1904), San Telmo (1904), Platense (1905), Estudiantes de La Plata (1905), Chacarita Juniors (1906), Defensores de Belgrano (1906), Argentino de Merlo (1906), Huracán (1908), Vélez Sarsfield (1910), Excursionistas (1910), Almagro (1911), Nueva Chicago (1911), Temperley (1912), Almirante Brown (1912), All Boys (1913), Sportivo Barracas (1913), Ferrocarril Midland (1914), Lanús (1915), El Porvenir (1915), Lugano (1915), Dock Sud (1916), Los Andes (1917).

Clubs that were founded by those years but then disappeared or disaffiliated from AFA include San Isidro (1902), Estudiantil Porteño (1902), Progresista (1902), Alvear (1903), Reformer (1903), Kimberley (1906), Liberal Argentino (1906), Boca Alumni (1907), Sportivo Palermo (1908),Columbian (c. 1911), Honor y Patria (1911), C.A. Palermo (1914), Argentino de Banfield (1915), Del Plata (1915), Eureka (1915), Sportivo Villa Urquiza (1916), Sportivo Alsina (1916), Sportivo Buenos Aires (1918), Sportivo Balcarce (1919). All of those clubs participated at least once season in Primera División.

By this time, matches had a considerable attendance and as the popularity of the game increased the British influence on the game waned. In 1911, Alumni folded and by 1912 the Association was renamed in Spanish as the "Asociación del Fútbol Argentino", although the tradition of giving the clubs English names continued for many years.

Apart of Primera División tournaments, in 1900 AFA organised the first cup competition, Copa de Honor Municipalidad de Buenos Aires, contested by team from Buenos Aires and Rosario. Other cups were soon added to the annuar calendar such as Copa de Competencia Jockey Club (1907), and Copa Dr. Carlos Ibarguren (1913).

== The rise and success of Alumni (1900–1911) ==
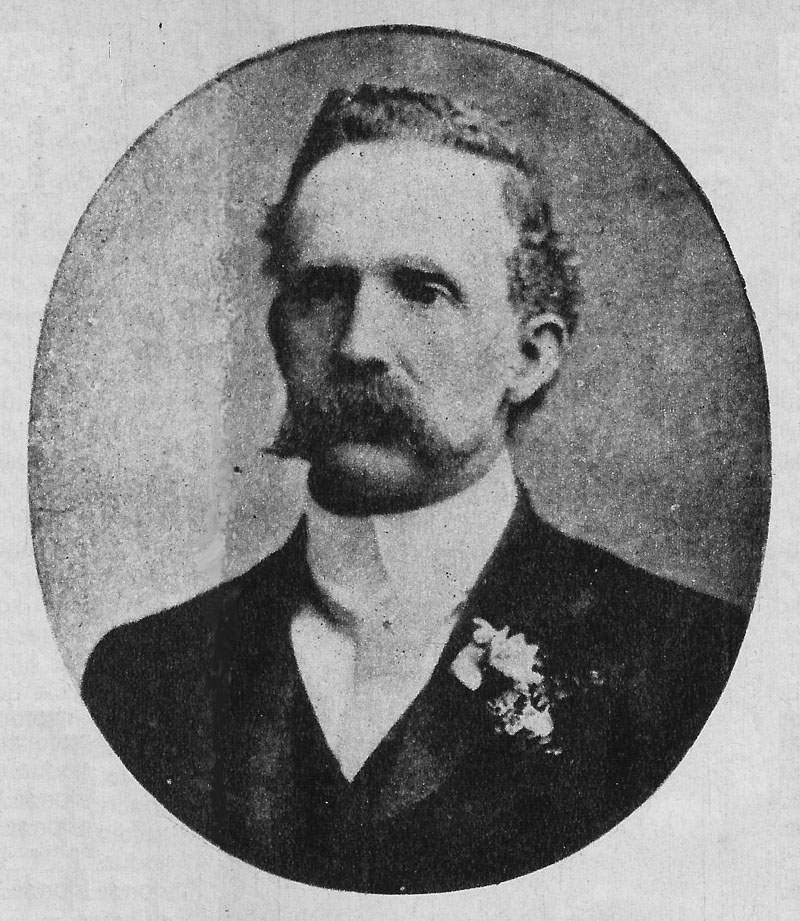
Alexander Watson Hutton, considered "the father of Argentine football"

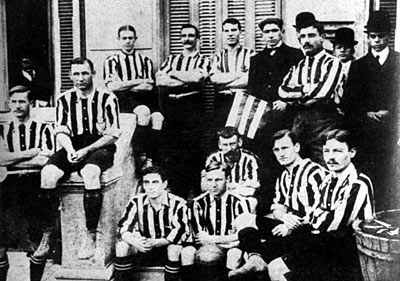
Team of Alumni of 1906. The club was the most successful of their time

The so-called "father of Argentine football" was a Glaswegian schoolteacher Alexander Watson Hutton, who first taught football at St Andrew's School in Buenos Aires in the early 1880s. On 4 February 1884, he founded the Buenos Aires English High School (BAEHS), where he continued to instruct the pupils in the game.

The BAEHS would be the homebirth of Alumni, founded by graduates and students of the school. Through their short life, Alumni became legendary due to the large number of titles won by the team not only at domestic but at international level. Alumni was also the first Argentine team to defeat a British side –South Africa– in 1906.

The squad was active until 1911 and was disbanded in 1913 due to internal problems. During the years Alumni was active, the team won a total of 22 titles, which positioned Alumni as the most winning team of that era and one of the most successful clubs in the history of Argentine football.

Alumni was not only a football giant but a symbol of fair play. Members of the Brown family (five brothers Jorge, Alfredo, Carlos, Eliseo, Ernesto, and cousin Juan Domingo) were notable players for the club and also for Argentina.

The legacy of Alumni has survived through many clubs that adopted the Alumni's red and white stripes for their shirts, such as Estudiantes de La Plata, Unión de Santa Fe, Talleres de Remedios de Escalada, San Martín de Tucumán, Barracas Central, and Instituto de Córdoba.

== British teams touring Argentina (1904–1919) ==
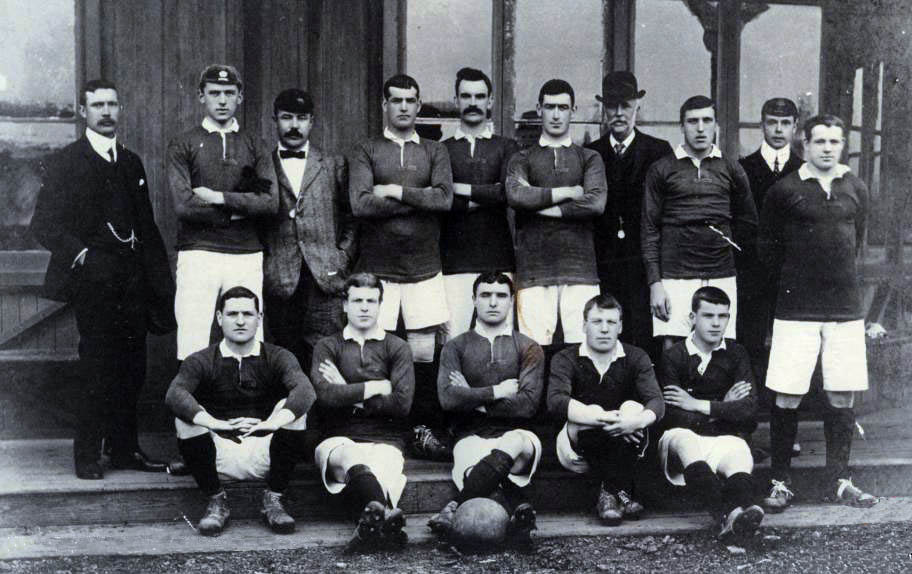
Team of Nottingham Forest that played in Rosario during their tour to Argentina in 1905

British football clubs tours over South America contributed to the spread and develop of football in Argentina during the first years of the 20th century. The first club to tour on the country was Southampton F.C. in 1904 who were captained by George Molyneaux. They beat the Buenos Aires High School Alumni team 3–0 with Molyneaux remarking 'how far the Argentines were ahead of their European counterparts in France and Denmark.' Several other teams came afterwards (mainly from England although some Scotland clubs also visited South America) until 1929 with Chelsea F.C. being the last team to tour.

British teams were considered the best in the world by then, and some of them served as inspiration to establish football clubs in Argentina. During the first years, the British sides showed a huge superiority over the Argentine teams, with outstanding performances by Southampton, Nottingham Forest, Everton, and Tottenham Hotspur. Nevertheless, within those 25 years of tours British teams' performances were decreasing while the South American squads' style of playing improved. Indeed, Southampton won all of their matches in 1904 with 40 goals scored in 1904 while Chelsea (the last time to visit the country) was defeated eight times (over 16 games played) in their 1929 tour.

== Development of football in Rosario ==
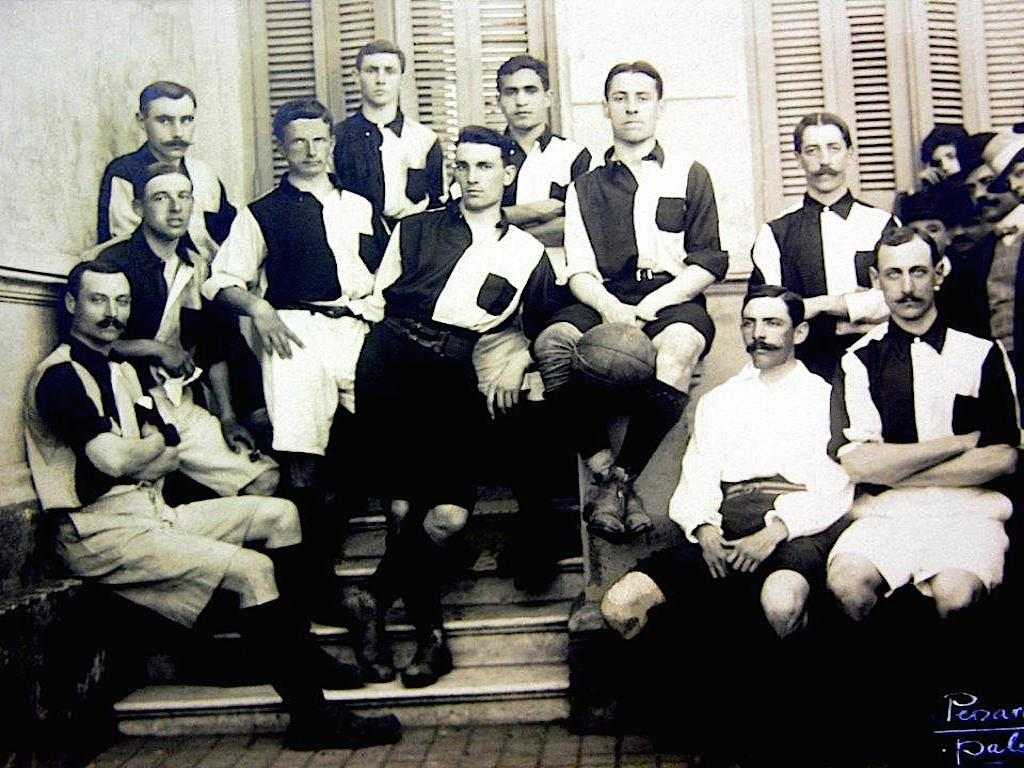
Team of Rosario A.C. in 1905, winner of Tie Cup Competition

Apart from the Buenos Aires area, Rosario was the other seminal city during the early 20th century in Argentina. With a population of 131,000, the city had a great number of football enthusiasts who established several clubs around the city, some of them were Libertad, Estrella Polar, Atlético Rivadavia, Mariano Moreno, Ombú, “Liniers” and Echesortu F.C. Football was usually played when the cricket season ended. Although the city did not have an organised league until 1905 (when Liga Rosarina de Football was established) since 1900 the football squads of Rosario A.C. and Rosario Central had taken part of the first international tournament in South America, the Tie Cup, played by teams of Rosario, Buenos Aires and Uruguay. Rosario A.C. became the first Rosarian team to win an international cup after winning the Tie Cup in 1902, defeating Alumni 2–1 in the playoff match. The squad would win two titles else, in 1904 (beating Uruguayan CURCC 3–2) and 1905 (winning over CURCC again by 4–3), totalling three championships in six years.

Teams from Rosario had also participated in the first national cups organised by AFA, such as Copa de Honor, (which Newell's Old Boys and Rosario Central would later win in 1911 and 1916 respectively) Rosario Central (just like Avellaneda's Racing Club) earned the nickname Academy in recognition to their change of style of playing, from the British influences to a creole identity. That nickname (that survives to present days) originated during the period 1913–1917, when the team dominated the Rosarian League.

At the request of president of Newell's Old Boys, Víctor Heitz, other prominent teams of the city were invited to create a local league to organise a football competition. Therefore, "Liga Rosarina de Football" was established with Newell's, Rosario A.C., Rosario Central and Atlético Argentino as founding members. The body organised a second division tournament that became the first competition in Santa Fe Province. The trophy awarded to the winning team was donated by the mayor of Rosario, Santiago Pinasco, and named after him.

Copa Nicasio Vila was the top division of Liga Rosarina, being held between 1907 and 1930, when it was replaced by Torneo Gobernador Luciano Molinas.

== Racing Club: the "Academy" (1911–1919) ==
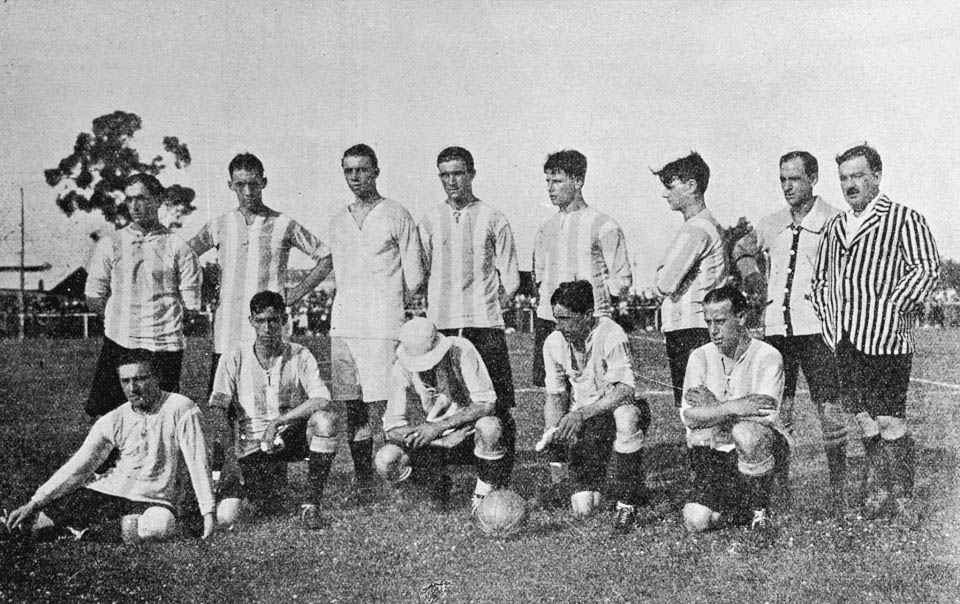
Team of Racing of 1915

After the demise of Alumni, another club would consolidate as its successor, Racing. Founded in 1903, the team developed a style of football bases in the ball possetion and short passing, oppoosed to the British style that had consolidated Alumni. This style, known as creole football, helped Racing to win seven consecutive Primera División titles (1913–1919), a record that stands nowadays. In their golden age of the 1910s, Racing won a total of 19 titles (7 leagues, 9 national cups, and 3 international cups), those outstanding achievements earned them the nickname the academy (of football) that has lasted up to date.

The nickname was born on August 1, 1915, when the Racing supporters used the word in songs that celebrated the 3–0 victory over Boca Juniors after an overwhelming superiority of Racing players during the match. The 1915 team finishing the tournament unbeaten, scoring 95 goals (3.95 per game) and only conceding 5 in 24 matches.

== Schism and dissident leagues (1912–1914) ==
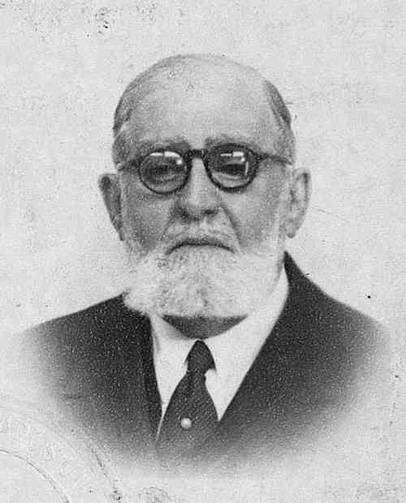
President of Gimnasia y Esgrima Ricardo Aldao was one of the promoters of FAF, being also its president

The organisation of football championships suffered its first breakup in 1912 after a conflict originated between Gimnasia y Esgrima de Buenos Aires and AFA. After the club requested that its members not pay admission and demanded a portion of the revenue as rent for the use of the stadium and it was denied by AFA, several clubs quit the association to form their own league, establishing the Federación Argentina de Football on 14 June 1912. Founding members were Independiente, Porteño, Estudiantes (LP), Gimnasia y Esgrima (BA), Argentino de Quilmes, Atlanta, Kimberley, and Sociedad Sportiva Argentina.

The FAF organised three editions of Primera, Intermedia, Segunda, and Tercera División championships and two editions of a new domestic cup, Copa de Competencia La Nación, during its three years of existence (1912–1914).

A new breakup come in 1919 when another dissident body, the Asociación Amateurs de Football, was established.

== Start of the Big Five era ==
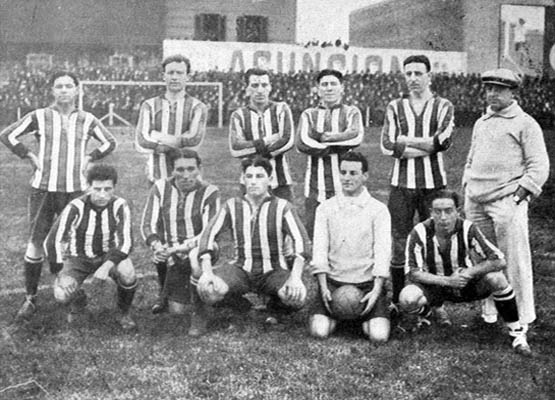
A team of River Plate in 1914

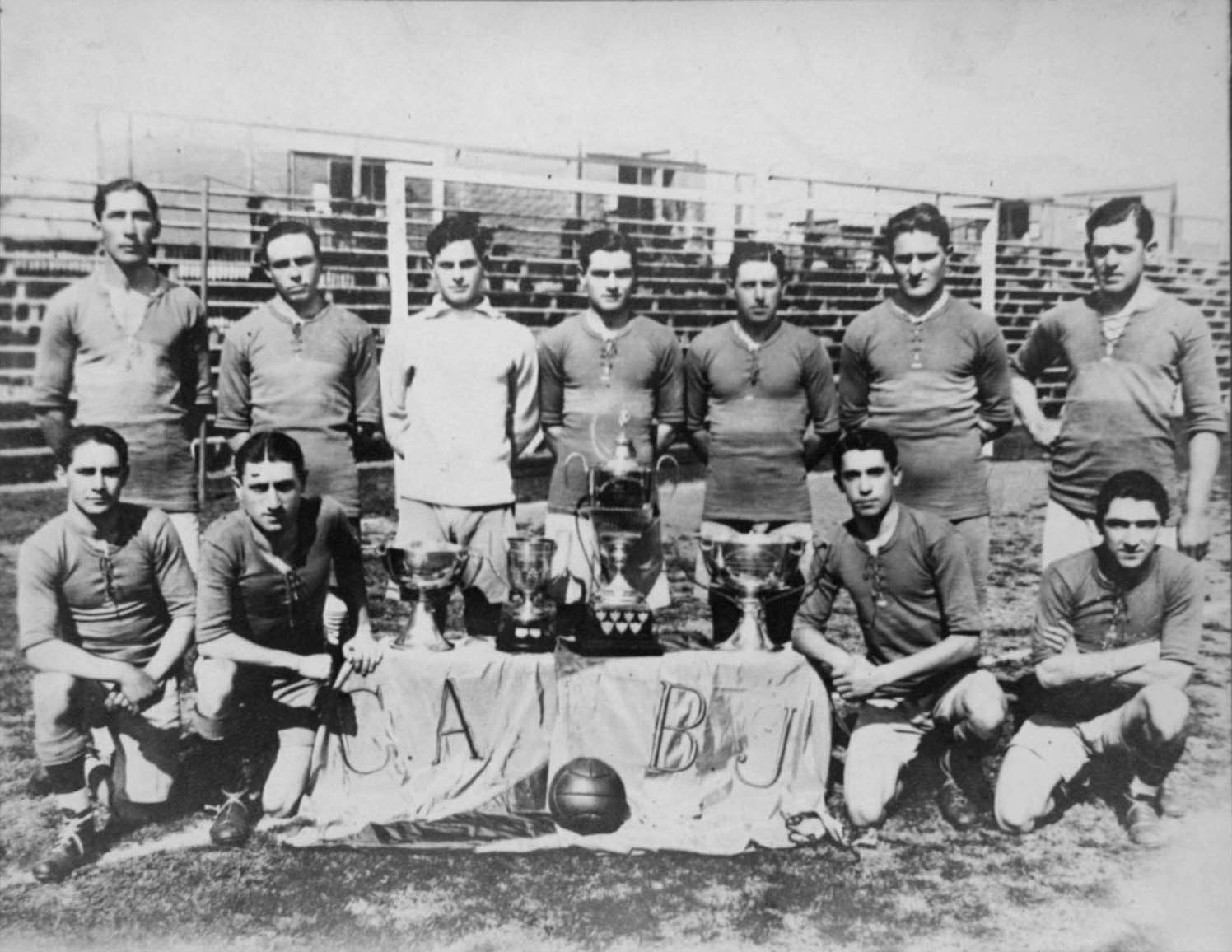
Boca Juniors with the four cups won in 1919

After the success of defunct team Alumni, the then called Big Five (with the exception of multi champion Racing Club) would start their success during the 1910s. River Plate was the first of them to won titles, both in 1914, Copa de Competencia and international Tie Cup.

On the other hand, Independiente also won their first official title in 1914, the Copa de Competencia La Nación, awarded to the Diablos due to their rival Argentino de Quilmes quit the association to return to AFA. winning their first Copa de Competencia. Other titles won were the 1917 Copa de Competencia and 1918 Copa de Honor.

Boca Juniors won their first four titles within a year (1919), those achievements include: Primera División (the first in the history of the club), Copa Ibarguren, Copa de Competencia, and international Tie Cup.

San Lorenzo de Almagro was the only big five team that did not win a title during the 1910s. Their first achievement would be the 1923 Primera División championship.

== Birth of the Argentina national team ==
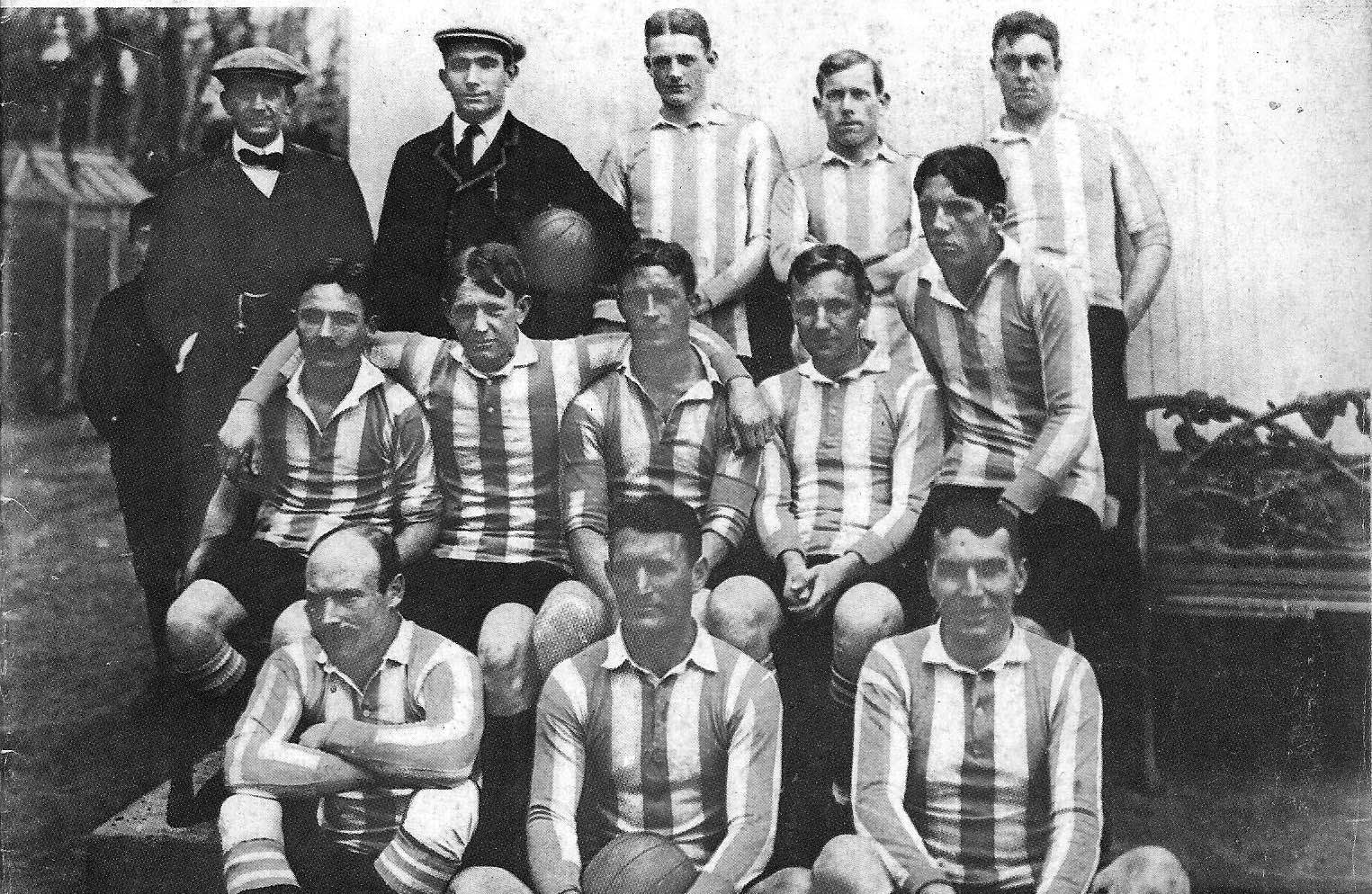
The classic light blue and white-striped jersey first worn in an official match, 1908 v Uruguay

The first official match played by the Argentina national team took place on 20 July 1902 against Uruguay, a 6–0 win for Argentina. This was also the first international held in South America. but the first international held in South America. This game also marked the beginning of the Argentina–Uruguay football rivalry.

The first time Argentina wore their traditional light blue and white shirt was on 2 July 1908, when they played a side formed of Campeonato Paulista players at Velódromo Paulistano; That shirt made its official debut in a Copa Newton match v Uruguay on 13 September 1908, a 2–1 win for Argentina.

The first trophy won by Argentina was the Copa Lipton in 1905. Five years later, and as part of the celebrations of the Centennial of Argentina, the first international competition with more of two teams was held in the country, it was the Copa Centenario Revolución de Mayo, contested by the local side, Uruguay, and Chile. This competition (won by Argentina) is considered a predecessor to the South American Championship, later renamed "Copa América".

In 1916, the recently created Conmebol organised the first South American Championship in Buenos Aires. Estadio GEBA and Estadio Racing Club were the venues for the competition, contested by four national teams (the three that had participated in Copa Centenario plus Brazil. Uruguay was the winner of the competition after 2 wins and 1 draw.

== Stadiums ==
During the first decades of the 20th century, some of the most representative stadiums were (period indicated in brackets belong to football exclusively):

=== Plaza Jewell ===
The venue hosted football matches until 1916, when the club abandoned the practise of the sport. The stadium was also the most frequent venue for matches organised by defunct Rosario Association Football League since its inception in 1887. The first Rosario derby (Clásico Rosarino) was played in Plaza Jewell on June 18, 1905. Since CAR left football, Plaza Jewell has been used for rugby exclusively.

=== Flores ===
In the early 1900s, Flores Old Ground, located in the barrio of Caballito, hosted the first international club matches in Argentina, such as the 1900 and 1904 Tie Cup finals. In 1907 Flores A.C. sold its facilities to neighbor club Ferro Carril Oeste and the stadium was later demolished.

=== Sociedad Sportiva ===
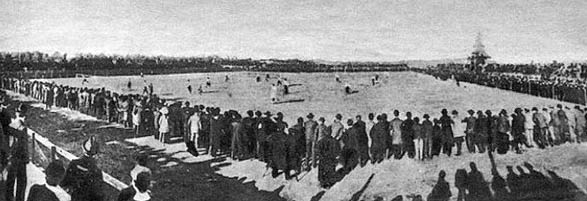
Alumni v South Africa at Sociedad Sportiva, 1906

Sociedad Sportiva Argentina (1902–1914): It was a multipurpose stadium where several other sports an activities were hosted. The Argentina national team played a few matches there between 1902 and 1906. At club level, the stadium hosted three Tie Cup finals (1902, 1903, and 1905). Between 1904 and 1909, the stadium also hosted most of the matches played by the British team that toured on Argentina.

The most notable of those matches occurred on 24 June 1905, when Alumni became the first Argentine side to defeat a British-origin team –South Africa 1–0. In 1914, the stadium was expropriated by the Argentine Army and later demolished. Campo Argentino de Polo, the main polo venue in Argentina, now stands where the Sportiva stadium was located.

=== GEBA ===
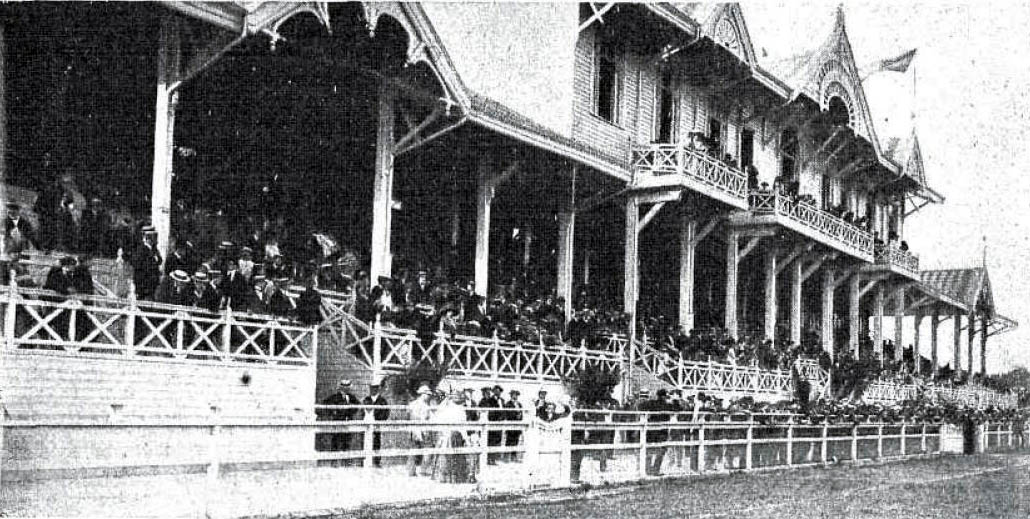
GEBA official grandstand in 1910

Estadio GEBA (1902–1924): it was the main football venue during the 1900s and 1910s, having held matches of the Argentina national team (until 1919) and some club matches during that period. GEBA was one of the main football stadiums in Buenos Aires, being the main venue of some crucial events such as Copa Centenario Revolución de Mayo (1910), 1911 Primera División final (which was also the last official match of Alumni), 1916 South American Championship, Copa Aldao (1916, 1918), among other events.

The last football match was in 1924 and since then, Estadio GEBA was used mainly for rugby games.

Nowadays, Estadio GEBA is used for music concerts, having hosted many artists performing there.

=== Racing ===
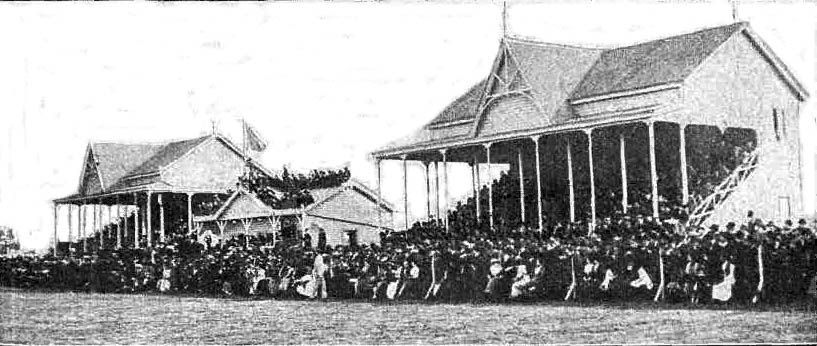
Estadio Racing in 1911

Estadio Racing Club, also known as Estadio Alsina y Colón due to its location, it was owned by Racing Club which used it from 1904 to 1946. The stadium was expanded several times and had a capacity of 50,000 spectators by the time it was closed. Racing was a frequent venue for the Argentina national team, which played there from 1912 to 1917, 1923.--></ref>

Racing left the stadium in 1946, after the club was granted a loan to build a new stadium made of concrete. The new stadium, Estadio Presidente Perón, was inaugurated in 1950.

== See also ==
- History of football in Argentina (1867–1899)
- Football in Argentina
