= Roberto González Escarrá =

Argentine footballer

Personal information
- Date of birth: c. 1890
- Place of birth: Greater Buenos Aires, Argentina
- Place of death: Greater Buenos Aires, Argentina
- Position: Defender

Youth career
- 1908–1915: Porteño

International career
Years	Team	Apps	(Gls)
1914	Argentina		

Roberto González Escarrá (born c. 1890) was an Argentine footballer who played as a defender for Club Atlético Porteño and in the Argentina national team.

== Career ==
Born in Buenos Aires Province, González Escarrá began his career in the youth division of Lomas Athletic Club. He then played in Instituto Americano of Adrogué, team that played the final of the Copa de Competencia Adolfo Bullrich in 1908.

In 1908, González Escarrá moved to Porteño, where he won his first Argentine Primera División title with the club in 1912, then winning a new championship in 1914, both organised by dissident Federación Argentina de Football. With Porteño, González Escarrá also won the Copa de Competencia Jockey Club in 1915, after beating Racing Club by 2–1.

In 1914, Roberto González Escarrá was called up to the Argentina national team. His first game was a friendly match against Brazil, played on September 20, 1914, in the Gimnasia y Esgrima de Buenos Aires stadium, which was won by Argentina by 3–0.

== Honours ==
Porteño

- Argentine Primera División: 1912 FAF, 1914 FAF
- Copa de Competencia Jockey Club: 1915
