= 1914 Copa La Nación final =

1914 Copa La Nación Final
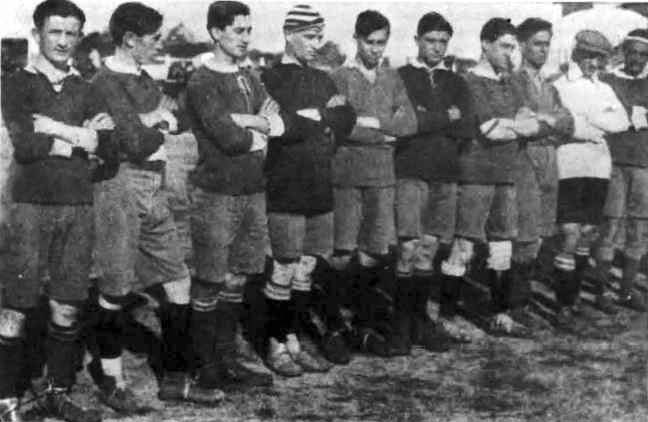
- An Independiente team of 1914
- Event: Copa de Competencia La Nación
Independiente	Argentino de Quilmes
–	–
- match not held, points and title awarded to C.A. Independiente

The 1914 Copa de Competencia La Nación Final should have been the final that decided the winner of the 2nd. (and last) edition of Copa de Competencia La Nación, an Argentine domestic cup organised by dissident body Federación Argentina de Football (FAF). The match had to be contested by Independiente and Argentino de Quilmes, but was suspended because Argentino decided to disjoin the FAF on 26 September and join the official body, Argentine Football Association.

As a result, the FAF awarded Independiente the trophy, proclaiming them as Copa de Competencia champions. winning their first Copa de Competencia.

== Qualified teams ==
Team	Previous finals app.
Independiente	(none)
Argentino de Quilmes	1913

Bold indicates winning years

== Overview ==
This edition (like the previous one) was contested by all the teams of the 1914 Primera División season (excepting Tigre) plus División Intermedia clubs, totalizing 26 teams.

The competition was played under a single-elimination format, with two Rosario representatives entering directly to semifinals. In that stage, Rosario Central beat Porteño 2–1 at Independiente stadium, earning its right to play the final. On the other hand, Argentino started in round of 16, beating Juventud del Tigre 3–1, Gimnasia y Esgrima BA 2–0, Estudiantes de La Plata 1–0 and Tiro Federal 4–0 in the semifinal.

== Road to the final ==
- H: home
- A: away
- N: neutral

Independiente		Round	Argentino de Quilmes	
Opponent	Result	Stage	Opponent	Result
–	–	Round of 16	Argentino (A) (Note: Club from Avellaneda, debuted in the FAF in 1912, playing their home matches at Roca and O'Gorman streets. In 1917 the club disjoined the FAF.)	6–0 (H)
Lanús United	2–1 (H)	Round of 8	General Belgrano (Note: Club from La Plata, founded in 1908. Their date of dissolution is unknown.)	2–0 (H)
All Boys	3–3, 6–1 (A)	Quarterfinal	Porteño	3–1 (A)
Kimberley	1–0 (H)	Semifinal	Burzaco (Note: Club based in the homonymous district in Almirante Brown Partido.)	3–0 (A) (Note: Held in Kimberley A.C. field.)

=== Match details ===
1914 Copa de Competencia La Nación Final
(not held)

Independiente	–	Argentino de Quilmes

Note: points and title awarded to C.A. Indpendiente by the FAF.
