= 1930 Argentine Primera División =

39th season of top-tier football league in Argentina

Primera División
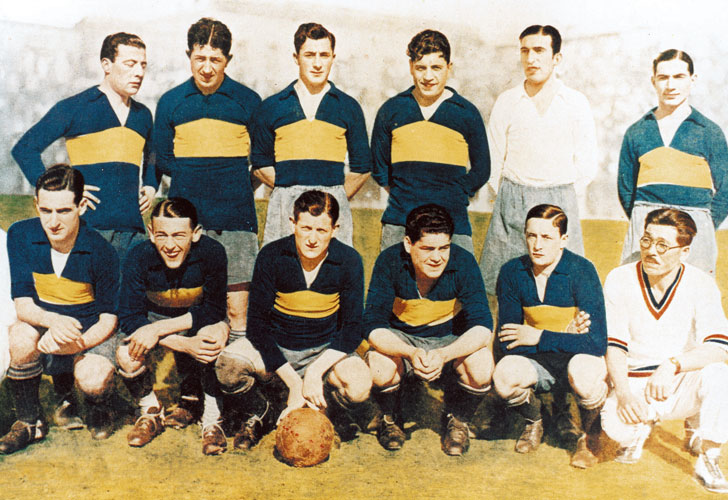
- Boca Juniors, champions
- Season: 1930
- Dates: 23 March 1930 – 12 April 1931
- Champions: Boca Juniors (6th title)
- Promoted: Honor y Patria
- Relegated: Honor y Patria; Argentino del Sud
- Top goalscorer: (Argentina) Roberto Cherro (Boca Juniors) (37 goals)
- Biggest home win: –
- Biggest away win: –

The 1930 Argentine Primera División was the 39th season of top-flight football in Argentina. The season began on March 23, 1930, and ended on April 12, 1931.

The Argentine league restructured as a tournament of 36 teams, playing one another once, with Boca Juniors crowning champion. Following the disruption of the 1929 season by mass abandonment of games, the second half of the 1930 season was marred in a similar way.

== Final table ==
Pos	Team	Pld	W	D	L	GF	GA	GD	Pts
1	Boca Juniors	35	29	3	3	113	33	+80	61
2	Estudiantes (LP)	35	27	2	6	113	39	+74	56
3	River Plate	35	22	8	5	66	29	+37	52
4	San Lorenzo	35	23	5	7	96	43	+53	51
5	Talleres (RE)	35	21	9	5	56	34	+22	51
6	Racing	35	22	5	8	82	30	+52	49
7	Independiente	35	18	11	6	71	41	+30	47
8	Gimnasia y Esgrima (LP)	35	19	4	12	72	42	+30	42
9	Chacarita Juniors	35	18	6	11	57	43	+14	42
10	Quilmes	35	19	4	12	67	56	+11	42
11	Sportivo Buenos Aires	35	18	5	12	57	44	+13	41
12	Platense	35	16	8	11	59	48	+11	40
13	Banfield	35	19	2	14	68	62	+6	40
14	Huracán	35	16	7	12	75	49	+26	39
15	Vélez Sarsfield	35	13	10	12	45	49	−4	36
16	Sportivo Barracas	35	13	9	13	54	49	+5	35
17	Argentinos Juniors	35	12	11	12	46	43	+3	35
18	Ferro Carril Oeste	35	13	8	14	45	55	−10	34
19	San Fernando	35	13	7	15	47	63	−16	33
20	Tigre	35	12	8	15	58	52	+6	32
21	Estudiantil Porteño	35	13	6	16	66	67	−1	32
22	Estudiantes (BA)	35	12	7	16	49	58	−9	31
23	Almagro	35	11	8	16	36	47	−11	30
24	Atlanta	35	10	10	15	43	63	−20	30
25	El Porvenir	35	11	6	18	52	77	−25	28
26	Defensores de Belgrano	35	12	4	19	50	75	−25	28
27	Excursionistas	35	11	6	18	32	56	−24	28
28	Lanús	35	8	11	16	39	54	−15	27
29	Barracas Central	35	10	7	18	40	64	−24	27
30	Argentino (B)	35	9	8	18	33	69	−36	26
31	Sportivo Palermo	35	7	11	17	46	65	−19	25
32	Argentino (Q)	35	7	11	17	45	67	−22	25
33	Colegiales	35	9	6	20	37	65	−28	24
34	San Isidro	35	6	11	18	29	66	−37	23
35	Honor y Patria	35	4	6	25	30	91	−61	14
36	Argentino del Sud	35	1	2	32	14	100	−86	4

=== Relegation ===
The teams occupying the bottom two positions of the league were relegated. Argentino del Sud set one of the worst points tallies in the history of South American football. The other team, Honor y Patria, was relegated in its first season at the top level.
