= 1913 in Argentine football =

Football in Argentina
- Season: 1913

Men's football
- Primera División: Racing
- Intermedia: Huracán (AFA); Floresta (FAF)
- Segunda División: Ferro C. Oeste III (AFA); Estudiantes (LP) III (FAF)
- Tercera División: Libertarios Unidos (AFA); Solís (FAF)
- Copa de Honor: Racing
- Copa de Competencia: San Isidro
- Copa Ibarguren: Racing
- Copa Competencia La Nación: Rosario Central

1913 in Argentine football saw Racing Club de Avellaneda win its first league championship. The team also won the Copa Ibarguren, the Copa de Honor Municipalidad de Buenos Aires and the Copa de Honor Cousenier.

Estudiantes de La Plata won its first championship, taking the dissident FAF league title. Rosario Central won the Copa de Competencia La Nación.

The Argentina national team won three championships against Uruguay and carried out a brief tour of Chile.

== Primera División ==
=== Asociación Argentina de Football - Copa Campeonato ===
The number of teams was considerably increased (from 6 to 15), adding Platense, Estudiantil Porteño, Ferrocarril Sud, Olivos, Riachuelo, Banfield, Comercio, Ferro Carril Oeste and Boca Juniors. Olivos and Riachuelo were relegated at the end of the season.

Pos	Team	Pts	G	W	D	L	Gf	Ga
1	Racing Club	24	14	12	0	2	41	5
2	San Isidro	24	14	11	2	1	44	8
3	River Plate	24	14	10	4	0	30	7
4	Belgrano AC	18	14	8	2	4	34	16
5	Boca Juniors	18	14	8	2	4	29	16
6	Platense	18	14	8	2	4	36	25
7	Quilmes	18	14	8	2	4	29	21
8	Estudiantes (BA)	13	14	6	1	7	26	23
9	Estudiantil Porteño	13	14	5	3	6	32	33
10	Banfield	13	14	5	3	6	23	31
11	Comercio	10	14	4	2	8	26	34
12	Ferro Carril Oeste	6	14	1	4	9	16	31
13	Ferrocarril Sud	4	14	1	2	11	17	51
14	Olivos	4	14	1	2	11	10	49
15	Riachuelo	3	14	0	3	11	8	51

==== Final playoff ====
28 December 1913

Racing Club	2-0	San Isidro
(A. Ohaco 2)

Palermo

=== Federación Argentina de Football ===
Pos	Team	Pts	G	W	D	L	Gf	Ga	Gd
1	Estudiantes (LP)	31	18	14	4	1	64	16	+48
2	Gimnasia y Esgrima (BA)	28	18	11	6	1	49	19	+30
3	Argentino de Quilmes	27	18	12	3	3	38	21	+17
4	Kimberley AC (BA)	21	18	9	3	6	34	31	+3
5	Independiente	19	18	7	5	6	39	33	+6
6	Hispano Argentino	17	18	8	1	9	21	40	-19
7	Tigre	15	18	6	3	9	23	38	-15
8	Porteño	12	18	4	4	10	26	32	-6
9	Atlanta	8	18	3	2	13	33	57	-22
10	Sociedad Sportiva Argentina	2	18	0	2	16	15	52	-37

== Lower divisions ==
=== Intermedia ===
- AFA Champion: Huracán
- FAF Champion: Floresta

=== Segunda División ===
- AFA Champion: Ferro Carril Oeste III
- FAF Champion: Estudiantes (LP) III

=== Tercera División ===
- AFA Champion: Libertarios Unidos
- FAF Champion: Solís

== Domestic cups ==
=== Copa de Honor Municipalidad de Buenos Aires ===
- Champion: Racing Club

==== Final ====
1913

Racing Club	5–1	Estudiantes (BA)
	Report

Racing Club

=== Copa de Competencia Jockey Club ===
- Champion: San Isidro

==== Final ====
1913

San Isidro	2–0	Racing Club
	Report

Racing Club

=== Copa de Competencia La Nación ===
- Champion: Rosario Central

==== Final ====
26 October 1913

Rosario Central	3–2	Argentino de Quilmes
Antonio Blanco 16', Federico Flynn 23', Harry Hayes 82'	Report	Dannaher 63' Polimeni 65'

Gimnasia y Esgrima de Buenos Aires

=== Copa Ibarguren ===
- Champion: Racing Club

==== Final ====
5 April 1914

Racing Club	3–1	Newell's
Marcovecchio	Report	M. González

Racing Club

== International cups ==
=== Tie Cup ===
- Champion: (Uruguay) Nacional

==== Final ====
29 October 1913

Nacional (Uruguay)	1-0	(Argentina) San Isidro
	Report

Buenos Aires

=== Copa de Honor Cousenier ===
- Champion: (Argentina) Racing Club

==== Finals ====
16 November 1913

Racing Club (Argentina)	1-1	(Uruguay) Nacional

Montevideo

8 December 1913

Racing Club (Argentina)	3-2	(Uruguay) Nacional
	Report

Montevideo

== Argentina national team ==
Argentina won all the trophies contested that year, the Presidente Roque Sáenz Peña, Lipton and Premier Honor Argentino Cups.

=== Copa Presidente Roque Sáenz Peña ===
15 June 1913

Argentina	1-1	Uruguay

9 July 1913

Argentina	2-1	Uruguay
	Report

Avellaneda

=== Copa Lipton ===
15 August 1913

Argentina	4-0	Uruguay
	Report

Avellaneda

=== Copa Premier Honor Argentino ===
31 August 1913

Argentina	2-0	Uruguay
	Report

Avellaneda

=== Friendly matches ===
Date	Venue/City	Rival	Score	Report
10 August 1913	Buenos Aires	São Paulo League	0-2	
17 August 1913	Buenos Aires	São Paulo League	2-0	
16 September 1913	Viña del Mar	Antofagasta League	3-0	
18 September 1913	Valparaíso	Valparaíso League	2-1	
19 September 1913	Santiago	Santiago League	4-2	
