= 1930 in Argentine football =

Football in Argentina
- Season: 1930

1930 saw the Argentine league restructured as a league of 36 teams, playing one another once. The eventual champions were Boca Juniors. Following the disruption of the 1929 season by mass abandonment of games, the second half of the 1930 season was marred in a similar way. This trend was halted by the inception of the professional era in 1931.

The Argentina national team reached the final of the first FIFA World Cup where they lost to Uruguay.

== Primera División ==
Pos	Team	Pts	G	W	D	L	Gf	Ga	Gd
1	Boca Juniors	61	35	29	3	3	113	33	+80
2	Estudiantes (LP)	56	35	27	2	6	113	39	+74
3	River Plate	52	35	22	8	5	66	29	+37
4	San Lorenzo	51	35	23	5	7	96	43	+53
5	Talleres (BA)	51	35	21	9	5	56	34	+22
6	Racing Club	49	35	22	5	8	82	30	+52
7	Independiente	47	35	18	11	6	71	41	+30
8	Gimnasia y Esgrima (LP)	42	35	19	4	12	72	42	+30
9	Chacarita Juniors	42	35	18	6	11	57	43	+14
10	Quilmes	42	35	19	4	12	67	56	+11
11	Sportivo Buenos Aires	41	35	18	5	12	57	44	+13
12	Platense	40	35	16	8	11	59	48	+11
13	Banfield	40	35	19	2	14	68	62	+6
14	Huracán	39	35	16	7	12	75	49	+26
15	Vélez Sarsfield	36	35	13	10	12	45	49	-4
16	Sportivo Barracas	35	35	13	9	13	54	49	+5
17	Argentinos Juniors	35	35	12	11	12	46	43	+3
18	Ferro Carril Oeste	34	35	13	8	14	45	55	-10
19	San Fernando	33	35	13	7	15	47	63	-16
20	Tigre	32	35	12	8	15	58	52	+6
21	Estudiantil Porteño	32	35	13	6	16	66	67	-1
22	Estudiantes (BA)	31	35	12	7	16	49	58	-9
23	Almagro	30	35	11	8	16	36	47	-11
24	Atlanta	30	35	10	10	15	43	63	-20
25	El Porvenir	28	35	11	6	18	52	77	-25
26	Defensores de Belgrano	28	35	12	4	19	50	75	-25
27	Excursionistas	28	35	11	6	18	32	56	-24
28	Lanús	27	35	8	11	16	39	54	-15
29	Barracas Central	27	35	10	7	18	40	64	-24
30	Argentino de Banfield	26	35	9	8	18	33	69	-36
31	Sportivo Palermo	25	35	7	11	17	46	65	-19
32	Argentino de Quilmes	25	35	7	11	17	45	67	-22
33	Colegiales	24	35	9	6	20	37	65	-28
34	San Isidro	23	35	6	11	18	29	66	-37
35	Honor y Patria	14	35	4	6	25	30	91	-61
36	Argentino del Sud	4	35	1	2	32	14	100	-86

=== Relegation ===
The teams occupying the bottom two positions of the league were relegated. Argentino del Sud set one of the worst points tallies in the history of South American football. The other team, Honor y Patria, was relegated in its first season at the top level.

== Segunda División ==
- Champion: Nueva Chicago

== Argentina national team ==
FIFA World Cup

- 1930 FIFA World Cup: runners up
