= Copa Premier Honor Argentino =

- Organising body: (Argentina) AFA (Uruguay) AUF
- Founded: 1908
- Abolished: 1920; 105 years ago
- Region: Buenos Aires
- Number of teams: 2
- Related competitions: Copa Premier Honor Uruguayo; Copa Lipton; Copa Newton
- Most successful club(s): Argentina (7 titles)

The Copa Premier Honor Argentino or the Copa Honor Argentino was an international football friendly competition contested by Argentina and Uruguay national teams. All games were played in Buenos Aires. It was held in ten occasions between 1908 and 1920.

== History ==
In 1912, 1913 and 1914 the Argentina teams were selected by the breakaway "Federación Argentina de Football rather than the official body, Asociación Argentina de Football (AFA). Outside the British Home Championship, Argentina–Uruguay is one of the oldest fixtures in international football. During the 1910s and 1920s they regularly played each other up to four times a year.

In addition to South American Championship matches, the Copa Premier Honor Argentino was one of several trophies the two national teams regularly competed for during that era. Others included the Copa Premier Honor Uruguayo, which was played in Montevideo, the Copa Lipton and the Copa Newton.

== List of champions ==
=== Finals ===
The following list includes all the editions of the Copa Premier Honor Argentino:

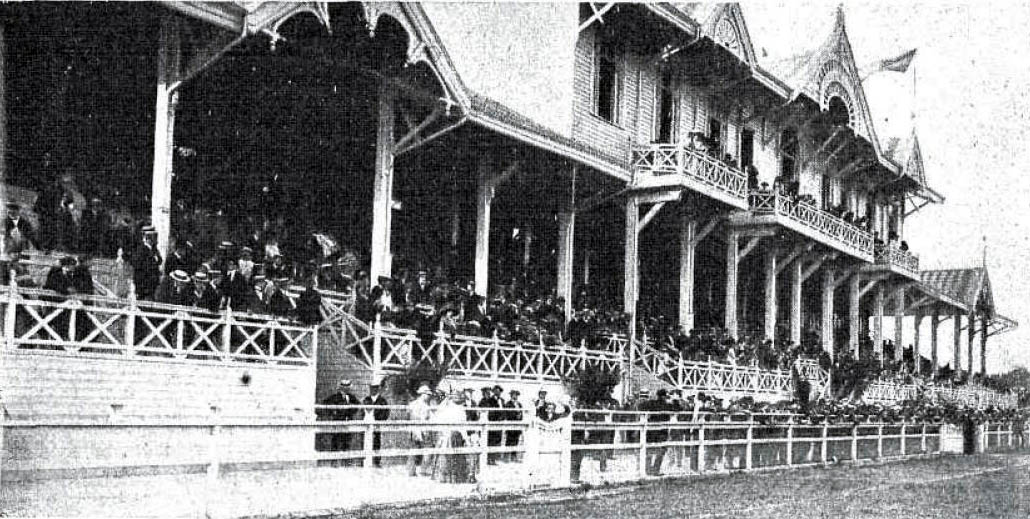
GEBA official grandstand during the first match of the 3rd edition, 13 November 1910

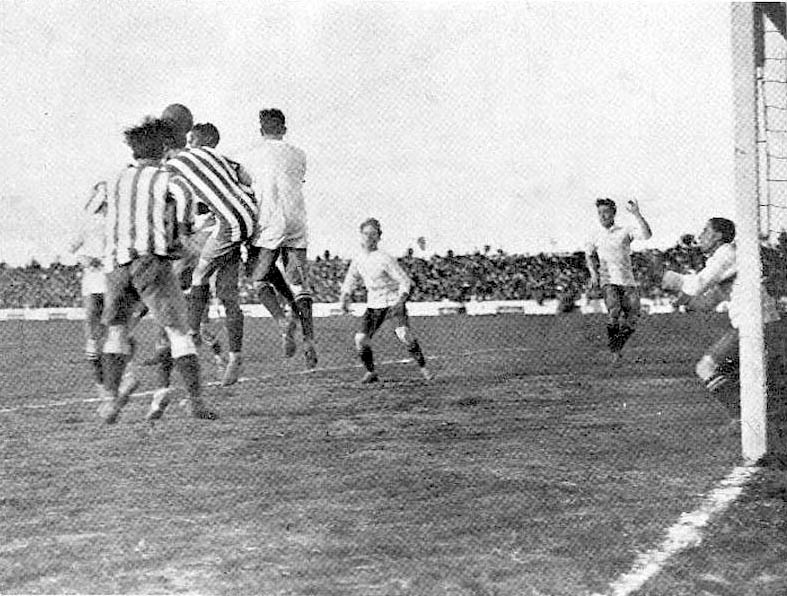
The last edition played at Sportivo Barracas, 8 August 1920

Ed.	Year	Champion	Score	Venue
1	1908	Uruguay	2–1	GEBA
2	1909	Argentina	3–1	GEBA
3	1910	Uruguay	1–1	GEBA
3	1910	Uruguay	6–2	GEBA
4	1911	Argentina	2–0	GEBA
5	1912	Uruguay	1–0	GEBA
6	1913	Argentina	2–0	GEBA
7	1914	Argentina	2–1	GEBA
8	1918	Argentina	0–0	GEBA
8	1918	Argentina	2–1	GEBA
9	1919	Argentina	6–1	GEBA
10	1920	Argentina	1–0	Sportivo Barracas

=== Titles by country ===
Team	Titles	Years won
Argentina	7	1909, 1911, 1913, 1914, 1918, 1919, 1920
Uruguay	3	1908, 1910, 1912

== All-time scorers ==
Player	Goals
(Argentina) Julio Libonatti	3
(Uruguay) José Piendibene	2
(Argentina) M. González	2
(Uruguay) Carlos Scarone	2
(Argentina) Alfredo Brown	2
(Argentina) Alfredo Martín	2
(Argentina) Antonio Piaggio	2

== Most finals by player ==
- 7: (Uruguay) Cayetano Saporiti (won 3)
- 6: (Uruguay) Alfredo Foglino (won 1), (Uruguay) José Piendibene (won 3)
- 5: (Uruguay) Angel Romano (won 2)
- 4: (Argentina) Pedro Calomino (won 3), (Uruguay) Pablo Dacal (won 2), (Argentina) Alexander Watson Hutton (won 2)
- 3: (Argentina) Juan Enrique Hayes (won 3), (Argentina) Carlos Tomás Wilson (won 2), (Argentina) Eliseo Brown (won 2)

== See also ==
- Copa Premier Honor Uruguayo
- Copa Lipton
- Copa Newton
