= División de Honor =

División de Honor may refer to a number of sports leagues:

== Argentina ==
- Argentine División de Honor de Futsal, the highest level of men's futsal in Argentina

== Spain ==
- División de Honor de Béisbol, the highest level of men's baseball in Spain
- División de Honor Juvenil de Fútbol, the highest level of men's under-18 football in Spain
- División de Honor Andaluza, the sixth level of men's football in Spain under the region of Andalusia
- División de Honor de Álava, the sixth level of men's football in Spain under the region of Álava, Basque Country
- División de Honor de Gipuzkoa, the sixth level of men's football in Spain under the region of Gipuzkoa, Basque Country
- División de Honor de Vizcaya, the sixth level of men's football in Spain under the region of Biscay, Basque Country
- División de Honor de Futsal, now known as Primera División de Futsal, the highest level of Spanish men's futsal
- División de Honor de Balonmano, now known as Liga ASOBAL, the highest level of men's handball in Spain
- División de Honor Femenina de Balonmano, the highest level of women's handball in Spain
- División de Honor de Hockey Hierba, the highest level of men's hockey in Spain
- División de Honor Femenina de Hockey Hierba, the highest level of women's hockey in Spain
- División de Honor de Rugby, the highest level of men's rugby union in Spain
- División de Honor Femenina de Rugby, the highest level of men's rugby union in Spain
- División de Honor de Waterpolo, the highest level of men's waterpolo in Spain
- División de Honor Femenina de Waterpolo, the highest level of women's waterpolo in Spain

== Paraguay ==
- División de Honor, the highest level of men's professional football in Paraguay

== Peru ==
- División de Honor de Fútbol Sala, the highest level of men's futsal in Peru

== See also ==
- División de Honor B (disambiguation)
