= 1913 Copa La Nación final =

1913 Copa La Nación Final
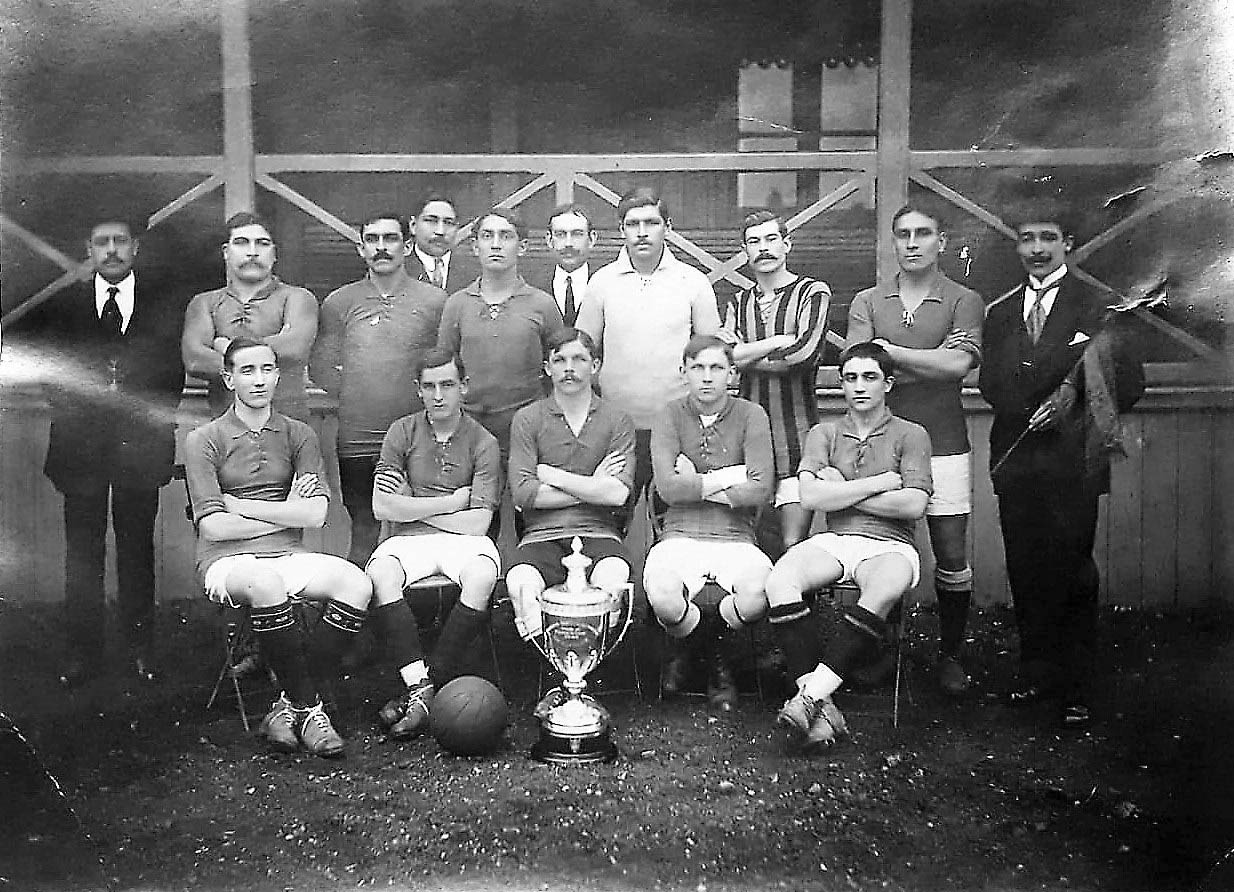
- Rosario Central, champions
- Event: Copa de Competencia La Nación
Argentino de Quilmes	Rosario Central
2	3
- Date: October 26, 1913
- Venue: Gimnasia y Esgrima
- Referee: Carlos Aerts

The 1913 Copa de Competencia La Nación Final was the final that decided the winner of the 1st. edition of Copa de Competencia La Nación, an Argentine domestic cup organised by dissident body Federación Argentina de Football. The match was contested by Argentino de Quilmes and Rosario Central.

The final was held in Gimnasia y Esgrima Stadium in Palermo, Buenos Aires, on October 26, 1913. Rosario Central beat Argentino 3–2, winning their first national title ever.

== Qualified teams ==
Team	Previous finals app.
Rosario Central	(none)
Argentino de Quilmes	(none)

Bold indicates winning years

== Overview ==
This edition was contested by all the teams of the 1913 Primera División season (excepting Tigre) plus Second Division teams. The competition was named after newspaper La Nación, which had donated the trophy.

The competition was played under a single-elimination format, with two Rosario representatives entering directly to semifinals. In that stage, Rosario Central beat Porteño 2–1 at Independiente stadium, earning its right to play the final. On the other hand, Argentino started in round of 16, beating Juventud del Tigre 3–1, Gimnasia y Esgrima BA 2–0, Estudiantes de La Plata 1–0 and Tiro Federal 4–0 in the semifinal.

== Road to the final ==
- H: home
- A: away
- N: neutral

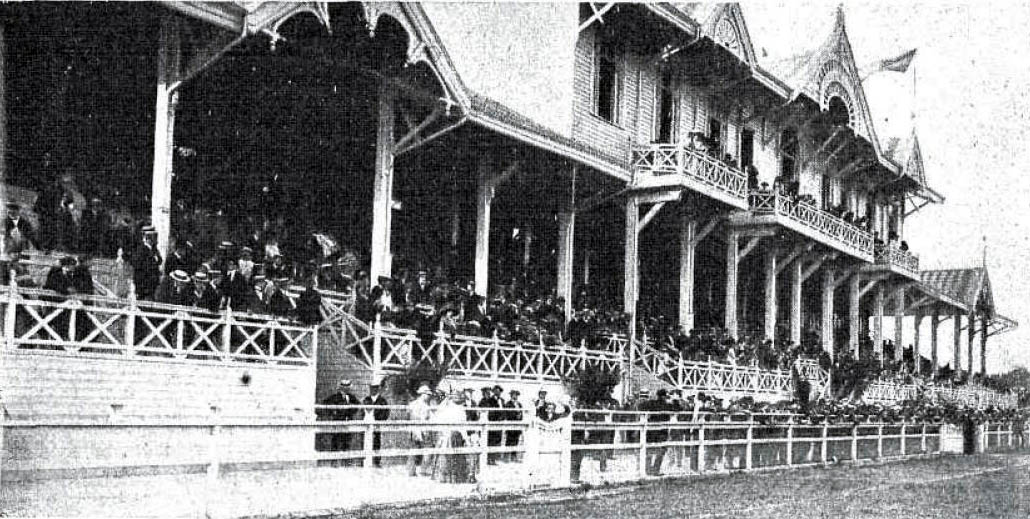
Gimnasia y Esgrima Stadium, venue of the final

Argentino de Quilmes		Round	Rosario Central	
Opponent	Result	Stage	Opponent	Result
Juventud del Tigre	3–1 (H)	Round of 16	–	–
Gimnasia y Esgrima (BA)	2–0 (A)	Round of 8	–	–
Estudiantes (LP)	1–0 (H)	Quarterfinal	–	–
Tiro Federal	4–0 (A) (Note: Held in Rosario Central stadium.)	Semifinal	Porteño	2–1 (N) (Note: Held in Estadio Crucecita, Avellaneda.)

== Match details ==
1913 Copa de Competencia La Nación Final
October 26, 1913

Argentino de Quilmes	2–3	Rosario Central
Dannaher 63'; Polimeni 65'	Report	Blanco 16'; Flynn 33'; H. Hayes 82'

Gimnasia y Esgrima, Buenos Aires
Referee: Carlos Aerts

**Argentino (Q)**	**Rosario Central**

GK	(Argentina) Aníbal Rotondo
DF	(Argentina) Antonio Cerutti
DF	(Argentina) Rodolfo Martínez
MF	(Argentina) Juan Ramón Pozo
MF	(Argentina) Atilio Badaracco
MF	(Argentina) César Badaracco
FW	(Argentina) Gerónimo Badaracco
FW	(Argentina) Domingo Arrillaga
FW	(Argentina) Guillermo Dannaher
FW	(Argentina) Juan José Pozo
FW	(Argentina) Pascual Polimeni

GK	(Argentina) Serapio Acosta
DF	(Argentina) Zenón Díaz
DF	(Argentina) Ignacio Rotta
MF	(Argentina) Juan Díaz
MF	(Argentina) Alberto Ledesma
MF	(Argentina) Pablo F. Molina
FW	(Argentina) Federico Flynn
FW	(Argentina) Antonio Blanco
FW	(Argentina) Juan Enrique Hayes
FW	(Argentina) Ennis Hayes
FW	(Argentina) Fidel Ramìrez
