= History of football in Argentina (1867–1899) =

- Native name: Historia del fútbol en Argentina (1867–1899)
- Date: 1867–1899
- Venue: Various
- Location: Argentina
- Theme: Football in Argentina
- Cause: Introduction and development of the sport
- Organised by: Argentine Football Association, others

Association football was introduced to Argentina in the latter half of the 19th century by British immigrants in Buenos Aires, who established the first clubs in the country before the sport spread to other cities.

The practice of football around the country was strongly encouraged by pioneers Thomas Hogg, who participated in the first football match and was a founding member of the Buenos Aires Football Club, the first in South America, and later by Alexander Watson Hutton, who taught the sport at several educational institutions, including the Buenos Aires English High School, which he founded in 1884. The institution saw the birth of Alumni Athletic Club, which would become the most successful team of the era and is considered the first great team in the country. Despite being dissolved in 1913, its 22 titles place Alumni among the most successful teams in the history of Argentine football.

The Argentine league, Primera División, was first held in 1891, making it the sixth recognised competition of a FIFA member. and the first outside the British Isles. The Argentine Football Association (AFA) was formed in 1893 and still governs the practise of organised football in Argentina.

== Background: contextual significance ==
Recovering from an oppressive dictatorship by governor of Buenos Aires Juan Manuel de Rosas who had ruled from 1829 to 1852, Argentine leaders aspired to reconstruct their nation's reputation as a symbol of progress and democracy, according to they had in the San Nicolás Agreement in 1852. Following that, Argentina began its constitutional organization with the enaction of the first National Constitution in 1853, although Buenos Aires remained separate from the Confederation until 1861.

Domingo Faustino Sarmiento, a highly influential intellectual and former president of Argentina, argued in favour of emulating the path taken by Western Europe and the United States.

The country, at that time, was presided over by Bartolomé Mitre and was engaged in a war with Paraguay (known as "War of the Triple Alliance", 1864–70).

By 1867, there was a large British community in Buenos Aires. Most of them had established themselves in Argentina coming from the United Kingdom as managers and workers of the British-owned railway companies that operated in Argentina. British citizens founded social and sports clubs where they could practise their sports, such as bowls, cricket, football, golf, horse riding, rugby union and tennis amongst others.

== The birth of football at BACC and BAFC ==
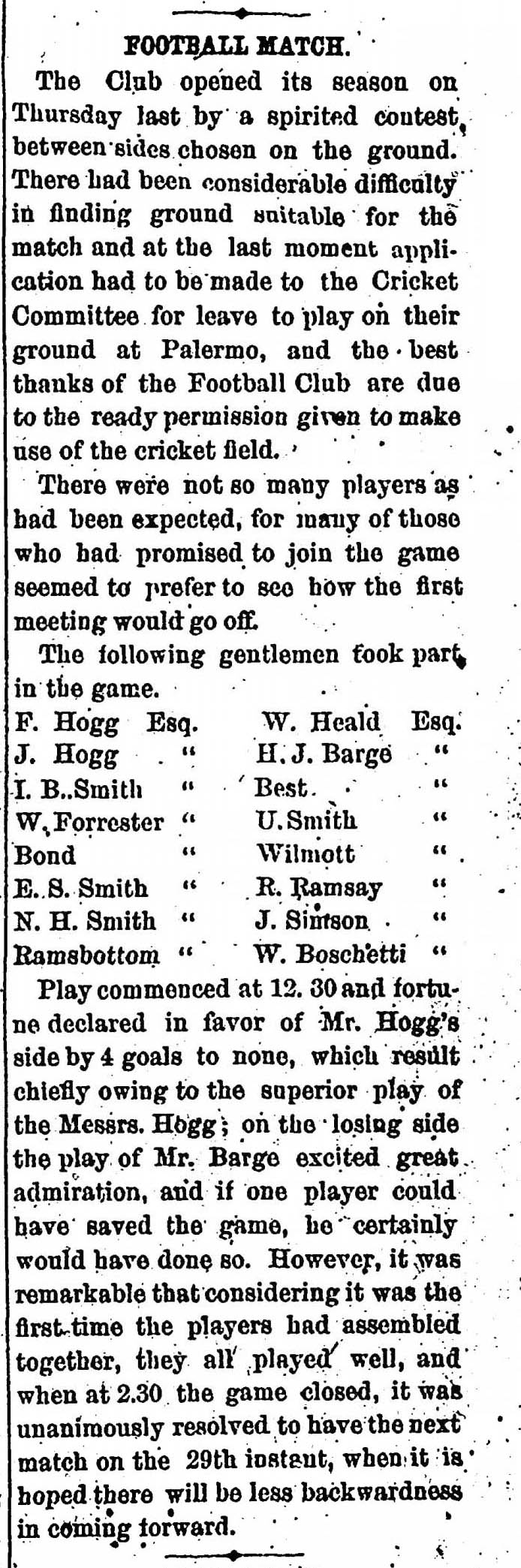
The first football match played in Argentina, as covered by The Standard, June 1867

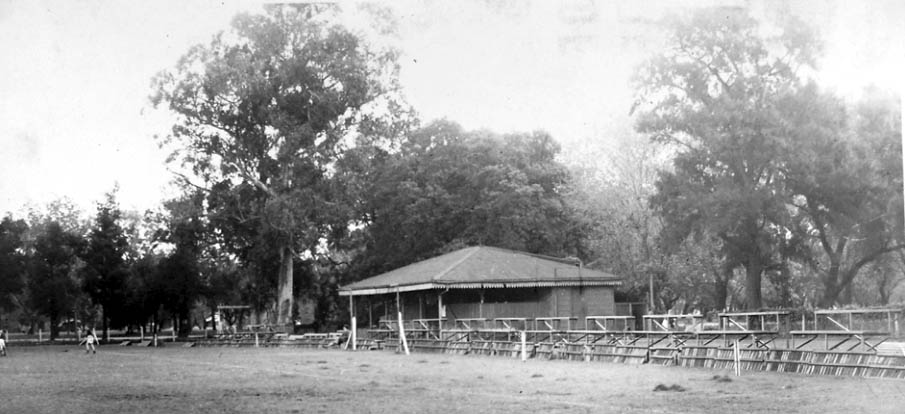
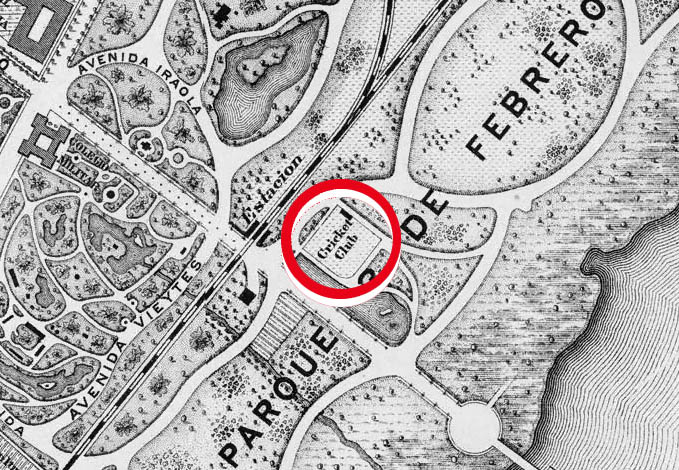
The BACC ground in Palermo (left) held the first football match on 20 June 1867; at right, location of the field from an 1895 map

Two English immigrants, Thomas and James Hogg, organized a meeting on 9 May 1867 in Buenos Aires where the Buenos Aires Football Club was founded. The club was given permission by the Buenos Aires Cricket Club to make use of its cricket field in Parque Tres de Febrero in Palermo, Buenos Aires, on the site now occupied by the Galileo Galilei planetarium. The first recorded football match in Argentina took place on this pitch on 20 June 1867, being covered by English language daily newspaper The Standard. This newspaper, published in Argentina, was the first one to cover football matches in the country. That first match, originally scheduled for May 25 in La Boca, had to be postponed due to bad weather.

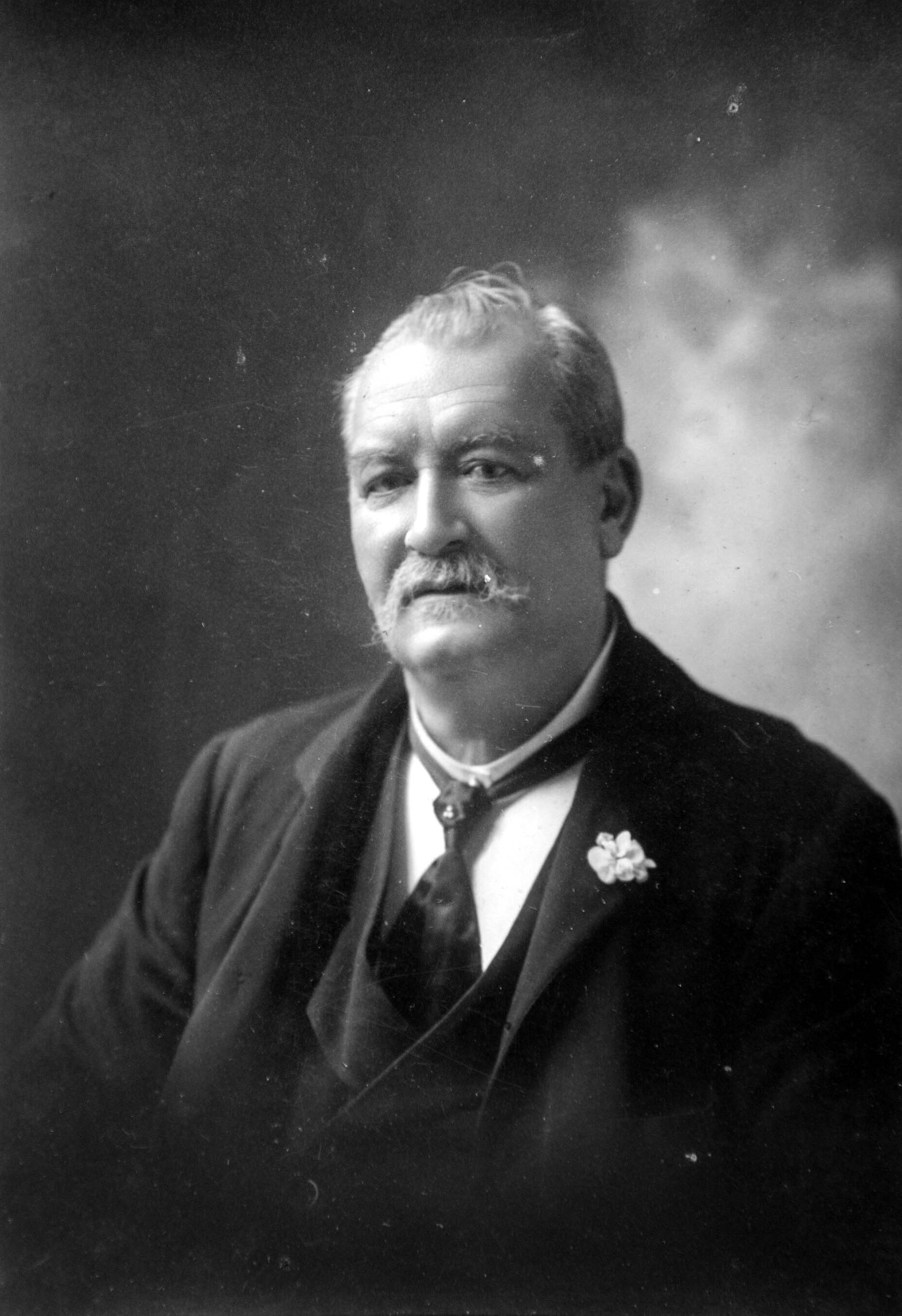
Thomas Hogg played in the first football match in Argentina, and was one of the founders of Buenos Aires FC, the first club of Argentina

The match started at 12.30 and was played between two teams of British merchants, the White Caps and the Red Caps. (In the 19th century, it was common practice for teams to be distinguished by caps rather than shirts). The teams consisted of eight players each as the organisers were unable to find more players for the match. The line-ups were: Thomas Hogg, James Hogg, William Forrester, T. B. Smith, J. W. Bond, E. S. Smith, J. Rabsbottom and N. H. Smith (one team); William Heald, T. R. Best, U. Smith, H. J. Barge, H. Willmont, R. M. Ramsay, J. Simpson and W. Boschetti (second team). The team led by Hogg won 4–0, according to The Standard newspaper published on June 23. The match played was a blend of both association and rugby footballs, with no goals on the field. The use of hands was also allowed.

With the separation of the regulations still blurred between football and rugby, what is not clear is what was played in that founding match. As football as it is known would definitively begin to be played in England five years later, in 1872, so it is likely that that original experiment of those intrepid boys –"the rules of the English Association with slight modifications"– was a mixture of both games.

Perhaps because of the War of the Triple Alliance was still in progress (it ended in 1870), or perhaps because the embryo of football wasn't developing quickly, the "Grandfather of Argentine football", Thomas Hogg, stated to The Standard: "This game will take a long time to spread even among the British residents themselves, although we must insist because it is the best, easiest, and cheapest pastime for middle-class youth and the people." ... "The native friends who play cricket with us were offended when we invited them to join the Buenos Aires Football Club, and a militia officer named Gallino declared that he hadn't gone mad to play football since it could cost him his immediate discharge from the army."

The yellow fever epidemic that ravaged the Argentine capital in 1871 was an obstacle to the development of football in the country. In the interim, between 1870 and April 25, 1873, the BAFC suspended its activities until it was re-established with the same name and presided over by Hogg. The club played a few more matches until 1881, when it finally disappeared.

== British influence (1880–1899) ==
The first chronicle of a football match written in Spanish was published by local newspaper El Nacional on September 11, 1880. The chronicle referred to a "foot-ball" match played in a cricket field in Montevideo between an Uruguayan-Argentine combined vs a British team. The attendance was estimated in 1,000 people. Nevertheless, it is unclear what form of "football" was played due to the number of players on the field (15 per side).

The first football match played between teams from different clubs was in May 1880, when the BAFC played vs Zingari Cricket Club at the BACC Ground. Both clubs were the only institutions that practised football, with no matches of clubs registered outside Buenos Aires.

In November 1880, Gimnasia y Esgrima de Buenos Aires was established. Although the club is no longer affiliated to AFA, GEBA is the oldest club that still practises football in Argentina. Its internal competitions were contested by more than 150 teams as of 2011.

In the city of Córdoba, Córdoba A.C. was established in April 1882, being the oldest football club in the province. Nevertheless, the club abandoned football after the sports became professional in 1931, focusing on rugby union, which had been added as sport in 1898.

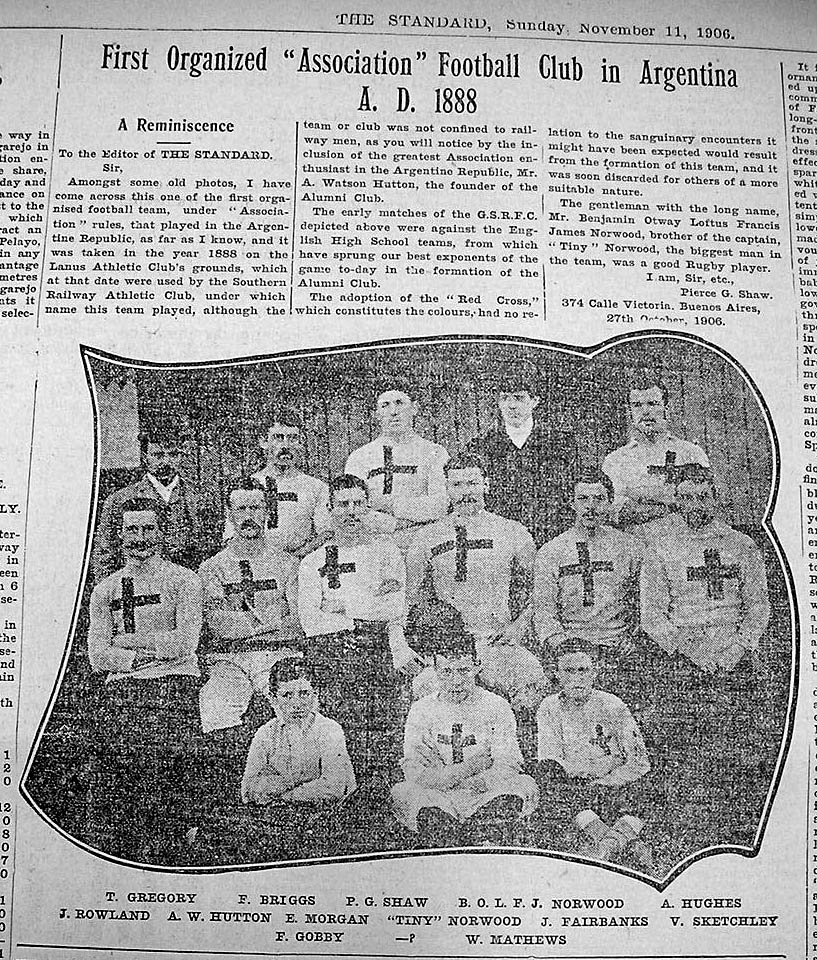
Southern Railway A.C. (white shirt with a red cross), with Alexander Watson Hutton as one of its players, one of the teams that played the first match under the association rules in 1887–88

The first match played exclusively under the rules of association football was held in the Lanús A.C. Field in 1887 (Note: Football historian Carlos Yametti set the date on 24 June 1887, while The Standard, in a chronicle published in 1906, stated the match was played in 1888.) between the "Southern Railway Athletic Club" (established by employees of the Buenos Aires Great Southern Railway or Ferrocarril del Sud in 1885 and based in Lomas de Zamora) and the BAFC (not to be confused with the team founded by the Hogg brothers) (Note: The origin of this BAFC is unclear so the original club had been disestablished in 1881. It is known that other clubs under the same name existed, although there are few records of their existences and activities.), which won the match 2–0. The game was covered by The Standard. The chronicle also named Alexander Watson Hutton as one of the BAGSAC players. The early matches of the team, in fact, were against Buenos Aires English High School. BAFC and SRAC played another match at the Flores Old Ground in June 1888, also won by BAFC 2–0.

On July 20, 1888, the first interprovincial match was held in Plaza Jewell when Rosario A.C. and BAFC tied 2–2. The first international club match was played on August 15 the same year at the Montevideo Cricket Club field between combined teams of Buenos Aires and Montevideo. The visitor team won 3–1. Both teams played another match in Buenos Aires on 8 June 1890 at Hurlingham Club, won again by Buenos Aires 2–1. It was the first international club match held in Argentina.

In these early days of football in Argentina, nearly all of the players and officials were expatriate Britons or of British extraction and some of the oldest football clubs in Argentina like Rosario A.C. (1867), Quilmes (1887), Rosario Central (1889), Lomas A.C. (1891), Flores A.C. (1893), Lobos A.C. (1892), Porteño A.C. (1895) Belgrano A.C. (1896), Banfield (1896), Alumni A.C. (1898), and Newell's Old Boys (1903), were all founded by British expatriates.

Unlike other British-origin institutions of that time, football was practised at Quilmes A.C. since its inception, being the third oldest football club currently affiliated to AFA (after Club Mercedes, established in 1875 and Gimnasia y Esgrima La Plata (established in June 1887). (Note: Until 2022, Gimnasia y Esgrima LP was the oldest football club affiliated to AFA. That changed when Mercedes affiliated to the association, becoming the oldest football club playing in official competitions.)

The British influence in the creation of football clubs extended to British-owned railway companies in Argentina, whose employees also established several clubs to practise the sport. Some examples ar Buenos Aires and Rosario Railway (1888), Rosario Central (1889), Buenos Aires al Pacífico (1892), Ferro Carril Oeste (1904), Talleres de Remedios de Escalada (1906), Central Córdoba de Rosario (1906), Central Argentino (Santiago del Estero, 1913), and Ferrocarril Midland (1914), among others.

== First league and official competitions (1891) ==
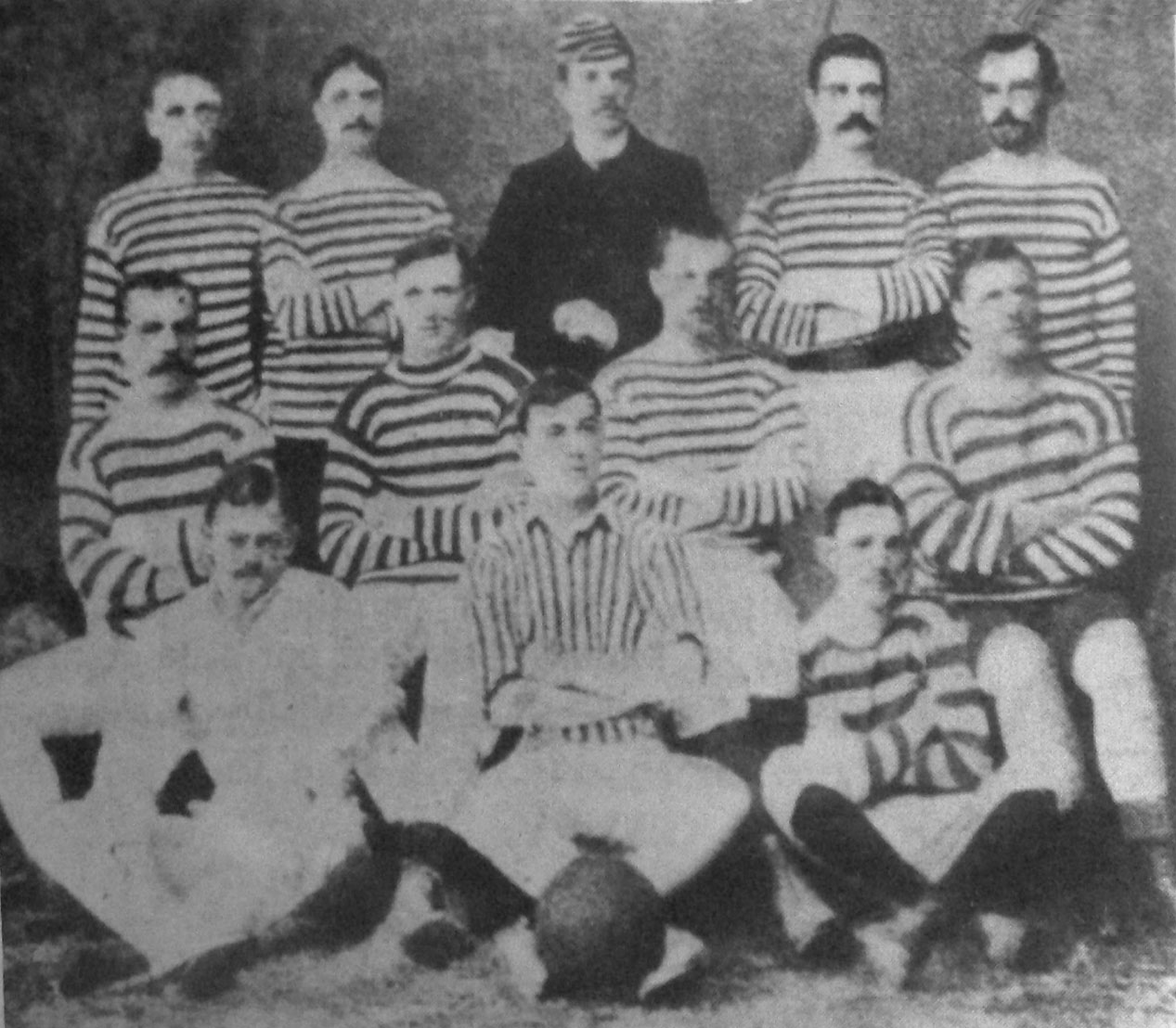
St. Andrew's, first Argentine co-champion in 1891

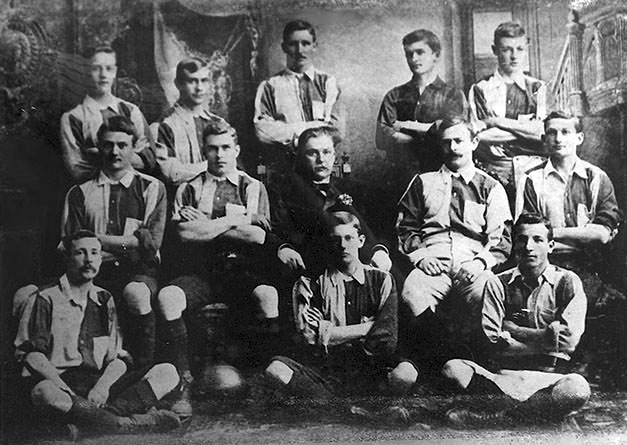
Lomas, the first team to won 6 consecutive titles

In 1891, the "Association Argentine Football League" was established by F.L. Wooley, with Alex Lamont of St. Andrew's Scots School as one of its members. The AAFL was the first football league outside of the British Isles. The inaugural season of Primera División was contested by five clubs, with St. Andrew's and Old Caledonians becoming the first Argentine champions ever.

After one year of hiatus, a new league with the same name as its predecessor was formed on 21 February 1893 by Alexander Watson Hutton, the Argentine Football Association (AFA). The newly created body resumed the organisation of Primera División championships that same year, which cemented Primera División as one of the oldest football competitions in the world.

== Lomas, the first great team (1893–1898) ==
During those first years of domestic competitions, Lomas A.C. won six consecutive league titles from 1893 to 1898, being regarded as the first big team in Argentina.

Lomas finished unbeaten the 1893 and 1894 seasons, while in 1897 Lomas set a record of 55 goals scored and only 5 conceded, winning 11 out of 12 matches. Nevertheless, Lomas abandoned the practise of football in 1909, focusing on other sports such as cricket and rugby.

== First "creole" clubs (1890s) ==
Most of the early clubs had a policy of excluding the local creole population. The backlash against this policy at Quilmes A.C. resulted in the formation of Argentino de Quilmes in 1899, recognised as the first creole club in Argentina, who even chose to use the national colors (light blue and white) in their shirt to highlight their sense of belonging. Estudiantes de Buenos Aires had been established one year before by Argentine people although the first president of the club was Paddy McCarthy, an Irish immigrant.

Another club with non-British origins was Sociedad Sportiva Argentina, a multi-sport institution established in September 1899 that would become the main sports club of Argentina in the 1910s. It is considered a predecessor of the Argentine Olympic Committee. One of the founders of La Sportiva was then-President of Argentina Julio Argentino Roca. Sociedad Sportiva closed its doors in 1914, when the Argentine Army took over the club's stadium after concession ended. The land would be later expropriated and transferred to the Army.

The name "Argentino" or "Argentinos" has remained popular in Argentine football. Some examples are Argentino de Quilmes, Argentino de Rosario, Liberal Argentino, and most notably, Argentinos Juniors.

== Football in Rosario ==
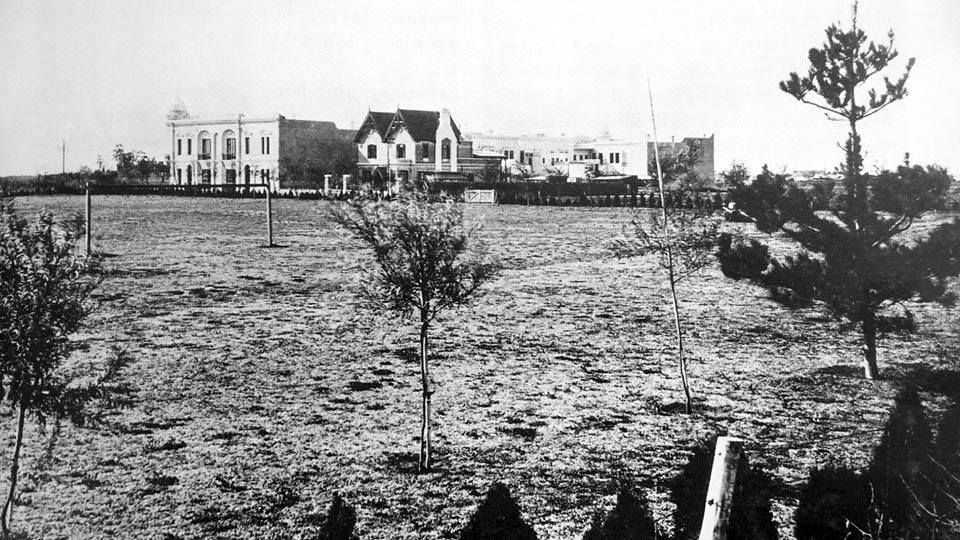
Rosario A.C. sports field in 1893. The institution, established 1867, is the oldest in the city and a pioneer in sports

The city of Rosario has a crucial importance in the development of football outside Buenos Aires. In 1888 the city hosted the first interprovincial match at Plaza Jewell between Rosario A.C. and Buenos Aires F.C. In 1896, the first football competition under the association rules was organised. It was contested by onlye three teams, Rosario A.C., Central Argentine Railway A.C., and the British school presided by Mr. Robb.

In May 1897 the "Rosario Association Football League", the first football league in the city, was established at the St. Bartholomew's School. Founding members were Central Argentine Railway A.C., Córdoba and Rosario Railway A.C., Rosario A.C., and Robb's School (Past and Presents). G. Robb was chosen president of the league, which first championship (organised that same year and played under a round-robin tournament format) was won by Rosario A.C.

== Stadiums ==
During the early years of football in Argentina, some of the most representative stadiums were:

=== Buenos Aires C.C. ===
The Buenos Aires Cricket Club Ground, although not a football-specific stadium, was used by BACC cricketers to play the first match in 1867. It was located in the neighborhood of Palermo, on the same site where the Galileo Galilei Planetarium stands nowadays. In 1948, the facilities of the BACC (including the stadium) were destroyed by fire (some sources affirm it was intentional although those versions could never be confirmed).

=== Plaza Jewell ===
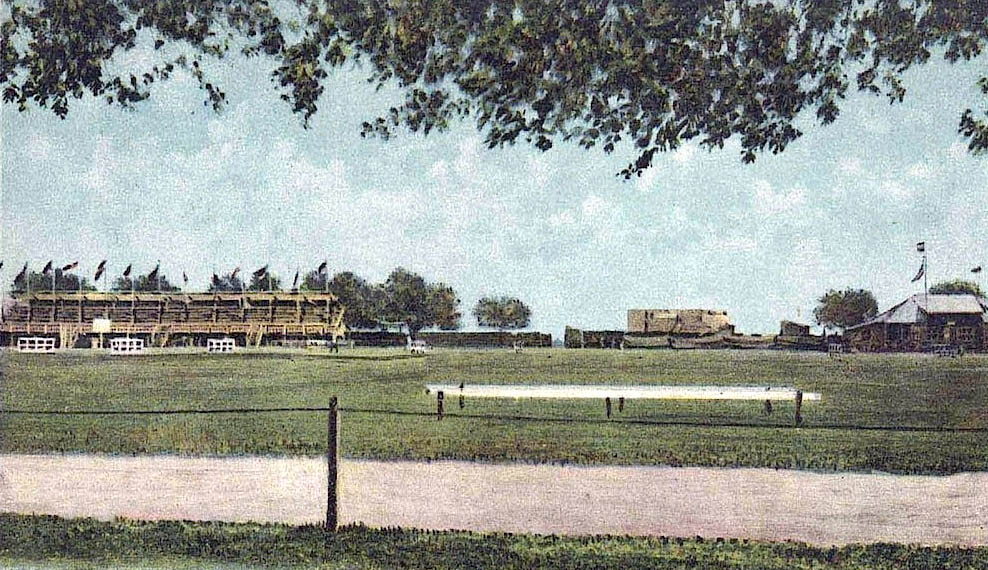
Plaza Jewell, opened in 1889, is the oldest sports field in Argentina

Plaza Jewell (1889–1916): owned by Club Atlético del Rosario and opened in 1889, it is the oldest sports ground in Argentina.

The field hosted most of the matches of the first football league in Rosario, conducted in 1887 and won by the local club.

Football was played at Plaza Jewell until 1916, when the club abandoned the practise of the sport. Since CAR left football, Plaza Jewell has been used for rugby exclusively.

=== Flores ===
Flores Old Ground, located in the barrio of Caballito, just behind the Buenos Aires Western Railway freight sheds, hosted several matches during the period Flores A.C. was active.

The venue is notable for having held the first Primera División final in 1891, where St. Andrew's defeated Old Caledonians 3–1, being awarded medals although both teams had been declared champions by the Association. In 1907 Flores A.C. sold its facilities to neighbor club Ferro Carril Oeste and the stadium was later demolished.

== See also ==
- History of football in Argentina (1900–1919)
- Football in Argentina
