= Sportivo Villa Urquiza =

- Full name: Club Sportivo Villa Urquiza
- Founded: 1 Jul 1916
- Dissolved: 1925; 101 years ago (merged to General San Martín)
- Ground: Mendoza and Freire, Belgrano
- League: Primera División
- 1925: 8th. (Note: As "General San Martín", after the merger.)
colours

Club Sportivo Villa Urquiza was an Argentine football club located in the Villa Urquiza district of Buenos Aires. The club, founded in 1916, had a brief stint in the top division of Argentine football, Primera División, in mid 1920s, before merging to Club San Martín in 1925.

Villa Urquiza was one of the several football teams based on the north side of Buenos Aires that participated in competitions organised by the Argentine Football Association (AFA), along with Alumni, Platense, Platense II, Kimberley (1912–15), and Palermo (1925–26).

== History ==
The club was founded on July 1, 1916 in Villa Urquiza, where it took its name from. Its first field was on Mariano Acha street, between Mendoza and Juramento, in the same neighborhood. That field had been occupied from Club Everest, another football team.

The club affiliated to the Argentine Football Association in 1917 to play in Segunda División, being promoted to División Intermedia (the second division by then) in 1919, after the competition was annulled and the AFA promoted teams placed first in each zone at the moment of the cancellation. As a similar situation happened in 1922, Villa Urquiza was benefited with the same procedure, being promoted to the top division. In 1919, Villa Urquiza played its first major competition, the Copa de Competencia Jockey Club, contested by teams from Primera and Segunda División. The team advanced to quarter finals after eliminating Club San Martín and El Porvenir, but lost to Progresista.

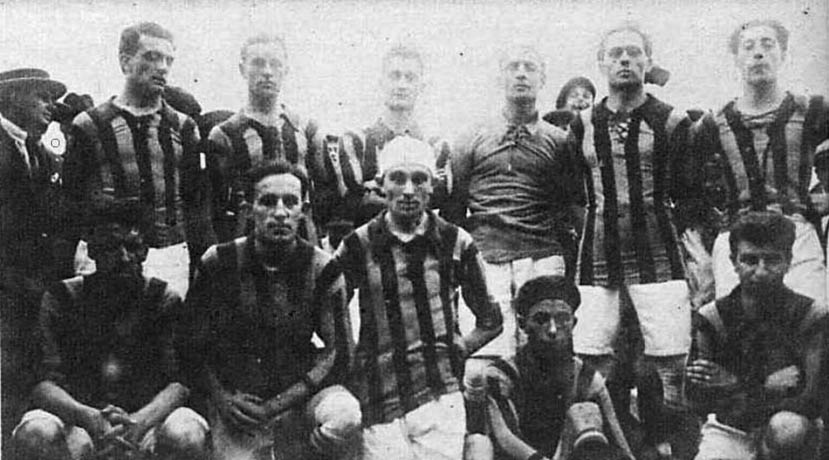
Team of 1922 that played in División Intermedia. That same year the club promoted to Primera División

Villa Urquiza debuted in Primera División in the 1923 season v Club Atlético Palermo on March, 11. During that season, Sportivo Villa Urquiza played its home games at the field owned by "Deustcher Fussball Verein", a club founded on August 11, 1922, by German descendants in Argentina. The venue was located on Mendoza and Freire streets, Belgrano neighborhood. Apart from Villa Urquiza, other clubs used to rent that stadium, such as Platense II (founded by dissident member of the original C.A. Platense, and C.A. Palermo.

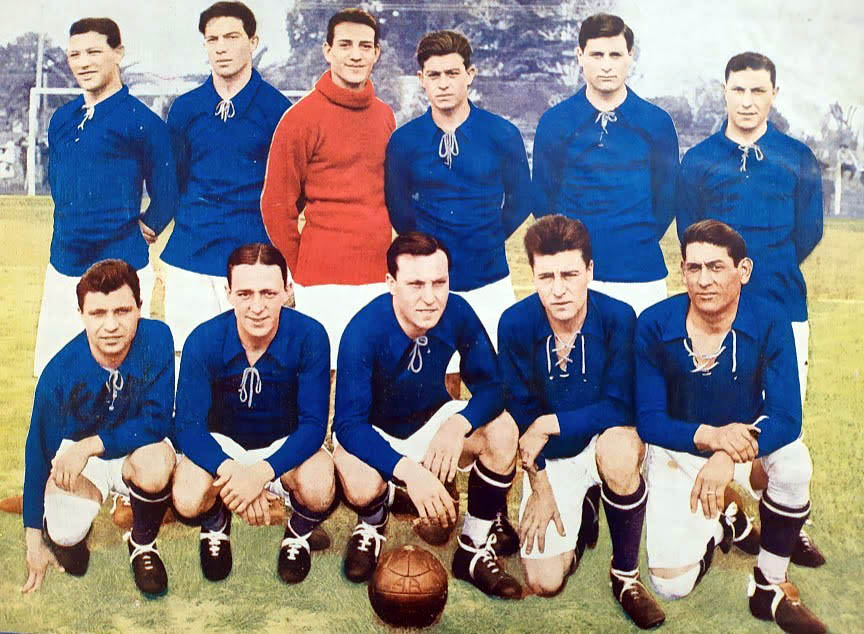
In 1925, SVU merged to C.A. General San Martín (pictured, a team of 1926), which remained in official AFA competitions until 1935

In 1924, Villa Urquiza moved to the General San Martín district of the homonymous partido in Greater Buenos Aires. One year later, the club merged to Club General San Martín, an institution founded on October 12, 1913 that wore blue shirts with white stripes. The last match in Primera División under the "Villa Urquiza" name was on September 20 v Universal, debuting as "General San Martín" on October 4 v Colegiales. Its stadium was on Mitre and Balcarce streets in San Martín.

General San Martín participated in the 1925 edition of Copa Jockey Club, where it lost to Temperley in quarter finals. After the 1926 season, dissident Asociación Amateurs de Football merged to AFA. That restructuring caused 11 teams were relegated, with San Martín among them. In 1934 the team returned to Primera to play in the official league (AFA) that remained amateur after the main clubs established professional Liga Argentina de Football in 1931. That was the last season of San Martín in Primera after both leagues, AFA and LAF, merged in 1935. That same year the club disaffiliated and never returned to official competitions.

== Rivalries ==
Villa Urquiza's main rival was Sportivo Coghlan (a club from the homonymous district which was also affiliated to AFA and played in lower divisions).
