= 1929 in Argentine football =

Football in Argentina
- Season: 1929

1929 saw the 35 teams that formed the Primera División divided into two groups. The top 2 of each group qualified for the final stages of the tournament, which was eventually won by Gimnasia y Esgrima (LP).

The season was marred by mass abandonment of games, defending Argentine champion Huracán withdrew from 8 of its fixtures leaving them to finish in 14th place in the group. Several other teams withdrew from multiple games. Abandonments of games, discontinuations, and withdrawals were quite common in these early seasons (cf., for instance, the second half of the 1930 season).

The Argentina national team won a new edition of Copa América.

== Primera División ==
Colegiales returned to the first division after winning the Primera B championship last year.

=== Group A ===
Pos	Team	Pts	G	W	D	L	Gf	Ga	Gd
1	Gimnasia y Esgrima (LP)	28	17	14	0	3	33	11	+22
2	River Plate	27	17	12	3	2	28	11	+17
3	Lanús	24	17	8	8	1	31	17	+14
4	Racing Club	24	17	10	4	3	24	17	+7
5	Almagro	21	17	8	5	4	19	18	+1
6	Talleres (BA)	19	17	7	5	5	16	13	+3
7	San Fernando	17	17	6	5	6	31	20	+11
8	Colegiales	17	17	5	7	5	28	28	0
9	El Porvenir	17	17	7	3	7	19	26	-7
10	Estudiantes (LP)	16	17	7	2	8	32	20	+12
11	Tigre	15	17	5	5	7	28	23	+5
12	Argentino del Sud	15	17	6	3	8	14	24	-10
13	Banfield	14	17	5	4	8	18	23	-5
14	Huracán	13	17	6	1	10	26	11	+15
15	Atlanta	11	17	4	3	10	10	24	-14
16	San Isidro	9	17	3	3	11	14	36	-22
17	Estudiantes (BA)	8	17	2	4	11	8	41	-33
18	Platense	7	17	3	1	13	7	23	-16

=== Group B ===
Pos	Team	Pts	G	W	D	L	Gf	Ga	Gd
1	Boca Juniors	27	16	13	1	2	31	11	+20
2	San Lorenzo	27	16	12	3	1	42	15	+27
3	Independiente	20	16	7	6	3	38	18	+20
4	Estudiantil Porteño	20	16	8	4	4	26	21	+5
5	Chacarita Juniors	20	16	8	4	4	23	20	+3
6	Vélez Sarsfield	20	16	9	2	5	23	21	+2
7	Argentinos Juniors	15	16	5	5	6	16	22	-6
8	Barracas Central	15	16	7	1	8	16	30	-14
9	Sportivo Palermo	14	16	6	2	8	14	21	-7
10	Quilmes	14	16	6	2	8	8	26	-18
11	Defensores de Belgrano	12	16	4	4	8	12	18	-6
12	Sportivo Buenos Aires	12	16	4	4	8	20	19	+1
13	Excursionistas	12	16	5	2	9	20	33	-13
14	Argentino de Quilmes	11	16	4	3	9	16	17	-1
15	Argentino de Banfield	11	16	3	5	8	21	28	-7
16	Ferro Carril Oeste	10	16	2	6	8	23	25	-2
17	Sportivo Barracas	10	16	3	4	9	13	17	-4

As Boca Juniors and San Lorenzo finished level on points, they needed a playoff to decide which team went to the final and which to the 3rd/4th place playoff.

==== Playoff ====
19 January 1930

Boca Juniors	2-2	San Lorenzo
Kuko; Evaristo		D. García; Arrieta

River Plate

26 January 1930

Boca Juniors	2-2	San Lorenzo
Evaristo; Muttis		D. García; Foresto

Racing Club

2 February 1930

Boca Juniors	3-1	San Lorenzo
Evaristo (2); Moreyras	Report	Carricaberry

River Plate

==== Third place ====
9 February 1930

River Plate	wp/lp	San Lorenzo
	Report

=== Final ===
9 February 1930

Gimnasia y Esgrima (LP)	2-1	Boca Juniors
Maleanni 62', 70'	Report	Di Gianno (o.g.) 30'

River Plate

== Lower divisions ==
=== Primera B ===
- Champion: Honor y Patria (Bernal)

=== Primera C ===
- Champion: Gimnasia y Esgrima (Lanús)

== Argentina national team ==
Argentina won its 4th. Copa América, hosted at home. The team also won other minor championships such as Copa Cámara de Diputados Argentina and Copa Centro Automovilístico Uruguayo but lost the Copa Lipton and Copa Newton to Uruguay.

=== Copa Lipton ===
28 September 1929

Argentina	0-0	Uruguay
	Report

Buenos Aires

=== Copa Newton ===
20 September 1929

Argentina	1-2	Uruguay
	Report

Montevideo

=== Copa América ===
3 November 1929

Argentina	3-0	Peru
Peucelle 27'; Zumelzú 38', 58'

Gasómetro de Boedo

10 November 1929

Argentina	4-1	Paraguay
Evaristo 7'; M. Ferreira 24', 48'; Cherro 50'		Domínguez 56'

Gasómetro de Boedo

17 November 1929

Argentina	2-0	Uruguay
M. Ferreira 14'; Evaristo 77'	Report

Gasómetro de Boedo
