= División de Honor B =

División de Honor B may refer to:

- División de Plata de Balonmano, the second-level handball league in Spain
- División de Honor B de Rugby, the second Spanish league competition for rugby union clubs

== See also ==
- División de Honor (disambiguation)
