= Instituto Americano =

Instituto Americano de Adrogué
- Adrogué, Greater Buenos Aires; Argentina

Information
- Type: Private
- Opened: 1890
- Closed: 1929

Instituto Americano de Adrogué was an Argentine educational establishment, co-founded by Ricardo Monner Sans.

== History ==
Its director was Ricardo Monner Sans, born in Barcelona. In the early 1894, he was entrusted with the leadership of the American Institute of Adrogué, a position he served for six years. Monner Sans had been professor of Castilian literature in the Colegio Nacional de Buenos Aires.

In 1929, the national government took over the educational establishment, turning it into a free education school, changing the name to "Colegio Nacional Almirante Brown", (National College of Almirante Brown).

== Football club ==
The school also had a football team, in the early 1900s, that participated in the second and third division championships organised by the Argentine Football Association. On September 8, 1908, Instituto Americano played the final of the Copa de Competencia Adolfo Bullrich against Atlanta, which lost by 2-0. Instituto would later play some of the most popular teams of Argentina, such as River Plate and Boca Juniors. In 1909, Instituto Americano played the Copa de Competencia Jockey Club final v. Boca Juniors in Adrogué, won by the Xeneizes by 3-2.

Instituto Americano's most famous footballer was Roberto González Escarrá.

In 1910, Instituto Americano won its only league title, the third division championship.
