= Club Honor y Patria =

Argentine football club

Honor y Patria
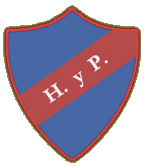
- Full name: Club Honor y Patria
- Nickname: Isleños
- Founded: 1 May 1911
- Dissolved: c. 1938
- Ground: Crámer and Tacuarí, Bernal, Buenos Aires
- League: Primera B
- 1934: 10°
Home colours

Club Honor y Patria was an Argentine football club sited in Bernal, Greater Buenos Aires. The institution was the first club from that city to have played in Primera División, the first level of Argentine football league system, although it lasted only one season in the division.

Other clubs from Bernal (such as Club Bernal and Estudiantes) played at intermediate divisions.

== History ==
The club was established on May 1, 1911, with a football team formed by Italian immigrants that had arrived to Bernal from La Boca and nicknamed los Isleños. The club had its field in the intersection of Tacuarí and Cramer streets, adopting the blue and red as its colors, playing with a vertical stripes jersey.

In 1922 Honor y Patria registered with Asociación Amateurs de Football, a dissident body that had been established in 1919 to organise its own championships.

In 1926, Honor y Patria won its first official title, División Intermedia (Second Division) championship after beating San Telmo in a three games series. The team had finished 1st of Section B, with 14 victories over 16 games played while San Telmo had finished 1st of Section A, with a record of 15–18. On January 16, 1927, Honor y Patria defeated San Telmo by 2–1 in the third game played at River Plate stadium, after the previous matches ended in a tie (1–1 and 0–0). The line-up that won the championship was: Tauziet; J.Denda, González; Rizzone, Devescui, Aragón; N. Denda, Tizano, Olivari, Pendola, Figueroa. González scored both goals for Honor y Patria.

"The victory achieved by Club Honor y Patria of Bernal v. San Telmo in the match played at River Plate on Sunday the 16th, was well deserved. Yes, dear readers, I consider and affirm that the eleven of Club Honor y Patria is a better team -in terms of technique and sportsmanship- than San Telmo due to the first matches ended in a tie only because the team from Bernal's bad luck to score a goal..."

— El Gráfico #398, 19 Jan 1927

Nevertheless, the squad did not promote to Primera División due to both associations merged in 1927. Therefore, Honor y Patria remained in the second division until 1929 when the team achieved promotion to Primera after winning the championship. The team finished with 31 points in 20 games played, with 12 wins, 7 draws and only 1 loss. The squad scored 34 goals and conceded 14. The line-up v. Liberal Argentino in the last fixture of the tournament was: E. Tomero; V. González, E.G allini; R. Aragón, D. Bataglini, J. Figueroa; R. Calichio, J. Olivari, J.R. Angelini, A. Scotti, D.Tizzano.

Honor y Patria made a very poor campaign in its first season in Primera, being relegated (along with Club Argentino del Sud) after finishing 35 of 36 teams. The team only won 4 games over 35 played, with 30 goals scored and 91 conceded, with some smashing losses to Quilmes (0–6), River Plate (0–5), Racing (1–4), Sportivo Buenos Aires (1–6) and Gimnasia y Esgrima (LP) (1–5). However, the largest defeat came at the hands of Boca Juniors which smashed Honor y Patria by 9–1 on March 29, 1931, with 7 goals scored by Roberto Cherro, becoming the first and only Boca Juniors played to have scored that number of goals in a single match.

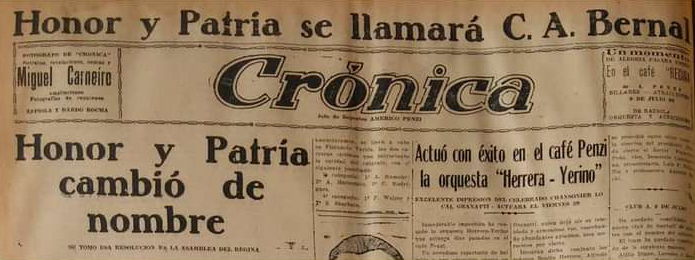
Front page of the Crónica newspaper announcing the name change of the Club in 1932.

After finishing last in the 1934 Primera B championship, Honor y Patria disaffiliated from the Association. (Note: The 1935 AFA Annual Report and Balance did not include Honor y Patria in its list of affiliated clubs.) It is believed that the club folded soon after.

== Honours ==
- División Intermedia (1): 1926 AAm
- Primera B (1): 1929 (Note: There was another "Club Honor y Patria" sited in Floresta, Buenos Aires and founded in 1905, that won the 1914 Primera B title although it was later defeated by San Lorenzo de Almagro by 3–0 and did not promote to Primera División. Honor y Patria from Floresta (disestablished in 1920) has been often confused with Club Honor y Patria from Bernal.)
