= Copa de Competencia La Nación =

Copa de Competencia "La Nación"
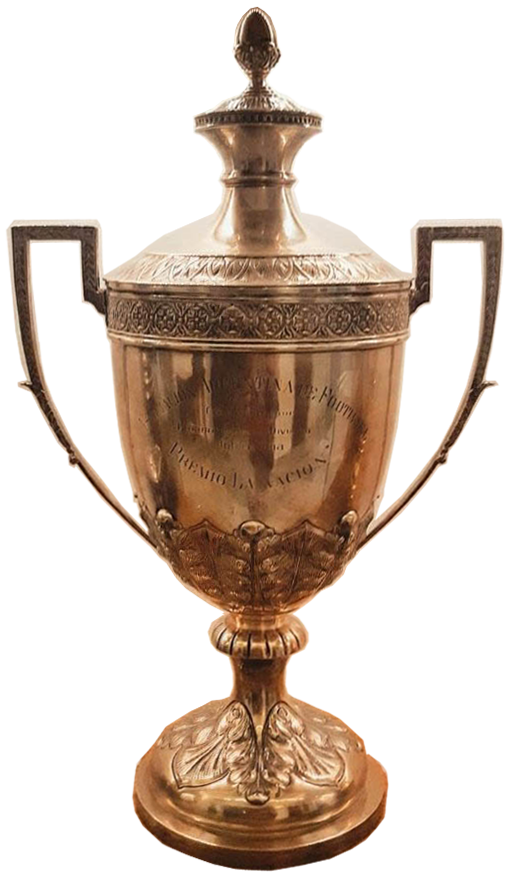
- The trophy awarded to champions
- Organiser(s): FAF
- Founded: 1913
- Abolished: 1914; 112 years ago
- Region: Argentina
- Teams: 26
- Last champions: Independiente (1914)
- Most championships: Rosario Central; Independiente (1 title each)

The Copa de Competencia "La Nación" (also called "Concurso por Eliminación") was an official Argentine football cup competition organized by dissident "Federación Argentina de Football" (FAF), being first held in 1913. The tournament only had two editions, the last in 1914.

The trophy took its name from local newspaper La Nación, that donated the cup for the competition. The first edition was played by 22 teams from first and second divisions competing in a single knock-out format. The "Federación Rosarina de Football" (a dissident body from the Liga Rosarina) qualified two teams to semifinal round.

The second edition increased the number of teams to 26 with no clubs from Rosario taking part of the competition before the regional body had been dissolved. Independiente and Argentino de Quilmes qualified to play the final but Argentino disafilliated from the FAF to join official body Asociación Argentina de Football shortly before the final match. Therefore, the association crowned Independiente as champion of the tournament.

== Champions ==
Ed.	Year	Champion	Score	Runner-up	Venue	City
1	1913	Rosario Central	3–2	Argentino (Q)	GEBA	Buenos Aires
2	1914	Independiente (Note: Recognized as champion due to the other finalist, Argentino de Quilmes, had disjoined the FAF.)	(not held)	Argentino (Q)	–	
