= 1914 in Argentine football =

Football in Argentina
- Season: 1914

Men's football
- Primera División: Racing Club; Porteño (FAF)
- Intermedia: Honor y Patria (AFA); Def. Belgrano (FAF)
- Segunda División: San Lorenzo (AFA); Tigre Juniors (FAF)
- Tercera División: Lib. Unidos (AFA); Vélez Sársfield (FAF)
- Copa de Competencia: River Plate

1914 in Argentine football saw Racing Club win its second consecutive Primera División title, apart from winning its second successive Copa Ibarguren. Porteño won the dissident FAF championship, the last tournament before both leagues AFA and FAF reunified. River Plate won domestic Copa de Competencia Jockey Club and international Copa de Honor Cousenier.

In international football Argentina won the Copa Premier Honor Argentino against Uruguay. Argentina also lost the first ever competitive game against Brazil and played friendlies against Exeter City of England and Torino F.C. of Italy.

== Primera División ==
=== Asociación Argentina de Football - Copa Campeonato ===
Huracán made its debut in Primera División, while Ferrocarril Sud was dissolved after playing 7 matches.

Pos	Team	Pts	G	W	D	L	Gf	Ga	Gd
1	Racing Club	23	12	11	1	0	42	7	+35
2	Estudiantes (BA)	21	12	10	1	1	34	12	+22
3	Boca Juniors	15	12	5	5	2	19	11	+8
4	Banfield	15	12	7	1	4	16	17	-1
5	River Plate	14	12	6	2	4	15	12	+3
6	Huracán	11	12	4	3	5	25	22	+3
7	Platense	10	12	4	2	6	14	17	-3
8	San Isidro	10	12	2	6	4	10	16	-6
9	Estudiantil Porteño	10	12	3	4	5	14	23	-9
10	Quilmes	10	12	4	2	6	14	24	-10
11	Belgrano AC	8	12	1	6	5	14	20	-6
12	Ferro Carril Oeste	6	12	2	2	8	17	30	-13
13	Comercio	3	12	0	3	9	13	36	-23

=== Federación Argentina de Football ===
Tigre was ejected from the Federation after playing 14 matches while Argentino de Quilmes was disaffiliated after playing 7 games. According to the rules, Floresta had to be relegated but it finally remained in Primera due to the reunification of both leagues Asociación Argentina and Federación Argentina de Football.

Pos	Team	Pts	G	W	D	L	Gf	Ga	Gd
1	Porteño	24	14	10	4	0	46	18	+26
2	Estudiantes (LP)	21	14	9	3	2	31	16	+15
3	Independiente	19	14	7	5	2	27	16	+11
4	Kimberley AC (BA)	12	14	5	2	7	21	39	-18
5	Gimnasia y Esgrima (BA)	11	14	4	3	7	19	20	-1
6	Hispano Argentino	11	14	4	3	7	25	29	-4
7	Atlanta	10	14	4	2	8	21	33	-12
8	Floresta	4	14	1	2	11	11	33	-22

== Lower divisions ==
=== Intermedia ===
- AFA champion: Honor y Patria (Floresta)
- FAF champion: Defensores de Belgrano

=== Segunda División ===
- AFA champion: San Lorenzo
- FAF champion: Tigre Juniors

=== Tercera División ===
- AFA champion: Libertarios Unidos
- FAF champion: Vélez Sársfield

== Domestic cups ==
=== Copa de Competencia Jockey Club ===
- Champion: River Plate

==== Final ====
15 November 1914

River Plate	4-0	Newell's
	Report

Dársena Sur

=== Copa Ibarguren ===
- Champion: Racing Club

==== Final ====
6 December 1914

Racing Club	1-0	Rosario Central
Marcovecchio	Report

Estudiantes (BA)

== International cups ==
=== Tie Cup ===
- Champion: (Argentina) River Plate

==== Final ====
20 December 1914

CA River Plate (Argentina)	1-0	(Uruguay) Bristol FC
Luis Gianetto	Report

Ferro Carril Oeste

River Plate: Carlos Ísola; Arturo Chiappe, Agustín Lanata; Atilio Peruzzi, Cándido García, Alfredo Elli; Roberto Fraga Patrao, Alfredo Martín, Alberto Penney, Luis Gianetto, Juan Sevesi.

== Argentina national team ==
Argentina played their first competitive game against Brazil, a 0-1 loss in the Copa Roca.

=== Titles ===
- Copa Premier Honor Argentino 1914

=== Results ===
Date	Venue	Opponents	Score	Competition	Argentina scorers	Match Report(s)
11 July 1914	Buenos Aires	Exeter City	0 - 0	Friendly
30 August 1914	Montevideo	Uruguay	3 - 2	Copa Premier Honor Uruguayo	Fournol "Calomino", Dannaher
30 August 1914	Buenos Aires	Torino FC	2 - 1	Friendly
13 September 1914	Buenos Aires	Uruguay	2 - 1	Copa Premier Honor Argentino	Gallardo, Lezcano
20 September 1914	Buenos Aires	Brazil	3 - 0	Friendly	Izaguirre (2), Molfino
27 September 1914	Buenos Aires	Brazil	0 - 1	Copa Julio Roca
