= Argentine Primera División de Futsal =

- Founded: 1986; 40 years ago
- Country: Argentina
- Confederation: CONMEBOL
- Number of clubs: 18
- Level on pyramid: 1
- Relegation to: Primera División B
- Domestic cup: Copa Argentina
- International cup: Copa Libertadores
- Current champions: 17 de Agosto (2025)
- Most championships: Pinocho (14)
- Website: Futsal on AFA

The Primera División de Futsal (formerly, División de Honor), is the main futsal league in Argentina. Organised by the Argentine Football Association (AFA), the first championship was held in 1986.

The Argentine futsal league system is made up of four divisions (Primera A to Primera D), with a total of 87 clubs competing in all of them, which also take part of Copa Argentina de Futsal.

This league is the main division of futsal in Argentina, contested by clubs from the provinces of Buenos Aires and Santa Fe. The Argentine league is regarded as one of the main futsal leagues in South America.

== Clubs ==
There are 18 clubs competing in the 2024 season, they are:

| Club | District/Neighborhood | Province |
|---|---|---|
| 17 de Agosto | Villa Pueyrredón | City of Buenos Aires |
| América del Sud | Parque Avellaneda | City of Buenos Aires |
| Atlanta | Villa Crespo | City of Buenos Aires |
| Barracas Central | Barracas | City of Buenos Aires |
| Boca Juniors | La Boca | City of Buenos Aires |
| Camioneros | Villa Real | City of Buenos Aires |
| Ferro Carril Oeste | Caballito | City of Buenos Aires |
| Gimnasia y Esgrima LP | La Plata | Buenos Aires Province |
| Glorias | Tigre | Buenos Aires Province |
| Hebraica | Pilar | Buenos Aires Province |
| Independiente | Avellaneda | Buenos Aires Province |
| Jorge Newbery | Villa Real | City of Buenos Aires |
| Kimberley | Villa Devoto | City of Buenos Aires |
| Nueva Chicago | Mataderos | City of Buenos Aires |
| Pinocho | Villa Urquiza | City of Buenos Aires |
| Racing | Avellaneda | Buenos Aires Province |
| SECLA | Avellaneda | Buenos Aires Province |
| San Lorenzo | Boedo | City of Buenos Aires |

== Champions ==
| Season | Champion |
|---|---|
| 1986 | Rosario Central |
| 1987 | Newell's Old Boys |
| 1988 | Muñiz |
| 1989 | Atlanta |
| 1990 | Atlanta |
| 1991 | River Plate |
| 1992 | Boca Juniors |
| 1993 | Boca Juniors |
| 1994 | Newell's Old Boys |
| 1995 | Deportivo Laferrere |
| 1996 | Atlanta |
| 1997 Apertura | Lugano |
| 1997 Clausura | Boca Juniors |
| 1998 Apertura | Boca Juniors |
| 1998 Clausura | Tigre |
| 1999 Apertura | San Lorenzo |
| 1999 Clausura | San Lorenzo |
| 2000 Apertura | Argentinos Juniors |
| 2000 Clausura | San Lorenzo |
| 2001 Apertura | Franja de Oro |
| 2001 Clausura | San Lorenzo |
| 2002 Apertura | Villa Modelo |
| 2002 Clausura | River Plate |
| 2003 Apertura | River Plate |
| 2003 Clausura | Boca Juniors |
| 2004 Apertura | Argentinos Juniors |
| 2004 Clausura | San Lorenzo |
| 2005 Apertura | Pinocho |
| 2005 Clausura | Pinocho |
| 2006 Apertura | Pinocho |
| 2006 Clausura | San Lorenzo |
| 2007 Apertura | Pinocho |
| 2007 Clausura | Pinocho |
| 2008 Apertura | Pinocho |
| 2008 Clausura | Pinocho |
| 2009 Apertura | Pinocho |
| 2009 Clausura | Pinocho |
| 2010 Apertura | Pinocho |
| 2010 Clausura | Pinocho |
| 2011 Apertura | Pinocho |
| 2011 Clausura | Boca Juniors |
| 2012 Apertura | Boca Juniors |
| 2012 Clausura | Pinocho |
| 2013 Apertura | Boca Juniors |
| 2013 Clausura | Boca Juniors |
| 2014 Apertura | Boca Juniors |
| 2014 Clausura | Boca Juniors |
| 2015 Clausura | Kimberley |
| 2015 Apertura | Pinocho |
| 2016 | Kimberley |
| 2017 | Boca Juniors |
| 2018 | San Lorenzo |
| 2019 | San Lorenzo |
| 2020 | Boca Juniors |
| 2021 | Barracas Central |
| 2022 | San Lorenzo |
| 2023 | San Lorenzo |
| 2024 | 17 de Agosto |
| 2025 | 17 de Agosto |

== Titles by club ==
The list include all the titles won by each club since the first futsal championship held in 1986

| Club | Titles | Winning seasons |
|---|---|---|
| Pinocho | 14 | 2005 Apertura, 2005 Clausura, 2006 Apertura, 2007 Apertura, 2007 Clausura, 2008 Apertura, 2008 Clausura, 2009 Apertura, 2009 Clausura, 2010 Apertura, 2010 Clausura, 2011 Apertura, 2011 Clausura, 2015 Clausura |
| Boca Juniors | 13 | 1992, 1993, 1997 Clausura, 1998 Apertura, 2003 Clausura, 2011 Clausura, 2012 Apertura, 2013 Apertura, 2013 Clausura, 2014 Apertura, 2014 Clausura, 2017, 2020 |
| San Lorenzo | 10 | 1999 Apertura, 1999 Clausura, 2000 Clausura, 2001 Clausura, 2004 Clausura, 2006 Clausura, 2018, 2019, 2022, 2023 |
| River Plate | 3 | 1991, 2002 Clausura, 2003 Apertura |
| Atlanta | 3 | 1989, 1990, 1996 |
| Kimberley | 2 | 2015, 2016 |
| Argentinos Juniors | 2 | 2000 Apertura, 2004 Apertura |
| Newell's Old Boys | 2 | 1987, 1994 |
| 17 de Agosto | 2 | 2024, 2025 |
| Franja de Oro | 1 | 2001 Apertura |
| Rosario Central | 1 | 1986 |
| Tigre | 1 | 1998 Clausura |
| Deportivo Laferrere | 1 | 1995 |
| Lugano | 1 | 1997 Apertura |
| Muñiz | 1 | 1988 |
| Villa Modelo | 1 | 2002 Apertura |
| Barracas Central | 1 | 2021 |

== Notable players ==
Many notable Argentine football players started playing futsal when they were children. Some of them are Fernando Redondo, Juan Pablo Sorín, Andrés D'Alessandro, Esteban Cambiasso and Juan Román Riquelme (in Club Parque), Marcelo Gallardo in Estrella de Maldonado and Leandro Romagnoli in Franja de Oro.
