= 1912 in Argentine football =

Football in Argentina
- Season: 1912

Men's football
- Primera División: Quilmes (AFA); Porteño (FAF)
- Intermedia: Ferro C. Oeste (AFA); Tigre (FAF)
- Segunda División: Banfield (AFA); Tigre (FAF)
- Primera C: Boca Juniors III (AFA); Gim. y Esg. BA III (FAF)
- Copa de Honor: Racing Club
- Copa de Competencia: San Isidro

1912 in Argentine football saw the division of Argentine football into two rival associations, when Federación Argentina de Football (FAF) was established to organise its own championships. Thus, Quilmes won the official AFA tournament, while Porteño won the FAF title.

== Primera División ==
=== Asociación Argentina de Football - Copa Campeonato ===
Many former players of Alumni (dissolved one year later) went to play for Quilmes, which would be the champion. The tournament had no relegations.

| Pos | Team | Pts | G | W | D | L | Gf | Ga | Gd |
|---|---|---|---|---|---|---|---|---|---|
| 1 | Quilmes | 15 | 10 | 7 | 1 | 2 | 24 | 8 | +16 |
| 2 | San Isidro | 11 | 9 | 5 | 1 | 3 | 16 | 22 | -6 |
| 3 | Racing Club | 10 | 10 | 4 | 2 | 4 | 24 | 16 | +8 |
| 4 | Estudiantes (BA) | 8 | 9 | 4 | 0 | 5 | 15 | 18 | -3 |
| 5 | Belgrano AC | 7 | 10 | 3 | 1 | 6 | 20 | 20 | 0 |
| 6 | River Plate | 7 | 10 | 3 | 1 | 6 | 8 | 23 | -15 |

=== Federación Argentina de Football ===
In July 1912, Gimnasia y Esgrima de Buenos Aires disaffiliated from Asociación Argentina de Football, founding the Federación Argentina de Football (FAF) presided by Ricardo Aldao. Recently promoted teams Porteño and Estudiantes (LP) joined the new league, among other clubs.

1912 was the inaugural season of the dissident FAF league. This tournament was formed by 3 dissident teams from the Asociación Argentina (AAF): Estudiantes de La Plata, Gimnasia y Esgrima (BA) and Porteño, plus the 4 teams promoted from the second division: Argentino de Quilmes, Atlanta, Independiente and Kimberley (Villa Devoto). The last club added was the recently created Sociedad Sportiva Argentina.

| Pos | Team | Pts | G | W | D | L | Gf | Ga | Gd |
|---|---|---|---|---|---|---|---|---|---|
| 1 | Independiente | 20 | 14 | 9 | 3 | 3 | 33 | 12 | +21 |
| 2 | Porteño | 20 | 14 | 8 | 4 | 2 | 24 | 10 | +14 |
| 3 | Estudiantes (LP) | 19 | 14 | 8 | 3 | 3 | 23 | 14 | +9 |
| 4 | Gimnasia y Esgrima (BA) | 18 | 14 | 7 | 4 | 3 | 26 | 18 | +8 |
| 5 | Argentino de Quilmes | 17 | 14 | 7 | 3 | 4 | 34 | 27 | +7 |
| 6 | Atlanta | 12 | 14 | 6 | 0 | 8 | 24 | 28 | -4 |
| 7 | Kimberley AC (BA) | 6 | 14 | 2 | 2 | 10 | 17 | 48 | -31 |
| 8 | Sociedad Sportiva Argentina | 6 | 14 | 0 | 0 | 14 | 6 | 30 | -24 |

==== Championship playoff ====
Independiente and Porteño finished level on points at the top of the table, necessitating a championship playoff. The game was suspended at 87' after the Independiente players abandoned the pitch in protest at a disallowed goal by referee Carlos Aertz. The championship was then awarded to Porteño.

==== Final ====
23 December 1912

| Porteño | 1-1 | Independiente |
|---|---|---|
| P. Rithner | | Lloveras |

Palermo, Buenos Aires

== Lower divisions ==
=== Intermedia ===
- AFA Champion: Ferro Carril Oeste
- FAF Champion: Tigre

=== Segunda División ===
- AFA Champion: Banfield
- FAF Champion: Tigre

== Domestic cups ==
=== Copa de Honor Municipalidad de Buenos Aires ===
Champion: Racing Club

==== Final ====
1912

| Racing Club | 3-0 | Newell's |

=== Copa de Competencia Jockey Club ===
- Champion: San Isidro

==== Final ====
1912

| San Isidro | 0-0 | Quilmes |

San Isidro

==== Final ====
1912

| San Isidro | 2-1 | Quilmes |

Quilmes

== International cups ==
=== Tie Cup ===
- Champion: (Argentina) San Isidro

==== Final ====
17 November 1912

| San Isidro (Argentina) | 1-0 | (Uruguay) Nacional |
|---|---|---|
| | Report |

Buenos Aires

=== Copa de Honor Cousenier ===
- Champion: (Uruguay) River Plate

==== Final ====
8 December 1912

| River Plate (Uruguay) | 2–1 | (Argentina) Racing Club |
|---|---|---|
| | Report |

Montevideo

== Argentina national team ==
Argentina only won one of the five Cups disputed against Uruguay, the Copa Montevideo played in December 1912.

=== Copa Lipton ===
15 August 1912

| Argentina | 0-2 | Uruguay |
|---|---|---|
| | Report |

Montevideo

=== Copa Premier Honor Uruguayo ===
25 August 1912

| Argentina | 0-3 | Uruguay |
|---|---|---|
| | Report |

Montevideo

=== Copa Premier Honor Argentino ===
22 September 1912

| Argentina | 0-1 | Uruguay |
|---|---|---|
| | Report |

Buenos Aires

=== Copa Newton ===
6 October 1912

| Argentina | 3-3 | Uruguay |
|---|---|---|
| | Report |

Avellaneda

=== Copa Montevideo ===
1 December 1912

| Argentina | 3-1 (aet) | Uruguay |
|---|---|---|
| | Report |

Montevideo

=== Friendly matches ===
| Date | Venue/City | Rival | Score | Report |
|---|---|---|---|---|
| 30 June 1912 | Montevideo | Peñarol/Nacional Combined | 2-0 | |
| 9 July 1912 | Buenos Aires | Swindon Town | 0-1 | |
| 4 September 1912 | São Paulo | Paulistano | 3-4 | |
| 5 September 1912 | São Paulo | Americano | 3-0 | |
| 7 September 1912 | São Paulo | Foreigners of São Paulo | 6-3 | |
| 8 September 1912 | São Paulo | São Paulo State Team | 6-3 | |
| 12 September 1912 | Rio de Janeiro | Rio de Janeiro League | 4-0 | |
| 14 September 1912 | Rio de Janeiro | English of Rio de Janeiro | 9-1 | |
| 16 September 1912 | Rio de Janeiro | Guanabara State Team | 5-0 | |
