= Kimberley Atlético Club =

Kimberley
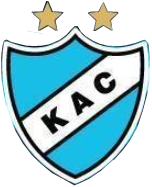
- Full name: Kimberley Atlético Club
- Nicknames: Celeste, Kimber
- Founded: 4 August 1906; 119 years ago
- Ground: Monroe and Ceretti, Buenos Aires
- President: Matías Rodgers
- League: Primera División de Futsal
- 2020: 7th.
Home colours

Kimberley Atlético Club is an Argentine sports club based in the Villa Devoto district of Buenos Aires. Nowadays Kimberley is mostly known for its futsal team, which currently competes in Primera División, the main futsal championship organised by the Argentine Football Association (AFA).

Kimberley was affiliated to the Federación Argentina de Football (then merged with official AFA), having played in the top division, Primera División, during the 1910s although the club disaffiliated in 1916. In 2006 Kimberley rejoined AFA to compete in the futsal tournaments organised by the Association.

== History ==
=== Foundation and football years ===
The club was founded on 4 August 1906 as "Kimberley Athletic Club" by a group of young enthusiasts led by José Chiesa, R. Viviani and brothers Julio and José Pianaroli. The Pianaroli had been founding members of Club Atlético Platense one year before, and left the club due to internal conflicts. Kimberley affiliated to the Argentine Football Association (AFA) in 1907, competing in lower divisions until 1911.

The first field of Kimberley was located on Blandengues (current Avenida del Libertador) and Crisólogo Larralde in Núñez, Buenos Aires, close to Estadio Monumental.

Kimberley kit worn during its first years

It is believed that the name "Kimberley" was taken from the homonymous city in South Africa, capital of Northern Cape, as the club was established in 1906, the same year a South Africa team (Note: The team that toured South America was composed of players from The all-white Football Association of South Africa (FASA)) toured on Argentina.

In July 1912, Gimnasia y Esgrima de Buenos Aires disaffiliated from the Argentine Football Association (AFA), founding the Federación Argentina de Football (FAF) presided by Ricardo Aldao. Recently promoted teams Porteño and Estudiantes (LP) joined the new league, among other clubs.

1912 was the inaugural season of the dissident FAF league. This tournament was contested by 3 dissident teams from the AFA: Estudiantes de La Plata, Gimnasia y Esgrima (BA) and Porteño. As a División Intermedia (second division) promoted team, Kimberley joined the FAF with the other clubs promoted, Argentino de Quilmes, Atlanta and Independiente. During that first season, Kimberley played most of their home teams at GEBA Stadium.

The next season, Kimberley inaugurated its own home field in Villa Urquiza, on Monroe and Ceretti streets, playing its first match on August 3. Kimberley played in the top level of Argentine football until 1915, when the team was relegated after finishing 22° of 25.

After being relegated, Kimberley stayed one season (1916) in División Intermedia, but the club disaffiliated from the AFA after failing in its attempt to promote to higher division. In 1939, the club moved its headquarters to Villa Devoto, on Joaquín V. González street, where has remained since then.

Kimberley started to enforce its children football section in the 1970s, helped by former footballer Carlos Fren. In 2006 the club registered its children teams with AFA to play official tournaments, achieving success since then.

=== Rebirth through futsal ===
The club registered its futsal team with the AFA in 2006 and started participating in lower divisions championships. One year later, Kimberley promoted to Primera División after beating Club Franja de Oro in playoffs.

In 2016, Kimberley won the Supercopa Argentina de Futsal, after beating River Plate 3–2, therefore qualifying for Copa Libertadores. It was the second title of the season for the club, having previously defeated Boca Juniors in the league competition.

Kimberley also played the Copa Argentina de Futsal, reaching the final for the first time in its history in 2018 although the team lost to San Lorenzo 3–1. Kimberley also took part of Supercopa Argentina, where it was eliminated by San Lorenzo in quarter finals.

== Honours ==
=== Futsal ===
- División de Honor (2): 2015, 2016
- Supercopa (1): 2016
