= Federación Argentina de Football =

Football organising body

Argentina
- Founded: 14 June 1912
- Folded: 23 December 1914; 111 years ago
- Headquarters: Buenos Aires
- FIFA affiliation: No
- President: Ricardo Aldao (1912–14)

The Federación Argentina de Football (FAF) was a dissident football association of Argentina that organised its own championships from 1912 to 1914. The Argentine Football Association did not recognised those championships until both associations were merged in 1914. Currently, all the championships organised by the FAF are considered officials by the AFA.

== History ==
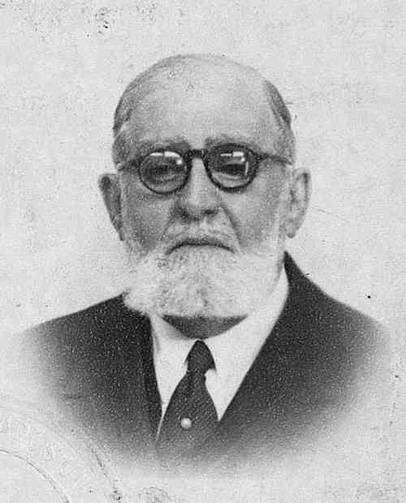
President of Gimnasia y Esgrima Ricardo Aldao was one of the promoters of FAF, being also its president

The organisation of football championships suffered its first breakup in 1912 after a conflict originated between Gimnasia y Esgrima de Buenos Aires and AFA. GEBA's incorporation had been welcomed by all due to its modern stadium –one of the main football venues in Argentina along with Sociedad Sportiva Argentina's— After the club requested that its members not pay admission and demanded a portion of the revenue as rent for the use of the stadium. As the request was denied by AFA, several clubs quit the association to form their own league, therefore "Federación Argentina de Football" was officially established on 14 June 1912. Founding members were Gimnasia y Esgrima (BA), Independiente, Porteño, Estudiantes (LP), Argentino de Quilmes, Atlanta, Kimberley, and Sociedad Sportiva Argentina.

Independiente was the first champion of the FAF Primera División in 1912.

The next year, Hispano Argentino and Tigre were added to the competition, increasing the number of teams to 10. By 1914, the number of teams decreased to eight. The body also organised a national cup, the Copa de Competencia La Nación, named after local newspaper La Nación that had donated the trophy.

After both associations, FAF and AFA were merged on 23 December 1914, there was a unique championship in 1915, with 25 teams taking part and four of them (Kimberley, Defensores de Belgrano, Comercio and Floresta) relegated at the end of the season.

Nevertheless, a new breakup would come in 1919 when another dissident body, the Asociación Amateurs de Football, was established.

== Competitions ==
The FAF organised several competitions, as listed below:

- Primera División (1912–14)
- División Intermedia (1912–14)
- Segunda División (1912–14)
- Tercera División (1912–14)
- Copa de Competencia La Nación (1913–14)

== Champions ==
=== First Division ===
| Season | Champion |
|---|---|
| 1912 | Porteño |
| 1913 | Estudiantes (LP) |
| 1914 | Porteño |

=== División Intermedia ===
| Season | Champion |
|---|---|
| 1912 | Tigre |
| 1913 | Floresta |
| 1914 | Defensores de Belgrano |

=== Segunda División ===
| Season | Champion |
|---|---|
| 1912 | Tigre |
| 1913 | Estudiantes (LP) III (Note: Reserve teams.) |
| 1914 | Tigre Juniors |

=== Tercera División ===
| Season | Champion |
|---|---|
| 1912 | Gimnasia y Esgrima (BA) |
| 1913 | Solís |
| 1914 | Vélez Sarsfield |

=== Copa de Competencia La Nación ===
| Season | Champion |
|---|---|
| 1913 | Rosario Central |
| 1914 | Independiente |

== See also ==
- Asociación Amateurs de Football
- Liga Argentina de Football
- Football in Argentina
