= Argentino de Quilmes =

Argentine association football club

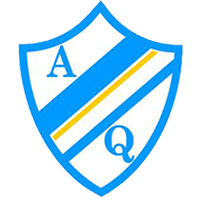
- Full name: Club Atlético Argentino de Quilmes
- Nickname: Mate
- Founded: 1 December 1899; 126 years ago
- Ground: Argentino de Quilmes; Quilmes, Greater Buenos Aires
- Capacity: 12,000
- Chairman: Paola Capolo
- Manager: Fabián Cecconato
- League: Primera B
- 2025: 16th of 21
Home colours	Away colours	Third colours

Club Atlético Argentino de Quilmes, simply known as Argentino de Quilmes, is an Argentine football club from Quilmes, Buenos Aires. The team currently plays in Primera B, the third division of the Argentine football league system.

== History ==
The club was founded on 1 December 1899 by a group of students of Colegio Nacional de Buenos Aires, as a reaction against British hegemony in Quilmes Atlético Club, which did not permit Argentine natives to play.

Unlike Quilmes AC, which honored visiting players with the traditional tea, the recently founded club Argentino de Quilmes offered "mate", a traditional infusion drink very popular in Argentina. That originated the nickname which Argentino would be known for.

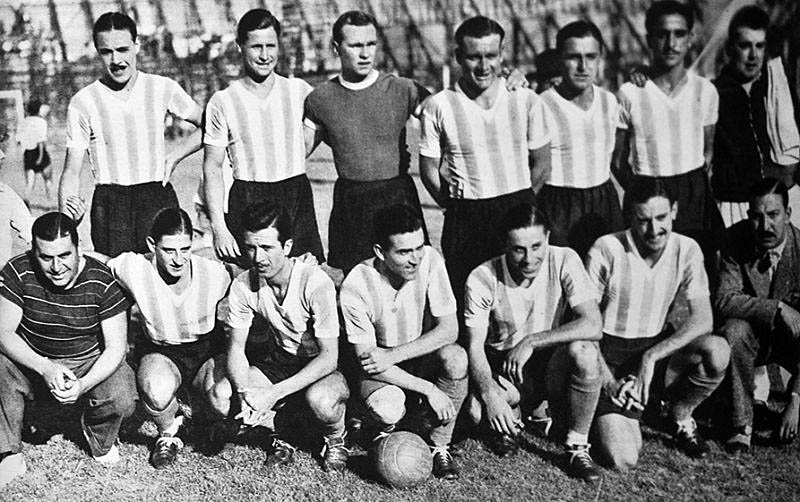
The 1938 team that promoted to Primera División in 1938.

In 1902 Argentino affiliated to Argentine Football Association and began participating in the domestic championships, making its debut in Primera División in 1912. The team lasted there until 1918 when it was relegated to the second division.

In 1938 Argentino de Quilmes won the Primera B title after defeating its main rival Quilmes Atlético Club, and therefore promoting to Primera División. Nevertheless, during the 1939 season Argentino made its worst campaign ever, obtaining only 4 points over 34 matches played and finishing in the last position. Argentino conceded 148 goals, scoring only 35, being relegated to the second division.

At the end of the 2005–06 season, Argentino was relegated to Primera D, the fifth division of Argentine football.

== Titles ==
- Primera B (1): 1938
- Primera C (3): 1945, 1988–89, 2018–19
- Primera D (1): 2012–13
