= 1925 in Argentine football =

Football in Argentina
- Season: 1925

1925 in Argentine football saw Huracán winning its 3rd. Asociación Argentina de Football (AFA) championship while Racing Club won the dissident league AAm championship, being the 9th. title for the club.

== Primera División ==
=== Asociación Argentina de Football - Copa Campeonato ===
Sportivo del Norte changed its name to "Club Atlético Colegiales" and Platense II to "Retiro" (and later to "Universal") while Villa Urquiza changed to "General San Martín".

Pos	Team	Pts	G	W	D	L	Gf	Ga	Gd
1	Huracán	38	21	18	2	1	51	12	+39
2	Nueva Chicago	38	21	18	2	1	46	10	+36
3	El Porvenir	32	21	14	4	3	30	15	+15
4	Temperley	30	20	13	4	3	35	14	+21
5	Chacarita Juniors	28	21	12	4	5	42	19	+23
6	Argentino de Banfield	23	21	9	5	7	31	23	+8
7	Palermo	23	21	10	3	8	29	26	+3
8	General San Martín	22	22	8	6	8	22	24	-2
9	Sportivo Barracas	22	22	8	6	8	22	24	-2
10	Progresista	22	22	6	10	6	23	27	-4
11	Sportsman	18	21	5	8	8	17	21	-4
12	Del Plata	18	20	7	4	9	19	31	-12
13	Dock Sud	18	21	4	10	7	14	24	-10
14	Colegiales	17	21	6	5	10	18	30	-12
15	Boca Alumni	17	22	5	7	10	13	27	-14
16	All Boys	16	21	5	6	10	16	19	-3
17	Universal	15	20	4	7	9	17	25	-8
18	Argentino de Quilmes	15	20	4	7	9	18	30	-12
19	Porteño	14	21	3	8	10	24	44	-20
20	Boca Juniors	13	7	6	1	0	16	3	+13
21	San Fernando	13	22	4	5	13	19	30	-11
22	Argentinos Juniors	13	22	3	7	12	13	24	-11
23	Alvear	5	20	2	1	17	8	41	-33

==== Championship playoff ====
22 August 1926

Huracán	1-1	Nueva Chicago

Sportivo Barracas

=== Asociación Amateurs de Football ===
Pos	Team	Pts	G	W	D	L	Gf	Ga	Gd
1	Racing Club	39	24	15	9	0	40	10	+30
2	San Lorenzo	36	24	14	8	2	41	20	-21
3	Sportivo Almagro	32	24	14	4	6	37	17	+20
4	Platense	32	24	13	6	5	34	21	+13
5	Estudiantes (LP)	30	24	12	6	6	45	31	+14
6	Independiente	29	24	11	7	6	29	17	+12
7	Sportivo Palermo	28	24	10	8	6	32	21	+11
8	Sportivo Buenos Aires	27	24	11	5	8	39	30	+9
9	Defensores de Belgrano	27	24	9	9	6	21	19	+2
10	Lanús	27	24	9	9	6	21	19	+2
11	Liberal Argentino	26	24	9	8	7	19	21	-2
12	Gimnasia y Esgrima (LP)	23	24	9	5	10	19	24	-5
13	Quilmes	22	24	7	8	9	28	32	-4
14	Excursionistas	22	24	7	8	9	17	25	-8
15	Banfield	21	24	7	7	10	20	29	-9
16	Tigre	21	24	8	5	11	26	39	-13
17	River Plate	20	24	7	6	11	21	24	-3
18	Atlanta	20	24	6	8	10	19	23	-4
19	Argentino del Sud	20	24	7	6	11	20	25	-5
20	Vélez Sarsfield	20	24	4	12	8	18	29	-11
21	Ferro Carril Oeste	19	24	7	5	12	27	37	-10
22	Barracas Central	18	24	6	6	12	22	36	-14
23	San Isidro	16	24	5	6	13	24	30	-6
24	Estudiantil Porteño	14	24	5	4	15	19	33	-14
25	Estudiantes (BA)	11	24	3	5	16	12	38	-16

== Lower divisions ==
=== Primera B ===
- AFA Champion: Sportivo Balcarce
- AAm Champion: Talleres (BA)

=== Primera C ===
- AFA Champion: Sportivo Balcarce II
- AAm Champion: Perla del Plata

== Domestic cups ==
=== Copa de Competencia (AAm) ===
- Champion: Independiente

==== Final ====
1926-03-28

Independiente	2-0	Sportivo Palermo
	Report

River Plate (Recoleta)

=== Copa de Competencia Jockey Club ===
- Champion: Boca Juniors

==== Final ====
1926-04-18

Boca Juniors	1-1	Argentinos Juniors
	Report

Boca Juniors

1926-04-25

Boca Juniors	1-0	Argentinos Juniors
	Report

Boca Juniors

=== Copa Ibarguren ===
- Champion: Huracán

==== Final ====
1926-09-19

Huracán	2-1	Tiro Federal
Pratto 30', Stábile 67'	Report	López 60'

Huracán

== Argentina national team ==
Argentina won the 1925 Copa América played at its own country, being Brazil the runner-up.
