= 1925 Argentine Primera División =

34th season of top-tier football league in Argentina

Primera División
- Season: 1925
- Dates: 5 April 1925 – 22 August 1926
- Champions: Huracán (AFA); Racing (AAmF)

The 1925 Argentine Primera División was the 34th season of top-flight football in Argentina. The AFA season began on April 5 and ended in 1926; while the AAmF began on April 5 and ended on October 25.

Huracán won its 3rd. Asociación Argentina de Football (AFA) championship while Racing won the dissident league AAm championship, being the 9th. title for the club.

== Asociación Argentina de Football - Copa Campeonato ==
Primera División (AFA)
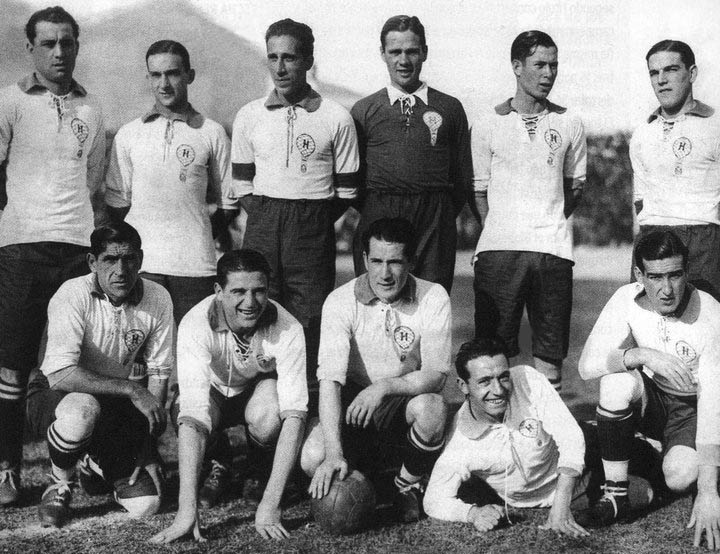
- Huracán, AFA champions
- Season: 1925
- Dates: 5 April 1925 – 22 August 1926
- Champions: Huracán (3rd title)
- Promoted: Chacarita Juniors
- Relegated: (none)
- Top goalscorer: (Argentina) Guillermo Stábile (17)

Sportivo del Norte changed its name to "Club Atlético Colegiales" and Platense II to "Retiro" (and later to "Universal") while Villa Urquiza changed to "General San Martín".

Pos	Team	Pld	W	D	L	GF	GA	GD	Pts
1	Huracán	21	18	2	1	51	12	+39	38
2	Nueva Chicago	21	18	2	1	46	10	+36	38
3	El Porvenir	21	14	4	3	30	15	+15	32
4	Temperley	20	13	4	3	35	14	+21	30
5	Chacarita Juniors	21	12	4	5	42	19	+23	28
6	Argentino (B)	21	9	5	7	31	23	+8	23
7	Palermo	21	10	3	8	29	26	+3	23
8	Villa Urquiza	22	8	6	8	22	24	−2	22
9	Sportivo Barracas	22	8	6	8	22	24	−2	22
10	Progresista	22	6	10	6	23	27	−4	22
11	Sportsman	21	5	8	8	17	21	−4	18
12	Del Plata	20	7	4	9	19	31	−12	18
13	Dock Sud	21	4	10	7	14	24	−10	18
14	Colegiales	21	6	5	10	18	30	−12	17
15	Boca Alumni	22	5	7	10	13	27	−14	17
16	All Boys	21	5	6	10	16	19	−3	16
17	Universal	20	4	7	9	17	25	−8	15
18	Argentino (Q)	20	4	7	9	18	30	−12	15
19	Porteño	21	3	8	10	24	44	−20	14
20	Boca Juniors	7	6	1	0	16	3	+13	13 (Note: Boca Juniors only played 7 matches since the team was on a large tour over Europe.)
21	San Fernando	22	4	5	13	19	30	−11	13
22	Argentinos Juniors	22	3	7	12	13	24	−11	13
23	Alvear	20	2	1	17	8	41	−33	5

=== Championship playoff ===
Date	Team 1	Res.	Team 2	Venue	City
22 Aug	Huracán	1–1 (Note: The match was suspended before the extra time was played due to the players of Nueva Chicago refused to play it, leaving the field. As a result, the Association crowned Huracán as champion.)	Nueva Chicago	Sportivo Barracas	Buenos Aires

==== Match details ====
1925 Primera División Final
22 August 1926

Huracán	1–1	Nueva Chicago
Stábile 65'	Report	Maure 4'

Sportivo Barracas, Buenos Aires
Referee: L. Celleri

Huracán	Nueva Chicago

GK	(Argentina) Armando Ceresetto
DF	(Argentina) Carlos Nóbile
DF	(Argentina) Juan Pratto
MF	(Argentina) Luis Molinari
MF	(Argentina) A. Chiesa
MF	(Argentina) Cayetano Federico
FW	(Argentina) Adán Loizo
FW	(Argentina) Enrique Gaztelú
FW	(Argentina) Guillermo Stábile
FW	(Argentina) Ángel Chiesa
FW	(Argentina) Cesáreo Onzari

GK	(Argentina) Constantino García
DF	(Argentina) Juan Locatti
DF	(Argentina) José Voltura
MF	(Argentina) Vicente Capano
MF	(Argentina) Emilio Semino
MF	(Argentina) Emilio Solari
FW	(Argentina) Juan Villagra
FW	(Argentina) Edmundo Maure
FW	(Argentina) F. Minalla
FW	(Argentina) Sergio Varela	Sent off (straight red)
FW	(Argentina) Romeo Corvetto

==== Top scorers ====
Rank	Player	Club	Goals
1	(Argentina) Guillermo Stábile	Huracán	17
2	(Argentina) José Gaslini	Chacarita Juniors	15
3	(Argentina) Armando Stagnaro	Palermo	14
3	(Argentina) Sergio Varela	Nueva Chicago	14

=== Asociación Amateurs de Football ===
Primera División (AAmF)
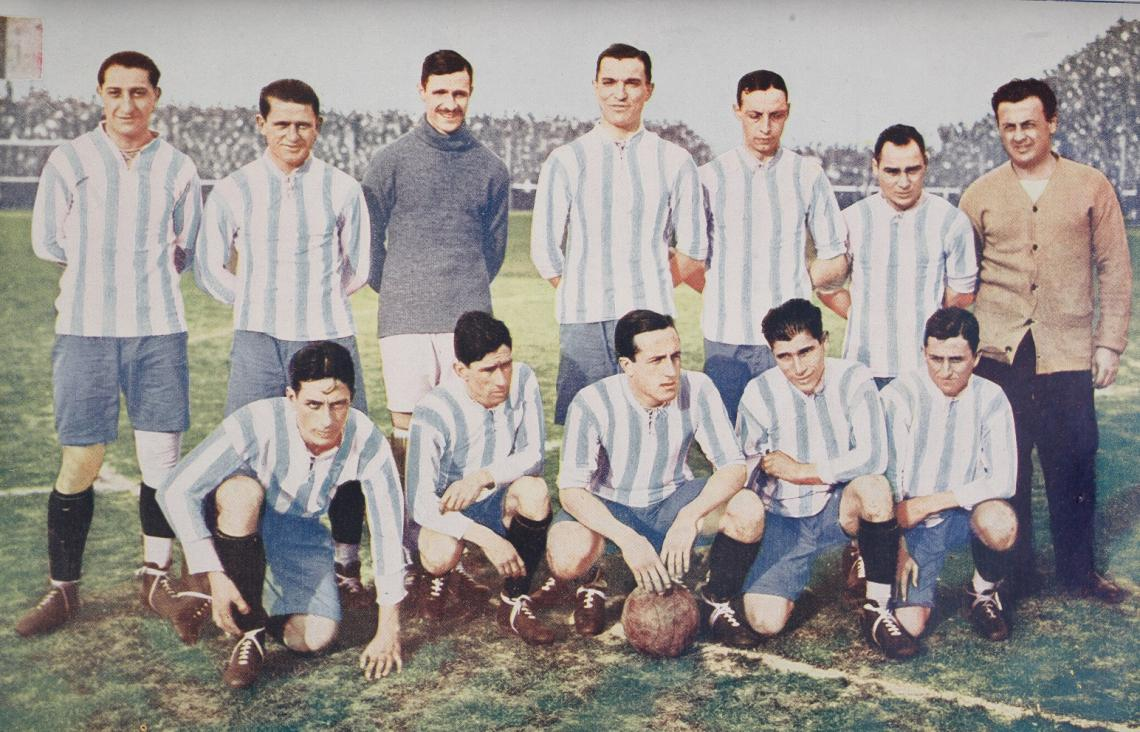
- Racing Club, AAmF champions
- Season: 1925
- Dates: 5 April – 22 November
- Champions: Racing (9th title)
- Promoted: Excursionistas
- Relegated: (none)
- Top goalscorer: (Argentina) Alberto Bellomo (Estudiantes LP) (16 goals)

Pos	Team	Pld	W	D	L	GF	GA	GD	Pts
1	Racing (C)	24	15	9	0	40	10	+30	39
2	San Lorenzo	24	14	8	2	41	20	+21	36
3	Sportivo Almagro	24	14	4	6	37	17	+20	32
4	Platense	24	13	6	5	34	21	+13	32
5	Estudiantes (LP)	24	12	6	6	45	31	+14	30
6	Independiente	24	11	7	6	29	17	+12	29
7	Sportivo Palermo	24	10	8	6	32	21	+11	28
8	Sportivo Buenos Aires	24	11	5	8	39	30	+9	27
9	Defensores de Belgrano	24	9	9	6	21	19	+2	27
10	Lanús	24	9	9	6	21	19	+2	27
11	Liberal Argentino	24	9	8	7	19	21	−2	26
12	Gimnasia y Esgrima (LP)	24	9	5	10	19	24	−5	23
13	Quilmes	24	7	8	9	28	32	−4	22
14	Excursionistas	24	7	8	9	17	25	−8	22
15	Banfield	24	7	7	10	20	29	−9	21
16	Tigre	24	8	5	11	26	39	−13	21
17	River Plate	24	7	6	11	21	24	−3	20
18	Atlanta	24	6	8	10	19	23	−4	20
19	Argentino del Sud	24	7	6	11	20	25	−5	20
20	Vélez Sarsfield	24	4	12	8	18	29	−11	20
21	Ferro Carril Oeste	24	7	5	12	27	37	−10	19
22	Barracas Central	24	6	6	12	22	36	−14	18
23	San Isidro	24	5	6	13	24	30	−6	16
24	Estudiantil Porteño	24	5	4	15	19	33	−14	14
25	Estudiantes (BA)	24	3	5	16	12	38	−26	11

(C) Champions

==== Top scorers ====
Rank	Player	Club	Goals
1	(Argentina) Francisco Bellomo	Estudiantes LP	17
2	(Argentina) Adriano Vitali	Sp. Almagro	14
3	(Argentina) Domingo Lattari	Sp. Almagro	12
