= 1924 Argentine Primera División =

33rd season of top-tier football league in Argentina

Primera División
- Season: 1924
- Dates: 6 April 1924 – 4 January 1925
- Champions: Boca Juniors (AFA); San Lorenzo (AAmF)

The 1924 Argentine Primera División was the 33rd season of top-flight football in Argentina. The AFA season began on April 13 and ended on January 4, 1925; while the AAmF began on April 6 and ended on February 15, 1925.

== Final tables ==
=== Asociación Argentina de Football - Copa Campeonato ===
Primera División (AFA)
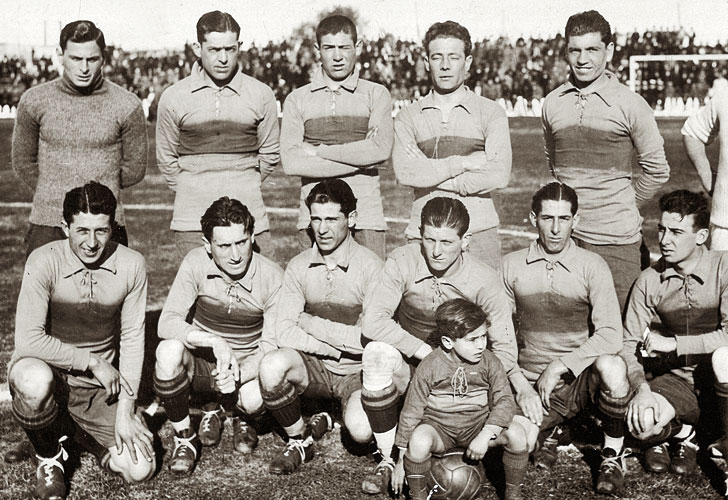
- Boca Juniors, AFA champions
- Season: 1924
- Dates: 13 April 1924 – 4 January 1925
- Champions: Boca Juniors (4th title)
- Promoted: Sportsman
- Top goalscorer: (Argentina) Domingo Tarasconi (16)
- Biggest home win: Huracán 7-0 Palermo (7 Sep)
- Biggest away win: V. Urquiza 0–7 Boca Jrs. (7 Dec)

Club Atlético Sportsman made its debut in Primera División.

Pos	Team	Pld	W	D	L	GF	GA	GD	Pts
1	Boca Juniors (C)	19	18	1	0	67	8	+59	37
2	Temperley	21	13	6	2	35	16	+19	32
3	Dock Sud	21	12	5	4	28	16	+12	29
4	All Boys	20	11	7	2	26	15	+11	29
5	El Porvenir	21	11	5	5	32	23	+9	27
6	Sportivo Barracas	21	10	5	6	31	25	+6	25
7	Huracán	18	10	4	4	36	11	+25	24
8	Nueva Chicago	21	8	7	6	27	26	+1	23
9	Boca Alumni	21	8	6	7	23	20	+3	22
10	San Fernando	21	7	7	7	27	26	+1	21
11	Argentino (B)	21	8	3	10	33	34	−1	19
12	Argentinos Juniors	21	8	2	11	21	24	−3	18
13	Platense II	21	6	6	9	19	24	−5	18
14	Sportivo del Norte	21	7	4	10	18	24	−6	18
15	Palermo	21	6	6	9	28	38	−10	18
16	Sportsman	20	3	12	5	16	23	−7	18
17	Argentino (Q)	21	6	6	9	21	32	−11	18
18	Alvear	20	5	5	10	15	22	−7	15
19	Porteño	20	5	4	11	19	37	−18	14
20	Progresista	20	3	6	11	23	35	−12	12
21	Del Plata	21	4	2	15	21	39	−18	10
22	Villa Urquiza	21	2	1	18	9	57	−48	5

Source: rsssf.com
(C) Champions

=== Asociación Amateur de Football ===
Primera División (AAmF)
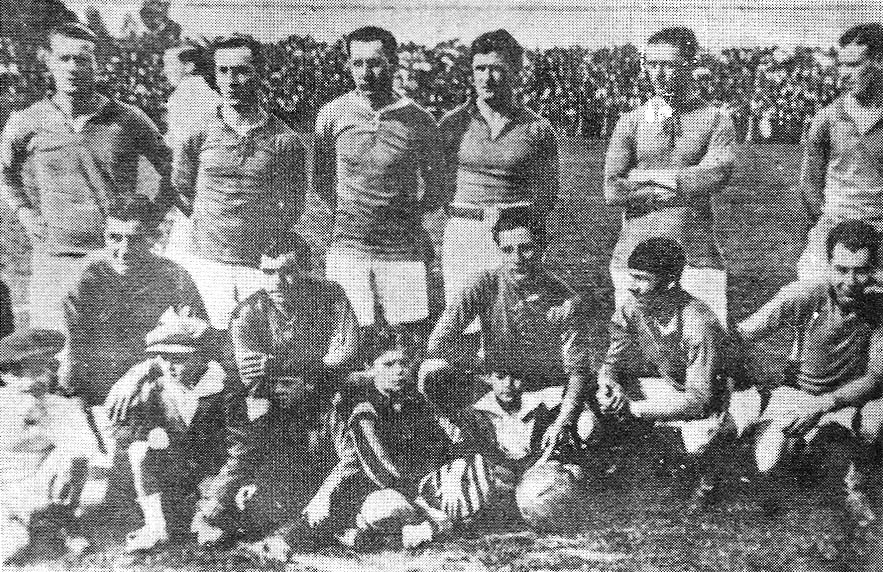
- San Lorenzo, AAmF champions
- Season: 1924
- Dates: 6 April – 16 November
- Champions: San Lorenzo (2nd title)
- Promoted: Liberal Argentino
- Relegated: (none)
- Top goalscorer: (Argentina) Fausto Lucarelli (Argentina) Luis Ravaschino (15 goals each)

Club Atlético Liberal Argentino made its debut in Primera División.

Pos	Team	Pld	W	D	L	GF	GA	GD	Pts
1	San Lorenzo (C)	23	18	3	2	48	15	+33	39
2	Gimnasia y Esgrima (LP)	23	15	7	1	39	9	+30	37
3	Independiente	23	16	4	3	47	9	+38	36
4	Platense	23	14	8	1	30	6	+24	36
5	River Plate	23	13	5	5	30	20	+10	31
6	Racing	23	14	2	7	39	16	+23	30
7	Tigre	23	11	7	5	27	19	+8	29
8	Sportivo Buenos Aires	23	10	8	5	35	28	+7	28
9	San Isidro	23	11	5	7	37	29	+8	27
10	Estudiantes (LP)	23	10	6	7	38	24	+14	26
11	Defensores de Belgrano	23	8	9	6	32	26	+6	25
12	Banfield	23	8	7	8	27	28	−1	23
13	Atlanta	23	7	6	10	24	28	−4	20
14	Sportivo Palermo	23	7	5	11	26	43	−17	19
15	Barracas Central	23	6	6	11	21	30	−9	18
16	Lanús	23	6	6	11	18	36	−18	18
17	Vélez Sarsfield	23	6	5	12	26	35	−9	17
18	Sportivo Almagro	23	6	5	12	17	30	−13	17
19	Estudiantil Porteño	23	4	7	12	16	37	−21	15
20	Liberal Argentino	23	4	5	14	17	31	−14	13
21	Argentino del Sud	23	6	2	15	23	35	−12	12 (Note: 2 points deducted?)
22	Quilmes	23	3	6	14	20	40	−20	12
23	Ferro Carril Oeste	23	4	4	15	16	43	−27	12
24	Estudiantes (BA)	23	3	4	16	16	52	−36	10

(C) Champions
