= 1923 Argentine Primera División =

32nd season of top-tier football league in Argentina

Primera División
- Season: 1923
- Dates: 11 March 1923 – 27 April 1924
- Champions: Boca Juniors (AFA); San Lorenzo (AAmF)

The 1923 Argentine Primera División was the 32nd season of top-flight football in Argentina. The AFA season began on March 11 and ended on April 27, 1924.

Boca Juniors win its 3rd league title in the official AFA league while San Lorenzo achieved its first title ever at the top division winning the AAm championship.

== Asociación Argentina de Football - Copa Campeonato ==
Primera División (AFA)
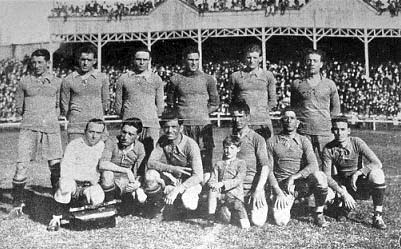
- Boca Juniors, AFA champions
- Season: 1923
- Dates: 11 March 1923 – 27 April 1924
- Champions: Boca Juniors (3rd title)
- Promoted: All Boys; Argentino (B); Argentino (Q); Temperley; Villa Urquiza
- Relegated: (none)
- Top goalscorer: (Argentina) Domingo Tarasconi (40)

As Boca Juniors and Huracán both finished with 51 points each, they had to play a best-of-three playoff to decide a champion. Palermo, which had been relegated from the Asociación Amateur, joined Asociación Argentina remaining at Primera División. Argentino de Quilmes returned to the top division after being relegated in 1918, while All Boys, Argentino de Banfield, and Sportivo Villa Urquiza made their debuts in Primera.

Pos	Team	Pld	W	D	L	GF	GA	GD	Pts
1	Boca Juniors	30	24	3	3	87	19	+68	51
2	Huracán	29	23	5	1	71	20	+51	51
3	Sportivo Barracas	28	18	4	6	60	28	+32	40
4	Dock Sud	28	13	11	4	35	21	+14	37
5	Palermo	25	14	5	6	33	26	+7	33
6	Estudiantes (LP)	22	14	4	4	44	18	+26	32
7	Nueva Chicago	27	13	6	8	36	39	−3	32
8	Argentinos Juniors	28	10	9	9	30	25	+5	29
9	Del Plata	29	10	9	10	34	35	−1	29
10	All Boys	32	10	8	14	31	41	−10	28
11	Temperley	30	11	5	14	36	40	−4	27
12	Progresista	30	10	7	13	44	50	−6	27
13	El Porvenir	33	8	11	14	26	44	−18	27
14	Argentino (Q)	27	11	4	12	27	33	−6	26
15	Platense II (Note: From 1921 to 1925 there were two teams called "Platense" due to an internal conflict in the lists of candidates for president of the institution. Current Club Atlético Platense played at the dissident Asociación Amateur and the other squad (known as "Platense II") played in the Asociación Argentina.)	28	8	10	10	23	30	−7	26
16	Sportivo Palermo	18	9	6	3	27	17	+10	24
17	San Fernando	29	8	7	14	32	45	−13	23
18	Alvear	30	9	5	16	37	56	−19	23
19	Sportivo del Norte	30	6	8	16	30	50	−20	20
20	Argentino (B)	28	6	6	16	37	61	−24	18
21	Boca Alumni	31	6	6	19	32	63	−31	18
22	Villa Urquiza	31	4	8	19	17	41	−24	16
23	Porteño	27	3	8	16	26	53	−27	14

=== Finals ===
After Boca Juniors and Huracán finished tied on points, a two-legged series was established to define a champion.

Series	Team 1	Team 2	Res.	Venue	City
Finals	Boca Juniors	Huracán	3–0	Sportivo Barracas	Buenos Aires
Finals	Boca Juniors	Huracán	0–2	Sportivo Barracas	Buenos Aires
Finals	Boca Juniors	Huracán	2–2	(tied on points)	

With the third match drawn on points (there was no goal difference rule), a playoff was held, finishing 0–0 after extra time so a fourth match –to be played to a finish– was required to determine a champion.

Series	Team 1	Team 2	Res.	Venue	City
Playoff	Boca Juniors	Huracán	0–0 (a.e.t.)	Estadio GEBA	Buenos Aires

Series	Team 1	Team 2	Res.	Venue	City
Playoff 2	Boca Juniors	Huracán	2–0	Sportivo Barracas	Buenos Aires

== Asociación Amateurs de Football ==
Primera División (AAmF)
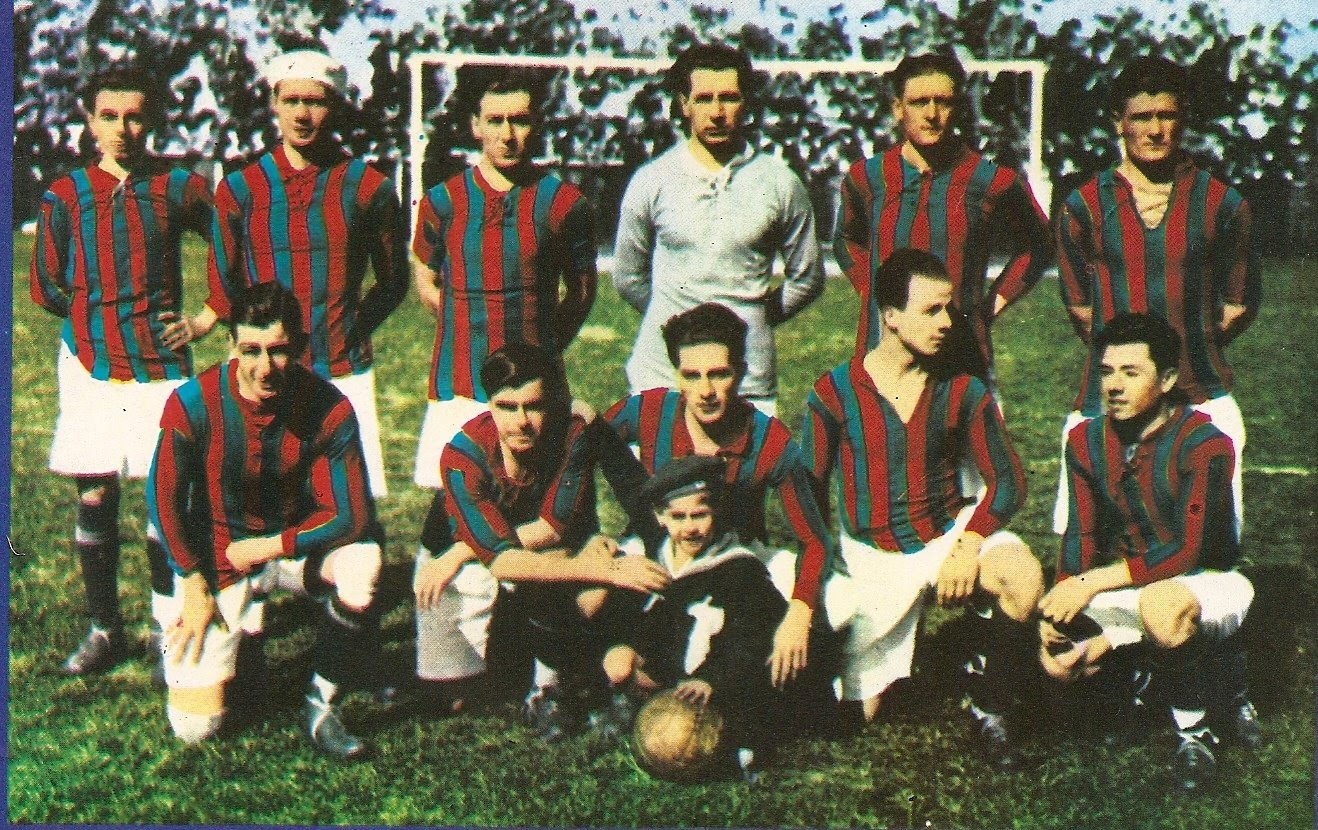
- San Lorenzo, AAmF champions
- Season: 1923
- Dates: 22 July 1923 – 20 January 1924
- Champions: San Lorenzo (1st title)
- Promoted: Argentino del Sud
- Relegated: (none)
- Top goalscorer: (Argentina) Martín Barceló (15)

Argentino del Sud (promoted last year) debuted in Primera División.

Pos	Team	Pld	W	D	L	GF	GA	GD	Pts
1	San Lorenzo (C)	20	17	1	2	34	13	+21	35
2	Independiente	20	15	2	3	40	8	+32	32
3	River Plate	20	14	3	3	29	12	+17	31
4	Racing	20	14	1	5	46	16	+30	29
5	Barracas Central	20	12	4	4	24	13	+11	28
6	Gimnasia y Esgrima (LP)	20	11	2	7	23	14	+9	24
7	Sportivo Almagro	20	6	8	6	20	19	+1	20
8	San Isidro	20	7	5	8	27	24	+3	19
9	Vélez Sarsfield	20	8	3	9	20	25	−5	19
10	Sportivo Buenos Aires	20	8	3	9	21	29	−8	19
11	Argentino del Sud	20	7	5	8	13	19	−6	19
12	Tigre	20	7	4	9	20	25	−5	18
13	Platense	20	6	5	9	20	25	−5	17
14	Quilmes	20	7	2	11	28	33	−5	16
15	Atlanta	20	6	4	10	19	29	−10	16
16	Banfield	20	5	6	9	14	24	−10	16
17	Defensores de Belgrano	20	4	7	9	17	18	−1	15
18	Ferro Carril Oeste	20	6	3	11	12	26	−14	15
19	Estudiantil Porteño	20	3	7	10	17	36	−19	13
20	Estudiantes (BA)	20	2	7	11	12	31	−19	11
21	Lanús	20	2	4	14	17	34	−17	8

(C) Champions
