= 1926 in Argentine football =

Football in Argentina
- Season: 1926

1925 in Argentine football saw Boca Juniors winning its 5th. league title (AFA) while Independiente obtained the AAm championship, achieving the 2nd. title for the club.

== Primera División ==
=== Asociación Argentina de Football - Copa Campeonato ===
All Boys, Colegiales, El Porvenir, Nueva Chicago, Sportivo Barracas and Temperley moved to rival league Asociación Amateurs when most of fixtures had been disputed.

Alvear, Argentino de Banfield, Boca Alumni, Del Plata, General San Martín, Palermo, Progresista, Sportivo Balcarce, Sportivo Dock Sud, Sportsman and Universal were relegated when the associations merged.

No.	Team	Pts.	G	W	D	L	Gf	Ga	Dif.
1	Boca Juniors	32	17	15	2	0	67	4	+63
2	Argentinos Juniors	28	17	12	4	1	26	11	+15
3	Huracán	24	17	11	2	4	37	8	+35
4	Sportivo Balcarce	23	17	10	3	4	29	19	+10
5	Palermo	23	17	10	3	4	28	23	+5
6	Argentino de Banfield	20	17	9	2	6	31	26	+5
7	Chacarita Juniors	18	17	7	4	6	18	16	+2
8	Argentino de Quilmes	18	17	8	2	7	25	30	-5
9	San Fernando	17	17	8	1	8	21	24	-3
10	Boca Alumni	15	17	5	5	7	21	18	-3
11	Sportsman	15	17	5	5	7	17	22	-5
12	Alvear	15	17	5	5	7	13	20	-7
13	Universal	14	17	5	4	8	12	36	-24
14	General San Martín	13	17	5	3	9	15	24	-9
15	Sp. Dock Sud	12	17	5	2	10	22	21	+1
16	Del Plata	9	17	4	1	12	15	43	-28
17	Progresista	8	17	4	0	13	19	20	-1
18	Porteño	2	17	0	2	15	17	68	-51

Champion
Relegated

=== Asociación Amateurs Argentina de Football ===
Talleres (RE), as the 1925 champion, made its debut in Primera División.

No.	Team	Pts.	G	W	D	L	Gf	Ga	Dif
1	Independiente	46	25	21	4	0	75	14	
2	San Lorenzo	45	25	21	3	1	71	21	
3	Platense	37	25	16	5	4	41	18	
4	Racing Club	34	25	16	2	7	51	36	
5	Gimnasia y Esgrima (LP)	33	25	13	7	5	41	27	
6	Lanús	33	25	13	7	5	38	28	
7	Vélez Sarsfield	31	25	10	11	4	38	27	
8	Sportivo Palermo	31	25	14	3	8	51	38	
9	Quilmes	29	25	13	3	9	46	22	
10	Sportivo Almagro	28	25	12	4	9	26	25	
11	River Plate	24	25	10	4	11	32	24	
12	Defensores de Belgrano	24	25	10	4	11	24	32	
13	Tigre	22	25	7	8	10	32	36	
14	Talleres (RE)	22	25	10	2	13	28	36	
15	Estudiantes (LP)	21	25	8	5	12	37	35	
16	Ferro Carril Oeste	20	25	7	6	12	28	37	
17	Barracas Central	19	25	7	5	13	31	42	
18	Estudiantil Porteño	19	25	5	9	11	25	38	
19	Sportivo Buenos Aires	19	25	7	5	13	24	39	
20	Excursionistas	19	25	6	7	12	23	43	
21	Banfield	19	25	5	9	11	16	37	
22	San Isidro	18	25	8	2	15	32	46	
23	Liberal Argentino	18	25	7	4	14	21	37	
24	Estudiantes (BA)	17	25	6	5	14	22	45	
25	Argentino del Sud	14	25	5	4	16	22	56	
26	Atlanta	8	25	1	6	18	22	58	

== Lower divisions ==
=== Primera B ===
- AFA Champion: Nacional (Adrogué)
- AAm Champion: Honor y Patria (Bernal)

=== Primera C ===
- AFA Champion: Libertad
- AAm Champion: Racing III

== Domestic cups ==
=== Copa de Competencia (AAm) ===
- Champion: Independiente

==== Final ====
1927-01-30

Independiente	3-1	Lanús
	Report

n/i

=== Copa Estímulo ===
- Champion: Boca Juniors

==== Final ====
1927-01-30

Boca Juniors	3-1	Sp. Balcarce
	Report

n/i

== Argentina national team ==
Argentina took part in the 1926 Copa América hosted by Chile. The team finished 2nd. to Uruguay.
