= 1926 Argentine Primera División =

35th season of top-tier football league in Argentina

Primera División
- Season: 1926
- Dates: 4 April 1926 – 16 January 1927
- Champions: Boca Juniors (AFA); Independiente (AAmF)

The 1926 Argentine Primera División was the 35th season of top-flight football in Argentina. The AFA championship began on April 18 and ended on January 16, 1927. The AAm season began on April 4 and ended on November 21.

All Boys, Colegiales, El Porvenir, Nueva Chicago, Sportivo Barracas and Temperley moved to rival league Asociación Amateurs when most of fixtures had been disputed. Teams promoted where Sportivo Balcarce (AFA) and Talleres (RE) (AAm).

Boca Juniors won its 5th. league title (AFA) while Independiente obtained the AAm championship, achieving the 2nd. title for the club.

At the end of the season, Alvear, Argentino de Banfield, Boca Alumni, Del Plata, General San Martín, Palermo, Progresista, Sportivo Balcarce, Sportivo Dock Sud, Sportsman and Universal were relegated when the associations merged.

== Final tables ==
=== Asociación Argentina de Football - Copa Campeonato ===
Primera División (AFA)
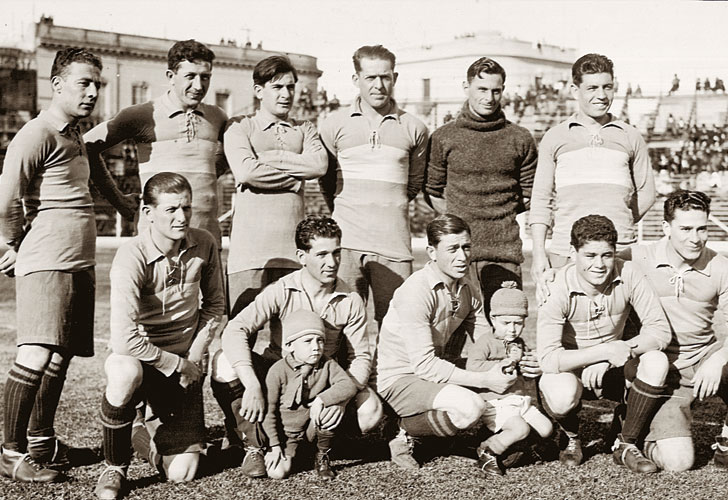
- Boca Juniors, AFA champions
- Season: 1926
- Dates: 18 April 1926 – 16 January 1927
- Champions: Boca Juniors (5th. title)
- Promoted: Sportivo Balcarce
- Relegated: Alvear; Argentino de Banfield; Boca Alumni; Del Plata; General San Martín; Palermo; Progresista; Sportivo Balcarce; Sportivo Dock Sud; Sportsman; Universal
- Top goalscorer: (Argentina) Roberto Cherro (Boca Juniors) (20 goals)
- Biggest home win: –
- Biggest away win: –

Pos	Team	Pld	W	D	L	GF	GA	GD	Pts
1	Boca Juniors (C)	17	15	2	0	67	4	+63	32
2	Argentinos Juniors	17	12	4	1	26	11	+15	28
3	Huracán	17	11	2	4	37	8	+29	24
4	Sportivo Balcarce (R)	17	10	3	4	29	19	+10	23
5	Palermo (R)	17	10	3	4	28	23	+5	23
6	Argentino (B) (R)	17	9	2	6	31	26	+5	20
7	Chacarita Juniors	17	7	4	6	18	16	+2	18
8	Argentino (Q)	17	8	2	7	25	30	−5	18
9	San Fernando	17	8	1	8	21	24	−3	17
10	Boca Alumni (R)	17	5	5	7	21	18	+3	15
11	Sportsman (R)	17	5	5	7	17	22	−5	15
12	Alvear (R)	17	5	5	7	13	20	−7	15
13	Universal (R)	17	5	4	8	12	36	−24	14
14	General San Martín (R)	17	5	3	9	15	24	−9	13
15	Dock Sud (R)	17	5	2	10	22	21	+1	12
16	Del Plata (R)	17	4	1	12	15	43	−28	9
17	Progresista (R)	17	4	0	13	19	20	−1	8
18	Porteño	17	0	2	15	17	68	−51	2

(C) Champions; (R) Relegated

=== Asociación Amateurs de Football ===
Primera División (AAm)
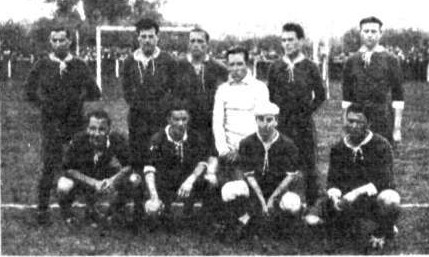
- Independiente, AAmF champions
- Season: 1926
- Dates: 4 April – 21 November
- Champions: Independiente (2nd. title)
- Promoted: Talleres (RE)
- Relegated: (none)
- Top goalscorer: (Argentina) Manuel Seoane (Independiente) (29 goals)

Pos	Team	Pld	W	D	L	GF	GA	GD	Pts
1	Independiente (C)	25	21	4	0	75	14	+61	46
2	San Lorenzo	25	21	3	1	71	21	+50	45
3	Platense	25	16	5	4	41	18	+23	37
4	Racing	25	16	2	7	51	36	+15	34
5	Gimnasia y Esgrima (LP)	25	13	7	5	41	27	+14	33
6	Lanús	25	13	7	5	38	28	+10	33
7	Vélez Sarsfield	25	10	11	4	38	27	+11	31
8	Sportivo Palermo	25	14	3	8	51	38	+13	31
9	Quilmes	25	13	3	9	46	22	+24	29
10	Sportivo Almagro	25	12	4	9	26	25	+1	28
11	River Plate	25	10	4	11	32	24	+8	24
12	Defensores de Belgrano	25	10	4	11	24	32	−8	24
13	Tigre	25	7	8	10	32	36	−4	22
14	Talleres (RE)	25	10	2	13	28	36	−8	22
15	Estudiantes (LP)	25	8	5	12	37	35	+2	21
16	Ferro Carril Oeste	25	7	6	12	28	37	−9	20
17	Barracas Central	25	7	5	13	31	42	−11	19
18	Estudiantil Porteño	25	5	9	11	25	38	−13	19
19	Sportivo Buenos Aires	25	7	5	13	24	39	−15	19
20	Excursionistas	25	6	7	12	23	43	−20	19
21	Banfield	25	5	9	11	16	37	−21	19
22	San Isidro	25	8	2	15	32	46	−14	18
23	Liberal Argentino	25	7	4	14	21	37	−16	18
24	Estudiantes (BA)	25	6	5	14	22	45	−23	17
25	Argentino del Sud	25	5	4	16	22	56	−34	14
26	Atlanta	25	1	6	18	22	58	−36	8

(C) Champions
