= 1924 in Argentine football =

Football in Argentina
- Season: 1924

1924 in Argentine football saw Boca Juniors winning its 4th. league title after a great campaign where the team won 18 over 19 matches disputed, also finishing unbeaten.

On the other hand, dissident AAm tournament was won by San Lorenzo, which obtained its 2nd. consecutive title.

== Primera División ==
=== Asociación Argentina de Football - Copa Campeonato ===
Club Atlético Sportsman made its debut in Primera División.

No.	Team	Pts.	G	W	D	L	Gf	Ga	Dif
1	Boca Juniors	37	19	18	1	0	67	8	+59
2	Temperley	32	21	13	6	2	35	16	+19
3	Dock Sud	29	21	12	5	4	28	16	+12
4	All Boys	29	20	11	7	2	26	15	+11
5	El Porvenir	27	21	11	5	5	32	23	+9
6	Sportivo Barracas	25	21	10	5	6	31	25	+6
7	Huracán	24	18	10	4	4	36	11	+25
8	Nueva Chicago	23	21	8	7	6	27	26	+1
9	Boca Alumni	22	21	8	6	7	23	20	+3
10	San Fernando	21	21	7	7	7	27	26	+1
11	Argentino de Banfield	19	21	8	3	10	33	34	-1
12	Argentinos Juniors	18	21	8	2	11	21	24	-3
13	Platense II	18	21	6	6	9	19	24	-5
14	Sportivo del Norte	18	21	7	4	10	18	24	-6
15	Palermo	18	21	6	6	9	28	38	-10
16	Sportsman	18	20	3	12	5	16	23	-7
17	Argentino de Quilmes	18	21	6	6	9	21	32	-11
18	Alvear	15	20	5	5	10	15	22	-7
19	Porteño	14	20	5	4	11	19	37	-18
20	Progresista	12	20	3	6	11	23	35	-12
21	Del Plata	10	21	4	2	15	21	39	-18
22	Villa Urquiza	5	21	2	1	18	9	57	-48

=== Asociación Amateur de Football ===
Liberal Argentino made its debut in Primera División.

No.	Team	Pts.	G	W	D	L	Gf	Ga	Dif
1	San Lorenzo	39	23	18	3	2	48	15	+33
2	Gimnasia y Esgrima (LP)	37	23	15	7	1	39	9	+30
3	Independiente	36	23	16	4	3	47	9	+38
4	Platense	36	23	14	8	1	30	6	+24
5	River Plate	31	23	13	5	5	30	20	+10
6	Racing Club	30	23	14	2	7	39	16	+23
7	Tigre	29	23	11	7	5	27	19	+8
8	Sportivo Buenos Aires	28	23	10	8	5	35	28	+7
9	San Isidro	27	23	11	5	7	37	29	+8
10	Estudiantes (LP)	26	23	10	6	7	38	24	+14
11	Defensores de Belgrano	25	23	8	9	6	32	26	+6
12	Banfield	23	23	8	7	8	27	28	-1
13	Atlanta	20	23	7	6	10	24	28	-4
14	Sportivo Palermo	19	23	7	5	11	26	43	-17
15	Barracas Central	18	23	6	6	11	21	30	-9
16	Lanús	18	23	6	6	11	18	36	-18
17	Vélez Sarsfield	17	23	6	5	12	26	35	-9
18	Sportivo Almagro	17	23	6	5	12	17	30	-13
19	Estudiantil Porteño	15	23	4	7	12	16	37	-21
20	Liberal Argentino	13	23	4	5	14	17	31	-14
21	Argentino del Sud	12	23	6	2	15	23	35	-12
22	Quilmes	12	23	3	6	14	20	40	-20
23	Ferro Carril Oeste	12	23	4	4	15	16	43	-27
24	Estudiantes (BA)	10	23	3	4	16	16	52	-36

== Lower divisions ==
=== Primera B ===
- AFA Champion: Chacarita Juniors
- AAm Champion: Excursionistas

=== Primera C ===
- AFA Champion: Leandro N. Alem
- AAm Champion: Racing III

== Domestic cups ==
=== Copa Ibarguren ===
- Champion: Boca Juniors
1926-05-03

Boca Juniors	3-2	Belgrano (Rosario)
Tazza 52', Cherro 58', 90'	Report	Bearzotti 16', 30'

Sportivo Barracas

=== Copa de Competencia (AAm) ===
- Champion: Independiente
1925-02-15

Independiente	1-1	Sp. Almagro
	Report

Ferro C. Oeste

1925-02-22

Independiente	0-0	Sp. Almagro
	Report

Banfield

1925-03-01

Independiente	1-0	Sp. Almagro
	Report

Ferro C. Oeste
