= 1922 Argentine Primera División =

31st season of top-tier football league in Argentina

Primera División
- Season: 1922
- Dates: 9 April 1922 – 14 January 1923
- Champions: Huracán (AFA); Independiente (AAmF)

The 1922 Argentine Primera División was the 31st season of top-flight football in Argentina. Huracán won its second consecutive championship, while Independiente obtained its first title, the Asociación Amateurs de Football championship.

== Final tables ==
=== Asociación Argentina de Football - Copa Campeonato ===
Primera División (AFA)
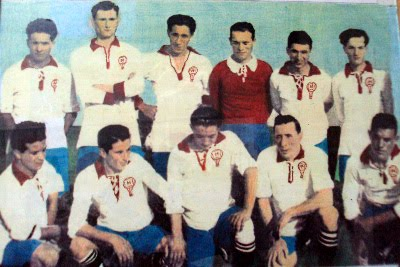
- Huracán, AFA champions
- Season: 1922
- Dates: 23 April 1922 – 14 January 1923
- Champions: Huracán (2nd title)
- Promoted: Alvear; Boca Alumni; San Fernando; Progresista; Dock Sud
- Relegated: (none)
- Top goalscorer: (Argentina) José Clarke (Argentina) Domingo Tarasconi (11 goals each)
- Biggest home win: Huracán 5–0 Sp. Dock Sud (7 May)
- Biggest away win: Porteño 1–5 Del Plata (5 Sep)
- Highest scoring: Del Plata 4–3 Sp. Palermo (19 Nov)

Alvear, Boca Alumni, San Fernando and Progresista made their debuts at the top division of Argentine football.

Pos	Team	Pld	W	D	L	GF	GA	GD	Pts
1	Huracán (C)	16	13	2	1	36	7	+29	28
2	Sportivo Palermo	16	11	3	2	34	14	+20	25
3	Boca Juniors	16	10	2	4	30	19	+11	22
4	Del Plata	16	10	0	6	27	15	+12	20
5	Nueva Chicago	16	7	4	5	23	22	+1	18
6	Argentinos Juniors	16	7	4	5	18	19	−1	18
7	Alvear	16	7	3	6	29	16	+13	17
8	Dock Sud	16	6	4	6	22	23	−1	16
9	Boca Alumni	16	6	3	7	20	22	−2	15
10	Sportivo Barracas	16	4	6	6	18	20	−2	14
11	Estudiantes (LP)	16	4	5	7	20	29	−9	13
12	Sportivo del Norte	16	5	3	8	14	22	−8	13
13	Porteño	16	4	4	8	15	24	−9	12
14	El Porvenir	16	3	6	7	11	20	−9	12
15	San Fernando	16	3	5	8	14	30	−16	11
16	Progresista	16	2	5	9	19	32	−13	9
17	Platense II	16	3	3	10	16	32	−16	9

(C) Champions

=== Asociación Amateurs de Football ===
Primera División (AAmF)
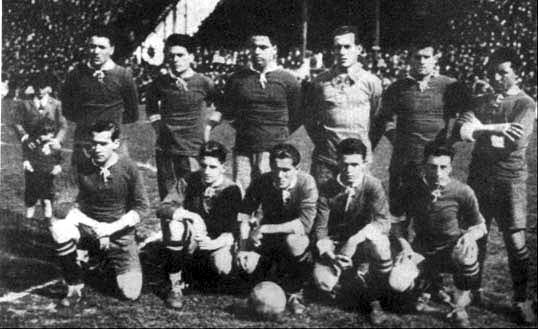
- Independiente, AAmF champions
- Season: 1922
- Dates: 9 Apr 1922 – 13 October 1923
- Champions: Independiente (1st title)
- Promoted: Palermo
- Relegated: Palermo
- Top goalscorer: (Argentina) Manuel Seoane (55)
- Biggest home win: Racing 7–1 Lanús (27 Aug 1922)
- Biggest away win: Quilmes 2–7 Sp. Almagro (29 Mar 1923)

Pos	Team	Pld	W	D	L	GF	GA	GD	Pts
1	Independiente (C)	40	30	5	5	97	27	+70	65
2	River Plate	40	25	11	4	58	18	+40	61
3	San Lorenzo	40	24	12	4	65	25	+40	60
4	Racing	40	23	11	6	65	30	+35	57
5	Gimnasia y Esgrima (LP)	40	22	9	9	52	30	+22	53
6	Platense	40	20	12	8	56	30	+26	52
7	Vélez Sarsfield	40	16	10	14	47	43	+4	42
8	Banfield	40	18	6	16	52	55	−3	42
9	Tigre	40	15	11	14	50	45	+5	41
10	Atlanta	40	14	11	15	42	40	+2	39
11	San Isidro	40	12	11	17	46	51	−5	35
12	Ferro Carril Oeste	40	15	5	20	43	53	−10	35
13	Estudiantil Porteño	40	14	6	20	43	53	−10	34
14	Sportivo Almagro	40	12	10	18	46	58	−12	34
15	Defensores de Belgrano	40	12	8	20	41	55	−14	32
16	Barracas Central	40	10	11	19	35	53	−18	31
17	Sportivo Buenos Aires	40	10	10	20	42	64	−22	30
18	Lanús	40	10	8	22	47	69	−22	28
19	Estudiantes (BA)	40	10	7	23	35	61	−26	27
20	Palermo (Note: Palermo was relegated after a long discussion in the Association - source: Argentina: 1ra. División Asociación Amateurs 1922 at Historia y Futbol) (R)	40	7	7	26	40	85	−45	21
21	Quilmes	40	8	5	27	25	82	−57	21

(C) Champions; (R) Relegated
