= 1922 in Argentine football =

Football in Argentina
- Season: 1922

1922 in Argentine football saw Huracán win its second consecutive championship, while Independiente obtained its first title, the Asociación Amateurs de Football championship.

== Primera División ==
=== Asociación Argentina de Football - Copa Campeonato ===
Alvear, Boca Alumni, San Fernando and Progresista made their debuts at the top division of Argentine football.

Pos	Team	Pts	G	W	D	L	Gf	Ga	Gd
1	Huracán	28	16	13	2	1	36	7	+29
2	Sportivo Palermo	25	16	11	3	2	34	14	+20
3	Boca Juniors	22	16	10	2	4	30	19	+11
4	Del Plata	20	16	10	0	6	27	15	+12
5	Nueva Chicago	18	16	7	4	5	23	22	+1
6	Argentinos Juniors	18	16	7	4	5	18	19	-1
7	Alvear	17	16	7	3	6	29	16	+13
8	Sportivo Dock Sud	16	16	6	4	6	22	23	-1
9	Boca Alumni	15	16	6	3	7	20	22	-2
10	Sportivo Barracas	14	16	4	6	6	18	20	-2
11	Estudiantes (LP)	13	16	4	5	7	20	29	-9
12	Sportivo del Norte	13	16	5	3	8	14	22	-8
13	Porteño	12	16	4	4	8	15	24	-9
14	El Porvenir	12	16	3	6	7	11	20	-9
15	San Fernando	11	16	3	5	8	14	30	-16
16	Progresista	9	16	2	5	9	19	32	-13
17	Platense II	9	16	3	3	10	16	32	

=== Asociación Amateurs de Football ===
Pos	Team	Pts	G	W	D	L	Gf	Ga	Gd
1	Independiente	65	40	30	5	5	97	27	+70
2	River Plate	61	40	25	11	4	58	18	+40
3	San Lorenzo	60	40	24	12	4	65	25	+40
4	Racing Club	57	40	23	11	6	65	30	+35
5	Gimnasia y Esgrima (LP)	53	40	22	9	9	52	30	+25
6	Platense	52	40	20	12	8	56	30	+26
7	Vélez Sarsfield	42	40	16	10	14	47	43	+4
8	Banfield	42	40	18	6	16	52	55	-3
9	Tigre	41	40	15	11	14	50	45	+5
10	Atlanta	39	40	14	11	15	42	40	+2
11	San Isidro	35	40	12	11	17	46	51	-5
12	Ferro Carril Oeste	35	40	15	5	20	43	53	-10
13	Estudiantil Porteño	34	40	14	6	20	43	53	-10
14	Sportivo Almagro	34	40	12	10	18	46	58	-12
15	Defensores de Belgrano	32	40	12	8	20	41	55	-14
16	Barracas Central	31	40	10	11	19	35	53	-18
17	Sportivo Buenos Aires	30	40	10	10	20	42	64	-22
18	Lanús	28	40	10	8	22	47	69	-22
19	Estudiantes (BA)	27	40	10	7	23	35	61	-26
20	Palermo	21	40	7	7	26	40	85	-45
21	Quilmes	21	40	8	5	27	25	82	-57

Champion
Relegated

== Lower divisions ==
=== Primera B ===
- AFA Champion: Boca Juniors II
- AAm Champion: Argentino del Sud

=== Primera C ===
- AFA Champion: Central Argentino
- AAm Champion: Nacional FC

== Domestic cups ==
=== Copa C. Ibarguren ===
- Champion: Huracán
1923-03-04

Huracán	1-1	Newell's
Chiessa 84'	Report	Loyarte 25'

Sportivo Barracas

1923-04-22

Huracán	1-0	Newell's
Chiessa 40'	Report

Sportivo Barracas

== Argentina national team ==
The national team contested 4 competitions in 1922, but could not win any of them.

=== Copa América ===
Argentina was eliminated at semifinals by Paraguay.

=== Copa Lipton ===
Argentina lost to Uruguay 1-0 at Montevideo.

=== Copa Newton ===
In Buenos Aires, Argentina and Uruguay drew 2-2 but Uruguay won the trophy as visiting team.

=== Roca Cup ===
Argentina lost to Brazil 2–1 at São Paulo.
