= 1923 in Argentine football =

Football in Argentina
- Season: 1923

1923 in Argentine football saw Boca Juniors win its 3rd title, the Asociación Argentina championship while San Lorenzo achieved its first title ever at the top division winning the Asociación Amateur championship.

== Primera División ==
=== Asociación Argentina de Football - Copa Campeonato ===
Boca Juniors and Huracán finished with 51 points each so they had to play the playoffs to decide a champion. Palermo, which had been relegated from the Asociación Amateur, joined Asociación Argentina remaining at Primera División. Argentino de Quilmes returned to the top division after being relegated in 1918, while All Boys, Argentino de Banfield and Villa Urquiza made their debuts in Primera.

Pos.	Team	Pts.	G	W	D	L	Gf	Ga	Dif
1	Boca Juniors	51	30	24	3	3	87	19	
1	Huracán	51	29	23	5	1	71	20	
3	Sportivo Barracas	40	28	18	4	6	60	28	
4	Sportivo Dock Sud	37	28	13	11	4	35	21	
5	Palermo	33	25	14	5	6	33	26	
6	Estudiantes (LP)	32	22	14	4	4	44	18	
7	Nueva Chicago	32	27	13	6	8	36	39	
8	Argentinos Juniors	29	28	10	9	9	30	25	
9	Del Plata	29	29	10	9	10	34	35	
10	All Boys	28	32	10	8	14	31	41	
11	Temperley	27	30	11	5	14	36	40	
12	Progresista	27	30	10	7	13	44	50	
13	El Porvenir	27	33	8	11	14	26	44	
14	Argentino de Quilmes	26	27	11	4	12	27	33	
15	Platense II	26	28	8	10	10	23	30	
16	Sportivo Palermo	24	18	9	6	3	27	17	
17	San Fernando	23	29	8	7	14	32	45	
18	Alvear	23	30	9	5	16	37	56	
19	Sportivo del Norte	20	30	6	8	16	30	50	
20	Argentino de Banfield	18	28	6	6	16	37	61	
21	Boca Alumni	18	31	6	6	19	32	63	
22	Villa Urquiza	16	31	4	8	19	17	41	
23	Porteño	14	27	3	8	16	26	53	

==== Final playoffs ====
16 March 1924

Boca Juniors	3-0	Huracán

Sportivo Barracas

30 March 1924

Boca Juniors	0-2	Huracán

Sportivo Barracas

6 April 1924

Boca Juniors	0-0	Huracán

Gimnasia y Esgrima (BA)

With the third match drawn, the best-of-three series was level at 1-1, meaning a fourth match - to be played to a finish - was required to determine the champion.

27 April 1924

Boca Juniors	2-0 (aet)	Huracán
	Report

Sportivo Barracas

=== Asociación Amateur de Football ===
Argentino del Sud (promoted last year) debuted in Primera División.

Pos.	Team	Pts.	G	W	D	L	Gf	Ga	Dif
1	San Lorenzo	35	20	17	1	2	34	13	
2	Independiente	32	20	15	2	3	40	8	
3	River Plate	31	20	14	3	3	29	12	
4	Racing Club	29	20	14	1	5	46	16	
5	Barracas Central	28	20	12	4	4	24	13	
6	Gimnasia y Esgrima (LP)	24	20	11	2	7	23	14	
7	Sportivo Almagro	20	20	6	8	6	20	19	
8	San Isidro	19	20	7	5	8	27	24	
9	Vélez Sarsfield	19	20	8	3	9	20	25	
10	Sportivo Buenos Aires	19	20	8	3	9	21	29	
11	Argentino del Sud	19	20	7	5	8	13	19	
12	Tigre	18	20	7	4	9	20	25	
13	Platense	17	20	6	5	9	20	25	
14	Quilmes	16	20	7	2	11	28	33	
15	Atlanta	16	20	6	4	10	19	29	
16	Banfield	16	20	5	6	9	14	24	
17	Defensores de Belgrano	15	20	4	7	9	17	18	
18	Ferro Carril Oeste	15	20	6	3	11	12	26	
19	Estudiantil Porteño	13	20	3	7	10	17	36	
20	Estudiantes (BA)	11	20	2	7	11	12	31	
21	Lanús	8	20	2	4	14	17	34	

== Lower divisions ==
=== Primera B ===
- AFA Champion: Boca Juniors II
- AAm Champion: Liberal Argentino

=== Primera C ===
- AFA Champion: Bristol
- AAm Champion: Acassuso

== Domestic cups ==
=== Copa Dr. Carlos Ibarguren ===
- Champion: Boca Juniors

==== Final ====
8 June 1924

Boca Juniors	1-0 (aet)	Rosario Central
(Pertini)

Sportivo Barracas

== International cups ==
=== Copa Campeonato del Río de la Plata ===
- Champion: San Lorenzo

==== Final ====
22 June 1924

San Lorenzo (Argentina)	1-0	(Uruguay) Atl. Wanderers

Buenos Aires
