= 1920 in Argentine football =

Football in Argentina
- Season: 1920

1920 in Argentine football saw Boca Juniors retain the "Asociación Argentina de Football" (AFA) league title. In the dissident "Asociación Amateurs de Football" (AAm) River Plate ended the run of seven consecutive league titles for Racing Club de Avellaneda.

In international football Argentina finished as runners up in Copa América 1920.

== Primera División ==
=== Asociación Argentina de Football - Copa Campeonato ===
Club Eureka disappeared when merging with Sportivo Palermo while the Association expanded the number of to 13 clubs participating. Banfield returned to Primera after promoting the last year while Sportivo Barracas came from rival league "Asociación Amateurs de Football". The rest of the teams were promoted to Primera through a resolution by the association, they were Del Plata, Sportivo del Norte (then Colegiales), Nueva Chicago, Lanús, and Sportivo Palermo.

Pos	Team	Pts	G	W	D	L	Gf	Ga	Gd
1	Boca Juniors	43	24	20	3	1	52	7	+45
2	Banfield	31	24	13	5	6	35	21	+14
3	Huracán	31	24	13	5	6	38	26	+12
4	Porteño	30	24	13	4	7	31	26	+5
5	Del Plata	26	24	10	6	8	22	27	-5
6	Sportivo Barracas	25	24	10	5	9	26	28	-2
7	Nueva Chicago	23	24	10	3	11	17	36	-19
8	Sportivo del Norte	22	24	9	4	11	19	47	-28
9	Estudiantes (LP)	21	24	10	1	13	34	37	-3
10	Sportivo Palermo	19	24	8	3	13	26	52	-26
11	Lanús	15	24	5	5	14	26	12	+12
12	Sportivo Almagro	11	24	4	3	17	16	9	7
13	Palermo	9	24	4	1	19	14	28	-14

=== Asociación Amateur de Football - Primera División ===
The tournament started with 17 teams then expanded to 19 when Lanús and Sportivo Almagro (that had previously left the Asociación Argentina) joined the league. Ferro Carril Oeste returned to the league after being relegated 2 years before. Barracas Central debuted in Primera after winning the Primera B (Aam) title last year. Sportivo Buenos Aires also debuted in the top division.

River Plate won its first championship ending with Racing Club run of 7 consecutive titles.

Pos	Team	Pts	G	W	D	L	Gf	Ga	Gd
1	River Plate	56	34	25	6	3	70	22	+48
2	Racing Club	54	34	25	4	5	77	23	+54
3	San Lorenzo	46	34	17	12	5	58	30	+20
4	Atlanta	41	34	17	7	10	49	29	+20
5	Gimnasia y Esgrima (LP)	41	34	17	7	10	46	32	+14
6	Vélez Sársfield	39	34	17	5	12	60	32	+28
7	Platense	37	34	16	5	13	51	39	12
8	Independiente	35	34	12	11	11	58	47	+11
9	San Isidro	33	34	12	9	13	52	53	-1
10	Quilmes	32	34	13	6	15	35	48	-13
11	Estudiantil Porteño	30	34	9	12	13	38	42	-4
12	Ferro Carril Oeste	30	34	12	6	16	34	61	-27
13	Defensores de Belgrano	27	34	9	9	16	28	40	-12
14	Barracas Central	26	34	9	8	17	28	49	-21
15	Tigre	22	34	9	4	21	38	77	-39
16	Sportivo Buenos Aires	18	34	6	6	22	33	64	-31
17	Sportivo Almagro	17	17	6	5	6	22	21	+1
18	Lanús	15	17	6	3	8	14	23	-9
19	Estudiantes (BA)	13	34	4	5	25	31	90	-59

== Lower divisions ==
=== Primera B ===
- AFA Champion: El Porvenir
- AAm Champion: General Mitre

=== Primera C ===
- AFA Champion: Sportivo Avellaneda
- AAm Champion: Oriente del Sud

== Domestic cups ==
=== Copa de Honor MCBA ===
- Champion: Banfield
1921-01-30

Banfield	2-1	Boca Juniors
Pambrún, López	Report	M. Martínez

Sp. Barracas

=== Copa Ibarguren ===
- Champion: Tiro Federal
1921-06-29

Boca Juniors	2-1	Tiro Federal
Calomino 5', Galíndez 52'	Report	Walkens 11'

Sp. Barracas
Referee: Jerónimo Repossi

1922-02-05

Tiro Federal	4-0	Boca Juniors
Walkins 5', Podestá 10', 17', J. Cochrane 75' (pen.)	Report

Boca Juniors
Referee: Servando Pérez

=== Copa de Competencia (AAm) ===
- Champion: Rosario Central
1920-12-21

Rosario Central	2-0	Sp. Almagro
Hayes, Mascías	Report

Gimnasia y Esgrima (BA)

== International cups ==
=== Copa de Honor Cousenier ===
- Champion: (Argentina) Boca Juniors
1923-09-20

Boca Juniors (Argentina)	2-0	(Uruguay) Universal
	Report

(Montevideo)

=== Copa Aldao ===
- Champion: (Uruguay) Nacional
1921-11-20

Nacional (Uruguay)	2-1	(Argentina) Boca Juniors
	Report

(Buenos Aires)

== Argentina national team ==
=== Copa América ===
In 1920 the Argentina national team travelled to Chile to participate in the 4th edition of Copa América. They finished as runners-up to Uruguay for the third time.

=== Titles ===
- Copa Premier Honor Argentino 1920

=== Results ===
Date	Venue	Opponents	Score	Competition	Argentina scorers	Match Report(s)
18 July 1920	Montevideo	Uruguay	2 - 0	Copa Premier Honor Uruguayo
25 July 1920	Buenos Aires	Uruguay	1 - 3	Copa Newton
8 August 1920	Buenos Aires	Uruguay	1 - 0	Copa Premier Honor Argentino
12 September 1920	Viña del Mar	Uruguay	1 - 1	Copa América 1920	Echeverría
20 September 1920	Viña del Mar	Chile	1 - 1	Copa América 1920	Dellavalle
25 September 1920	Viña del Mar	Brazil	0 - 2	Copa América 1920	Echeverría, Libonatti
12 October 1920	Buenos Aires	Brazil	3 - 1	Friendly
