= Alfredo Carricaberry =

Argentine footballer

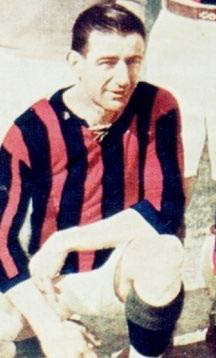
- Carricaberry with San Lorenzo de Almagro.

Personal information
- Full name: Alfredo Demetrio Carricaberry
- Date of birth: 8 October 1900
- Place of birth: Colón, Entre Ríos, Argentina
- Date of death: 23 September 1942 (aged 41)
- Place of death: Buenos Aires, Argentina
- Position: Right winger

Youth career
- Club Floresta
- Estudiantil Porteño

Senior career*
Years	Team	Apps	(Gls)
1919–1930	San Lorenzo	274	(104)
1931	Sp. Palermo		
1932–33	Huracán	17	(1)
1934–35	Estudiantil Porteño	?	(?)
1936	Argentinos Juniors	9	(0)

International career
1922–1931	Argentina	12	(4)
- * Club domestic league appearances and goals

Olympic medal record

Men's Football
Silver medal – second place	1928 Amsterdam	Team competition

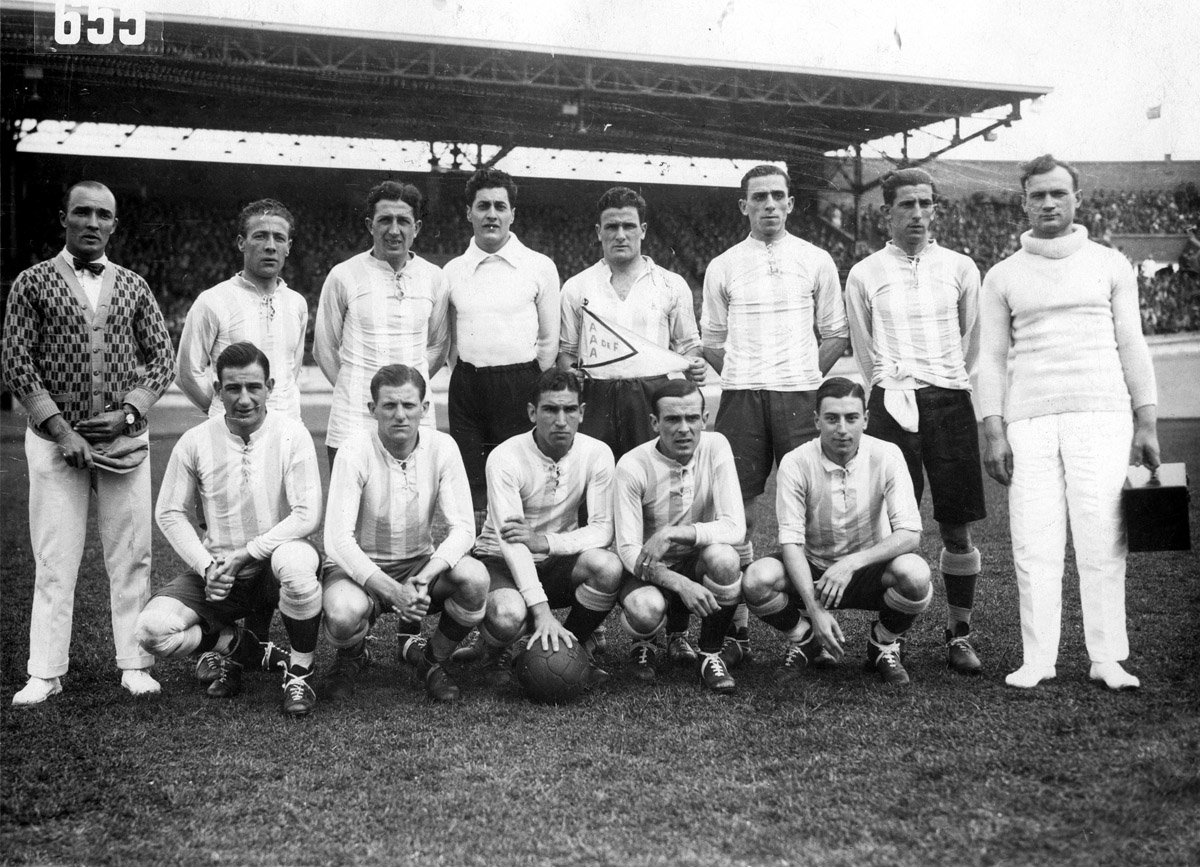
Carricaberry was part of the national team that won the silver medal at the 1928 Olympic Games.

Alfredo Carricaberry (8 October 1900 – 23 September 1942), nicknamed Vasco, was an Argentine football player. Having spent most of his career at San Lorenzo de Almagro, where he won two titles in 1923 and 1924. Caricaberry also played for the Argentina national team, winning the silver medal at the 1928 Olympic Games and one Copa América in 1927.

== Biography ==
Playing in the right winger position, Caricaberry started his career at the youth divisions of Club Floresta of Buenos Aires, then moving to Estudiantil Porteño of Ramos Mejía where he played at intermediate division. In 1919 he joined San Lorenzo de Almagro, where he spent most of his career playing until 1930 with a total of 297 games and 104 goles. Caricaberry remains nowadays as the 5th. player with more games played ever and the 8th. historic topscorer for the club.

He debuted in Primera División in 1920 against Racing Club, scoring a goal although San Lorenzo lost by 2–1. The first league title with the club came in 1923, being also team's topscorer. The following year San Lorenzo won its second consecutive championship.

Carricaberry debuted in the Argentina national team in November 1922 versus Uruguay in Montevideo. Argentina lost by 2–1 with Carricaberry scoring the only goal for the Argentine side. In 1927 Argentina played two friendly matches against Real Madrid in Buenos Aires. In the second game (won by Argentina 3–2) Carricaberry scored two goals.

San Lorenzo won another league title in 1927, with Caricaberry as team's topscorer again. He remained in the club until 1932 when is transferred to San Lorenzo's arch-rival, Huracán. He played one season there, scoring only one goal. Caricaberry's last club was Argentinos Juniors, where he retired from football in 1937.

Carricaberry's main achievements with the national team were the 1927 South American championship hosted in Peru, with Argentina being champion and he as topscorer. The next year, Argentina won the silver medal at the 1928 Summer Olympics. Argentina played 5 matches, losing the final to Uruguay. Carricaberry was the left winger of the team.

Caricaberry died on 23 September 1942, while descending from a Línea 100 colectivo after suffering a heart attack. He was only 41 years old. It was diagnosed that the cause of death was his addiction to tobacco.

== Honours ==
=== Club ===
San Lorenzo

- Primera División (3): 1923, 1924, 1927

=== National team ===
Argentina

- Copa América (1): 1927
- 1928 Olympic Silver Medal
