= 1921 in Argentine football =

Football in Argentina
- Season: 1921

1921 in Argentine football saw Huracán winning its first Asociación Argentine title while Racing Club won the dissident Asociación Amateur championship.

== Primera División ==
=== Asociación Argentina de Football - Copa Campeonato ===
Banfield disaffiliated from the association moving to the rival Asociación Amateurs de Football with a few fixtures disputed.

| No. | Team | Pts | G | W | D | L | Gf | Ga | P |
|---|---|---|---|---|---|---|---|---|---|
| 1 | Huracán | 31 | 18 | 14 | 3 | 1 | 54 | 15 | +39 |
| 2 | Del Plata | 28 | 18 | 12 | 4 | 2 | 27 | 11 | +28 |
| 3 | Boca Juniors | 25 | 18 | 10 | 5 | 3 | 30 | 17 | +25 |
| 4 | Nueva Chicago | 19 | 18 | 6 | 7 | 5 | 13 | 12 | +19 |
| 5 | El Porvenir | 19 | 18 | 6 | 7 | 5 | 17 | 22 | +19 |
| 6 | Sportivo del Norte | 16 | 18 | 4 | 8 | 6 | 17 | 22 | +16 |
| 7 | Sportivo Barracas | 14 | 18 | 5 | 4 | 9 | 22 | 31 | +14 |
| 8 | Estudiantes (LP) | 13 | 18 | 5 | 3 | 10 | 17 | 34 | +13 |
| 9 | Sportivo Palermo | 10 | 18 | 3 | 4 | 11 | 14 | 28 | +10 |
| 10 | Porteño | 5 | 18 | 0 | 5 | 13 | 10 | 29 | +5 |

=== Asociación Amateurs de Football ===
Racing Club won its 8th title. General Mitre, which had debuted at Primera after promoting last year, was expelled from the association after playing 17 fixtures and all its matches annulled.

| No. | Team | Pts. | G | W | D | L | Gf | Ga | Dif |
|---|---|---|---|---|---|---|---|---|---|
| 1 | Racing Club | 66 | 38 | 30 | 6 | 2 | 73 | 16 | +57 |
| 2 | River Plate | 54 | 38 | 25 | 4 | 9 | 69 | 30 | +39 |
| 3 | Independiente | 53 | 38 | 22 | 9 | 7 | 62 | 28 | +34 |
| 4 | Gimnasia y Esgrima (LP) | 52 | 38 | 23 | 6 | 9 | 64 | 39 | +25 |
| 5 | Defensores de Belgrano | 48 | 38 | 20 | 8 | 10 | 42 | 28 | +14 |
| 6 | San Lorenzo de Almagro | 47 | 38 | 20 | 7 | 11 | 47 | 25 | +22 |
| 7 | Tigre | 43 | 38 | 15 | 13 | 10 | 61 | 53 | +8 |
| 8 | Platense | 42 | 38 | 16 | 10 | 12 | 63 | 38 | +25 |
| 9 | Atlanta | 41 | 38 | 17 | 7 | 14 | 47 | 44 | +3 |
| 10 | Banfield | 38 | 38 | 16 | 6 | 16 | 47 | 43 | +4 |
| 11 | Barracas Central | 37 | 38 | 15 | 7 | 16 | 47 | 47 | 0 |
| 12 | Vélez Sarsfield | 36 | 38 | 13 | 10 | 15 | 53 | 43 | +20 |
| 13 | Sportivo Almagro | 34 | 38 | 14 | 6 | 18 | 40 | 54 | -14 |
| 14 | Estudiantes (BA) | 32 | 38 | 12 | 8 | 18 | 38 | 57 | -19 |
| 15 | Lanús | 28 | 38 | 10 | 8 | 20 | 33 | 60 | -27 |
| 16 | Sportivo Buenos Aires | 27 | 38 | 8 | 11 | 19 | 38 | 62 | -24 |
| 17 | Quilmes | 25 | 38 | 8 | 9 | 21 | 43 | 65 | -22 |
| 18 | Estudiantil Porteño | 24 | 38 | 9 | 6 | 23 | 38 | 58 | -20 |
| 19 | San Isidro | 22 | 38 | 8 | 6 | 24 | 33 | 78 | -45 |
| 20 | Ferro Carril Oeste | 11 | 38 | 2 | 7 | 29 | 22 | 92 | -70 |

== Lower divisions ==
=== Primera B ===
- AFA Champion: Sportivo Dock Sud
- AAm Champion: Palermo

=== Primera C ===
- AFA Champion: Huracán III
- AAm Champion: Villa Crespo

== Domestic cups ==
=== Copa de Competencia Jockey Club ===
- Champion: Sportivo Barracas

==== Final ====
3 December 1922

| Sportivo Barracas | 2-1 | Nueva Chicago |
|---|---|---|
| | Report |

Del Plata

=== Copa Ibarguren ===
- Champion: Newell's

==== Final ====
29 January 1922

| Newell's | 3-0 | Huracán |
|---|---|---|
| Badalini 25', 31'; Libonatti 44' | Report |

Boca Juniors
