= Domingo Tarasconi =

Argentine footballer (1903–1991)

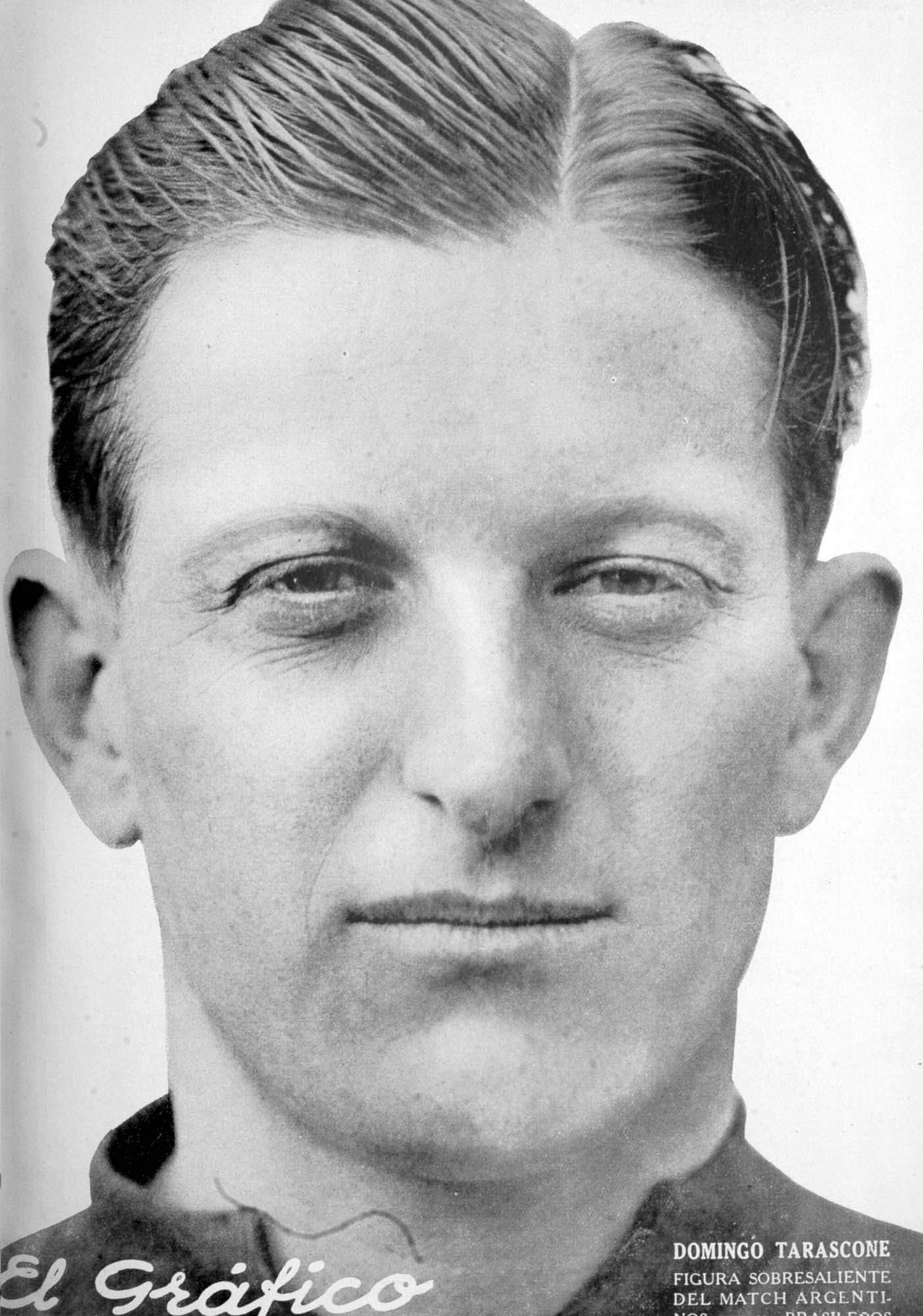
- Tarasconi covered on El Gráfico in 1925

Personal information
- Full name: Domingo Alberto Tarasconi
- Date of birth: 20 December 1903
- Place of birth: Buenos Aires, Argentina
- Date of death: 3 July 1991 (aged 87)
- Place of death: Buenos Aires
- Position: Forward

Senior career*
Years	Team	Apps	(Gls)
1918–1921	Atlanta	46	(65)
1922–1942	Boca Juniors	471	(440)

International career
1919–1932	Argentina	65	(52)
Medal record
Men's football
Representing Argentina
Olympic Games
Silver medal – second place	1928 Amsterdam	Team
- * Club domestic league appearances and goals

Domingo Alberto Tarasconi (20 December 1903 – 3 July 1991) was an Argentine football forward. Raising from Club Atlético Atlanta, he played most of his career for Boca Juniors where he won 9 official titles and became the all-time 4th highest scorer in the club's history, behind Martín Palermo, Roberto Cherro, and Francisco Varallo.

Apart from those achievements with the club, Tarasconi was Primera División topscorer on five occasions between 1922 and 1934, being also one of the all-time top scorers in the league, having scored 208 goals in 289 matches between 1921 and 1934.

Tarasconi also played for the Argentina national football team, winning the silver medal and being topscorer of the Summer Olympics held in Amsterdam in 1928 with 11 goals in 4 matches. His outstanding performance in the competition still holds a record. With Argentina, he also won two Copa América titles in 1925, and 1929.

Tarasconi was also mentioned in the tango Patadura, released in 1928 and performed by legend Carlos Gardel.

== Career ==
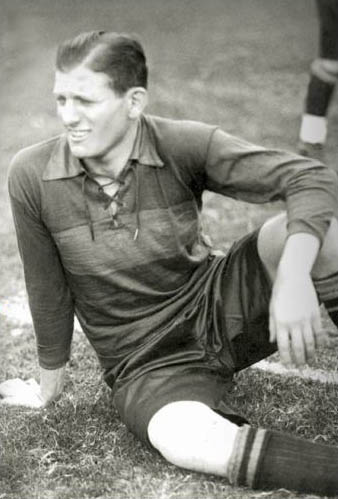
Tarasconi with Boca Juniors, where he played 10 years becoming one of the all-time top scorers of the club

Tarasconi's first steps in football were in Atlanta, where he debuted in 1921. One season later he moved to Boca Juniors where he became one of the all-time top scorers not only of the club but of Primera División. During his ten years in the team, Tarasconi played 226 official matches, scoring 186 goals. He also won 9 titles with Boca Juniors.

He scored 7 goals in the successful 1925 tour to Europe being the 2nd scorer of the tour behind Manuel Seoane. He was also top scorer of Primera División in 1922, 1923, 1924, and 1927.

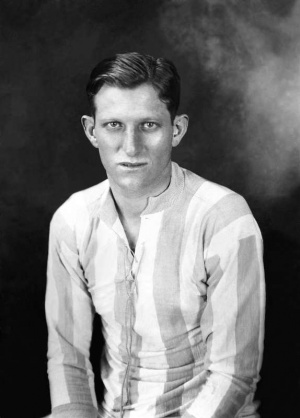
Tarasconi with the Argentina national team, where he was the topscorer at the 1928 Summer Olympics

After Tarasconi left Boca Juniors in 1932 there are no records of any match played by him until 1934 where he joined Sportivo Barracas, which played in the official association (AFA) that remained amateur opposed to dissident Liga Argentina de Football (LAF), the first professional league in the country. Tarasconi only played 6 matches there with no goals scored before moving to General San Martín (Note: Some sources say San Martín de Tucumán which is incorrect. The team where Tarasconi played were a club located in General San Martín Partido of Greater Buenos Aires.), where he played 20 matches with 16 goals within the same season.

In 1935 Tarasconi moved to Sportivo Barracas, finishing his career in Argentinos Juniors, where he played 8 matches in the 1936 season before retiring from the activity.

Tarasconi won 9 titles with Boca Juniors and two Copa América with the Argentina national team. He played 24 games for Argentina, netting 18 goals between 1922 and 1929. He also played in the 1928 Olympic games where he finished as tournament top scorer. Tarasconi is still the 13th highest scoring player in the history of the Argentina national football team.

== Titles ==
=== Boca Juniors ===
- Primera División (5): 1923, 1924, 1926, 1930, 1931 LAF
- Copa Ibarguren (2): 1923, 1924
- Copa Competencia Jockey Club (1): 1925
- Copa Estímulo (1): 1926

=== Argentina ===
- Copa América (2): 1925, 1929
- Summer Olympics (1): 1928 Silver Medal

=== Individual ===
- Topscorer:
  - 1928 Summer Olympics (11 goals)
  - Primera División: 1922, 1923, 1924, 1927, 1934

== In popular culture ==
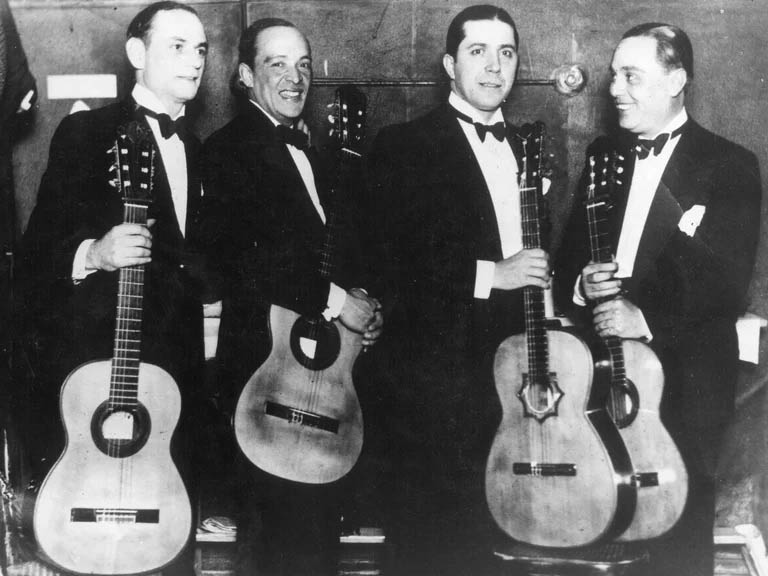
Carlos Gardel (third from left) recorded the song Patadura in 1928 with the guitar trio that used to perform with him

Tango singer and legend Carlos Gardel performed the song Patadura, a humorous tango released in 1928 that used football as a metaphor to describe to ineptitude of the person described in the song. The word patadura is a local term currently used to describe a person with no skills to play football.

The song (with lyrics by Enrique Carreras Sotelo and music by José López Ares) named Tarasconi (calling him by his nickname Tarasca) "to score a goal from the middle of the field", referring to Tarasconi's strong shot and accuracy. Other notable footballers of those times mentioned in the song are Manuel Seoane, Luis Monti, Pedro Ochoa (who was also friend of Gardel, who composed the tango Ochoíta in his honor).

Gardel then recorded a new version of Patadura in 1929 in Paris, where the lyrics where slightly changed replacing the original Argentine men's footballers by players of FC Barcelona (Vicente Piera, Ricardo Zamora, Josep Samitier, Franz Platko) with whom Gardel had established a friendship (especially with Samitier) as part of becoming a fan of the team. Gardel was also honorary member of the club, having attended some matches such as the 1928 Copa del Rey Final.

== See also ==
- List of footballers who achieved hat-trick records
