= Ramón Muttis =

Argentine footballer (1899–1992)

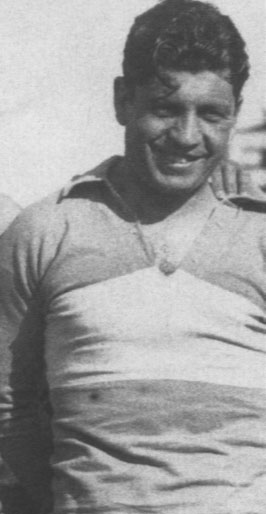
- Muttis in 1923

Personal information
- Full name: Ramón Alfredo Muttis
- Date of birth: 12 March 1899
- Place of birth: Buenos Aires, Argentina
- Date of death: 12 January 1992 (aged 92)
- Place of death: Córdoba, Argentina
- Height: 1.82 m (5 ft 11 1/2 in)
- Position: Central defender

Senior career*
Years	Team	Apps	(Gls)
1918–1919	Wanderers	?	(?)
1920–1922	Atlanta	?	(?)
1923–1932	Boca Juniors	237	(3)
1936-1937	Argentinos Juniors	32	(0)
1937	Almagro	6	(0)
1938	Argentinos Juniors	6	(0)

International career
1923–1930	Argentina	11	(0)

Managerial career
- 1940: Argentinos Juniors
Medal record
Men's Football
Representing Argentina
Copa América
Winner	1925 Argentina	Team
FIFA World Cup
Runner-up	1930 Uruguay	Team
- * Club domestic league appearances and goals

Ramón Alfredo Muttis (12 March 1899 – 12 January 1992) was an Argentine football defender who spent most of his career with Boca Juniors. He also played for the Argentina national team winning the 1925 South American Championship.

Muttis (sometimes recorded as Mutis) started his career with Argentine club Wanderers. In 1920, he joined Club Atlético Atlanta where he was part of the team that won the Copa de Honor in 1920.

Muttis joined Boca Juniors in 1923, the same year that he made his international debut. He won a total of 9 championships with the club. Muttis made a total of 237 appearances for Boca Juniors, spanning ten seasons earning the nickname "Ramón el Fuerte (Ramón the Strong)".

Muttis played in two editions of the Copa América, winning the tournament in 1925 and finishing second in 1926. He was part of the Argentina squad for the 1930 FIFA World Cup but he only played in one game, against France.

Muttis retired in 1932 but came out of retirement in 1936 to play for Argentinos Juniors. He went on to become player-manager of Almagro leading them to the 2nd Division championship in 1937 and in 1940 he was the manager of the Argentinos Juniors squad that won the 2nd division championship.

== Titles ==
=== Club ===
Boca Juniors

- Primera División (5): 1923, 1924, 1926, 1930, 1931
- Copa Ibarguren (2): 1923, 1924
- Copa de Competencia Jockey Club (1): 1925
- Copa Estímulo (1): 1926
- Copa de Honor Cousenier (1): 1920

=== National team ===
Argentina

- Copa América (1): 1925
- FIFA World Cup runner-up: 1930
