= División Intermedia =

División Intermedia may refer to:

- Paraguayan División Intermedia, second division of Paraguayan football, played since 1910;
- Argentine División Intermedia, old division of Argentine football corresponding to the second category from 1911 to 1926, and to the third category from 1927 to 1932.
