= Argentine División Intermedia =

División Intermedia
- Founded: 1911
- Folded: 1932; 94 years ago
- Country: Argentina
- Confederation: AFA
- Level on pyramid: 2 (1911–26); 3 (1927–32)
- Promotion to: Primera División (1911–26); Segunda División (1927–32)
- Relegation to: Segunda División (1911–26); Tercera División (1927–32)
- Most championships: Boca Juniors (Note: As the senior team was competing in Primera División, the club played the second division with reserve teams.); Defensores de Belgrano (2 titles each)

División Intermedia was one of the divisions that formed the Argentine football league system. Established by the Argentine Association in 1911 as the second level, teams that won the championship promoted directly to Primera División. With the creation of División Intermedia, Primera B become the third division.

Tournaments organised by dissident body Asociación Amateurs de Football (established in 1919) were named "Extra" in contrast with the "Intermedia" division by official Association. When both leagues merged in 1926, Segunda División became the second level again, and División Intermedia was moved to the third level of the league system. This lasted until 1932 when the Argentine Association eliminated two divisions (including División Intermedia) due to a restructuring of the system.

== Division levels ==
Year	Level	Promotion to	Relegation to
1911–1926	2	Primera División	Segunda División
1927–1932	3	Segunda División	Tercera División

== List of champions ==
The División Intermedia was the second level of Argentine football (1911–26) then becoming the third (1927–32) until its dissolution.

Ed.	Season	Champion	Runner-up
As Second Division tournament
1	1911	Estudiantes (LP) (1)	Independiente
2	1912	Ferro Carril Oeste (1)	Platense
2	1912 FAF (Note: The Federación Argentina de Football (FAF) was a rival association that organized its own championships from 1912 to 1914.)	Tigre (1)	Hispano Argentino
3	1913	Huracán (1)	Gimnasia y Esgrima (Flores)
3	1913 FAF	Floresta (1)	General Belgrano
4	1914	Honor y Patria (Floresta) (Note: Club based in Floresta, Buenos Aires and founded in 1905. Although the team won the title, it lost promotion to Primera after being beaten by San Lorenzo de Almagro 3–0. This club (disestablished in 1920) has been often confused with Club Honor y Patria from Bernal.) (1)	
4	1914 FAF	Defensores de Belgrano (1)	Burzaco
5	1915	Gimnasia y Esgrima (LP) (1)	Honor y Patria (Floresta)
6	1916	Sportivo Barracas (1)	Buenos Aires Isla Maciel
7	1917	Defensores de Belgrano (2)	Vélez Sarsfield
8	1918	Eureka (1)	Almagro
9	1919	Banfield (1)	Del Plata
9	1919 AAm (Note: The Asociación Amateurs de Football (Aam) was a rival association that organized its own championships from 1919 to 1926. Second division championships organised by the body were named "Extra".)	Barracas Central (1)	Quilmes
10	1920	El Porvenir (1)	Argentinos Juniors
10	1920 AAm	General Mitre (1)	Liberal Argentino
11	1921	Dock Sud (1)	Liniers
11	1921 AAm	Palermo (1)	Villa Ballester
12	1922	Boca Juniors II (1)	All Boys
12	1922 AAm	Argentino del Sud (1)	Villa Ballester
13	1923	Boca Juniors II	Sportsman
13	1923 AAm	Liberal Argentino (1)	Talleres (RE)
14	1924	Chacarita Juniors (1)	Bristol
14	1924 AAm	Excursionistas (1)	Talleres (RE)
15	1925	Sportivo Balcarce (1)	
15	1925 AAm	Talleres (RE) (1)	San Telmo
16	1926	Nacional (Adrogué) (1)	
16	1926 AAm	Honor y Patria (Bernal) (1)	San Telmo
As Third Division tournament
17	1927	Unión (Caseros) (1)	Liniers
18	1928	Acassuso (1)	Caseros
19	1929	Gimnasia y Esgrima (Lanús) (1)	Libertad
20	1930	La Paternal (1)	Barracas Juniors
21	1931	25 de Mayo (1)	Albión
21	1931 LAF (Note: The Liga Argentina de Football (LAF) was a dissident professional association that organized its own championships from 1931 to 1934, when it merged the official body (AFA).)	(Not held)	
22	1932	Sportivo Alsina (1)	
22	1932 LAF	(Not held)	

== See also ==
- Primera B Metropolitana
- Argentine football league system
