= Copa de Competencia (Asociación Amateurs) =

- Organiser(s): AAmF
- Founded: 1920
- Abolished: 1926; 100 years ago
- Region: Argentina
- Teams: 32 (1926)
- Related competitions: Copa Presidente de la Nación
- Last champions: Independiente (1926)
- Most championships: Independiente (3 titles)

The Copa de Competencia was an official Argentine football cup competition contested between 1920 and 1926. It was established by the "Asociación Amateurs de Football", a dissident body formed a year before. The Associación Amateurs organized its own championships until 1926 when it merged to official Asociación Argentina.

Unlike the Copa de Competencia Jockey Club, this Cup did not qualify any team to play an international match because it had been created by a dissident league (clubs registered to AFA played against the Uruguayan Football Association champions).

The inaugural edition of the cup was contested by 21 clubs from dissident leagues of Buenos aires and Rosario. From 1924 to its end, the tournament was played by teams from Buenos Aires only due to the Rosario representatives had joined Liga Rosarina de Football.

== List of champions ==
=== Finals ===
The following list includes all the editions of the Copa de Competencia:

Ed.	Year	Champion	Score	Runner-up	Venue	City
1	1920	Rosario Central (1)	2–0	Sportivo Almagro	GEBA	Buenos Aires
2	1924	Independiente (1)	1–1	Sportivo Almagro	Independiente	Avellaneda
2	1924	Independiente (1)	0–0 (Note: First playoff.)	Sportivo Almagro	Banfield (Note: The first venue of the club before Estadio Florencio Sola was built.)	Banfield
2	1924	Independiente (1)	1–0 (Note: Second playoff.)	Sportivo Almagro	Platense (Note: On Manuela Pedraza and Cramer streets.)	Buenos Aires
3	1925	Independiente (2)	2–0	Sportivo Palermo	River Plate	Buenos Aires
4	1926	Independiente (3)	3–1	Lanús	Sportivo Barracas	Buenos Aires

=== Titles by club ===
Club	Titles	Years won
Independiente	3	1924, 1925, 1926
Rosario Central	1	1920

=== Topscorers ===
Year	Player	Goals	Club
1920	(Argentina) Ildefonso Alzúa	4	San Isidro
1924	(Argentina) Pedro De Sarrasqueta	8	Estudiantil Porteño
1924	(Argentina) Pasqual Licciardi	8	River Plate
1925	(Argentina) Raimundo Orsi	8	Independiente
1926	(Argentina) Nicanor Moro	7	Liberal Argentino

== See also ==
- Copa Presidente de la Nación
- Asociación Amateurs de Football
