= Asociación Amateurs de Football =

Argentinean dissident football association

Argentina
- Founded: 22 September 1919
- Folded: 28 November 1926; 99 years ago
- Headquarters: Buenos Aires
- FIFA affiliation: No
- President: Juan Mignaburu (1919); A. Beccar Varela (1920–26)

The Asociación Amateurs de Football (AAmF) was a dissident football association of Argentina that organised its own championships from 1919 to 1926. The Argentine Football Association did not recognise those championships until both associations were merged in 1926. Currently all the championships organised by the AAmF are considered official by the AFA.

== History ==
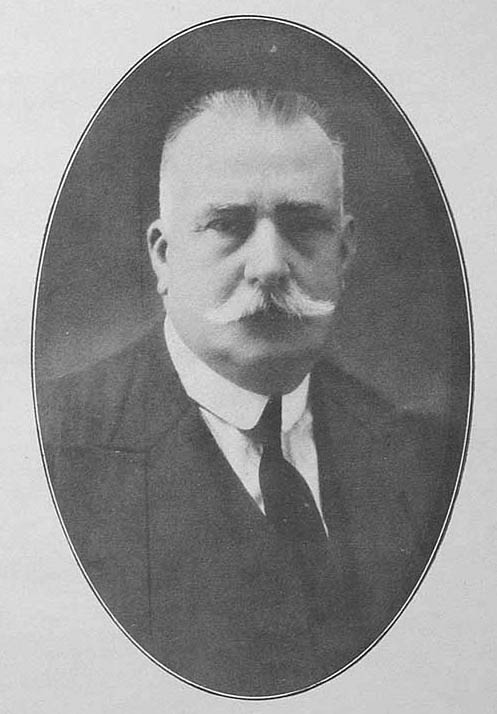
Juan Mignaburu, first president of the AAmF

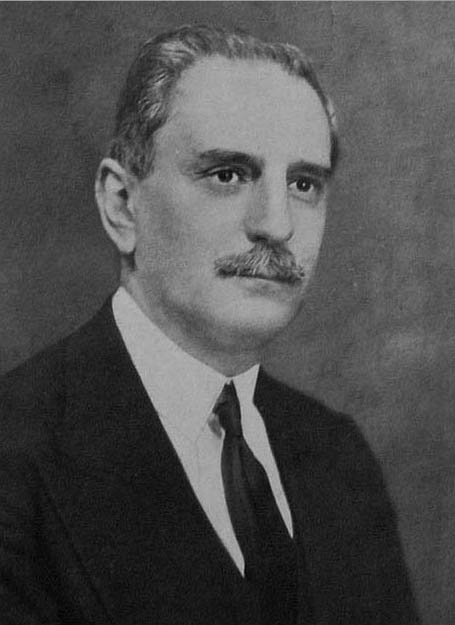
Adrián Beccar Varela presided from 1920 to 1926

On 16 March 1919, the Primera División season started with 19 teams taking part. With the 1919 championship still disputing, the conflict began. The Argentine Association rejected representatives from the clubs Estudiantil Porteño, Independiente, Platense, Racing, River Plate and Tigre. As those teams maintained their position, the Association disaffiliated them temporarily.

Meanwhile, seven other clubs, Atlanta, Defensores de Belgrano, Estudiantes (BA), Gimnasia y Esgrima (LP), San Isidro, San Lorenzo and Sportivo Barracas, expressed their solidarity with the suspended clubs; therefore, the association directly expelled them With only 10 fixtures played, the championship was suspended and all the matches played until then were annulled. The breakage was related to (among other reasons) the brown amateurism, an undercover way of professionalism where the clubs informally paid salaries and special prizes to their players.

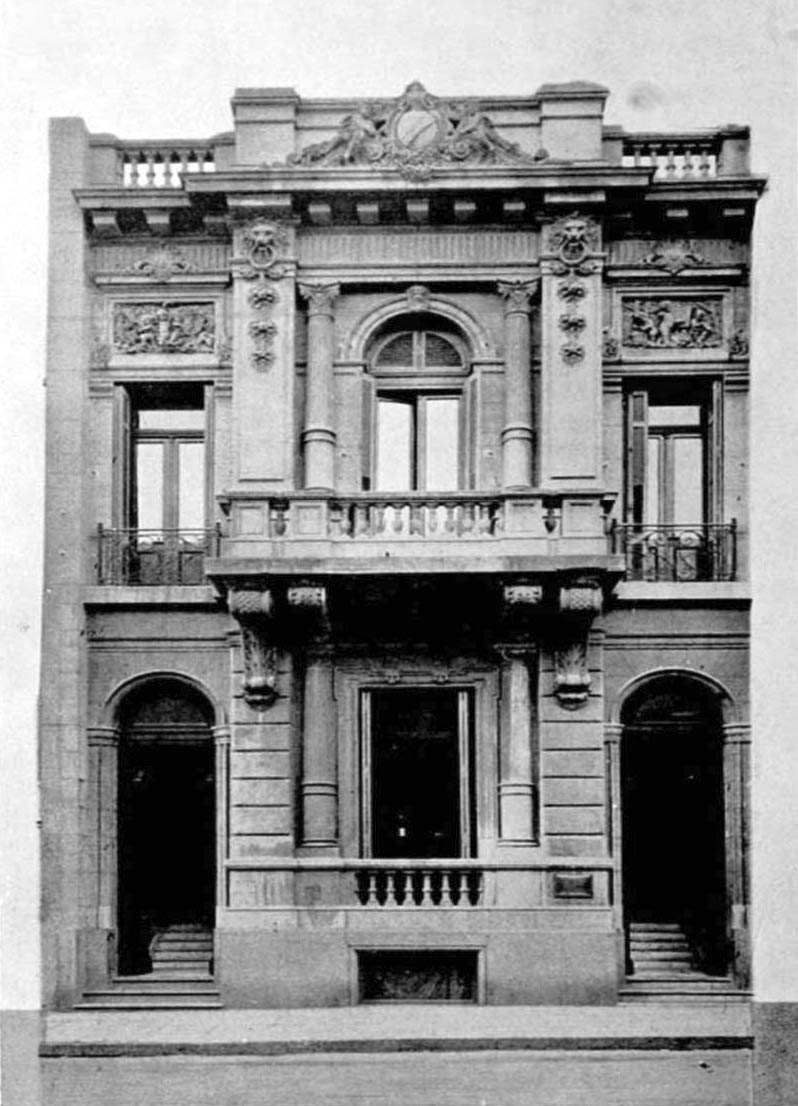
AAmF building on Viamonte street, acquired in 1924. It was then seat of the AFA until its demolition in the 1940s.

The 13 clubs that had been disaffiliated or expelled from the AFA joined forces to form a new association with the purpose to organise their own championships. The "Asociación Amateurs de Football" was officially established on 22 September 1919, with an assembly held in the Jockey Club on 6 December.

On the other hand, Boca Juniors, Estudiantes (LP), Eureka, Huracán, Porteño and Sportivo Almagro remained affiliated to the official body. On 28 September, both competitions started, the official (AFA) with only those six teams and the dissident (AAmF) with 14 teams (including the addition of Vélez Sarsfield).

Because of the conflict that made the official championship take longer than expected, the AFA tournament was ended. As a result, Boca Juniors (which was placed 1st at the moment of the decision) was crowned champion with 14 matches yet to be played. The AAmF championship was won by Racing Club.

After seven years of championships held that included the trespassing of clubs from a body to another, on 19 November 1926, President of Argentina Marcelo T. de Alvear called both associations to a reconciliation meeting that laid the foundations for a reunification. As a condition to reach an agreement, the AAmF required that all the teams that had played the 1926 AAmF championship (26 in total) remained in Primera División. This was conceded, and the two associations finally merged on 28 December 1926.

== Founding members ==
- Atlanta
- Defensores de Belgrano
- Estudiantes (BA)
- Excursionistas
- Gimnasia y Esgrima (LP)
- Independiente
- Platense
- Racing
- River Plate
- Sportivo Barracas
- San Isidro
- San Lorenzo
- Tigre

== Competitions ==
The AAmF organised several competitions, as listed below:

=== Domestic ===
- Primera División (1919–26)
- División Intermedia (1919–26)
- Segunda División (1919–26)
- Tercera División (1919–26)
- Copa Competencia (1920–26)
- Copa Presidente de la Nación (1919–26) (Note: Since 1927, organised by AFA)

=== International ===
- Copa Campeonato del Río de la Plata (1923) (Note: Organised jointly by AAmF and Uruguayan Football Federation)

== Champions ==
=== Primera División ===
Season	Champion
1919	Racing
1920	River Plate
1921	Racing
1922	Independiente
1923	San Lorenzo
1924	San Lorenzo
1925	Racing
1926	Independiente

=== División Intermedia ===
Season	Champion
1919	Barracas Central
1920	General Mitre
1921	Palermo
1922	Argentino del Sud
1923	Liberal Argentino
1924	Excursionistas
1925	Talleres (BA)
1926	Honor y Patria

=== Segunda División ===
Season	Champion
1919	Sportivo Barracas III (Note: Reserve teams)
1920	Oriente del Sud
1921	Villa Crespo
1922	Nacional (Adrogué)
1923	Acassuso
1924	Racing III
1925	Perla del Plata
1926	Racing III

=== Tercera División ===
Season	Champion
1919	Racing III
1920	Estudiantil Porteño
1921	Almagro
1922	Vélez Sarsfield
1923	Platense
1924	Platense
1925	Sportivo Alsina
1926	Platense

=== Copa de Competencia ===
Season	Champion
1920	Rosario Central
1924	Independiente
1925	Independiente
1926	Independiente

== See also ==
- Federación Argentina de Football
- Liga Argentina de Football
- Football in Argentina
