= Club Atlético Alvear =

Alvear
- Full name: Club Atlético Alvear
- Founded: 1 July 1903
- Dissolved: 1930s
- Ground: Saavedra, Buenos Aires; Argentina
- League: Primera B
- 1927: 14th
Home colours

Club Atlético Alvear (or "Club Alvear") was an Argentine football club affiliated to Argentine Football Association during the 1920s and 1930s. Alvear had its headquarters in Villa Crespo and its field in Saavedra, both neighborhoods in the city of Buenos Aires.

== History ==
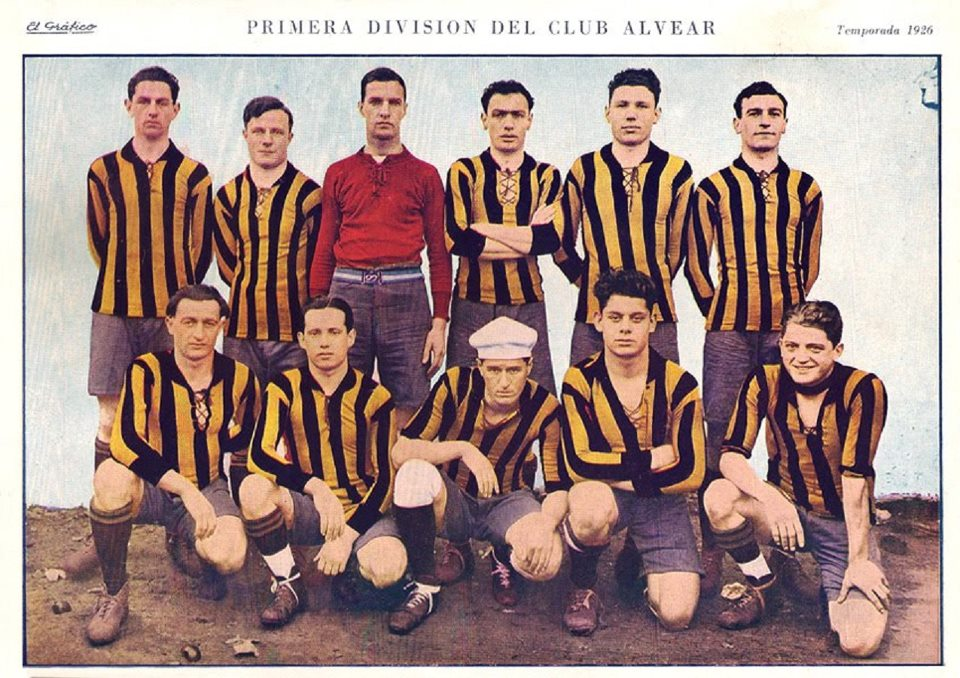
Alvear team of 1926

The club was established on July 1, 1903, as "Club Atlético Alvear" in the Villa Crespo district of Buenos Aires.

In 1922, the club debuted in Primera División when joining dissident body "Asociación Amateurs de Football" (AAm) that had been created in 1919 to organise its own championships. Alvear played in Primera División until 1926, when dissident AAm and Argentine Football Association merged.

Alvear finished 7th. over 17 teams in the year of its debut, with an outstanding victory over Boca Juniors by 3–1 in Saavedra. The following seasons would not be good for the club, making poor campaigns that placed Alvear in the last positions of the table, even finishing last in 1925.

When both associations merged in 1926, Alvear, along with Argentino de Banfield, Boca Alumni, Del Plata, General San Martín, Palermo, Progresista, Sportivo Balcarce, Sportivo Dock Sud, Sportsman and Universal were relegated to the second division.

In 1927 Alvear debuted at Primera B, where the team finished 14 of 18. In 1931 the club moved to Saavedra, where the institution merged with Club Atlético Unión de Caseros. One year later, this merge was dissolved. It is believed that Club Alvear disappeared soon after.

== Honours ==
=== National ===
- Copa Bullrich (1): 1920 (Note: The Copa Bullrich was an official football competition contested by clubs playing in the Second Division. The AFA has not included this competition into the list of national cups because only teams in Primera División participated in those competitions.)
