= Argentino de Banfield =

- Full name: Club Argentino de Banfield
- Founded: 1 November 1915
- Dissolved: 15 March 1932; 93 years ago (merged with Argentino de Temperley)
- Ground: Banfield, Buenos Aires, Argentina
- League: Primera División (AFA)
- 1931: 27°
Home colours

Argentino Football Club de Banfield mostly known as Argentino de Banfield was an Argentine football club from the Banfield district of Greater Buenos Aires. The team played in Primera División during the 1920s and 1930s before merging with Club Atlético Temperley.

== History ==
The club was founded on 1 November 1915 and established its headquarters in Banfield, Buenos Aires, while building its stadium in Lomas de Zamora.

The football team affiliated to Argentine Football Association and made its debut in Primera División in 1923. Argentino only remained 4 seasons in Primera, being relegated among other teams when both leagues, dissident Asociación Amateurs de Football and official Asociación Argentina de Football merged in 1926.

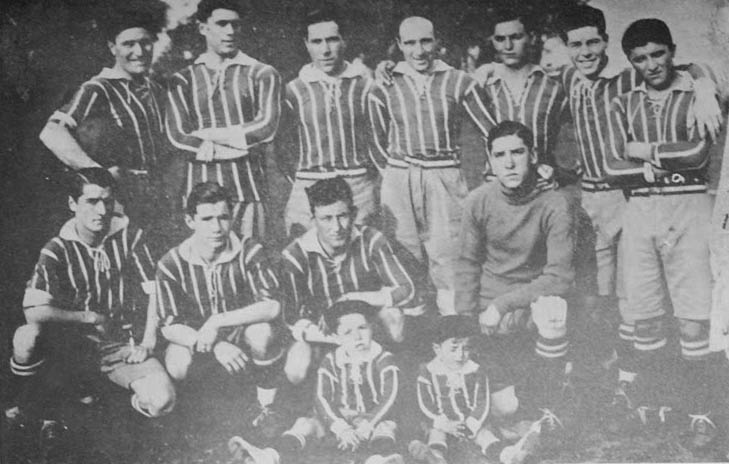
The squad in 1927.

Argentino only spent one season in the second division, returning to Primera at the end of 1927 season. The team finished 2nd after champion El Porvenir therefore both teams promoted to the highest division of Argentine football. Argentino played from 1928 to 1931 in the Asociación Amateurs (then merged with official AFA) with poor campaigns in those seasons.

With the creation of the first professional football league in Argentina, dissident Liga Argentina de Football in 1931, Argentino de Banfield remained playing in the official AFA until 1931.

Nevertheless it did not last so long because on 15 March 1932, Club Argentino de Banfield merged with C.A. Temperley to form "Argentino de Temperley", although both clubs Argentino and Temperley continued their social and other sports activities separately. Under the new name, the football squad played the 1933 and 1934 championships in the official amateur league (AFA). When both associations, LAF and AFA merged at the end of the season, all its teams (including Argentino de Temperley) were relegated to the second division.

Finally on 12 July 1935 members of the club renamed it as "Club Atlético Temperley" again.
