= Club Atlético Liberal Argentino =

Liberal Argentino
- Full name: Club Atlético Liberal Argentino
- Founded: 15 September 1906
- Dissolved: c. 1935; 91 years ago
- Ground: Warnes 181, Villa Crespo
- Chairman: Miguel Ortiz de Zárate
- League: Primera División
- 1934: 20th.
Home colours

Club Atlético Liberal Argentino, or simply Liberal Argentino, was an Argentine football club from Buenos Aires that played in Primera División in the 1920s and 1930s. After disaffiliating from the Argentine Association, the club was disestablished in the mid 1930s.

== History ==
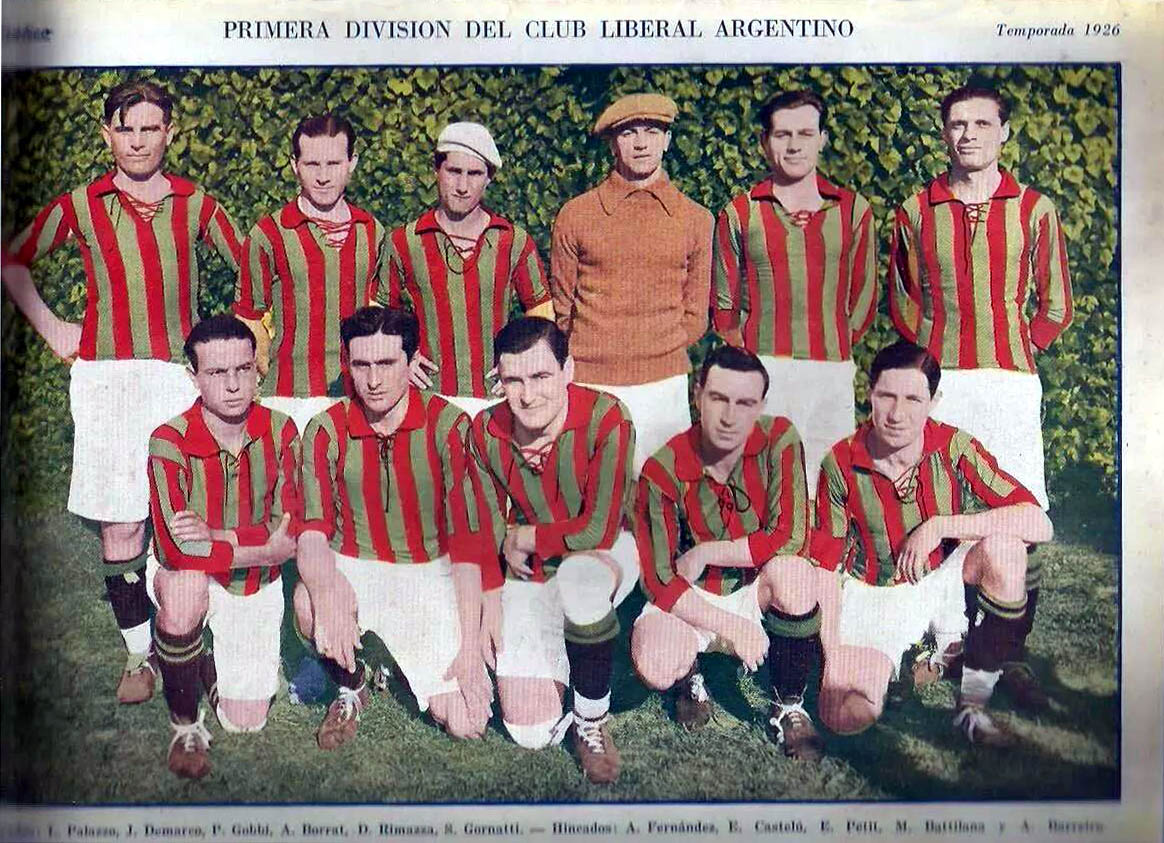
A Liberal Argentino team of 1926, on El Gráfico magazine

"Club Atlético Liberal Argentino" was established in Villa Crespo, Buenos Aires, in September 1906. During the 1910s Liberal Argentino was a bastion of the National Autonomist Party, a conservative political party during the 1874–1916 period with Julio Argentino Roca as its principal figure. By 1911 the club had gained a good reputation among the football enthusiast of its neighborhood of origin. Because of that, in 1912 Miguel Ortiz de Zárate, a political leader of Radical Civic Union (UCR) who had established Club Almagro one year before, got interested in the club, becoming president of the institution. Nevertheless, Ortiz de Zárate remained in the club for a short period of time, returning to Almagro in 1916.

After winning the second division championship in 1923 playing in dissident league Asociación Amateurs de Football, Liberal Argentino promoted to Primera División, the top division of Argentine football league system. The team debuted in the 1924 championship where it made a poor campaign finishing 20th of 24.

Liberal Argentino remained in Primera División until 1928 when it was relegated to the second division. Nevertheless, the club returned to the first division in 1933, playing in the official league (that had remained amateur unlike professional Liga Argentina de Football) although the team did not make a good performance. One year later, Liberal Argentino finished 8th.

Always playing at the AFA league, Liberal Argentino played its last tournament in 1934, where the team finished 20 of 23. It is believed that Liberal Argentino was dissolved soon after, probably in 1935.

== Honours ==
=== National ===
==== League ====
- Primera B (1): 1931
- División Intermedia (1): 1923 AAm

==== Other cups ====
- Copa Bullrich (1): 1916 (Note: The Copa Bullrich was an official football competition contested by clubs playing in the Second Division. The AFA has not included this competition into the list of national cups because only teams in Primera División participated in those competitions.)
