= Sportivo Dock Sud =

Dock Sud
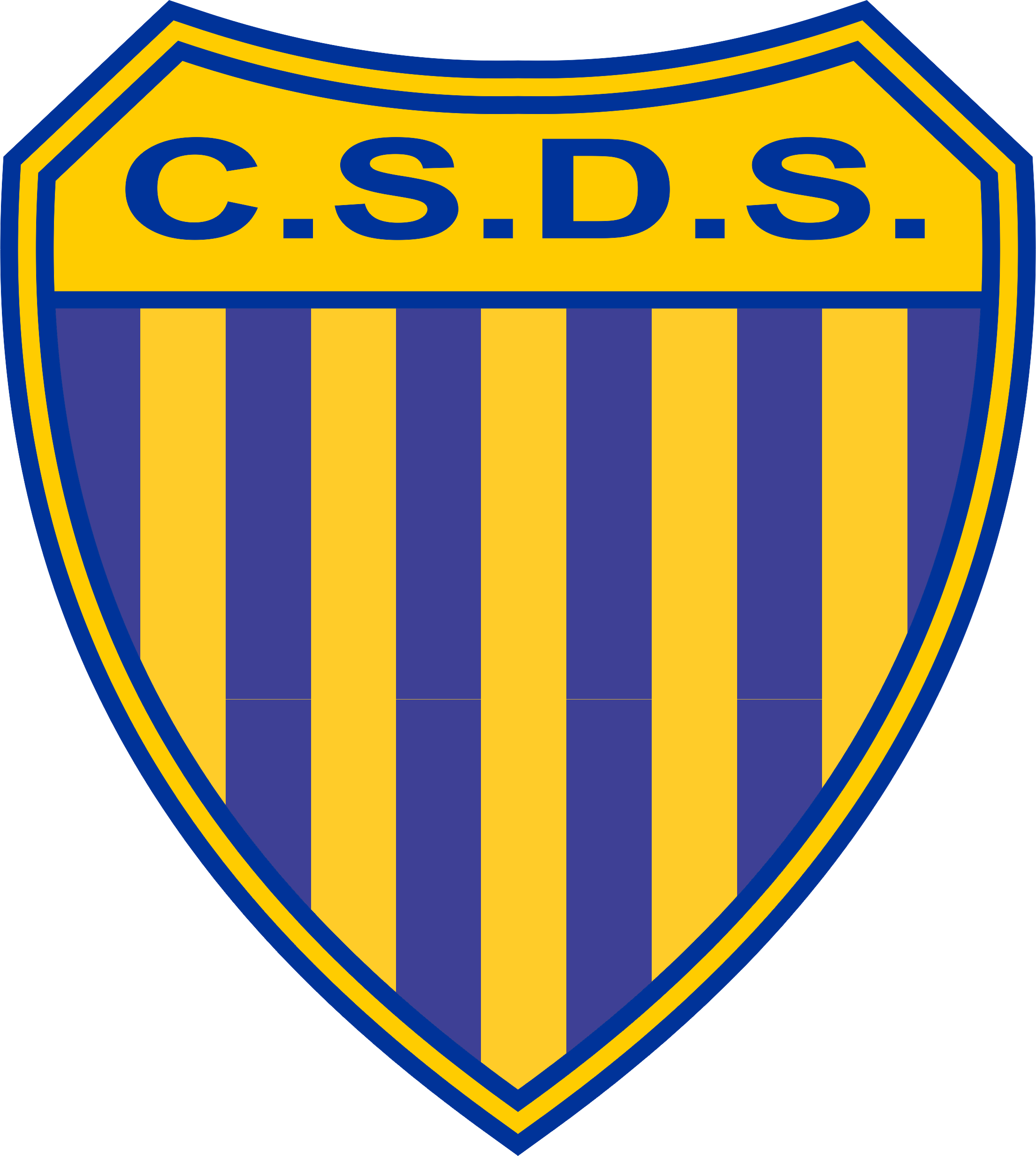
- Full name: Club Sportivo Dock Sud
- Nicknames: El Docke; Los Inundados; Darsenero
- Founded: 1 September 1916; 109 years ago
- Ground: Estadio de Los Inmigrantes, Dock Sud, Greater Buenos Aires
- Capacity: 5,000
- Chairman: Hernan Svizer
- Manager: Matias Cordoba
- League: Primera B Metropolitana
- 2016: 14°
- Website: clubsportivodocksud.com.ar
Home colours	Away colours	Third colours

Club Sportivo Dock Sud is an Argentine sports club based in the Dock Sud district of Avellaneda Partido, Greater Buenos Aires. The club is mostly known for its football team, which currently plays in Primera B Metropolitana, the third division of the Argentine football league system.

== History ==
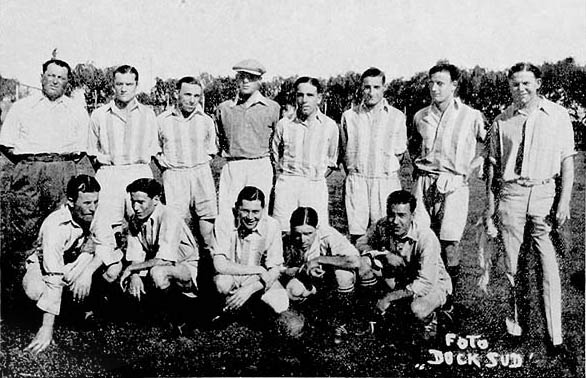
The team that won the Primera División title in 1933

A club called Club Atlético Dock Sud was founded in 1914, but it was soon dissolved. In 1916 the same individuals formed a new club named Sportivo Dock Sud, which has continued since then.

Dock Sud played at the top division of Argentine football, Primera División, from 1922 and 1926, being its best campaign in 1924 when the team finished 3rd. The squad returned to the first division in 1933 and 1934, when it participated in the AAF Amateur league.

Dock Sud's finest achievement to date was winning the 1933 amateur AAF league title. The team has had little success since turning professional other than a few lower league titles. In May, 2011, Dock Sud obtained a new title, promoting to Primera C after winning the 2010-11 championship.

== Titles ==
- Primera División (1): 1933
- Segunda División (1): 1932
- División Intermedia (1): 1921
- Primera C (1): 2021
- Primera D (2): 1984, 2010–11
