= Club Atlético Del Plata =

Del Plata
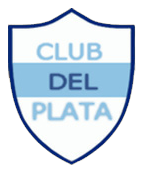
- Full name: Club Atlético Del Plata
- Founded: 20 September 1915
- Dissolved: 1990s
- Ground: Quilmes (last)
- League: Primera División
- 1926: 16th
Home colours

Club Atlético Del Plata (mostly known as Del Plata) was an Argentine football club that played in Primera División during the 1920s. The club would be later re-established but it finally disappeared in the 1990s.

== History ==
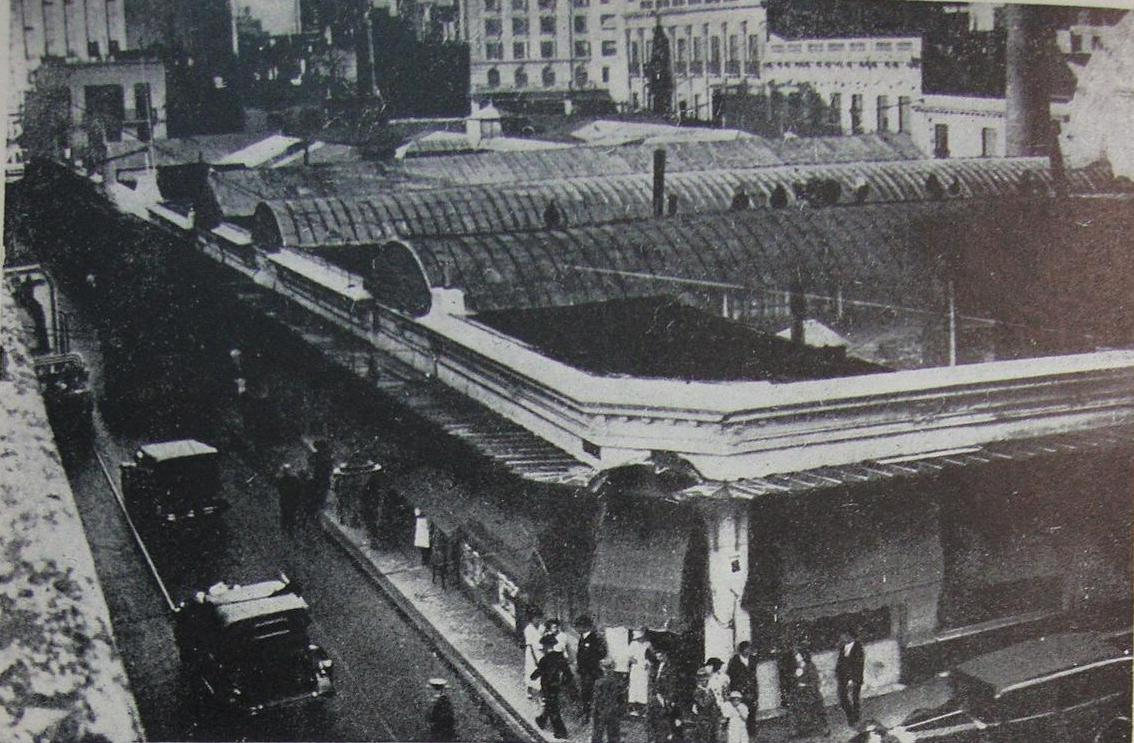
The Mercado del Plata inspired the name of the club

The club was founded by employees of former "Mercado del Plata", a popular market of Buenos Aires established in 1856 which sold and distributed fruits and vegetables, among other goods. The club was established on 20 September 1915 as Club Atlético Del Plata, taking the name from the market which its founders worked at.

The club affiliated to the Argentine Football Association and started to play at the third division (current Primera C) in 1915 staying there until 1918, it then promoted to second division (then called "División Intermedia") finally reaching the Primera División in 1920. The team finished 5th of 20 in its first season at the top division. One year later Del Plata made its best campaign in Primera, finishing 2nd after champion Huracán with 12 wins and only 2 losses within 18 games played.

Since 1927, the club played in the second division until it was disaffiliated by the Football Association in 1932.

Del Plata was dissolved in 1947, although the institution would be re-established in the 1960s, remaining active until the decade of the 1990s when it was definitely closed.

=== Team colors ===
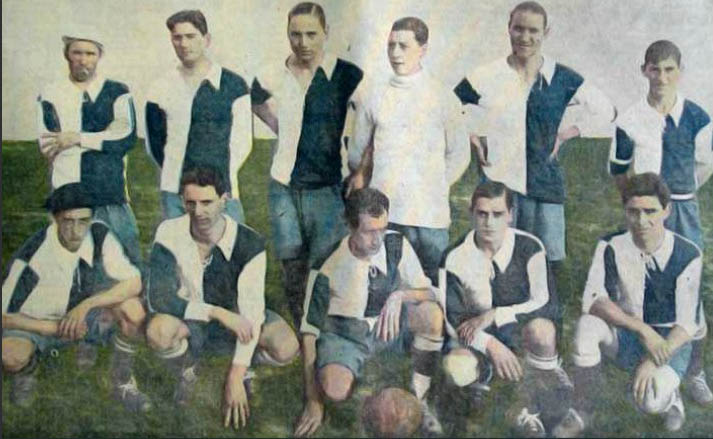
A Del Plata line-up of 1920

Del Plata's first jersey was a white and light blue vertical stripes (similar to Racing Club de Avellaneda) which was worn until 1922 then the club adopted the half blue and white that would be its distinctive colors until its dissolution during the 1990s.

1915–22	1922-end
