= Club Sportivo Buenos Aires =

Sportivo Buenos Aires
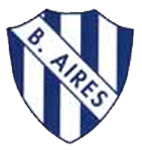
- Full name: Club Social y Sportivo Buenos Aires
- Founded: 1 February 1918
- Dissolved: 1960s
- Ground: Floresta, Buenos Aires
- League: Primera División (AAF)
- 1934: 22nd
Home colours

Club Sportivo Buenos Aires is a defunct Argentine football club from the city of Buenos Aires that played in Primera División during the 1920s.

== History ==
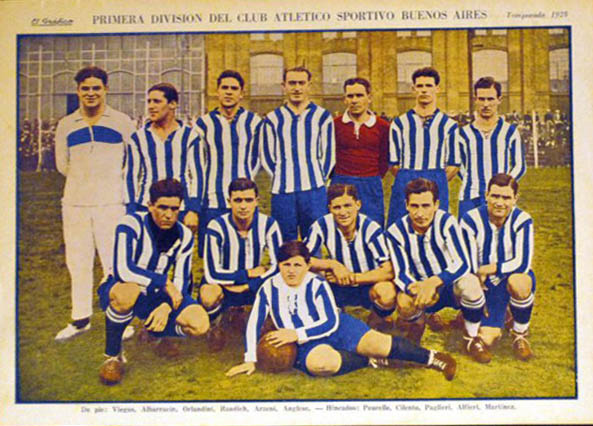
Team of Sportivo Buenos Aires of 1928

The club was founded on 1 February 1918, when clubs Buenos Aires Isla Maciel and Sportivo Argentino merged. The Sportivo Argentino had been founded in 1915 by former players of Boca Juniors' youth and senior players separated from the club due to problems with its managers. The first name chosen for the club was "Petrolero" ("Oiler" in Spanish) but it was rejected by the Argentine Football Association so they changed to "Sportivo Argentino".

Sportivo Buenos Aires affiliated to the Association in 1918 playing at the second division (then named "División Intermedia") until 1920 when the team promoted to Primera División to play at the "Asociación Amateur de Football" (AAF), the amateur league. When football became professional in Argentina, Buenos Aires continued its tenure on the amateur league which lasted until 1934, when the AAF merged with the professional league. Sportivo Buenos Aires was relegated to the second division as well as all teams that took part in the AAF.

The team continued to play in the second division until 1939 when it was relegated to the third division. Buenos Aires remained there until 1941 when the club disaffiliated from the Association. It is believed that the club was dissolved in the 1960s.

== Venues ==
The first stadium was located in the Isla Maciel of Dock Sud district in Avellaneda Partido. In 1923 the club moved to La Boca neighborhood of Buenos Aires, in the same place where the River Plate stadium had been erected before moving to Núñez.

The club's last location was on the corner of Alvarez Jonte and Sanabria streets in Floresta neighborhood, also in Buenos Aires.

== Notable players ==
Most notable player for the club was striker Carlos Peucelle who played there from 1927 and 1930. He was acquired by River Plate in 1930 for 10,000 Argentine pesos, which was a huge amount of money by then. Due to this transaction River Plate was nicknamed The Millionaires, which has remained as the most distinctive nickname for both the club and its supporters.

During his run on River Plate Peucelle played 307 matches scoring 113 goals. He also disputed with Argentina national team the 1930 World Cup held in Uruguay.
