= Club Atlético Palermo =

Palermo
- Full name: Club Atlético Palermo
- Founded: 21 July 1914; 112 years ago
- Ground: Palermo, Buenos Aires
- League: Primera División (AFA) (Note: The official association (AFA) remained amateur after the big five and other clubs formed a professional dissident league, Liga Argentina de Football. In 1934 both associations merged, and amateur teams were relegated to Segunda División.)
- 1934: 23rd
- Website: clubpalermo.org
Home colours

Club Atlético Palermo is a sports club from the Palermo neighborhood of Buenos Aires, Argentina. The club has British roots, so the first clubs in London had been founded as social institutions so therefore they were usually the place where gentlemen of the high classes met.

Palermo played in Primera División, the first division of Argentina, during the 1920s, and then disaffiliated when football became professional in the country. Some relevant players from the institution are brothers Federico and Gonzalo Higuaín, as well as Leandro Gracián, who all played for Palermo in children divisions. Other sports practised at the club are volleyball, archery, roller skate and martial arts.

== History ==
=== Social context ===
At the beginning of the 20th century there was a big British community in Argentina, much of them with commercial interests in the area such as railway lines. The Welsh community mostly established in the city of Rawson, Chubut, at the South of Argentine. The name of that city pays tribute to Guillermo Rawson, the Governor who encouraged Welsh people to establish there. The Irish settled in Exaltación de la Cruz Partido, in the north of Buenos Aires Province, between 1830 and 1840. The main activity of the Irish Immigrants was the agriculture (that is still a huge rural zone) and its legacy persist in cities such as Gaynor or Dugan, named honoring some relevant Irish citizens. By 1838, the Scottish community in Buenos Aires was an important part of the population, so they decided to create the St. Andrew's Scots School to educate their children in their language.

British people started to found their own social institutions, which did not allow non-British members at the beginning of their existence. Some of the clubs with this rule were Buenos Aires Cricket & Rugby Club and Quilmes Athletic Club, although those institutions would finally accept Argentine people as its members as years went by.

During the Industrial Revolution England found numerous commercial opportunities in Argentina, where the British-owned companies built most of the railway lines and stations, operating them until their nationalization in 1940 when Juan Perón was president. Therefore, a big group of British engineers and managers moved to Argentina during the construction of those railway lines. It is presumed that those railway workers brought football to Argentina.

=== Foundation and competition ===
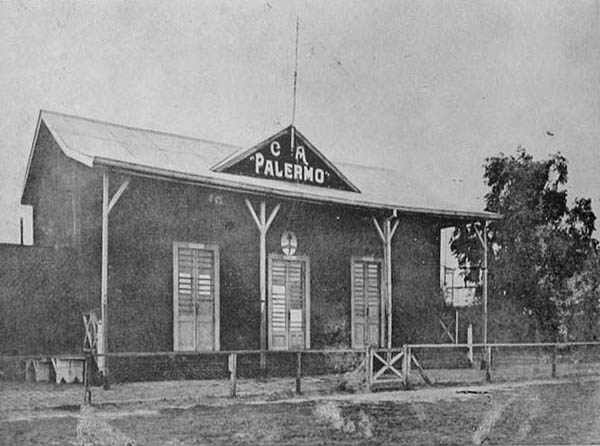
Clubhouse as seen in 1922

The club was founded as "Club Atlético Palermo" on 21 July 1914, as a result of a merge with Club General Soler, from which Palermo adopted its colors (red with blue borders) for the first jersey uniform. Arturo Sosa, the chemist of the neighborhood, was elected as president of the club. Palermo established its headquarters in Paraguay street, although it later moved to Juan B. Justo avenue until 1927, when the club returned to its original location.

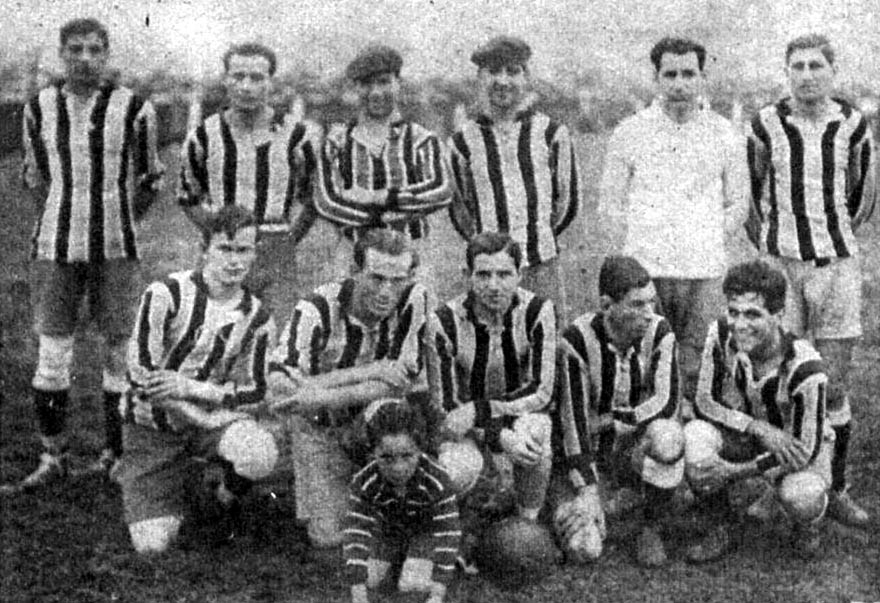
Team of Palermo in 1925

In 1914 Palermo affiliated to the Argentine Football Association playing at División Intermedia, the second level by then. Its first field was on the corner of Soler and Humboldt streets of Buenos Aires, then moving to Mendoza and Freire in Belgrano neighborhood. The club has also another field in Villa Lynch, Tres de Febrero Partido of Greater Buenos Aires.

In 1919 Palermo was near to promote to Primera División although the team was defeated by Banfield 1–0. Nevertheless, the club took part in the 1920 tournament although Palermo did not play all the games, being disaffiliated that same season along with Lanús and Sportivo Almagro.

Palermo returned to Primera in 1923 but playing at the rival league, Asociación Amateurs de Football (AAm). The team soon switched to the official league (AFA) again where lasted from 1924 to 1926, until the squad was relegated to the second division after both associations merged at the end of the season.

=== Final years in official tournaments ===
In 1933 Club Atlético Palermo merged with Sportivo Palermo and the new club played the 1933 and 1934 AAF championships as "Atlético y Sportivo Palermo". After the 1934 season the AAF and the Liga Argentina de Football (the professional league) merged to form the "Asociación del Football Argentino" remaining the professional mode to date. Sportivo Palermo and CA Palermo separated, never playing an official tournament again although football has continued as sport at the club, but only for children.

== Honours ==
- División Intermedia (1): 1921 AAm (Note: The Asociación Amateurs de Football (AAm) was a dissident amateur league which organized its own championships from 1919 to 1926.)

== Other sports ==
=== Basketball ===
By 1945 football had lost its predominance within the club, being basketball its most representative sport. Palermo disputed many matches against its classic rival Club Parque in the 1940s. Palermo's most prominent player was Ricardo Primitivo González, who took part of the Argentina national basketball team that won the 1950 FIBA World Championship.

== Literature ==
Argentine writer Adolfo Bioy Casares was probably the most famous Palermo's fan. He played at the club's youth divisions as striker and he usually talked about his fondness for the club.
