= Sportivo Palermo =

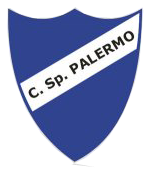
- Full name: Club Sportivo Palermo
- Founded: 18 May 1908
- Dissolved: 1984; 41 years ago
- League: Primera D
- 1983: 12.^{o}
Home colours

Club Sportivo Palermo was an Argentine football club that played in the Primera División during the 1920s. After being relegated in the 1930s and having played at lower divisions, the club was finally disbanded in the 1980s.

== History ==
On May 18, 1908, Club Sportivo Palermo was established, adopting blue as its jersey color. The great number of clubs that were founded during the beginning of the 20th century in Argentina resulted in the creation of many leagues and associations, which run in line with Asociación Argentina de Football. One of those leagues was the "Federación Argentina de Football", which run until 1914 when it merged with AFA.

Sportivo Palermo wanted to affiliate to the new association, so the team merged with Club Atlas, an institution from La Paternal, Buenos Aires, in 1915. The name "Sportivo Palermo" prevailed over Atlas for the new club. Its home field was placed in Caseros, Buenos Aires, moving to Palermo neighborhood in 1922. In 1917 the club won the Segunda División championship, and three years later Sportivo Palermo took over Asociación Atlética Eureka, another football club which had been promoted to Categoría de Honor division. Palermo's first participation in Primera División was in 1920, playing consecutively in the top division of Argentine football until 1932, when the club was relegated to second division.

At the beginning of 1922 the club managers got a field that was property of then British-owned company Ferrocarril Central Argentino. That land was located in the crossing of Canning Avenue and the railway tracks, near the Rio de la Plata. Sportivo Palermo started to build a stadium there, finishing the works in 1924.

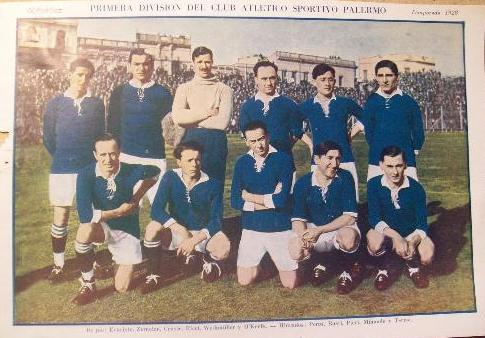
Sportivo Palermo squad in 1927

Sportivo's best campaign in Primera was in 1922 when finishing in second place after champion Huracán. The squad won 11 matches with only 2 losses, also achieving a great 3–2 victory over Boca Juniors.

in 1928, Argentina national football team won the silver medal at the Olympic Games, after losing the final at the hands of Uruguay. That squad had six players of Sportivo Palermo in its roster: Paternóster, Weismuller, Zumelzú, Bidoglio, Herman, and Juan Evaristo.

In 1931 football became professional in Argentina, with a new league established, Liga Argentina de Football. That body and official "Asociación Argentina de Football" organised their championships simultaneously. Sportivo Palermo remained competing in the official body. The team played the 1931 and 1932 tournaments, finishing in the last position in 1932 and disaffiliating once the championship was finished.

In 1933 Sportivo Palermo merged with Club Atlético Palermo and the recently formed team played the 1933 and 1934 AAF championships as "Atlético y Sportivo Palermo". After the 1934 season the AAF and the Liga Argentina de Football (the professional league) merged to form the "Asociación del Football Argentino" which has remained professional to date. At the end of that season, Sportivo Palermo and Club Atlético Palermo separated. Sportivo kept out of the official tournaments until 1956, when the club was re-affiliated to Association to play the Primera D championship (then named "Tercera División"). That was a successful year for the club so Sportivo Palermo promoted to Primera C along with champion Almirante Brown.

Sportivo Palermo would be relegated to the last division in 1959 and 1970, where they played until 1984, when the club disaffiliated from the Argentine Association definitely and soon after it was dissolved.

== Titles ==
- Segunda División (1): 1917
