= Estudiantil Porteño =

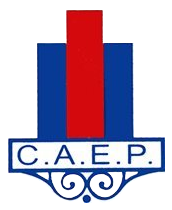
- Full name: Club Atlético Estudiantil Porteño
- Founded: 6 September 1902; 122 years ago
- Chairman: Carlos Garbessi
- League: Segunda División
- 1938: 10°
- Website: caep.org.ar
Home colours

Club Atlético Estudiantil Porteño, mostly known as Estudiantil Porteño is an Argentine sports club, located in the Ramos Mejía district of Greater Buenos Aires.

The institution hosts many activities such as artistic roller skating, basketball, football, futsal, gymnastics, handball, karate roller hockey, swimming, tennis and volleyball.

== History ==
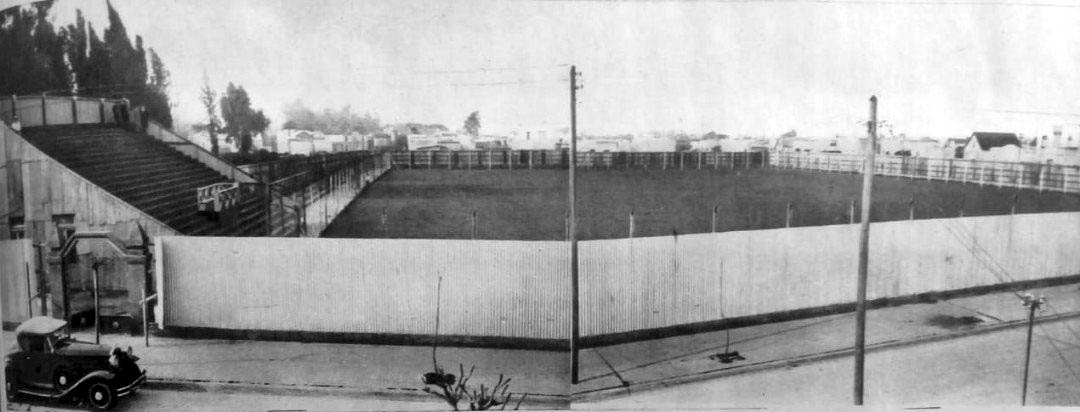
The Estudiantil Porteño stadium in 1936

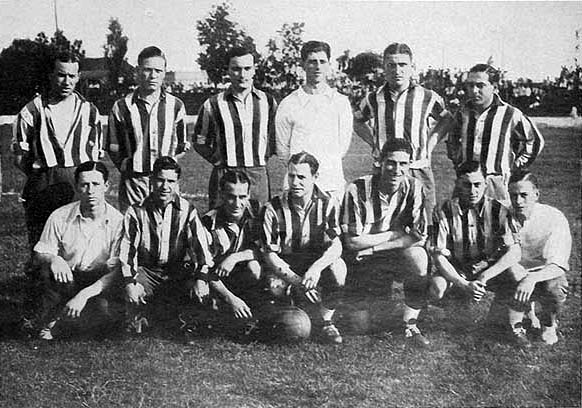
The 1931 team, champion of Primera División

The football team gained relevance during the years it played in the top division of Argentine football, the Primera División, having made its debut in the 1913 season.

When in 1931 football became professional in Argentina with the creation of dissident Liga Argentina de Football, Estudiantil Porteño stayed in the official league that had remained amateur. The club won the 1931 (defeating Almagro 3–1 at the final) and 1934 (played in a round-robin format) titles, just before both leagues merged and all the amateur league teams were relegated to the Second Division because of the merging.

Estudiantil Porteño played at the second division only 4 seasons, disaffiliating from the Association at the end of the 1938 tournament. Since then, the club has not played any football championship organised by the Argentine Association.

== Honours ==
=== National ===
- Primera División (2): 1931, 1934
