= Sportivo Barracas =

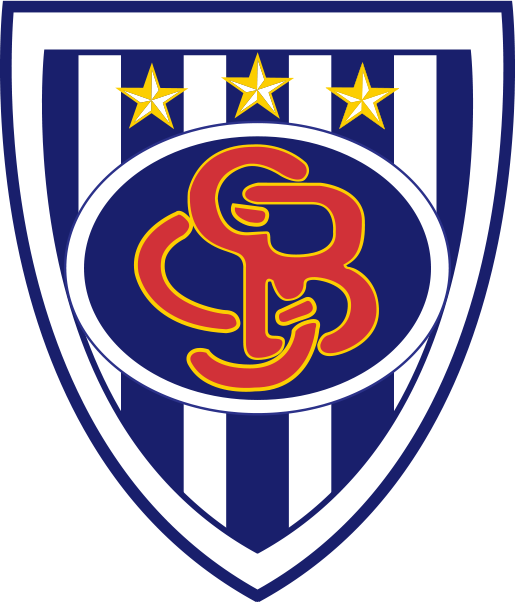
- Full name: Club Sportivo Barracas
- Nicknames: Arrabalero; Sportivo
- Founded: 30 October 1913; 112 years ago
- Ground: (None)
- Capacity: 6,500
- Chairman: Víctor Santamaría
- Manager: Damián Infante
- League: Primera C
- 2025: 5th of Zona B
| Home colours | Away colours |

Club Sportivo Barracas is an Argentine sports club from Buenos Aires. The institution was born as a rowing club, nevertheless it is mostly known for its football activities nowadays. The team currently plays in Primera C Metropolitana, the fourth division of the Argentine football league system. The club has also a women's football section.

Apart from football, Sportivo Barracas also hosts the practice of futsal, artistic roller skating, and other disciplines.

== History ==
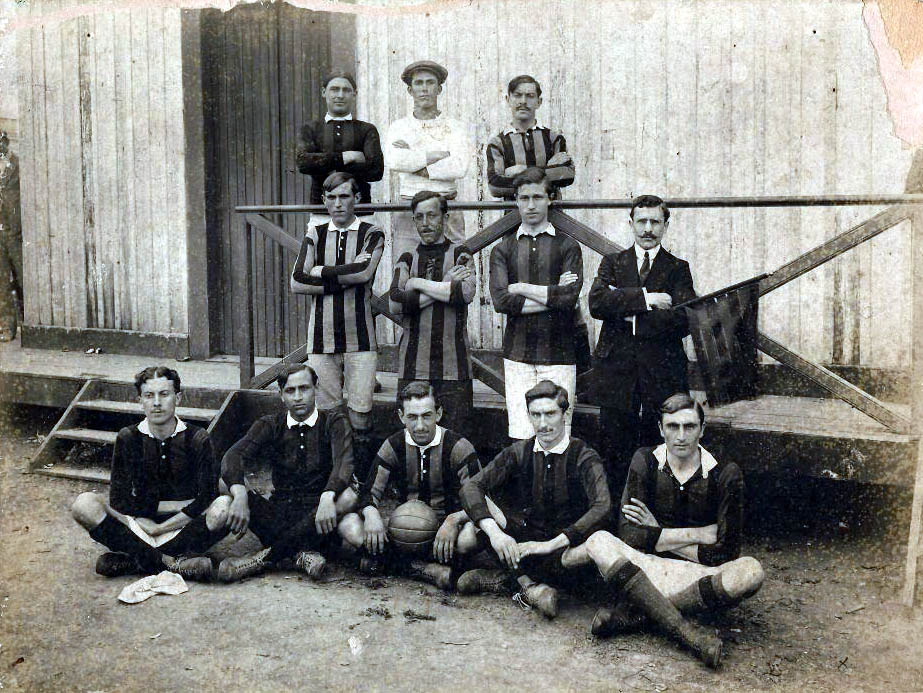
Riachuelo F.C. (pictured in 1910), predecessor of Sportivo Barracas

The club was founded on October 30, 1913, in its headquarters still located in the barrio of Barracas in Buenos Aires, as "Club Sportivo Barracas", after Riachuelo F.C. merged to it. The club bought the Riachuelo F.C. facilities on Iriarte and Santa Elena streets to play football there. Riachuelo had played its only season in Primera División in 1913, being relegated to División Intermedia after finishing last. Sportivo Barracas took its place in the division.

As Sportivo Barracas won the Intermedia championship in 1916, it promoted to Primera División. The team made its debut in the Argentine Primera División in 1917, finishing 5th. The team played in Primera until the league became professional in 1931.

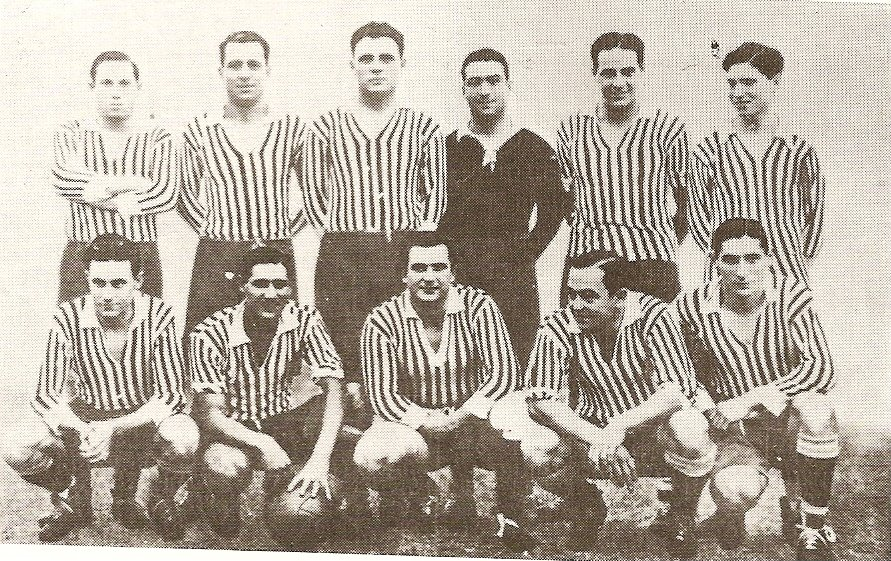
The team that won the Primera División championship in 1932

Sportivo became one of the clubs to make the decision of staying amateur so it remained at the official body, Argentine Association. This decision paid dividends because the following year Sportivo Barracas won the 1932 championship. It remained unaffiliated to Argentine Football Association from 1936 to 1967, never regaining its amateur notability since its return.

Following an influx of external financial support, the club moved to play its football matches to Bolivar, Buenos Aires Province, in 2003, changing its name to "Club Sportivo Barracas Bolívar", as well as the shirt colors and crest. However, all other activities of the club remained in Buenos Aires.

In 2010, the club left the city of Bolívar, playing its home games at Acassuso stadium of San Isidro, Buenos Aires. Sportivo Barracas has a major rivalry with Barracas Central, the other team in the Barracas neighbourhood.

In March 2011, the club put the image of former President of Argentina Néstor Kirchner on the jersey as a tribute to him. In May 2012, Sportivo Barracas was disaffiliated for one season after finishing last in the Primera D championship. The vacant place was filled by Puerto Nuevo which returned to the division.

In 2015, Sportivo Barracas won the Primera D championship, promoting to the upper level.

== Stadium ==
In 1919 the club began works to build its own stadium, Estadio Sportivo Barracas on the land next to former Riachuelo F.C. The first official match played at Sportivo Barracas was the 1919 Tie Cup Final, when Boca Juniors beat Uruguayan team Nacional 2–0. Nevertheless, the stadium was officially inaugurated on July 14, 1920, a friendly game between Rosarian teams Newell's Old Boys and Tiro Federal, won by Newell's 1–0. The Argentina national team played its first game there on July 25, 1920, a Copa Newton match v Uruguay attended by 18,000 people.

In the 1920s and 1930s the Sportivo Barracas stadium was one of the most important stadiums in Argentina. It held 30,000 spectators and was used as a venue for the South American Championship 1921 and South American Championship 1925.

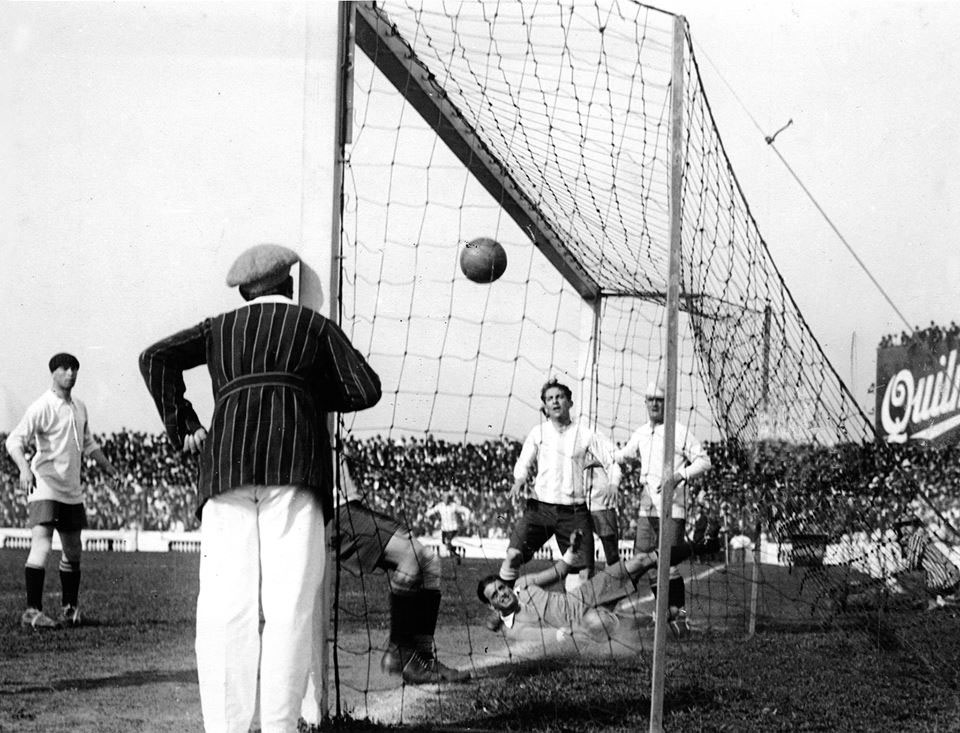
The historic "Olympic goal" by Cesáreo Onzari scored at Sportivo Barracas stadium in 1924

An important anecdotic fact related to the stadium took place on the match between Argentina and Uruguay, on October 2, 1924. In June of that year, Uruguay had attained the Olympic football crown at Paris, which at that moment was a kind of unofficial world title, since the World Cup was not played until 1930. The rivalry between Argentina and Uruguay was already an important one, so the match generated much expectancy. After the Uruguayan title, two matches were to be played between Uruguay and Argentina. The first one was in Montevideo and finished 1–1. The second one in Buenos Aires was to be played on September 28, but there were so many people at the stadium that day that the field itself was occupied by supporters. The Uruguayans asked for the suspension of the match and a perimeter to separate people from players on the next encounter, which was finally played on October 2, 1924.

That day, before playing the match, the Uruguayans celebrated their Olympic title by circumvallating the field, something described then as la vuelta de los olímpicos (the round of the Olympic ones), lately just vuelta olímpica (Olympic round). Argentina won that match 2–1 (Onzari 1–0 at 15’, Cea 1–1 at 29’, and Tarasconi 2–1 at 53’), but it was Onzari's goal which was to be remembered, because it was converted directly from a corner kick. The International Board had specifically modified the football rules on this point on June 14, 1924, allowing goals to be scored like that. Since then, a goal like Onzari's is referred as a Gol olímpico or Olympic goal in almost all Latin America, and even some parts of Europe. It is the first time that an Olympic goal is called that way, as well as its the debut of the expression vuelta olímpica in Latin America. Onzari was at that moment playing for Huracán.

The field was also used in 1925 for the first boxing fight in open space of Luis Ángel Firpo. From 2003 to 2010 the club played its home games at the Estadio Municipal de Bolívar.

== Honours ==
=== National ===
==== League ====
- Primera División (1): 1932
- División Intermedia (1): 1916
- Primera D (2): 2003–04, 2015

==== National cups ====
- Copa de Competencia Jockey Club (1): 1921

==== Other cups ====
- Copa de Competencia de Segunda División (1): 1916
