= 1932 Argentine Primera División =

41st season of top-tier football league in Argentina

Primera División
- Season: 1932
- Dates: 13 March 1932 – 28 January 1933
- Champions: Sportivo Barracas (AFA); River Plate (LAF)

The 1932 Primera División was the 41st season of top-flight football in Argentina. It continued with both associations organising tournaments: the official AFA season, contested between March 13 and November 13, used the same format as the previous season: a double round-robin format with no relegation at the end of the tournament. The dissident Liga Argentina de Football (LAF, the professional one) started on March 20, with two relegations programmed although a change of rules determined that only Sportivo Palermo was relegated to the second division.

Sportivo Barracas won the amateur Asociación Argentina de Football (AFA) title while River Plate won its second Primera División title after a decisive playoff against Independiente. Víctor Caamaño was the coach of the champion. The topscorer of the LAF was Bernabé Ferreyra of River Plate, who scored 43 goals.

== Final tables ==
=== Asociación Argentina de Football (AFA) ===
Primera División (AFA)
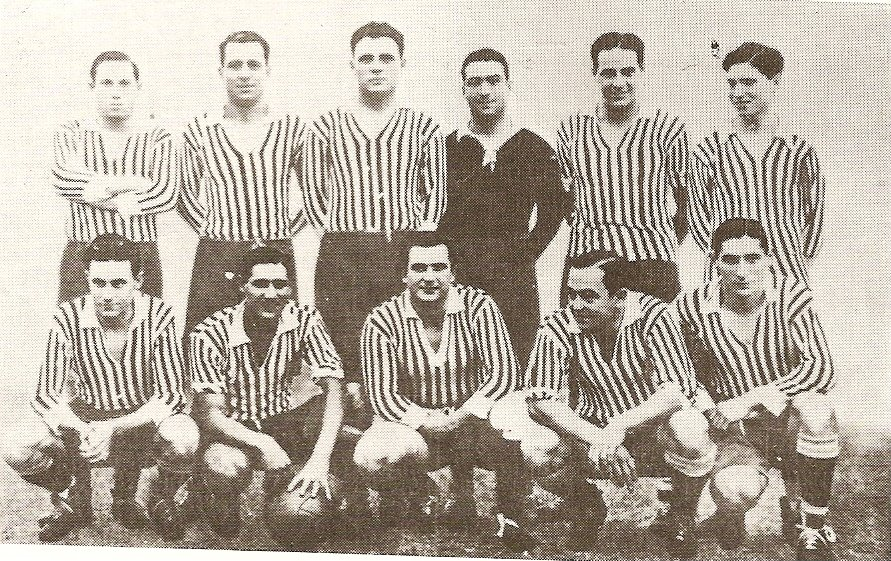
- Sportivo Barracas, AFA champions
- Season: 1932
- Dates: 20 March 1932 – 28 January 1933
- Champions: Sportivo Barracas (1st title)
- Promoted: Liberal Argentino; All Boys
- Relegated: Sportivo Palermo
- Top goalscorer: (Argentina) Juan Carlos Irurieta (All Boys) (23 goals)
- Biggest home win: Def. Belgrano 5–0 N. Chicago (24 Apr)
- Biggest away win: Almagro 0–5 Sp. Barracas (19 Nov)
- Highest scoring: Def. Belgrano 3–5 El Porvenir (2 Oct); Sp. B. Aires 3–5 Colegiales (26 Nov)

Pos	Team	Pld	W	D	L	GF	GA	GD	Pts
1	Sportivo Barracas	32	21	5	6	74	35	+39	47
2	Barracas Central	32	18	6	8	46	33	+13	42
3	Colegiales	32	17	8	7	55	43	+12	42
4	Defensores de Belgrano	32	16	6	10	56	46	+10	38
5	All Boys	32	16	5	11	70	55	+15	37
6	Almagro	32	14	7	11	48	50	−2	35
7	El Porvenir	32	13	6	13	54	45	+9	32
8	Estudiantes (BA)	32	9	12	11	53	54	−1	30
9	Banfield	32	12	6	14	44	49	−5	30
10	Excursionistas	32	11	8	13	54	66	−12	30
11	Liberal Argentino	32	10	8	14	34	41	−7	28
12	Estudiantil Porteño	32	10	7	15	45	71	−26	27
13	Argentino (Q)	32	11	4	17	51	57	−6	26
14	Argentino (T)	32	9	8	15	35	57	−22	26
15	Nueva Chicago	32	10	5	17	50	62	−12	25 (Note: Relegation playoff. After three matches drew, the fourth game was never played and both teams remained in Primera.)
16	Sportivo Buenos Aires	32	8	9	15	45	63	−18	25
17	Sportivo Palermo	32	10	4	18	39	36	+3	24

=== Liga Argentina de Football ===
Primera División (LAF)
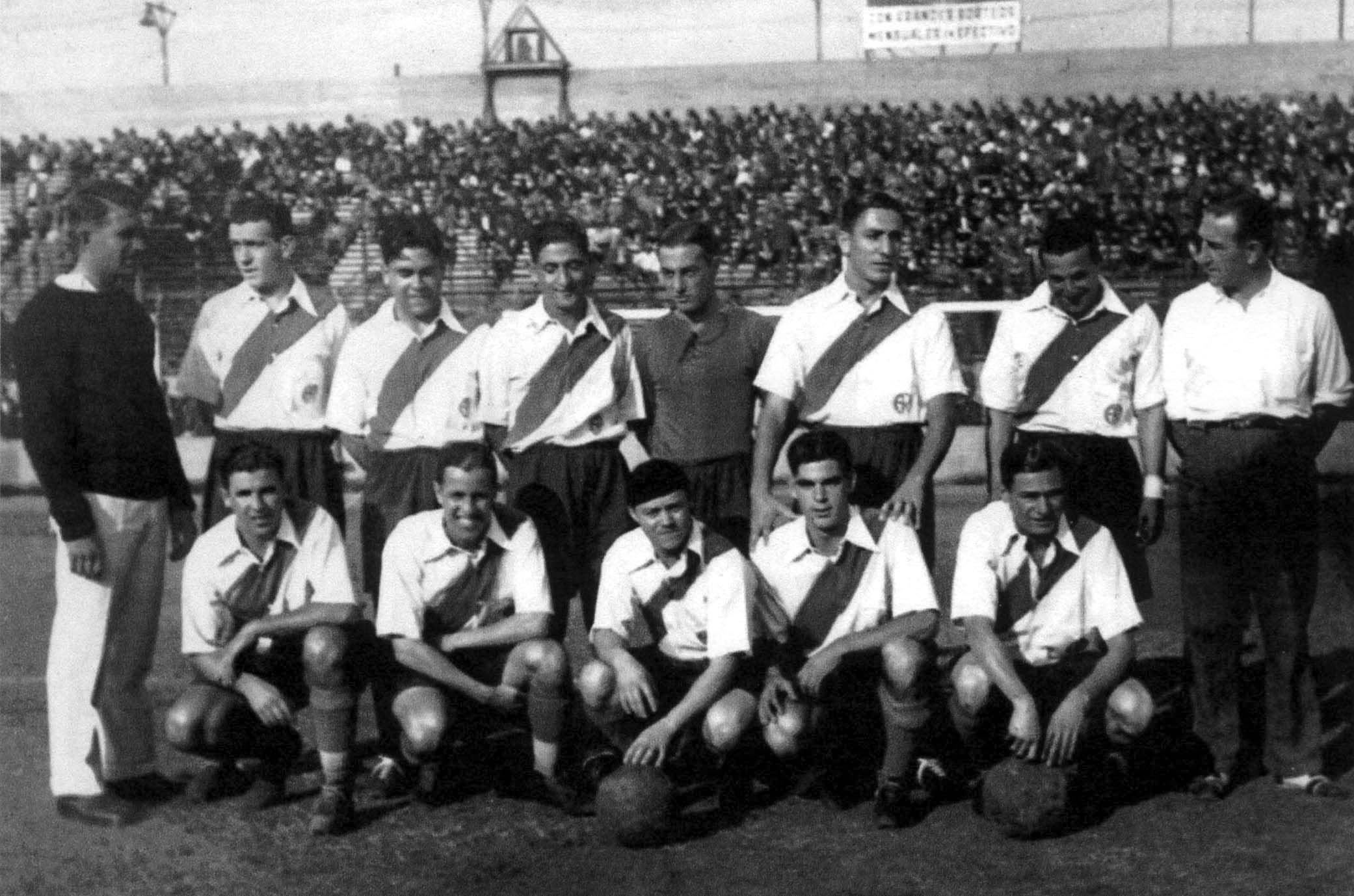
- River Plate, LAF champions
- Season: 1932
- Dates: 13 March – 20 November
- Champions: River Plate (2nd title)
- Relegated: (none)
- Matches: 306
- Goals: 1,075 (3.51 per match)
- Top goalscorer: (Argentina) Bernabé Ferreyra (43 goals)
- Biggest home win: Boca 7–0 Quilmes (25 Sep)
- Biggest away win: Atlanta 1–6 GELP (2 Oct)
- Highest scoring: San Lorenzo 8–2 Tigre (11 Sep)

Pos	Team	Pld	W	D	L	GF	GA	GD	Pts
1	River Plate	34	22	6	6	81	43	+38	50 (Note: Played a championship playoff after both teams finished first with 50 points each.)
2	Independiente	34	22	6	6	70	40	+30	50
3	Racing	34	20	9	5	59	26	+33	49
4	Boca Juniors	34	20	6	8	82	45	+37	46
5	San Lorenzo	34	17	11	6	83	44	+39	45
6	Estudiantes (LP)	34	16	8	10	80	62	+18	40
7	Gimnasia y Esgrima (LP)	34	15	7	12	78	61	+17	37
8	Vélez Sarsfield	34	15	7	12	48	52	−4	37
9	Huracán	34	14	7	13	58	62	−4	35
10	Platense	34	13	9	12	57	63	−6	35
11	Ferro Carril Oeste	34	13	7	14	64	59	+5	33
12	Quilmes	34	13	6	15	50	67	−17	32
13	Chacarita Juniors	34	12	7	15	74	73	+1	31
14	Argentinos Juniors	34	6	11	17	40	65	−25	23
15	Lanús	34	6	6	22	37	74	−37	18
16	Talleres (RE)	34	5	7	22	44	74	−30	17
17	Tigre	34	5	7	22	49	94	−45	17
18	Atlanta	34	6	5	23	32	82	−50	17

==== Championship playoff ====
After River Plate and Independiente finished tied on points, a match was held to define a champion.

Series	Team 1	Res.	Team 2	Venue	City
Final	River Plate	3–0	Independiente	San Lorenzo Stadium	Buenos Aires

==== Match details ====
1932 Primera División (LAF) Final
November 20, 1932
Final

River Plate	3–0	Independiente
Ferreyra 11'; Peucelle 22'; Zatelli 38'	Report

San Lorenzo Stadium, Buenos Aires
Referee: Eduardo Forte

River Plate
Independiente

GK	(Argentina) Sebastián Sirni
DF	(Argentina) Roberto Basílico
DF	(Argentina) Alberto Cuello
MF	(Argentina) Carlos Santamaría
MF	(Argentina) Manuel Dañil
MF	(Argentina) Esteban Malazzo
FW	(Argentina) Ricardo Zatelli
FW	(Uruguay) Pedro Lago
FW	(Argentina) Bernabé Ferreyra
FW	(Argentina) Carlos Peucelle
FW	(Argentina) Nazareno Luna
Manager:
(Argentina) Víctor Caamaño

GK	(Argentina) Atilio Maccarone
DF	(Argentina) Luis María Fazio
DF	(Spain) Fermín Lecea
MF	(Argentina) Juan Ferrou
MF	(Uruguay) Juan C. Corazzo
MF	(Uruguay) Emilio Almiñana
FW	(Uruguay) Roberto Porta
FW	(Argentina) Antonio Sastre
FW	(Argentina) Manuel Seoane
FW	(Argentina) Manuel Ramos
FW	(Argentina) Juan Betinotti
Manager:
(Uruguay) Zoilo Canavery
