= Manuel Ramos (footballer) =

Argentine footballer

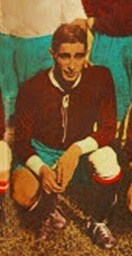

Personal information
- Date of birth: c.1910
- Place of birth: Buenos Aires, Argentina
- Date of death: ?
- Position: Forward

Senior career*
Years	Team	Apps	(Gls)
- Club Atlético Independiente
- * Club domestic league appearances and goals

Manuel Ramos was an Argentine footballer, who played as forward in Club Atlético Independiente. He played the first final of professionalism against River Plate.

In 1932, he was incorporated into the Independiente team together with Atilio Maccarone, Emilio Almiñana and Fermín Lecea. This team had consecrated figures as Antonio Sastre and Manuel Seoane.
