= Estadio Sportivo Barracas =

Football stadium in Argentina, 1920–1937

Sportivo Barracas
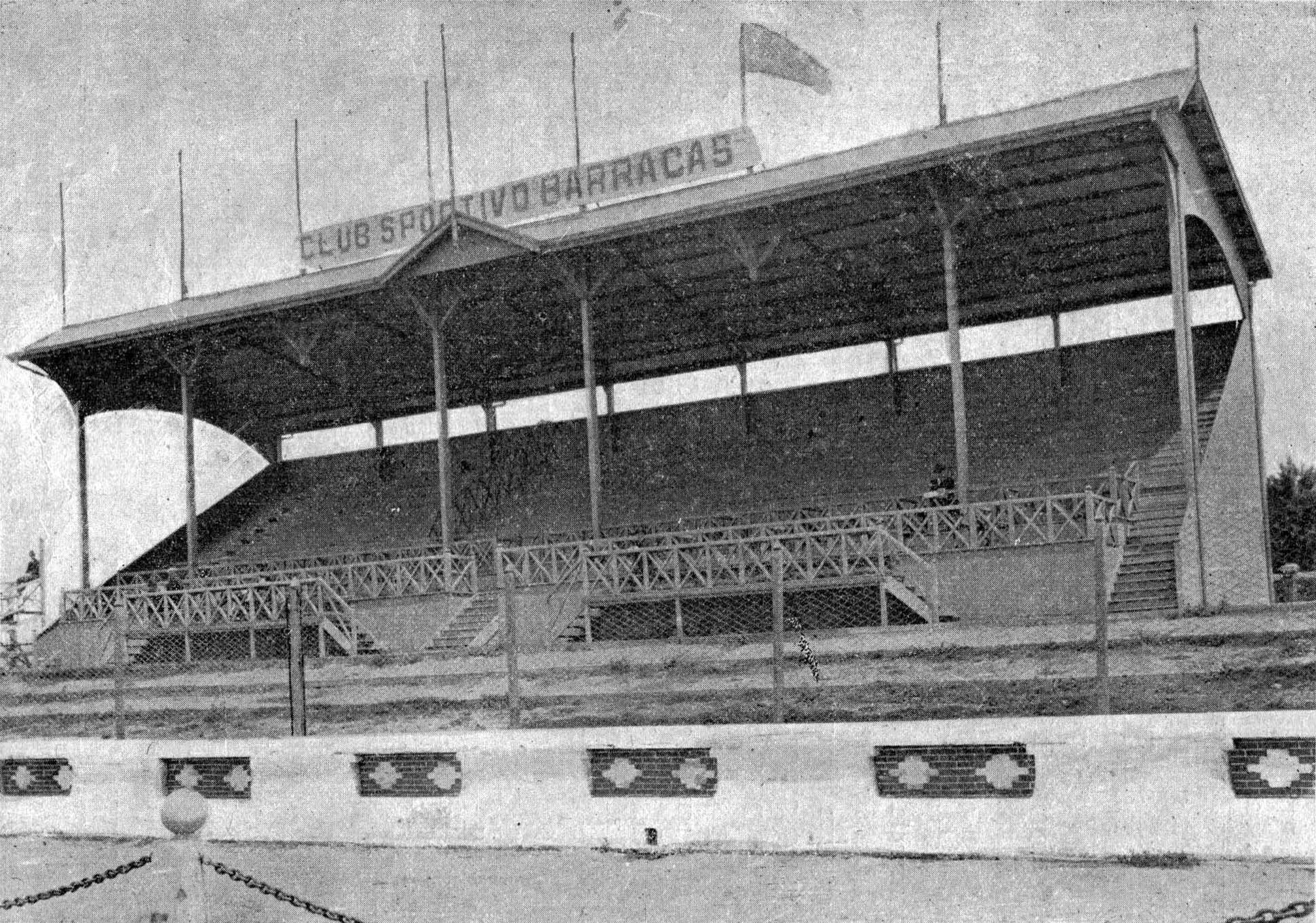
- View of the official grandstand of the stadium in the 1920s
- Interactive map of Sportivo Barracas
- Full name: Estadio Club Sportivo Barracas
- Address: Iriarte and Luzuriaga
- Location: Barracas, Buenos Aires
- Owner: Club Sportivo Barracas
- Capacity: 37,000
- Surface: Grass

Construction
- Opened: May 25, 1920; 106 years ago
- Demolished: 1937; 89 years ago

Tenants
- Sportivo Barracas (1920–37); Argentina national football team (1920–32)

Estadio Sportivo Barracas was a football stadium in Buenos Aires, Argentina, property of Club Sportivo Barracas. The stadium was one of the most important venues in Argentina, used for football and rugby union matches. It held 37,000 spectators.

== History ==
Sportivo Barracas promoted to the top division of Argentine football, Primera División, in 1916. Three years later the club started to build a stadium, on a land located on Iriarte, Luzuriaga, Río Cuarto and Perdriel streets of Barracas, Buenos Aires. The field was delimited by poles joined with chains. Between the grandstands and the field, a one-metre wall was built.

The stadium was first opened to public on May 25, 1920, when Boca Juniors beat Uruguayan Nacional by 2–1 in the 1919 Tie Cup final (that was played one year later). Nevertheless, the stadium was officially inaugurated on June 11, 1920, with a friendly tournament where the local team plus Rosarian clubs Newell's Old Boys and Tiro Federal.

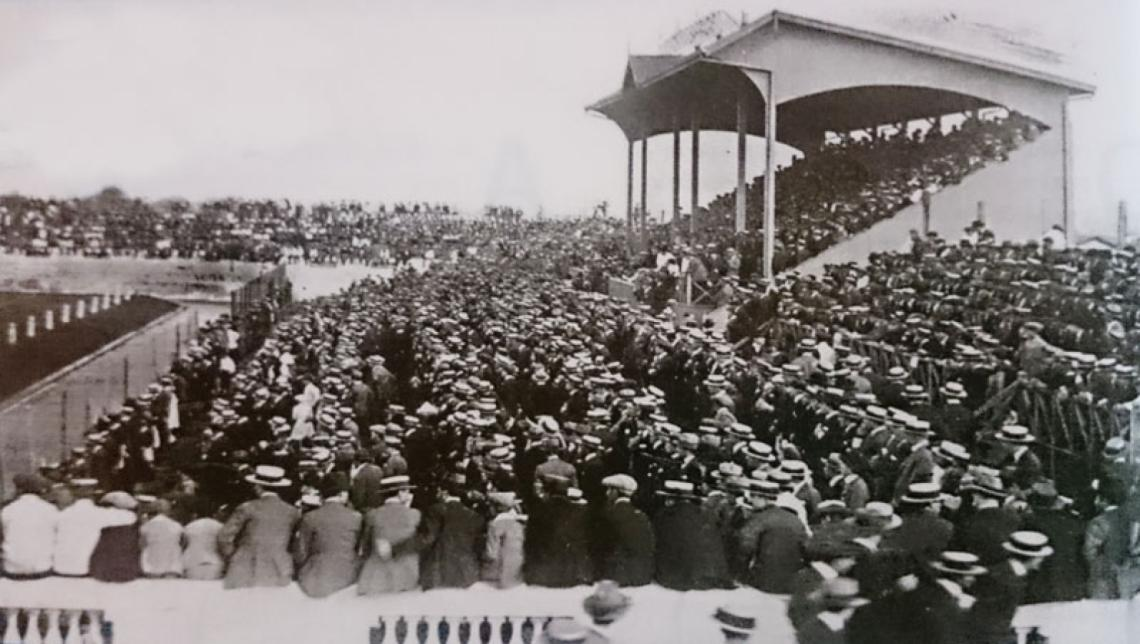
The crowd and the official grandstand during a 1921 Copa América match

Some of the most important football matches were played at Sportivo Barracas, including the 1920 Copa Newton, and the 1921 and 1925 Copa América. In April 1923, a roof was added to the official grandstand, on Luzuriaga street side.

The field was also used in 1924, when on April 5, Luis Ángel Firpo defeated Al Reich in the first boxing fight in open space in Argentina. The event was attended by 60,000 spectators.

In June and July 1924, English team Plymouth Argyle played three matches in Sportivo Barracas v. the Argentina national team

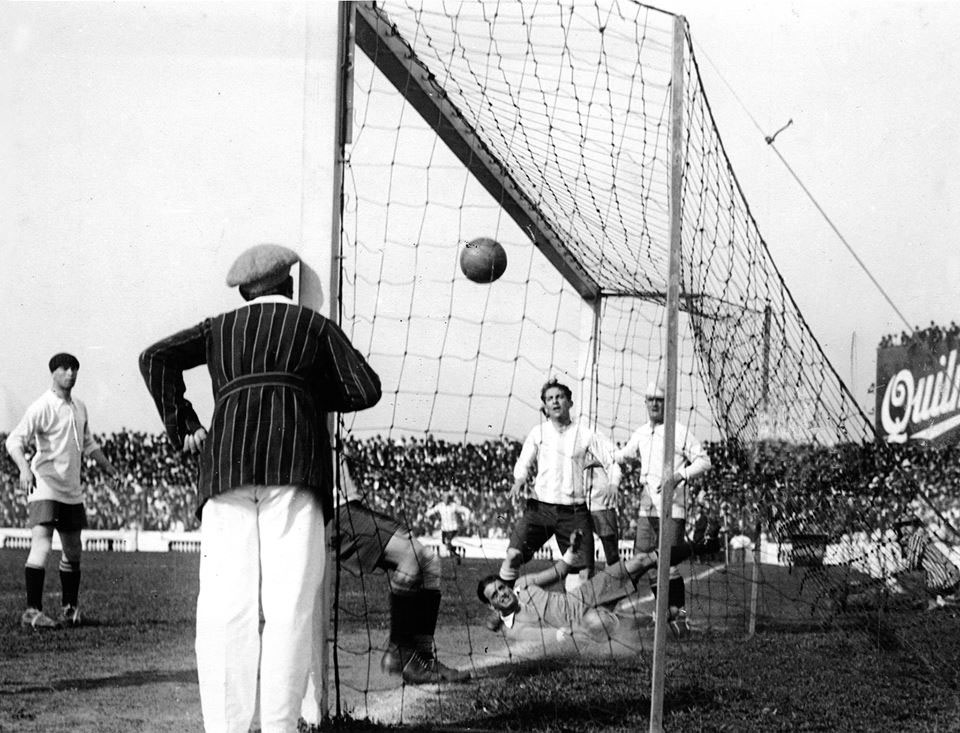
Cesáreo Onzari scored the first Olympic goal ever at Sportivo Barracas, 1924

The stadium holds an important anecdotal fact in its history, related to the match that took place between Argentina and Uruguay on October 2, 1924. In June of that year, Uruguay had attained the Olympic football crown at Paris, which at that moment was a kind of unofficial world title, since the World Cup was not played until 1930. The rivalry between Argentina and Uruguay was already an important one, so the match generated much expectancy. After the Uruguayan title, two matches were to be played between Uruguay and Argentina. The first one was in Montevideo and finished 1–1. The second one in Buenos Aires was to be played on September 28, but there were so many people at the stadium that day that the field itself was occupied by supporters. The Uruguayans asked for the suspension of the match and a perimeter to separate people from players on the next encounter, which was finally played on October 2, 1924.

That day, before playing the match, the Uruguayans celebrated their Olympic title by circumvallating the field, something described then as la vuelta de los olímpicos (the round of the Olympic ones), lately just vuelta olímpica (Olympic round). Argentina won that match 2–1 (Onzari 1–0 at 15’, Cea 1–1 at 29’, and Tarasconi 2–1 at 53’), but it was Onzari’s goal which was to be remembered, because it was converted directly from a corner kick. The International Board had specifically modified the football rules on this point on June 14, 1924, allowing goals to be scored like that. Since then, a goal like Onzari’s is referred as a Gol olímpico or Olympic goal in almost all Latin America, and even some parts of Europe. It is the first time that an Olympic goal is called that way, and is also the debut of the expression vuelta olímpica in Latin America. Onzari was at that moment playing for Huracán.

For the 1925 Copa América, Sportivo Barracas was one of the venues (Boca Juniors was the other host), with three matches played there. In 1926 Spanish team RCD Espanyol (with legendary goalkeeper Ricardo Zamora) played three matches v. local combined and the Argentina national team. The national squad also played Real Madrid at Sportivo Barracas on July 9, 1927.

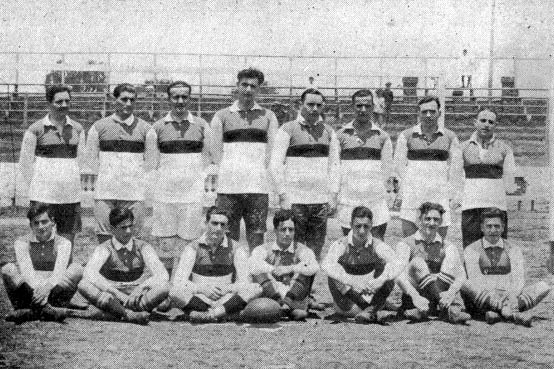
The stadium also hosted rugby union games. In the image, a team of Sportivo Barracas in 1929

Scottish club Motherwell played in Sportivo Barracas v. an Argentine combined on May 20, 1928. That same year, FC Barcelona was beat by the Argentina national team by 3–1 in the venue. Italian team Torino was other European club that played at the stadium.

At the beginning of the 1930s, the stadium was also used for other sports, such as hurling, rugby union, and basketball. The rugby team of Sportivo Barracas (in Second Division) played their home venues at the stadium since 1929. On the other hand, the Argentina national team played its last game at Sportivo Barracas on May 15, 1932, when the side beat Uruguay 2–0.

In 1937, Sportivo Barracas disaffiliated from the Argentine Football Association. The stadium was demolished that year. Previously, the last official game played there was on December 11, 1937, when Sportivo Barracas beat Sportivo Buenos Aires by 4–3.

=== Tenants ===
Teams that have played their home matches at Estadio Sportivo Barracas are:

Team	Period
Sportivo Barracas football team	1920–1937
Sportivo Barracas rugby team	1929–?
Argentina national football team	1920–1932

=== Events hosted ===
Along its existence, the stadium hosted several sports events, the following list compiles some of the most relevant:

Event	Sport	Year/s
Tie Cup	Football	1919
Copa Premier Honor Argentino	Football	1920
Copa Aldao	Football	1920
Copa América	Football	1921, 1925
Copa Newton	Football	1922, 1922, 1924
Copa Lipton	Football	1923
Primera División Finals	Football	1923, (Note: Sp. Barracas hosted the Boca Juniors v Huracán final, playing there the 1st and 2nd legs, and the 2nd. playoff (out of four matches) 1925
Copa Roca	Football	1923
Luis Ángel Firpo v Al Reich	Boxing	1924

Notes

Preceded by Valparaiso Sporting Club; Viña del Mar	Campeonato Sudamericano; Venue; 1921	Succeeded by Estádio das Laranjeiras; Rio de Janeiro
Preceded by Parque Central; Montevideo	Campeonato Sudamericano; Venue; 1925	Succeeded by Campos Sports de Ñuñoa; Santiago
