= Corner kick =

Method of returning the ball in association football

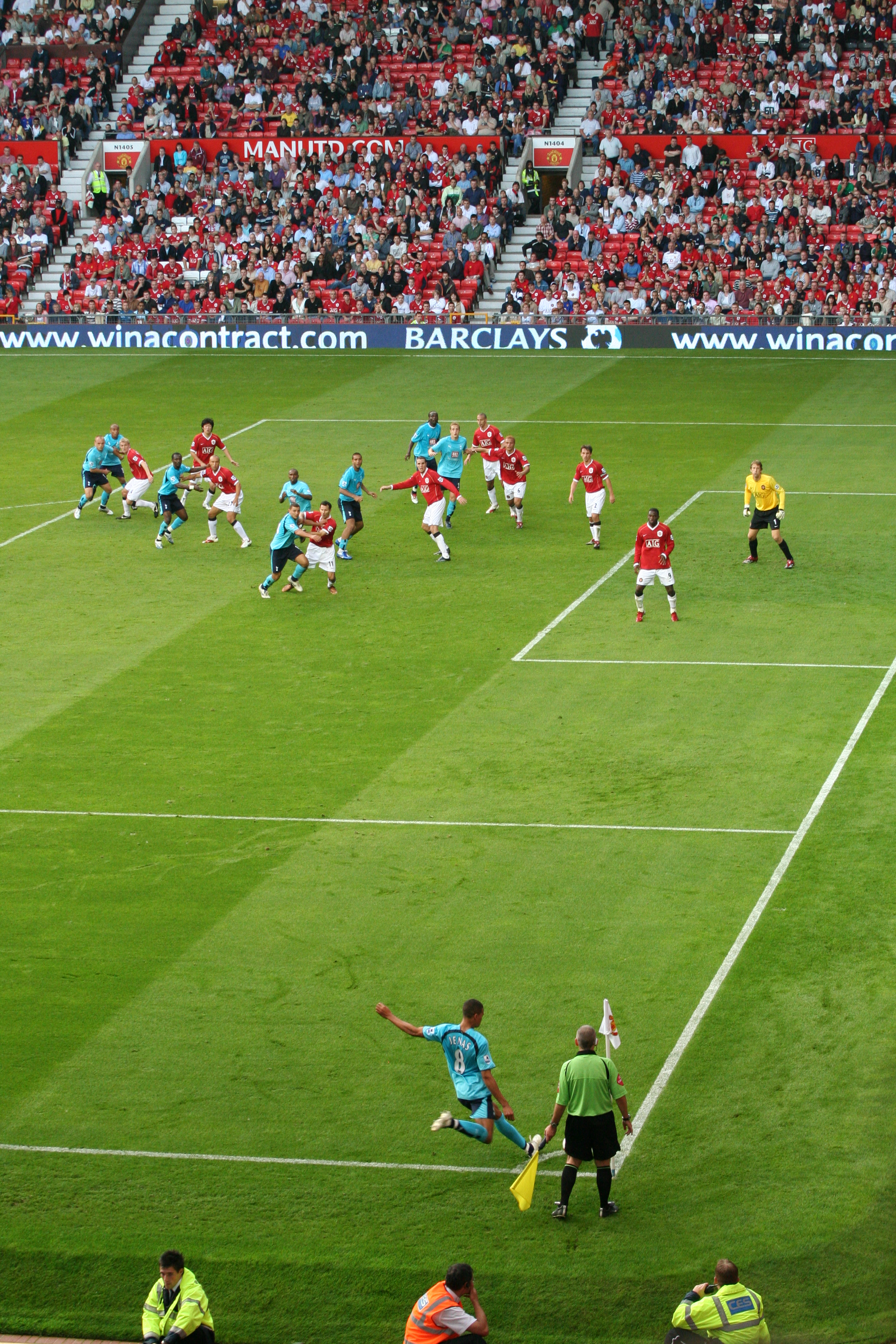
Jermaine Jenas (Tottenham Hotspur) taking a corner kick against Manchester United. The Tottenham players (blue) attempt to move into position to direct the corner towards the goal, while the United players (red, with goalkeeper in yellow) attempt to defend. The assistant referee (green, with flag) ensures that the corner is taken from inside the quarter-circle area.

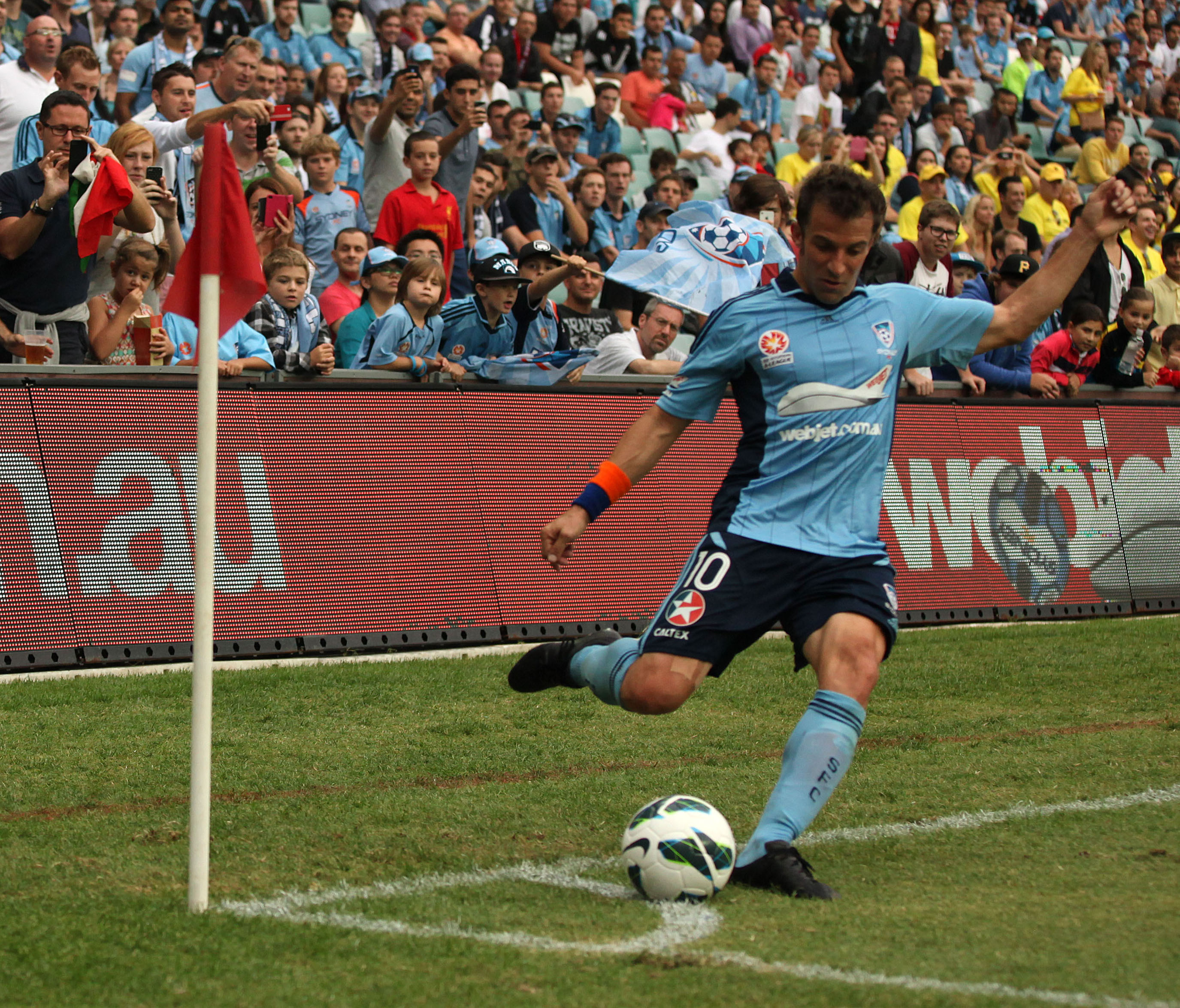
Alessandro Del Piero takes a corner kick for Sydney FC.

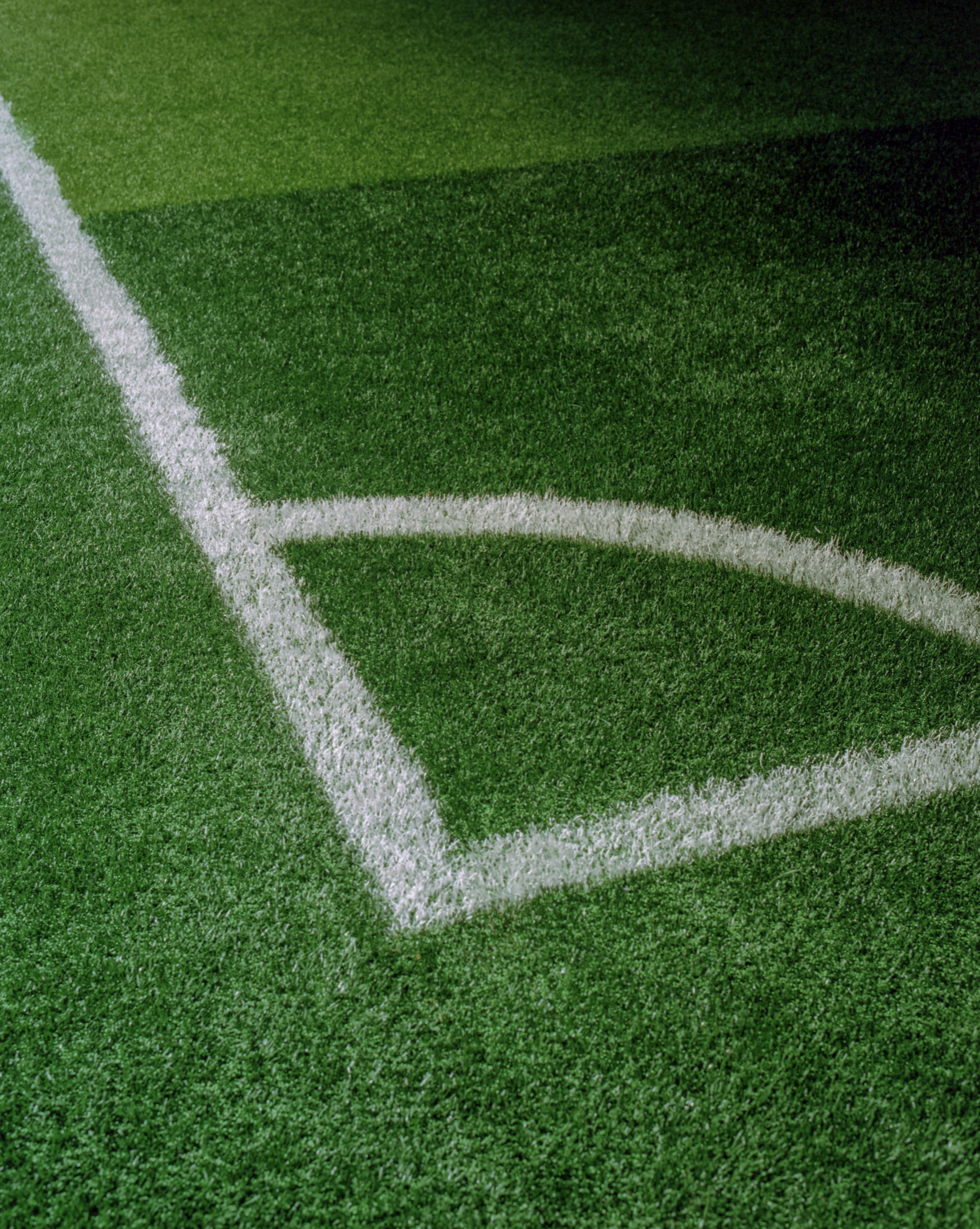
Corner area of the football field.

A corner kick, commonly known as a corner, is the method of returning the ball in a game of association football when the ball goes out of play over the goal line, without a goal being scored and having last been touched by a member of the defending team. The kick is taken from the corner of the field of play nearer to the place where the ball crossed the goal line.

Corners are considered to be a reasonable goal-scoring opportunity for the attacking side, though not as much as a penalty kick or a direct free kick near the edge of the penalty area.

A corner kick that scores without being touched by another player is called an Olimpico goal,.

== Award ==
=== Ball going out of play having been touched last by defending side ===
A corner kick is awarded when the ball wholly crosses the goal line outside of the goal frame having been last touched by a member of the team defending that end of the pitch. For the purposes of this rule, it does not matter if this touch is deliberate; it is permissible to kick the ball at an opponent to win a corner kick.

A corner kick is also awarded instead of an own goal when the ball enters a team's goal, having been last touched by a member of the defending team, in the following rare situations:

- directly from a kick-off, free kick (whether direct or indirect), throw-in, goal kick, or corner kick.
- from a dropped ball, if the ball has not been touched by at least two players.

The corner kick is taken from whichever corner was closer to the point where the ball went out of play.

=== Penalisation for delaying play ===
Beginning in 2025, should a goalkeeper hold on to the ball for more than eight seconds, a corner kick is awarded to the opposing side from the nearer corner to where this occurred. This rule was implemented to deter time-wasting and such penalisations are expected to be rare.

From 2026, a corner kick can be awarded to the opposition to penalise excessive delays in taking a goal kick. This occurs if the kick is not taken within five seconds of a warning from the referee.

== Procedure ==
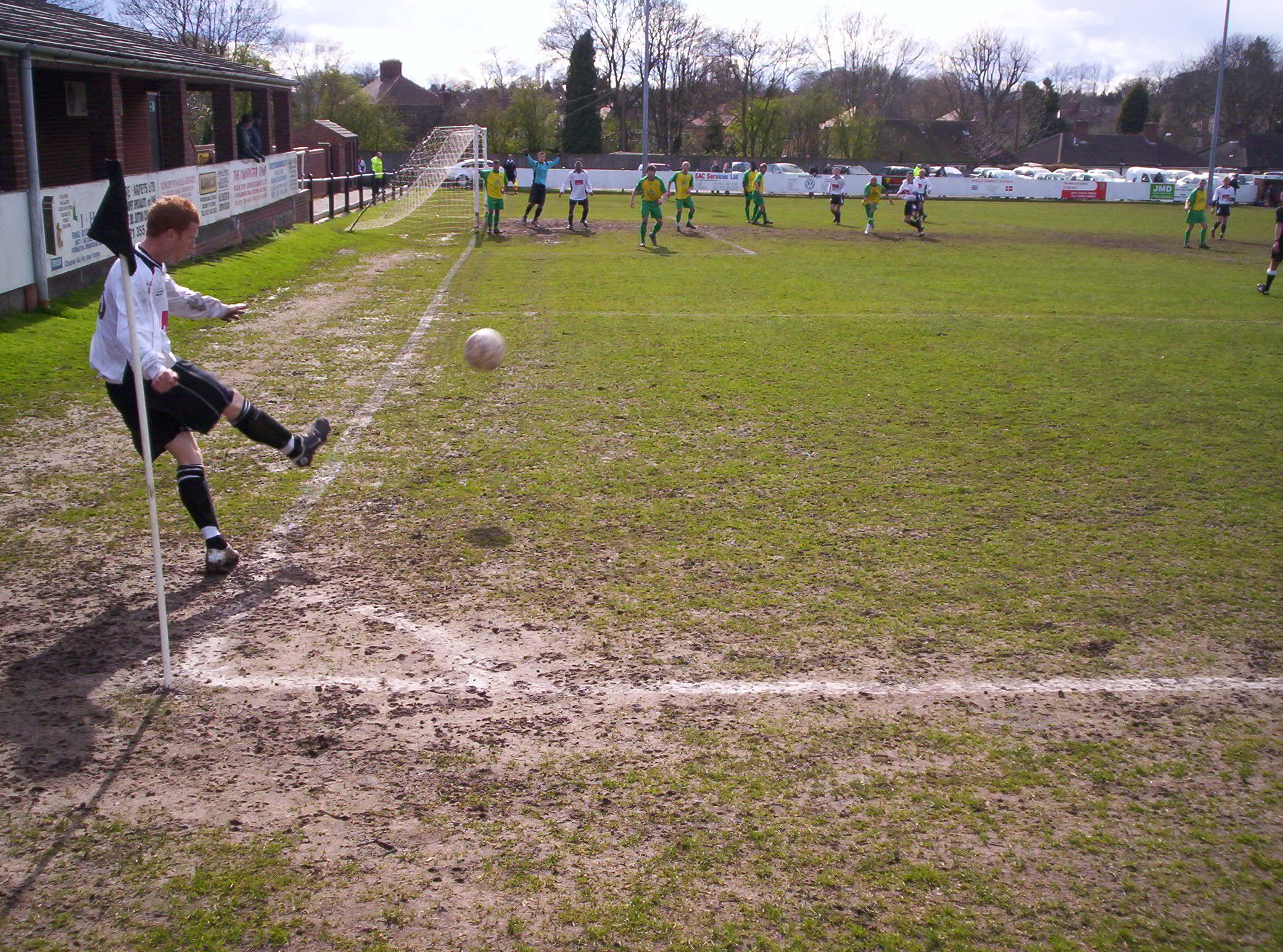
Player takes a corner kick

- The assistant referee will signal that a corner should be awarded by first raising his flag, then using it to point at the corner area on their side of the pitch; however, this is not an indication of which side the kick should be taken from. The referee signals the corner by pointing, with an upward extension of the arm, to the corner area from which the kick is to be taken.
- The ball must be stationary and on the ground within the corner area formed by a quarter circle with a radius of one yard (1 metre) from the corner flagpost inside the field of play.
- All opposing players must be at least 10 yards (9.15 metres) from the corner area until the ball is in play. Marks may optionally be made on the goal line and touchline at a distance of 10 yards from the corner area to assist the referee in enforcing this provision.
- The ball is in play when it is kicked and clearly moves; it does not need to leave the corner area.
- The player taking the corner kick may not touch the ball a second time before it has touched another player.
- The attacking side may score directly from a corner kick, though this is uncommon. An own goal may not be scored directly: in the extremely unlikely event of the ball going directly into the attacking team's own goal from a corner kick, a corner kick would be awarded to the opposing side.
- An attacking player who directly receives the ball from a corner kick cannot be penalised for offside.

=== Infringements ===
If the kick is taken with a moving ball, or from the wrong place, the corner kick is retaken.

Opposing players must retire the required distance as stated above. Failure to do so promptly may constitute misconduct and be punished by a yellow card.

A player who excessively delays the restart of play is cautioned.

It is an offence for the kicker to touch the ball a second time before it has been touched by another player; this is punishable by an indirect free kick to the defending team from where the offence occurred, unless the second touch was also a more serious handling offence, in which case a direct free kick is awarded to the defending team.

=== Tactics in taking and defending a corner ===
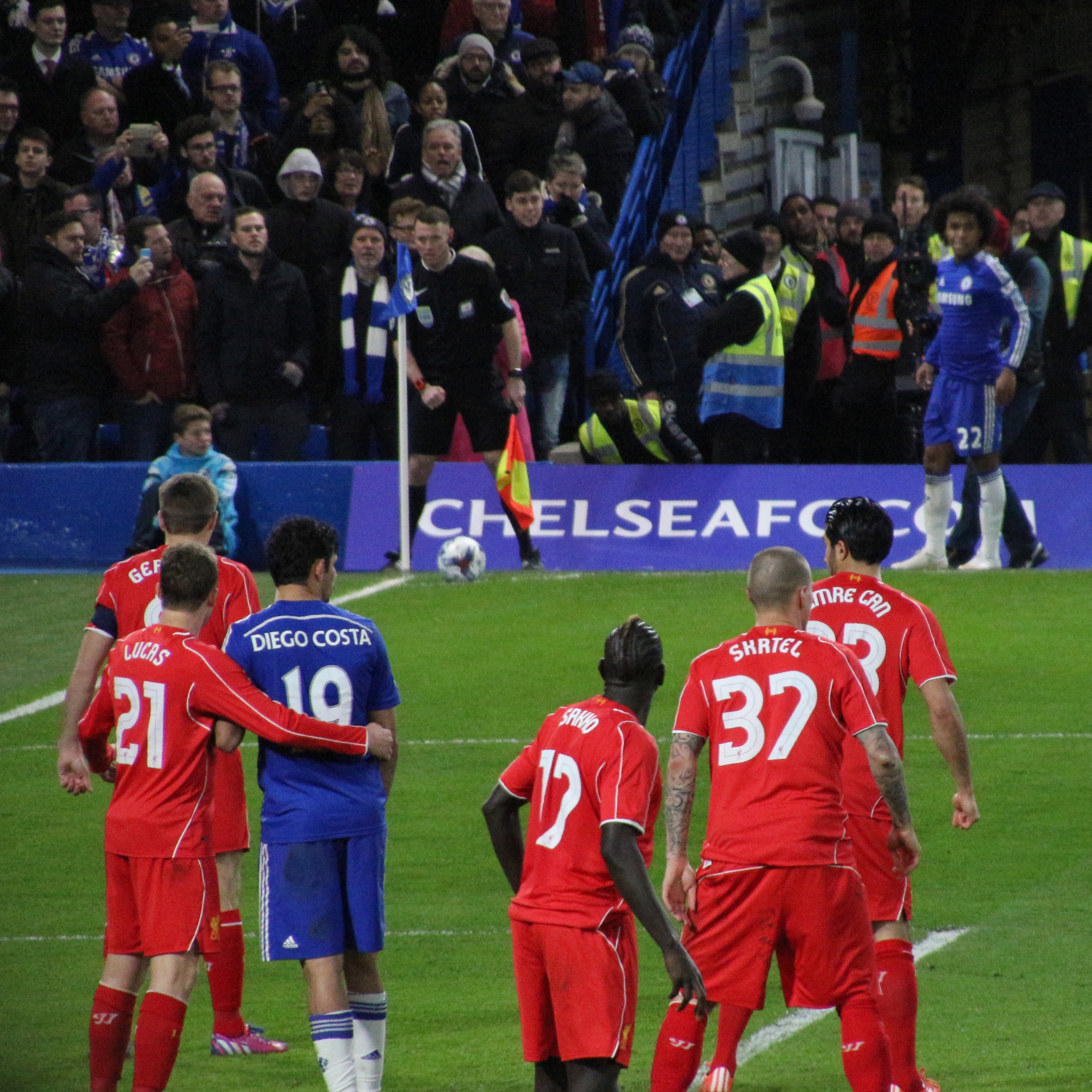
Liverpool (red) players prepare to defend a Chelsea (blue) corner.

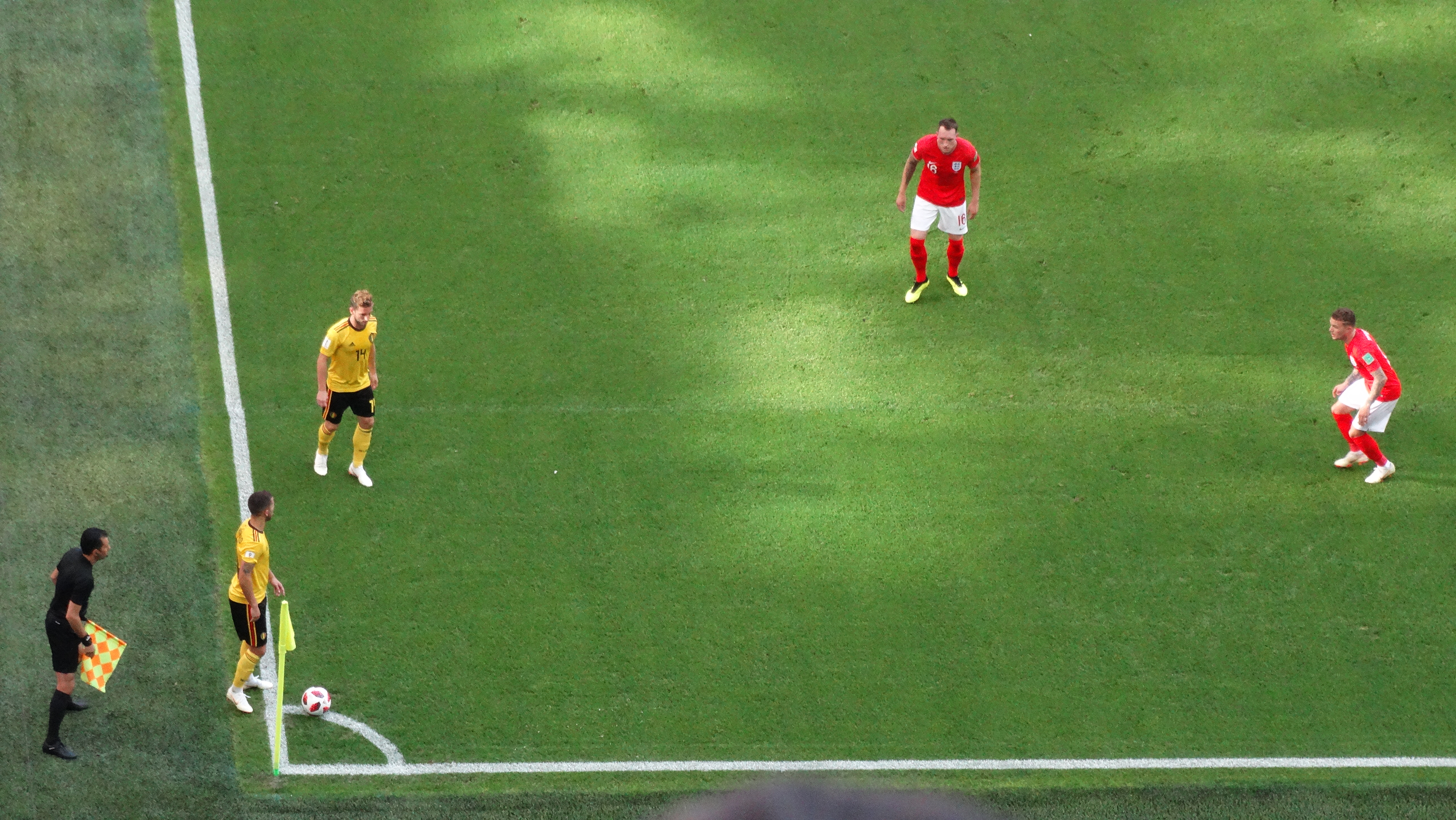
Eden Hazard of Belgium (left, yellow) has the option to play a short corner against England (red) at the 2018 FIFA World Cup.

A common tactic is for several attackers to stand close in front of the goal, whereupon the corner taker crosses the ball for them to head into the goal.

The defending team may choose to form a wall of players in an attempt to force the ball to be played to an area which is more easily defended. However, this is not done often because defending players must remain at least 10 yards from the ball until it is in play.

The defending team also has the choice of whether to instruct a player to adopt a position beside one or both of the goalposts to provide protection to the goal in addition to the goalkeeper. The thinking behind placing a player beside a goalpost is that it means more of the goal area is protected and there is no loss in the ability to play an offside trap because offside does not apply for the first touch from a corner, and it compensates for a keeper's positioning or reach.

The defending team also has to decide how many players it needs to defend a corner. Teams may withdraw every player into a defensive area, however this diminishes the potential for a counter-attack if possession is regained, and as such, allows the attacking side to commit more players to attacking the goal. Withdrawing all players into a defensive area also means that if the ball is cleared from an initial cross, it is more than likely that the attacking team will regain possession of the ball and begin a new attack.

In situations where a set-piece, such as a corner, is awarded to a side trailing by a single goal at the closing stages of a match where conceding further is of minimal consequence (i.e. in a knockout tournament) a team may commit all their players, including their goalkeeper, to the attack.

==== Man versus zonal marking ====
Two popular strategies used for defending corners are called man marking and zonal marking. Man marking involves each defensive player at a corner being given an attacking player to defend, with their objective being to stop the attacking player from heading the ball. The other tactic, zonal marking, involves allocating each player to an area of the box to defend (their "zone"). The objective for players in zonal marking is to get to the ball first if it enters their zone and head it away from danger before an attacking player can reach it.

==== Alternate tactics ====
Rather than the kicker attempting a cross, an alternative strategy for the attacking team is the short corner. The ball is passed to a player close the kicker, to create a better angle of approach toward the goal.

Teams attempting to time-waste may keep the ball in the corner of the pitch for as long as possible rather than attempt an attack.

== Scoring a goal directly from a corner: Olimpico goal ==
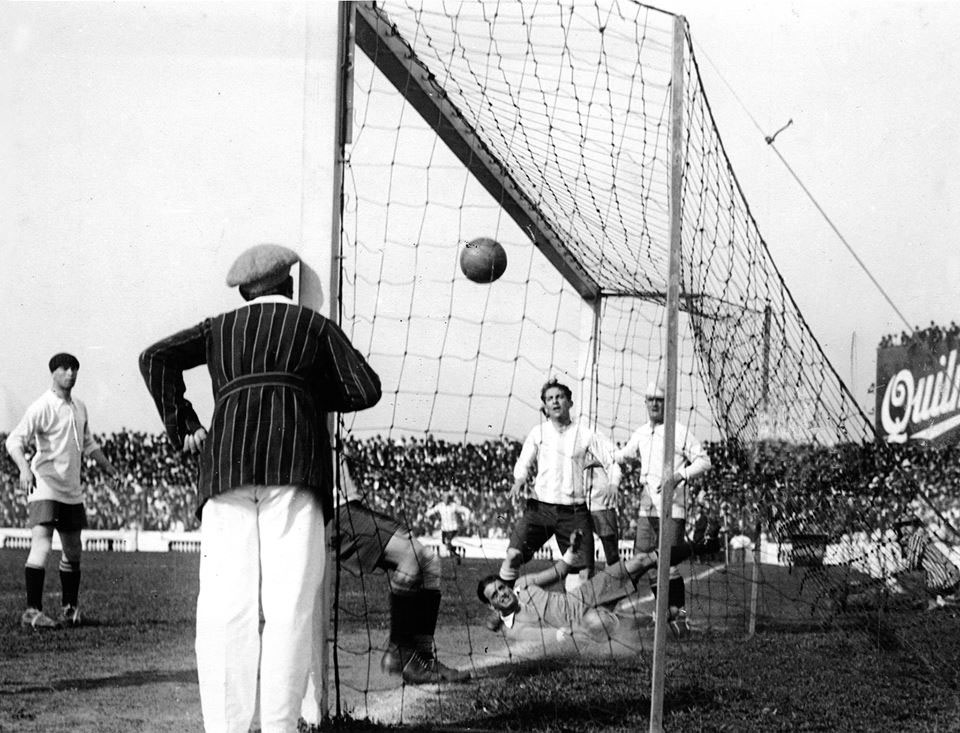
Cesáreo Onzari scores a goal for Argentina against Uruguay at Estadio Sportivo Barracas. This was the first goal scored direct from a corner kick, in 1924.

It is possible to score with a corner kick if sufficient swerve is given to the kick or if wind is blowing toward the goal. The goalkeeper is usually considered at fault if a goal is scored from a corner.

This type of rare goal is called an Olympic goal or Olimpico goal. On 14 June 1924, the IFAB formally legalized scoring in this manner; the first such goal was scored on 2 October 1924 by Argentina's Cesáreo Onzari against Uruguay, who had just won the 1924 Olympic title.

For decades, English speakers generally used the term Olympic goal. But the 21st century has seen the rise in the use of Olimpico goal, derived from the Spanish and Portuguese term gol olímpico widely used in Latin America. Max Bretos has used it on Fox Soccer Channel in the United States, reflecting Latino influence on the sport's culture there. Virtually all reports of Megan Rapinoe's goal for the United States in the bronze medal match at the 2020 Tokyo Olympics referred to it as an Olimpico goal.

One of the rarest types of goals, there has been only five players in the history of the UEFA Champions League to achieve the feat within the tournament; Christian Pulisic, Ángel Di María, Claudio López, Ørjan Berg, and André Cruz. There has been only 21 Olympico goals in the history of the Premier League.

=== Notable examples ===
- Although FIFA states the first goal from a corner was scored by Billy Alston in Scotland on 21 August 1924, in fact, Alston's goal was from a header two days later on 23 August 1924, when Alston scored for St Bernard's F.C. in a Scottish Second Division match against Albion Rovers F.C.
- The first recorded Olimpico goal in England was by Huddersfield Town's Billy Smith on 11 October 1924.
- In 1946, Brazilian striker Ary Mantovani was the first player to ever score two Olimpico goals in a single match, playing for Palmeiras against Portuguesa Santista in the Campeonato Paulista of that year.
- Portuguese footballer João Morais scored directly from a corner for Sporting Clube de Portugal in the 1964 European Cup Winners' Cup Final, eventually deciding the match and the destiny of the trophy.
- The first Olimpico at the men's World Cup was achieved in a group stage match of the 1962 edition between Colombia and the Soviet Union by Marcos Coll, although new reports from Cuba indicated that José Magriñá had done it against Romania in 1938.
- Steve Staunton scored two Olimpico goals for the Republic of Ireland: the first against Portugal in the 1992 U.S. Cup (7 June 1992), and the second against Northern Ireland in the 1994 World Cup qualifiers on 31 March 1993.
- Dejan Petković scored eight Olimpico goals in his career.
- In January 2012, Paul Owens took advantage of strong winds to score two goals directly from corners in the second half of Coleraine's 3–1 win over Glenavon in the Irish Premiership.
- Megan Rapinoe from the United States scored the first Olimpico goal at the Olympic Games in the 2012 women's semi-final match against Canada, as well as in the 2020 bronze medal match against Australia.
- In Vietnam's 7–0 defeat of Malaysia at the 2015 AFF Women's Championship on home soil, Nguyễn Thị Tuyết Dung scored two goals directly from corners on either side and with either foot. She also scored another Olimpico against regional rivals Myanmar at the 2022 AFC Women's Asian Cup.
- At the 2019 FIFA Women's World Cup, Elise Kellond-Knight scored directly from a corner in the 83rd minute for Australia to bring the score to 1–1 against Norway. Norway went on to win the match on penalties.
- Melbourne Victory won the 2021 W-League grand final after Kyra Cooney-Cross scored directly from a corner in the 120th minute.
- Mohsin Al-Khaldi scored directly from a corner to put Oman in the lead against Vietnam in the third round of qualification for the 2022 FIFA World Cup. He could have scored one more against China, but the goal was credited to Amjad Al-Harthi instead.
- Manchester United women midfielder Katie Zelem scored two Olimpico goals in a 4–0 win against Leicester City on 6 March 2022 in the FA Women's Super League.
- Douglas Luiz scored directly from a corner in Aston Villa's 2–1 defeat to Arsenal in the Premier League on 31 August 2022. It was the second time in a week he scored directly from a corner after scoring the same goal against Bolton Wanderers in Aston Villa's 4–1 win over them in the EFL Cup.
- Claire Emslie scored directly from a corner for Angel City FC in their National Women's Soccer League match against OL Reign which ultimately finished as a 4–1 defeat on May 23, 2023.
- Katie McCabe scored directly from a corner in the Republic of Ireland's FIFA Women's World Cup 1–2 group stage defeat to Canada on 26 July 2023.
- Tristan Borges scored an Olimpico as the game-winning goal in extra time of the 2023 Canadian Premier League final to secure the league championship for Forge FC in a 2–1 win over Cavalry FC.
- James Ward-Prowse scored an Olimpico as the game-winning goal in West Ham United's 2–1 win against Wolverhampton Wanderers in a Premier League match on 6 April 2024.
- Christian Pulisic scored an Olimpico in AC Milan's 3–1 UEFA Champions League win over Club Brugge on 22 October 2024.
- Heung-min Son scored an Olimpico as the fourth goal in Tottenham Hotspur's 4–3 win against Manchester United in a League Cup quarterfinal match on 19 December 2024.
- Matheus Cunha scored an Olimpico in Wolverhampton Wanderers' 2–0 win against Manchester United in a Premier League match on 26 December 2024.
- Neymar scored an Olimpico in Santos' 3–0 win against Inter de Limeira in a Campeonato Paulista match on 23 February 2025.
- Sebastian Szymański scored directly from a corner for Poland against Lithuania during 2026 FIFA World Cup qualification.
- Marcus Tavernier scored an Olimpico in AFC Bournemouth's 2–0 win over Nottingham Forest in a Premier League match on 26 October 2025.
- Bruno Guimarães scored Newcastle United's first Premier League Olimpico on 6 December 2025 in a 2–1 victory over Burnley.
- Cloé Lacasse scored an Olimpico for the Utah Royals in the semifinals of the 2026 NWSL playoffs, which ended as a 2–1 win for the Washington Spirit.

== Corner instead of own goal from restart ==
Most methods of restarting the game do not permit the scoring of an own goal directly from the restart; (Note: A theoretical exception is the penalty kick; however, since the ball must be kicked forward, an own goal from a penalty kick would require an extraordinary set of circumstances to occur, for example, the ball to hit the crossbar and then travel the entire length of the pitch, going into the kicker's own goal.) if the ball enters the goal directly, a corner is awarded instead. This is the case for the kick-off, goal kick, (Note: This was explicitly added to the Laws of the Game in 2016, having previously been an official IFAB interpretation.) dropped ball, (Note: This was added to the Laws of the Game in 2012, in order to prevent scoring a goal on an "uncontested" dropped ball. A corner kick is only awarded if the ball enters the own goal directly from the first touch after a properly taken dropped ball; an improperly taken dropped ball is retaken.) throw-in, corner kick, and free kick (direct or indirect). Such incidents are extremely rare, and in some cases require unusual or extraordinary circumstances in order to occur (for example, a ball from a corner kick would have to travel the entire length of the field and enter the kicker's own goal without being touched by any other player).

In a 1983–84 English Third Division match, Millwall were incorrectly credited with a goal against Wimbledon rather than a corner, when Wally Downes' free-kick backpass eluded an off-guard Dave Beasant. In a 2002–03 FA Premier League match, Birmingham City scored against their local rivals Aston Villa when Olof Mellberg's throw-in backpass was missed by Villa goalkeeper Peter Enckelman, who reacted with dismay but later claimed he had made no contact and the goal should not have been awarded. His reaction may have persuaded referee David Elleray that Enckelman had grazed the ball; manager Graham Taylor suggested it showed he was unaware of the corner rule, a charge Enckelman denied.

== History ==
=== Background ===
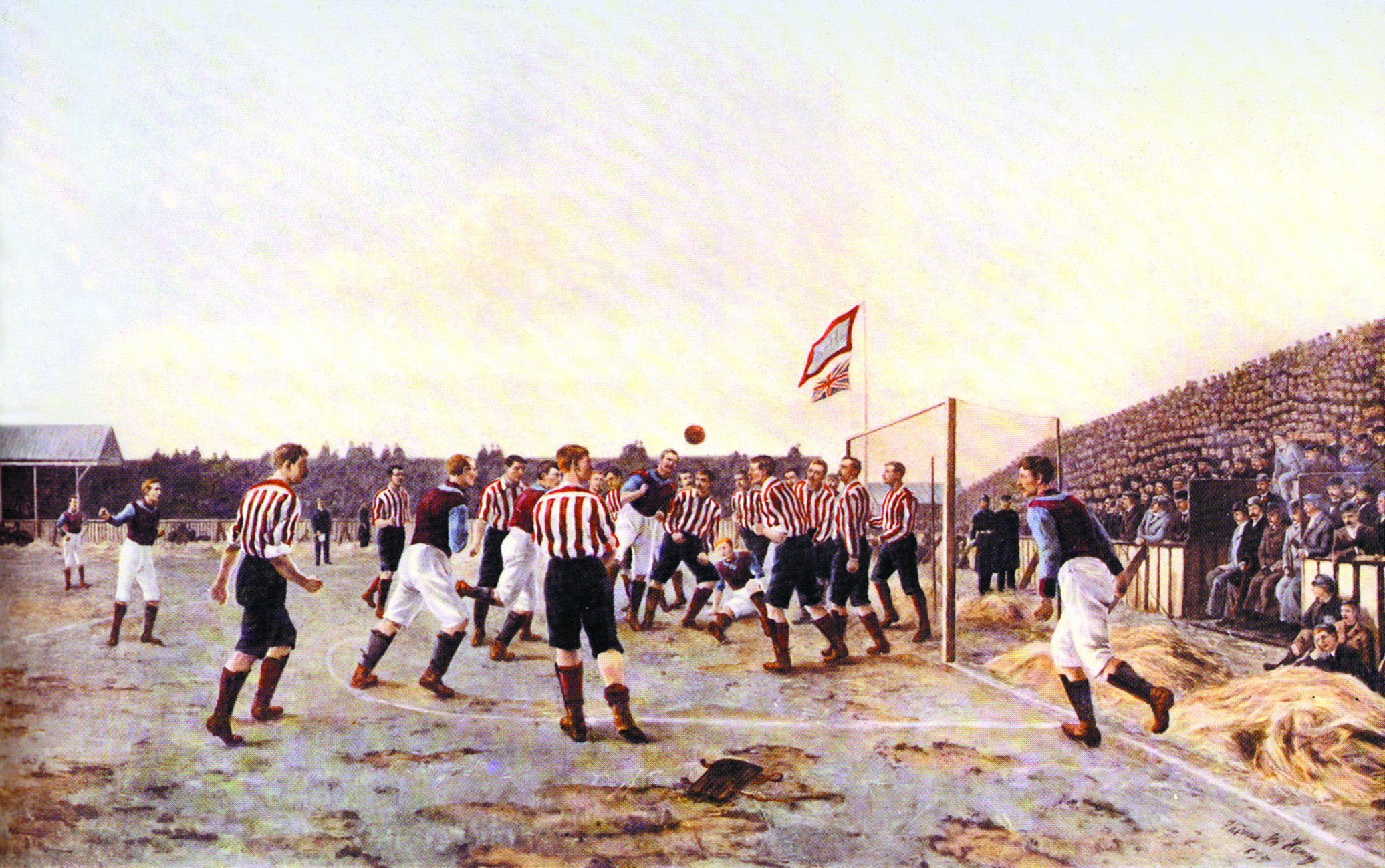
1895 painting, "A Corner Kick", by Thomas M.M. Hemy, depicting an 1895 match between Sunderland and Aston Villa

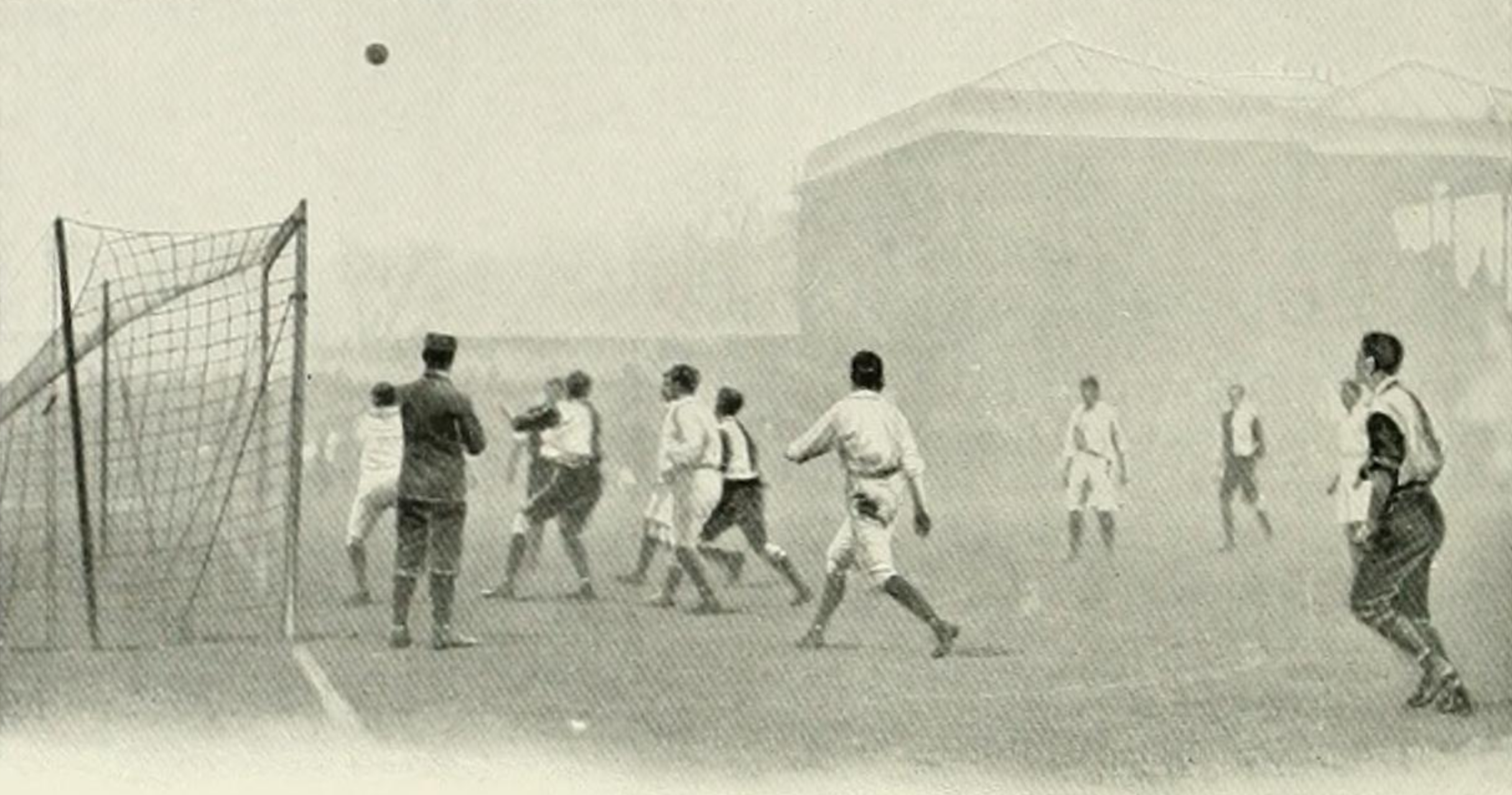
A corner-kick in the annual Oxford v Cambridge match (photograph published 1905)

Under the original 1863 rules of the Football Association, a ball kicked behind the goal-line was treated similarly to present-day rugby: if an attacking player touched the ball down first, the attacking team was awarded a free-kick at goal (similar to a conversion in rugby), while if a defending player touched the ball down first, the defending team was awarded a goal-kick. These rules were subsequently simplified, so that by 1867 a goal-kick was awarded in all circumstances, regardless of which team touched the ball.

During this period, clubs around Sheffield played their own distinctive code of football. The laws promulgated in early March 1867 by the newly formed Sheffield Football Association contained a similar rule: a goal-kick was awarded whenever the ball went behind the goal-line, regardless of which team touched the ball.

One problem with these early rules was mentioned at the 1867 FA meeting:

Where one side was very much weaker than the other, a very great deal of time was wasted by players intentionally letting the ball go behind their own goal-line (in some instances kicking it there themselves) particularly in playing against time.

=== Introduction in Sheffield rules ===
An early law providing for a throw-in from the corner flag had already been used by the Sheffield Mechanics' Football Club for the 1865–66 season:

When the ball is in touch, the side that first touches it must bring it to the edge of the touch at the place where it went in, and throw it straight out at least six yards, and it must touch the ground before coming in contact with any player, except it be kicked out at the goal-sides, then it must be taken to the corner-flag and thrown in.

The corner-kick itself was suggested in a letter to the editor of the Sheffield Daily Telegraph published on 22 March 1867. The author, writing under the pseudonym "Rouge", argued that the then-current rule was "a great inducement to foul and dishonourable play, for it is manifestly to the advantage of a defending side to allow the ball to pass their goal line, they having the great advantage or a free kick-off". Instead, Rouge suggested, "when the ball is kicked behind the goal-line, the players [should] run for touch, and the side winning the touch, kicks in from the nearest corner-flag".

The corner-kick was introduced to Sheffield football the following year, as the result of a rule-change proposed by Norfolk F.C. The law, adopted in October 1868, ran:

When the ball is kicked over the bar of the goal, it must be kicked-off by the side behind whose goal it went, within six yards from the limit of their goal. The side who thus kick the ball are entitled to a fair kick-off in whatever way they please; the opposite side not being allowed to approach within six yards of the ball. When the ball is kicked behind the goal line, a player of the opposite side to that which kicked it out, shall kick it in from the nearest corner-flag; no player to be allowed within six yards of the ball until kicked.

This Sheffield form of the corner-kick had two significant differences from today's version:

- The corner-kick could be awarded to either the attacking or the defending team, depending on which team kicked the ball behind the goal-line.
- When the ball was kicked directly over the crossbar, by either team, a goal-kick was awarded to the defending team.

The Sheffield clubs would retain this form of the corner-kick rule until they adopted the FA's rules wholesale in 1877.

=== Introduction in association football ===
In 1872, the Sheffield Association successfully introduced the corner-kick into the Football Association's code. The new FA rule was identical to the Sheffield rule, as described above.

=== 1873 changes ===
The next year, 1873, the FA rule was rewritten, under a proposal by Great Marlow FC, to essentially its current form:

- When the attacking team kicked the ball behind the goal-line, a goal-kick was awarded to the defending team
- When the defending team kicked the ball behind the goal-line, a corner-kick was awarded to the attacking team.

The FA rule of 1873 stated:

When the ball is kicked behind the goal-line by one of the opposite side, it shall be kicked off by any one of the players behind whose goal line it went, within six yards of the nearest goal post; but if kicked behind by any one of the side whose goal line it is, a player of the opposite side shall kick it from the nearest corner flag-post. In either case no other player shall be allowed within six yards of the ball until kicked off.

=== Subsequent developments ===
==== Name ====
The name "corner-kick" first appears in the laws of 1883. Before this, the phrase "corner-flag kick" was used (1875).

==== Position of the kick ====
In 1874, the kick was allowed to be taken from within one yard of the corner-flag, rather than from the flag itself.

==== Position of other players ====
Initially, all other players were forbidden to be within six yards of the ball at a corner-kick; this was altered to all opposing players in 1888. In 1913 and 1914, the distance was increased from six yards to ten yards. In 2006, the minimum distance was specified as ten yards from the corner area, rather than from the ball.

==== Putting the ball into play ====
In 1905, it was specified that the ball "must make a complete circuit or travel the distance of its circumference" before being in play. In 1997, this requirement was eliminated: the ball became in play as soon as it was kicked and moved. In 2016, it was specified that the ball must "clearly" move.

==== Offside from a corner-kick ====
When first introduced in 1872, the corner-kick was required to be taken from the corner-flag itself, which made it impossible for an attacking player to be in an offside position directly from a corner. In 1874, the kick was allowed to be taken up to one yard from the corner-flag, thus opening up the possibility of a player being in an offside position by being ahead of the ball. At the International Football Conference of December 1882, it was agreed that a player should not be offside from a corner-kick; this change was incorporated into the Laws of the Game in 1883.

==== Scoring a goal from a corner-kick ====
When it was first introduced in 1872, there was no restriction on scoring a goal directly from a corner-kick. In 1875, this was forbidden, but it was subsequently legalised by the International Football Association Board (IFAB) meeting of 14 June 1924 with effect from for the following season, and is now referred to as an Olimpico goal. In 1997, the laws were amended to remove the possibility of scoring an own goal directly from a corner kick.

==== Touching the ball twice from a corner-kick ====
When initially introduced in 1872, there was no restriction on dribbling from a corner-kick. In 1875, this was changed: it was forbidden for a player to touch the ball again after taking a corner-kick, before the ball had been touched by another player.

In 1924, this restriction was accidentally removed, as an unintended consequence of the law-change allowing a goal to be scored directly from a corner. This possibility was exploited by Everton winger Sam Chedgzoy in a match against Arsenal on 15 November of that year. At the end of November, the International Football Association Board issued emergency instructions that dribbling was once again forbidden. The law was formally amended to prohibit dribbling at the next annual meeting of the Board, in 1925.

==== Punishment for infringement ====
In 1882, an indirect free-kick was awarded when the player taking the corner-kick touched the ball again before it had touched another player.

In 1905, an indirect free-kick was awarded for any infringement at a corner-kick.

These penalties were accidentally removed from the laws in 1924, as described above. In 1930, both penalties were reinstated. In 1973, the remedy for infringements other than the double touch was changed to a retake.

==== Pitch markings ====
The one-yard quarter-circle pitch marking is first explicitly mentioned in the Laws of the Game in 1938, but appears in the diagram of the pitch as early as 1902. In 1995, the Laws of the Game were updated to explicitly allow optional marks on the goal line 11 yards from the corner flag, at right angles to the goal-line, to aid the referee in enforcing the minimum distance from the corner kick. In 2008, similar optional marks were permitted at right angles to the touch lines. (In 1977, the Scottish FA had proposed an additional pitch-marking of a quarter-circle with a radius of 11 yards for this purpose, but the suggestion was rejected).

==== Use as a tiebreaker ====
In the early 1920s, some charity matches began using corner-kicks as a tie-breaker in order to avoid replays. In response, the laws of the game were amended in 1923 to state explicitly that the goal was the only means of scoring, and that a match that ended with equal number of goals scored was drawn. Despite this, the Dublin City Cup (until the 1960s) and Dublin and Belfast Inter-City Cup (in the 1940s) used corner count as a tiebreaker in knockout rounds. The use of corner-kicks in this manner was never approved by the International Football Association Board, and in 1970 IFAB endorsed the penalty shoot-out as its approved method of breaking ties.

==== Summary ====
This table includes only kicks from the corner flag awarded to the attacking team after the ball goes out of play over the goal line. For kicks awarded to the defending team, see the goal kick article.

Date	Awarded when	Location of corner-kick	Minimum distance required (team-mates)	Minimum distance required (opponents)	Kicker may play ball again before it is touched by another player	Attacking goal may be scored from a corner-kick	Own goal may be scored from a corner-kick	Player may be offside from a corner-kick
1863	Never	—N/a						
1872	Ball last touched by a player on the defending team, and ball did not go out of play directly over the goal	From the corner-flag itself	6 yards (5.49 meters)	6 yards (5.49 meters)	Yes	Yes	Yes	No
1873	Ball last touched by a player on the defending team	From the corner-flag itself	6 yards (5.49 meters)	6 yards (5.49 meters)	Yes	Yes	Yes	No
1874	Ball last touched by a player on the defending team	From within one yard of the corner-flag	6 yards (5.49 meters)	6 yards (5.49 meters)	Yes	Yes	Yes	Yes
1875	Ball last touched by a player on the defending team	From within one yard of the corner-flag	6 yards (5.49 meters)	6 yards (5.49 meters)	No	No	No	Yes
1883	Ball last touched by a player on the defending team	From within one yard of the corner-flag	6 yards (5.49 meters)	6 yards (5.49 meters)	No	No	No	No
1888	Ball last touched by a player on the defending team	From within one yard of the corner-flag	None	6 yards (5.49 meters)	No	No	No	No
1913,1914	Ball last touched by a player on the defending team	From within one yard of the corner-flag	None	10 yards (9.15 metres)	No	No	No	No
1924 (June)	Ball last touched by a player on the defending team	From within one yard of the corner-flag	None	10 yards (9.15 metres)	Yes	Yes	Yes	No
1924 (November)	Ball last touched by a player on the defending team	From within one yard of the corner-flag	None	10 yards (9.15 metres)	No	Yes	Yes	No
1997	Ball last touched by a player on the defending team	From within one yard of the corner-flag	None	10 yards (9.15 metres)	No	Yes	No	No
