= 1919 Tie Cup final =

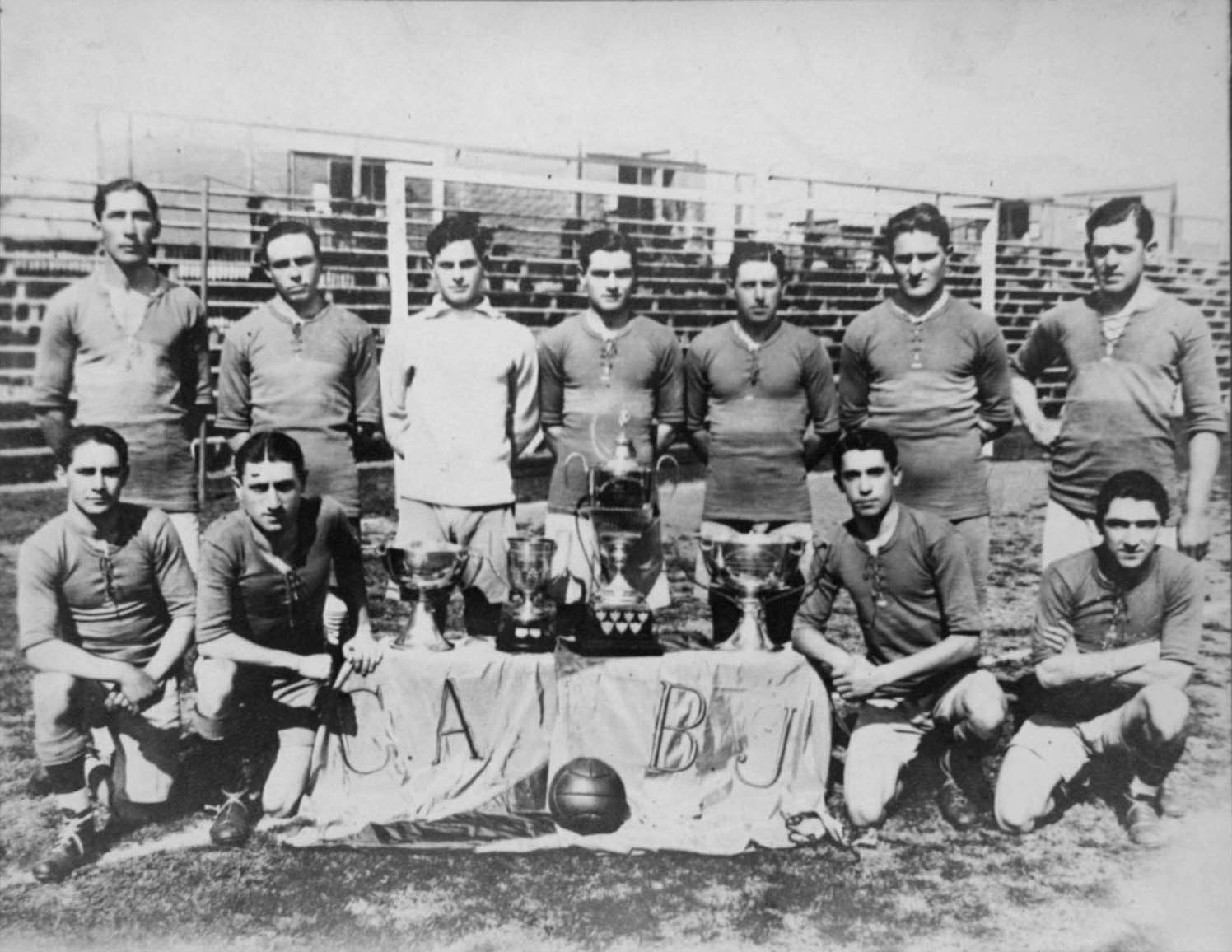
- A team of Boca Juniors in 1919. The Tie Cup is the biggest trophy
- Event: 1919 Tie Cup
Boca Juniors	Nacional
(Argentina)	(Uruguay)
2	0
- Date: May 25, 1920; 106 years ago
- Venue: Estadio Sportivo Barracas
- Man of the Match: Pedro Calomino
- Referee: Calixto Gardi
- Attendance: 12,000

The 1919 Tie Cup final was the 20th and last edition of this competition. It was contested by the champions of Copa de Competencia Jockey Club (Argentina) and Copa de Competencia (Uruguay).

Boca Juniors beat Nacional) at Estadio Sportivo Barracas, that hosted most international matches during that decade. The final was scheduled for May 1920.

== Qualified teams ==
Team	Qualification	Previous app.
(Argentina) Boca Juniors	1919 Copa de Competencia (A) champions	(none)
(Uruguay) Nacional	1919 Copa de Competencia (U) champions	3 (1912, **1913, 1915**)

- **Bold** indicates winning years

== Match ==
=== Summary ===
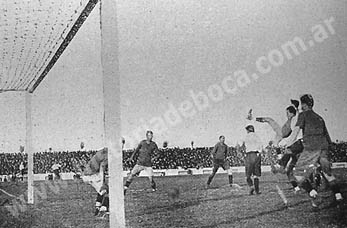
A moment of the match

Argentine newspaper Crítica defined the match (which also served to the inauguration of Estadio Sportivo Barracas) as "a brilliant performance from both teams". The newspaper noted the great amount of people that came to the stadium (an estimated attendance of 12,000), with trams running on the surrounding streets at their full capacity.

Although Nacional took the initiative, a shot by winger Pedro Miranda was saved by defender Alfredo Zibechi. Nacional's reply came when Angel Romano shot but it was caught by goalkeeper Américo Tesoriere. Nacional showed a faster attacking game while Boca Juniors made sporadic attempts to their opponents' goal.

With only 15 minutes played, Boca Juniors midfielder Mario Buzzo injured so he left the field. Despite playing with ten players most of the match (substitutions were not allowed by those times) the Argentine side scored its first goal on 32 minutes after an aerial pass by winger Pedro Calomino that goalkeeper Andrés Mazali could not intercept well, allowing Pedro Miranda to head the ball.

In the second half, Uruguayan defender Alfredo Foglino was injured after a collision so both teams played the rest of the match with 10 men each. Boca Juniors' second goal was scored by Pablo Bozzo after heading the ball by a pass from Calomino, regarded as the man of the match.

Crítica also praised the stadium, which it defined as "the best in Buenos Aires and South America"

=== Details ===
1919 Tie Cup
25 May 1920
14:50

Boca Juniors (Argentina)	2–0	(Uruguay) Nacional
Miranda 32'; Bozzo 75'	Report

Estadio Sportivo Barracas, Buenos Aires
Attendance: 12,000
Referee: Calixto Gardi (Argentina)

**Boca Juniors**	**Nacional**

GK	(Argentina) Américo Tesoriere
DF	(Argentina) Antonio Cortella
DF	(Argentina) José Ortega
MF	(Argentina) José A. López
MF	(Argentina) Mario Busso	(substituted off) 15'
MF	(Argentina) Alfredo Elli
FW	(Argentina) Pedro Calomino
FW	(Argentina) Pablo Bozzo
FW	(Argentina) Alfredo Garasini
FW	(Argentina) Alberto Martín
FW	(Argentina) Pedro Miranda

GK	(Uruguay) Andrés Mazali
DF	(Uruguay) Antonio Urdinarán
DF	(Uruguay) Alfredo Foglino (substituted off)
MF	(Uruguay) Pedro Olivieri
MF	(Uruguay) Alfredo Zibechi
MF	(Uruguay) José Vanzzino
FW	(Uruguay) Pascual Somma
FW	(Uruguay) Ángel Romano
FW	(Uruguay) Santos Urdinarán
FW	(Uruguay) Héctor Scarone
FW	(Uruguay) Rodolfo Marán

Notes

Injured players; substitutions were not allowed in those times so both teams ended with 10 players each
