= Cesáreo Onzari =

Argentine footballer

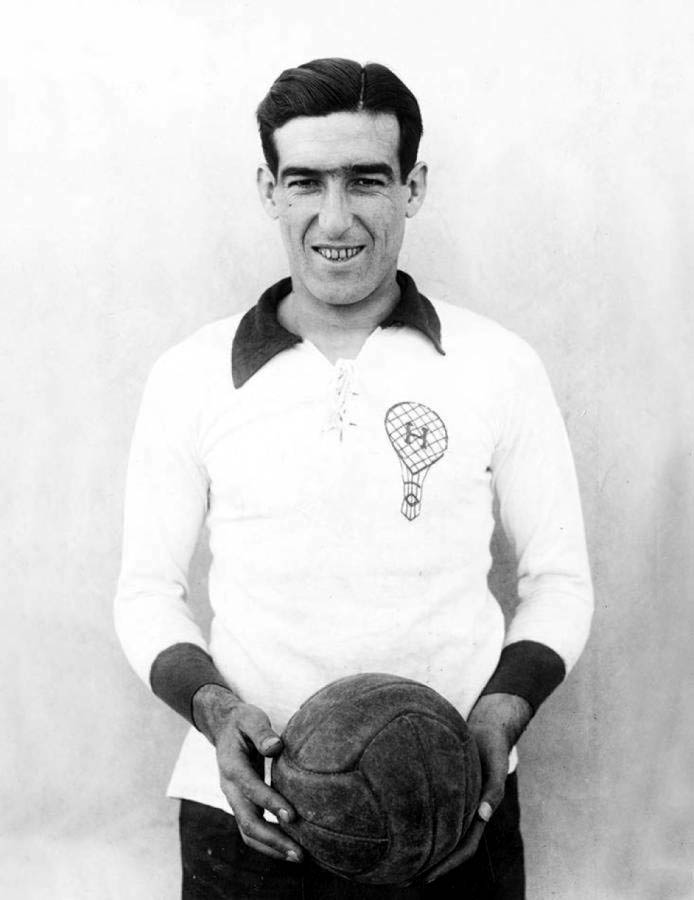
- Onzari with Huracán, where he played his entire career

Personal information
- Full name: Cesáreo Juan Onzari
- Date of birth: February 1, 1903
- Place of birth: Buenos Aires, Argentina
- Date of death: January 7, 1964 (aged 60)
- Place of death: Buenos Aires, Argentina
- Position: Left winger

Senior career*
Years	Team	Apps	(Gls)
1921–1933	Huracán	47	(7)
Total		212	(67)

International career
1922–1924	Argentina	15	(5)
- * Club domestic league appearances and goals

Cesáreo Onzari (February 1, 1903 – January 7, 1964) was an Argentine footballer who played as a left winger. He made his entire career in Huracán, playing from 1921 until his retirement in 1933. He was the first footballer known to have scored directly on a corner kick without an assist in professional play.

== Biography ==
Onzari started his career playing for clubs Sportivo Boedo and Mitre. In 1921 he made his debut at Huracán, where he played as a left winger.

Although Onzari made a successful career in football, his peak of popularity was on October 2, 1924, during a friendly match between Argentina and Uruguay national teams, played at Estadio Sportivo Barracas.

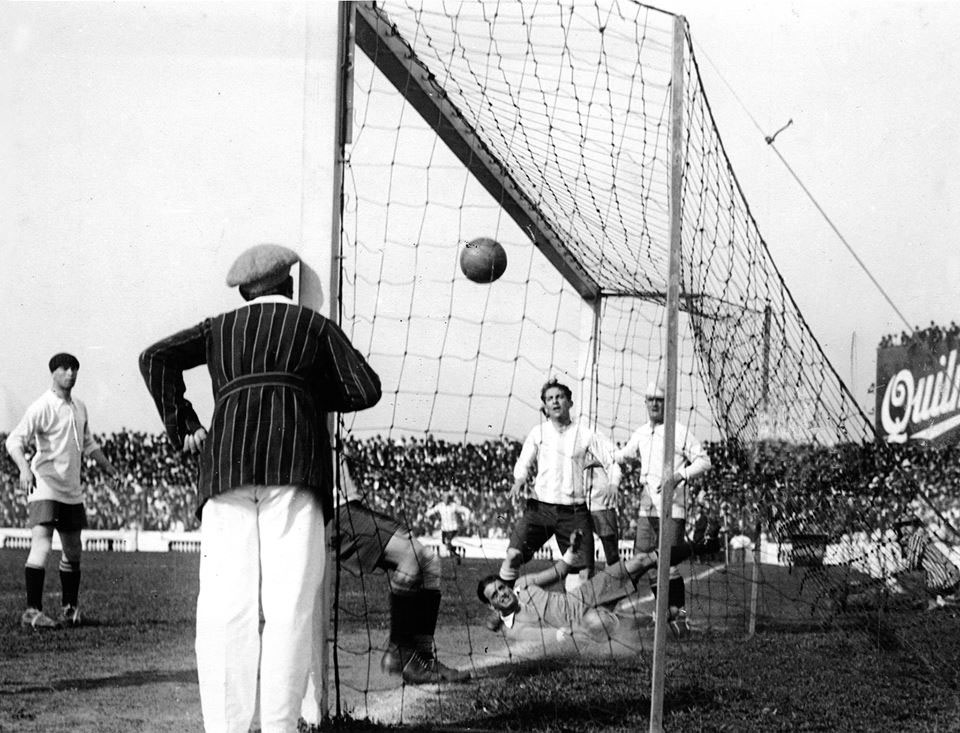
Onzari's olympic goal against Uruguay in 1924.

In the 15th minute, Onzari made a goal from a corner kick, with no other player touching the ball before scoring. Due to the fact that Uruguay were the Olympic champions, this play was called "Gol Olímpico". This denomination still remains.

That goal was conceded to Argentina because FIFA had previously regulated goals scored directly from the corner kick, as Onzari did during that match. According to La Nación newspaper, 52.000 fans attended the match, which was won by Argentina 2-1 although the Uruguayan team left the field with only 4 minutes to play. Argentine players later complained about the toughness of the Uruguayan team during the match, while their rivals also complained about the aggressiveness of local spectators, who threw bottles at them at the end of the match.

Onzari played for Argentina national team between 1922 and 1924 a total of 15 matches, scoring 5 goals. He also disputed the 1924 and 1925 Campeonato Sudamericanos with Argentina, winning the title in 1925. That same year Onzari played for Boca Juniors during the tour that Xeneizes made in Europe.

He retired from football in 1933, two years after this sport became professional in Argentina. Onzari died on January 6, 1964. He totalized 212 matches, scoring 67 goals with Huracán.

== Title ==
=== Club ===
Huracán

- Primera División (4): 1921, 1922, 1925, 1928

=== International ===
Argentina national team

- Campeonato Sudamericano (1): 1925
