= Juan Betinotti =

Argentine footballer

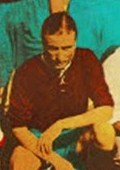

Personal information
- Full name: Juan Ernesto Betinotti
- Date of birth: 1900
- Place of birth: Buenos Aires, Argentina
- Date of death: ?
- Position: Forward

Senior career*
Years	Team	Apps	(Gls)
(1920s– 1931) – (1935–1937)	Estudiantil Porteno		
- * Club domestic league appearances and goals

Juan Betinotti was an Argentine footballer, who played as forward in the Club Atlético Independiente, and Estudiantil Porteño, team where he played an international friendly against Chelsea F.C in 1929.

== Career ==
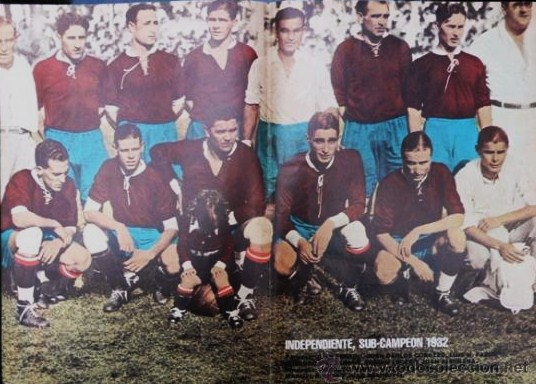
Independiente 1932 runner-up

Betinotti was born in Buenos Aires, son of a family of Italian immigrants. He began his career in Estudiantil Porteño, being later incorporated into the Club Atlético Independiente, playing the final against River Plate in 1932.

Juan Betinotti also played for the Club Atlético Vélez Sarsfield. In 1935 he returns to Estudiantil Porteño, club where he finished his career in 1937.
