= Emilio Almiñana =

Uruguayan footballer

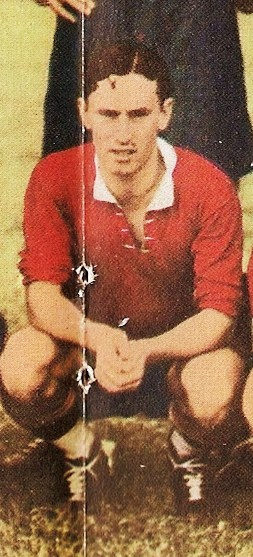

Personal information
- Place of birth: Montevideo, Uruguay
- Position: Midfielder

Youth career
- Central Español

Senior career*
Years	Team	Apps	(Gls)
1932–1933	Club Atlético Independiente		
- * Club domestic league appearances and goals

Emilio Almiñana was an Uruguayan footballer, he played as midfielder in Club Atlético Independiente.

== Career ==
Almiñana was born in Montevideo, city where began his football career, playing for Central Español. In 1932 he played in the Independiente team that lost the final against River Plate by 3–0. Almiñana played 37 games between 1932 and 1933.
