= 1957 Copa Aldao =

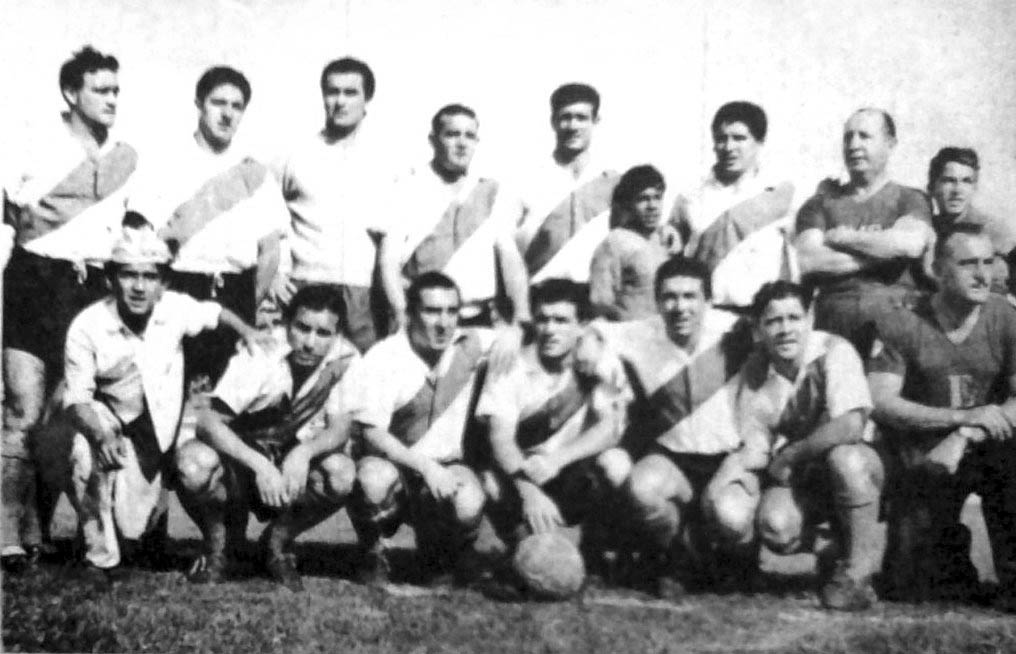
- The River Plate team that won the first leg
- Event: Copa Aldao
Nacional	River Plate
(Uruguay)	(Argentina)
- Second leg never played, no title awarded

First leg
Nacional	River Plate
1	2
- Date: April 11, 1959
- Venue: Estadio Centenario

Second leg
River Plate	Nacional
–	–

The 1957 Copa Aldao was the final match to decide the winner of the Copa Aldao, the 18th edition of the international competition organised by the Argentine and Uruguayan Associations together. The final (held ten years after than its previous edition) was contested by Uruguayan club Nacional and Argentine side River Plate.

In the first match, played at Estadio Centenario in Montevideo, River Plate won 2–1 but the second leg, to be held in Buenos Aires, was never played. As the associations did not decide about the issue, no title was awarded.

== Qualified teams ==
Team	Qualification	Previous final app.
(Argentina) River Plate	1957 Primera División champions	5 (**1936, 1937, 1941, 1945, 1947**)
(Uruguay) Nacional	1957 Primera División champions	9 (**1916**, 1917, **1919, 1920**, 1939, 1940, 1941, 1942, 1947)

- **Bold** indicates winning years

== Venue ==
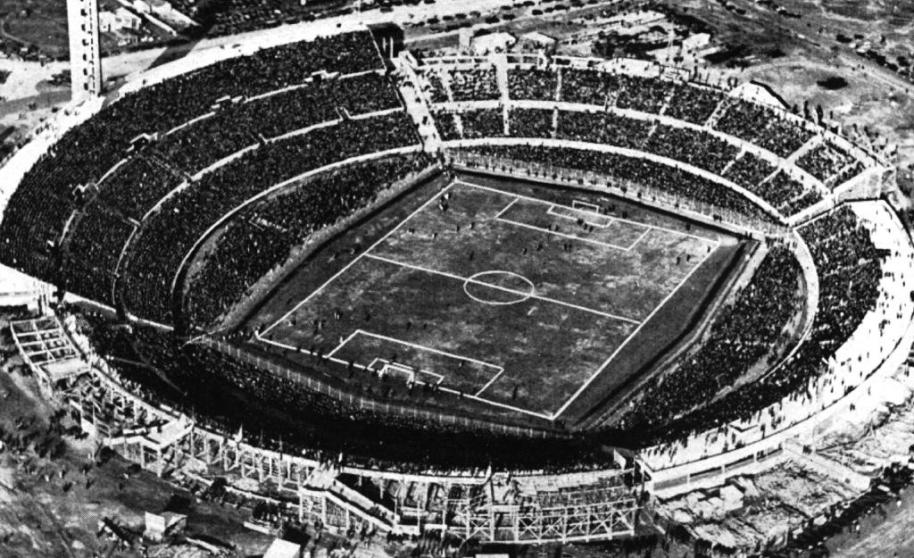
Estadio Centenario, venue for the first leg. The match in Buenos Aires was never held, with no title awarded

== Match details ==
=== First leg ===
1957 Copa Aldao
April 11, 1959
First leg

Nacional (Uruguay)	1–2	(Argentina) River Plate
Salva 43'	Report	Urriolabeytía 2'; De Bourgoing 70'

Estadio Centenario, Montevideo

**Nacional**	**River Plate**

GK	(Uruguay) Roberto E. Sosa
DF	(Uruguay) Horacio Troche
DF	(Uruguay) K. Bagdasarián
MF	(Uruguay) Salaberriborda
MF	(Uruguay) Rubén González
MF	(Uruguay) Eduardo Grolla
FW	(Uruguay) Héctor Salva
FW	(Uruguay) Rogelio Núñez
FW	(Uruguay) Paola
FW	(Uruguay) Héctor Núñez
FW	(Uruguay) Juan A. Romero Isasi
Manager:
(Uruguay) Ondino Viera

GK	(Argentina) Amadeo Carrizo
DF	(Argentina) Alfredo Pérez
DF	(Argentina) Federico Vairo
MF	(Argentina) Juan C. Malazzo
MF	(Argentina) Juan E. Urriolabeitía
MF	(Argentina) Juan C. Schneider
FW	(Argentina) Héctor De Bourgoing
FW	(Argentina) Norberto Menéndez
FW	(Argentina) Ermindo Onega
FW	(Argentina) Ángel Labruna
FW	(Argentina) Roberto Zárate
Manager:
(Argentina) José María Minella

=== Second leg ===
Second leg

River Plate (Argentina)	(not played)	(Uruguay) Nacional
	Report

–, Buenos Aires

As the second leg was never held, no champion was proclaimed.
