= 1942 Copa Aldao =

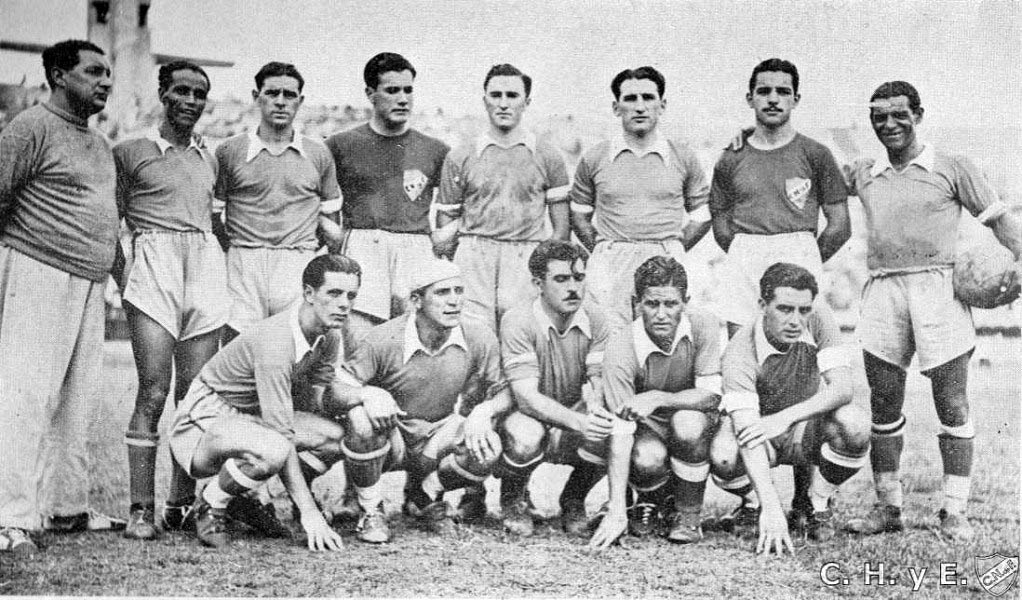
- Nacional, first leg winners
- Event: Copa Aldao
Nacional	River Plate
(Uruguay)	(Argentina)
- (second leg never played, no title awarded)

First leg
Nacional	River Plate
4	0
- Second leg never played, no title awarded
- Date: December 8, 1942
- Venue: Estadio Centenario
- Referee: Aníbal Tejada (Uruguay)

Second leg
River Plate	Nacional
-	-

The 1942 Copa Aldao was the final match to decide the winner of the Copa Aldao, the 15th edition of the international competition organised by the Argentine and Uruguayan Associations together. The final was contested by Uruguayan club Nacional and Argentine side River Plate.

In the first match, played at Estadio Centenario in Montevideo, National beat River Plate with a conclusive 4–0 win. The second leg should have been played at San Lorenzo de Almagro Stadium in Buenos Aires, but it was never held therefore the title was not officially awarded to any team.

== Qualified teams ==
Team	Qualification	Previous final app.
(Uruguay) Nacional	1942 Primera División champions	7 (**1916**, 1917, **1919, 1920**, 1939, 1940, 1941)
(Argentina) River Plate	1942 Primera División champions	3 (**1936, 1937, 1941**)

- **Bold** indicates winning years

== Venue ==
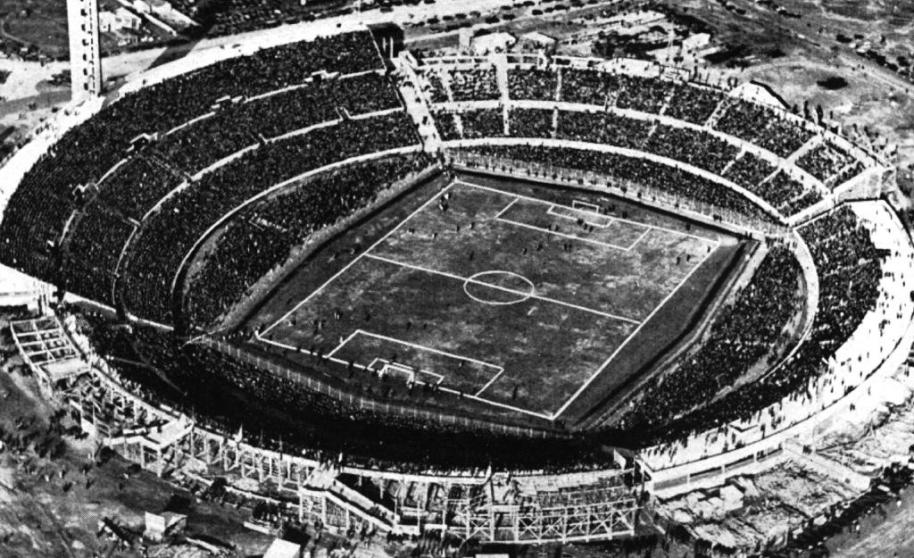
Estadio Centenario, venue for the first leg. The match in Buenos Aires was never played and no title was awarded

== Match details ==
=== First leg ===
1942 Copa Aldao
December 8, 1942
First leg

Nacional (Uruguay)	4–0	(Argentina) River Plate
Ballesteros 22'; Castro 31'; Porta 38', 55'	Report

Estadio Centenario, Montevideo
Referee: Aníbal Tejada (Uruguay)

**Nacional**	**River Plate**

GK	(Uruguay) Aníbal Paz
DF	(Uruguay) Luis Fazio
DF	(Uruguay) Dándalo Rodríguez Candales
MF	(Uruguay) Luis Pérez Luz
MF	(Uruguay) Eugenio Galvalisi
MF	(Uruguay) General Viana
FW	(Uruguay) Luis E. Castro
FW	(Uruguay) Roberto Porta
FW	(Argentina) Atilio García
FW	(Uruguay) Gabino Ballesteros
FW	(Uruguay) Bibiano Zapirain
Manager:
(Uruguay) Héctor Castro

GK	(Argentina) Julio Barrios
DF	(Argentina) Ricardo Vaghi
DF	(Argentina) Luis A. Ferreyra
MF	(Argentina) Norberto Yácono
MF	(Argentina) Bruno Rodolfi
MF	(Argentina) José Ramos
FW	(Argentina) Aristóbulo Deambrossi
FW	(Argentina) José M. Moreno
FW	(Argentina) Adolfo Pedernera
FW	(Argentina) Ángel Labruna
FW	(Argentina) Félix Loustau
Manager:
(Italy) (Argentina) Renato Cesarini

=== Second leg ===
–
Second leg

River Plate (Argentina)	(not played)	(Uruguay) Nacional

San Lorenzo, Buenos Aires

As the second leg was not held, no champion was proclaimed.
