= 1947 Copa Aldao =

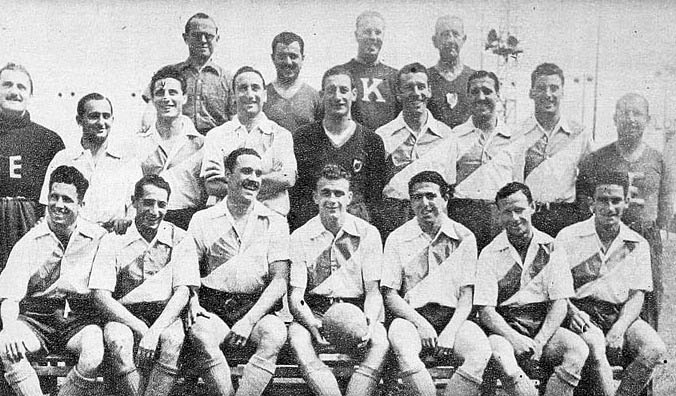
- A River Plate team of 1947
- Event: Copa Aldao
Nacional	River Plate
(Uruguay)	(Argentina)
- River Plate won 4–0 on points

First leg
Nacional	River Plate
3	4
- Date: November 19, 1947
- Venue: Estadio Centenario, Montevideo
- Referee: Luis A. Fernández (Uruguay)

Second leg
River Plate	Nacional
3	1
- Date: November 22, 1947
- Venue: San Lorenzo, Buenos Aires
- Referee: Leopoldo Amoroso (Argentina)

The 1947 Copa Aldao was the final match to decide the winner of the Copa Aldao, the 17th edition of the international competition organised by the Argentine and Uruguayan Associations together. The final was contested by Uruguayan club Nacional and Argentine side River Plate.

In the first match, played at played at Estadio Centenario in Montevideo, River Plate won 4–3 while in the second leg, held in San Lorenzo de Almagro Stadium, River beat Nacional again 3–1. Thus, River Plate won the series and set a record of five Copa Aldao won over six editions contested.

== Qualified teams ==
Team	Qualification	Previous final app.
(Argentina) River Plate	1947 Primera División champions	4 (**1936, 1937, 1941, 1945**)
(Uruguay) Nacional	1947 Primera División champions	8 (**1916**, 1917, **1919, 1920**, 1939, 1940, 1941, 1942)

- **Bold** indicates winning years

== Venues ==
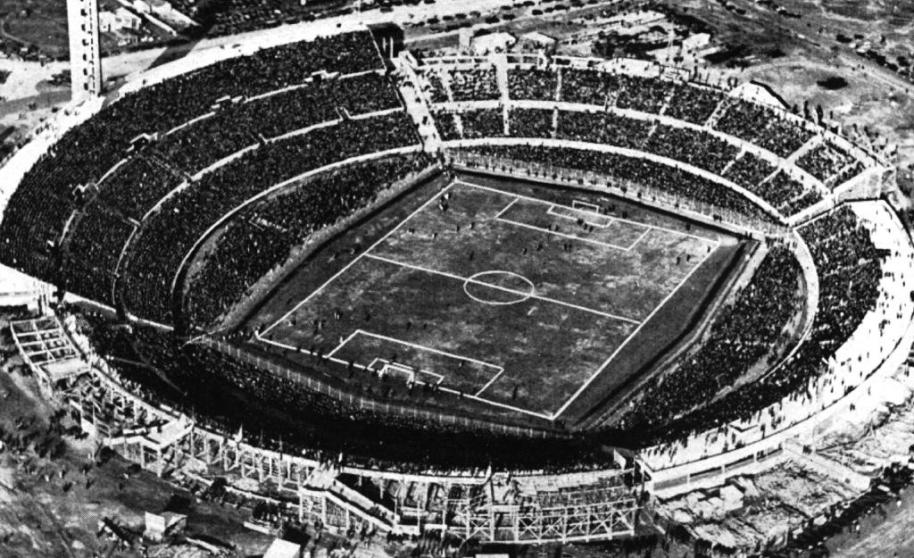
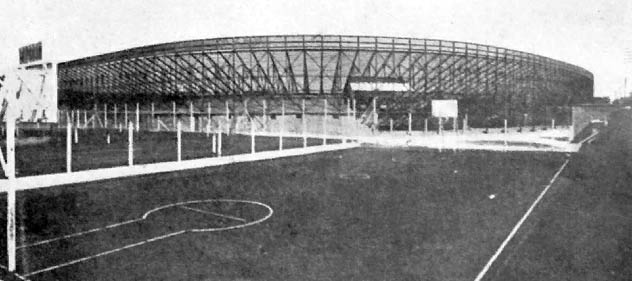
Centenario (left) and San Lorenzo de Almagro Stadiums, venues for the series

== Match details ==
=== First leg ===
1947 Copa Aldao
November 19, 1947
First leg

Nacional (Uruguay)	3–4	(Argentina) River Plate
J.García 24'; W. Gómez 49', 79'	Report	Labruna 29', 62', 67'; Di Stéfano 61'

Estadio Centenario, Montevideo
Referee: Luis A. Fernández (Uruguay)

**Nacional**	**River Plate**

GK	(Uruguay) Aníbal Paz
DF	(Uruguay) Raúl Pini
DF	(Uruguay) Eusebio Tejera
MF	(Uruguay) J.C. Taibo
MF	(Uruguay) Rodolfo Pini
MF	(Uruguay) Schubert Gambetta
FW	(Uruguay) Luis Castro
FW	(Uruguay) Walter Gómez
FW	(Argentina) Atilio García
FW	(Uruguay) José García
FW	(Argentina) Victorio Panasci
Manager:
(Uruguay) Ricardo Faccio

GK	(Argentina) Héctor Grisetti
DF	(Argentina) Ricardo Vaghi
DF	(Argentina) Luis A. Ferreyra
MF	(Argentina) Norberto Yácono
MF	(Argentina) Bruno Rodolfi
MF	(Argentina) José Ramos
FW	(Argentina) Hugo Reyes
FW	(Argentina) José M. Moreno
FW	(Argentina) Alfredo Di Stéfano
FW	(Argentina) Ángel Labruna
FW	(Argentina) Félix Loustau
Manager:
(Argentina) José María Minella

=== Second leg ===
November 22, 1947
Second leg

River Plate (Argentina)	3–1	(Uruguay) Nacional
Reyes 6', 68', 88'	Report	W. Gómez 44'

San Lorenzo de Almagro, Buenos Aires
Attendance: 70,000
Referee: Leopoldo Amoroso (Argentina)

**River Plate**	**Nacional**

GK	(Argentina) Héctor Grisetti
DF	(Argentina) Ricardo Vaghi
DF	(Argentina) Avelino Cadilla
MF	(Argentina) Norberto Yácono
MF	(Argentina) Néstor Rossi
MF	(Argentina) José Ramos
FW	(Argentina) Hugo Reyes
FW	(Argentina) José M. Moreno
FW	(Argentina) Alfredo Di Stéfano
FW	(Argentina) Ángel Labruna
FW	(Argentina) Félix Loustau
Manager:
(Argentina) José María Minella

GK	(Uruguay) A. Peñalva
DF	(Uruguay) Raúl Pini
DF	(Uruguay) Eusebio Tejera
MF	(Uruguay) J.C. Taibo
MF	(Uruguay) Rodolfo Pini
MF	(Uruguay) Schubert Gambetta
FW	(Uruguay) Luis Castro
FW	(Uruguay) Walter Gómez
FW	(Uruguay) J. Walter
FW	(Uruguay) José García
FW	(Argentina) Victorio Panasci
Manager:
(Uruguay) Ricardo Faccio
