= Amadeo Carrizo =

Argentine footballer (1926–2020)

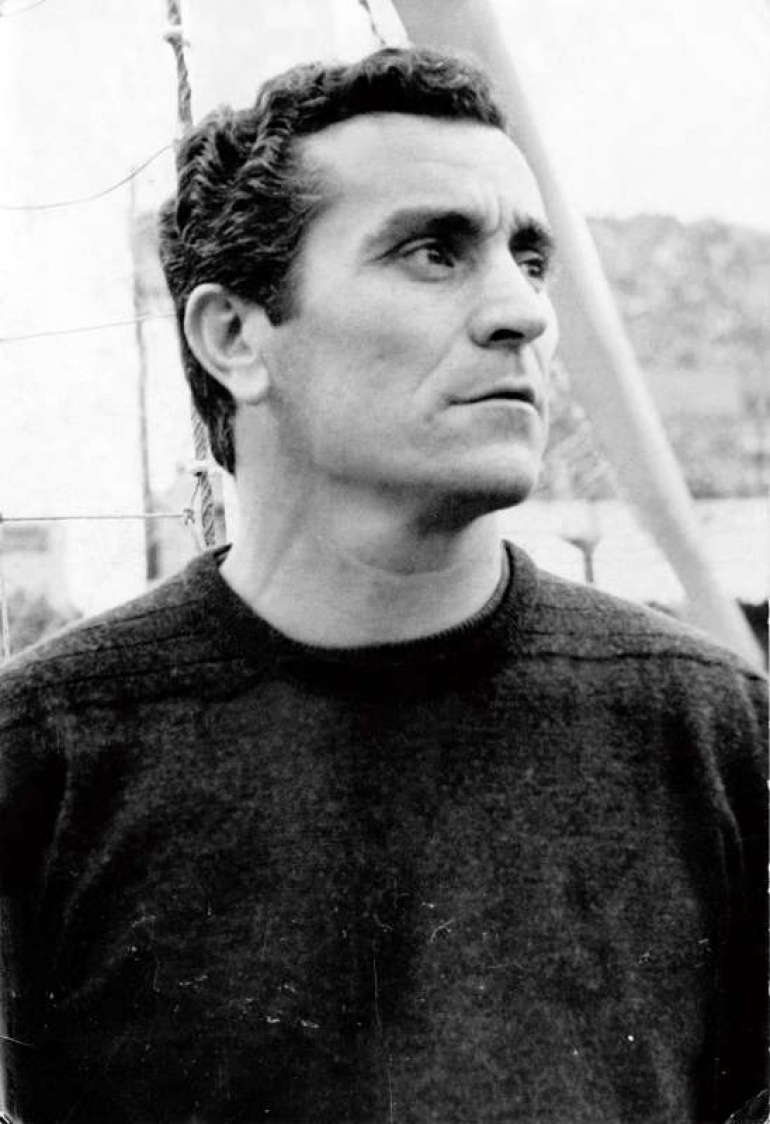

Personal information
- Full name: Amadeo Raúl Carrizo Larretape
- Date of birth: 12 June 1926
- Place of birth: Rufino, Argentina
- Date of death: 20 March 2020 (aged 93)
- Place of death: Buenos Aires, Argentina
- Height: 1.88 m (6 ft 2 in)
- Position: Goalkeeper

Senior career*
Years	Team	Apps	(Gls)
1945–1968	River Plate	521	(0)
1969	Alianza Lima	1	(0)
1969	Club Universitario de Deportes	1	(0)
1969–1970	Millonarios	53	(0)
Total		576	(0)

International career
1954–1964	Argentina	20	(0)

Managerial career
- 1973: Deportivo Armenio
- 1973: Once Caldas
- * Club domestic league appearances and goals

Amadeo Raúl Carrizo Larretape (12 June 1926 – 20 March 2020), popularly known by his first name "Amadeo", was an Argentine football goalkeeper and manager. Carrizo is considered a pioneer of the position, helping to innovate techniques and strategies for goalkeepers. The IFFHS ranked Carrizo as the best South American keeper of the 20th century in 1999.

He was the first goalkeeper in Argentina to wear gloves, following an example by Italy's Giovanni Viola. He was also the first one to regularly leave the penalty area to defend his goal and the first one to use goal kicks as a strategy to start counterattacks. His way of playing has inspired many famous South American keepers, most notably Hugo Orlando Gatti, René Higuita, and José Luis Chilavert. Germany's Manuel Neuer is a more recent exponent of this style.

== Club career ==
=== River Plate ===
Carrizo made his debut in the Argentine First Division on 6 May 1945, playing for River Plate. The match was against Independiente, River Plate won 2–1.

During his time at River Plate, he played alongside stars such as José Manuel Moreno, Félix Loustau, Adolfo Pedernera, Ángel Labruna, and the young Alfredo Di Stéfano. He won seven national Championship trophies in 1945, 1947, 1952, 1953, 1955, 1956, and 1957. With River, he also won the Copa Aldao of 1945 and 1947 and the Copa Ibarguren of 1952, and reached the 1966 Copa Libertadores Finals, losing out after three matches against CA Peñarol of Uruguay.

On 30 March 1967, Carrizo made his 500th appearance for River Plate in a Metropolitano championship match against San Lorenzo at the Estadio Gasómetro. In a league match against Atlético Vélez on 14 July 1968, the 42-year-old Carrizo simultaneously established two records for his time: most official matches for River Plate in the Argentine First Division (521) and longest run without conceding a single goal at 769 minutes, surpassing Antonio Roma's national record (741). This treak came to end in this very match, courtesy of a header from an 18-year-old Carlos Bianchi. He played his last match in the Argentine top-flight in 1968, becoming, at the age of 42 years and 7 months, one of the oldest players in the competition's history, currently sitting in fourth, only behind fellow goalkeepers Pedro Catalano (42 years and 10 months), Edgardo Andrada (43), and Hugo Gatti (44).

=== Millonarios and retirement ===
In 1969, Carrizo reinforced two Peruvian teams in one match for each: Alianza Lima against Lev Yashin's Dynamo Moscow and Club Universitario de Deportes against SC Corinthians Paulista from Brazil. In April 1969, Carrizo joined the Colombian team Millonarios, where he ended his career in April 1970. His sometimes acrobatic saves earned him the moniker Tarzan from the local audience.

== International career ==
Carrizo played for the Argentina national football team with significant success, especially against Brazil, but he also suffered a 6–1 defeat against Czechoslovakia, in the 1958 FIFA World Cup. In 1964 he won with Argentina the Taça das Nações, a tournament held in Brazil, featuring also England and Portugal, to celebrate the 50th anniversary of the Brazilian Football Confederation.

== Managerial career ==
In 1973, Carrizo managed Deportivo Armenio, a club from the Province of Buenos Aires and led the team to promotion to the league Primera C. In 1973 he returned to Colombia, to manage first division team Once Caldas, from Manizales, then known as Cristal Caldas.

== Honours ==
River Plate

- Primera División: 1945, 1947, 1952, 1953, 1955, 1956, 1957
- Copa Aldao: 1945, 1947, 1957
- Copa Ibarguren: 1952
- Copa Libertadores runner-up: 1966

Argentina

- Taça das Nações: 1964

=== Individual ===
- IFFHS South America Men's Team of All Time: 2021
- IFFHS Argentina All Times Dream Team: 2021
