= La Máquina =

River Plate football team (1941–1947)

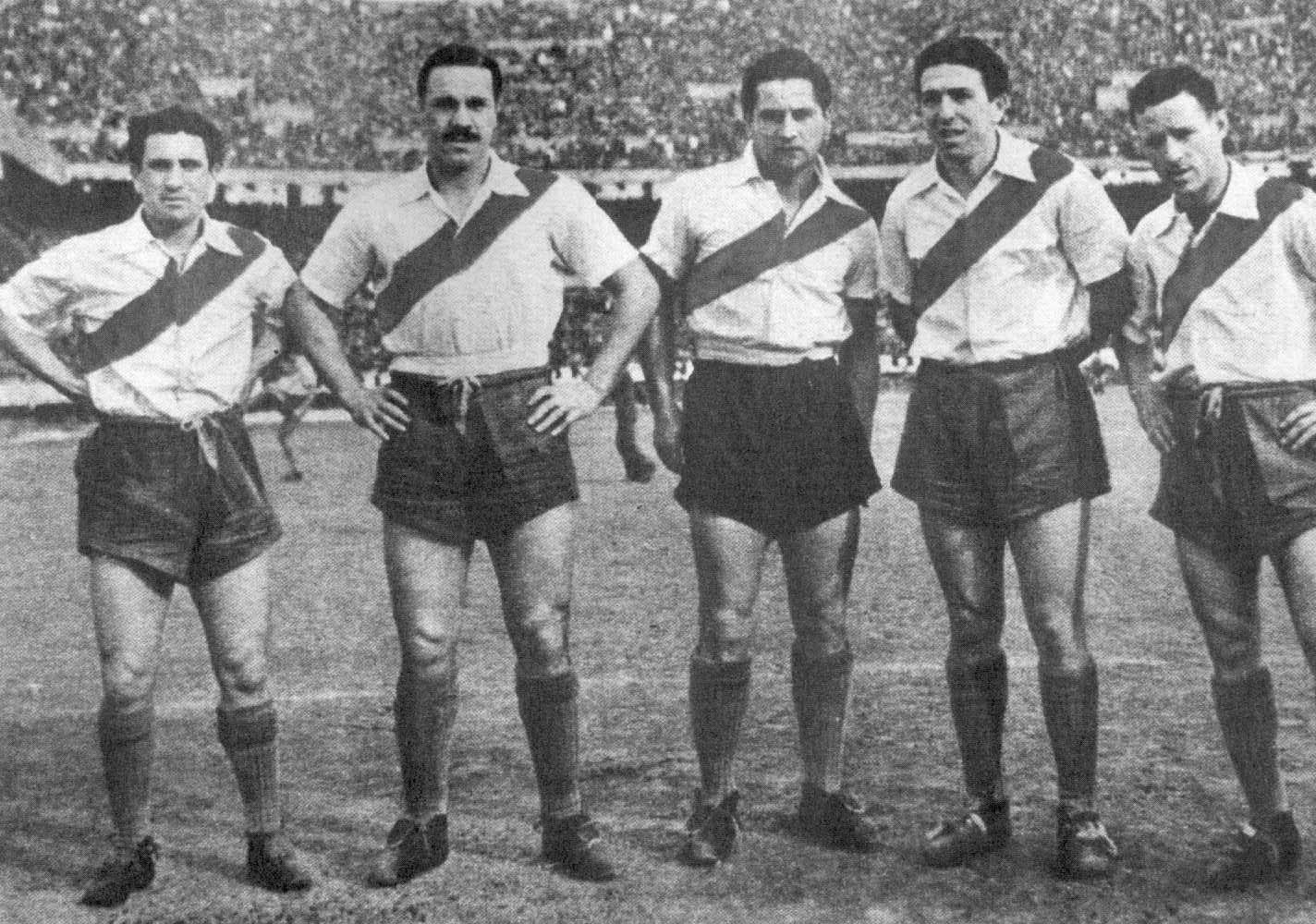
La Máquina in its most famous incarnation, l–r: Muñoz, Moreno, Pedernera, Labruna, and Loustau, 1941

La Máquina (English: the Machine) is a nickname given to the River Plate football team from 1941 to 1947, commonly referred by the media as the best Argentine team of its era and one of the best teams worldwide.

The core group of la Máquina were forwards Juan Carlos Muñoz, José Manuel Moreno, Adolfo Pedernera, Ángel Labruna, and Félix Loustau. Other players that were part of the attacking line were Aristóbulo Deambrossi, Carlos Peucelle, Alberto Gallo, and Renato Cesarini. In La Máquina also debuted Alfredo Di Stéfano and goalkeeper Amadeo Carrizo.

Due to its style of play, "The Machine" is often cataloged as a pioneer in the practice of the so-called Total Football, and the South American predecessor of the Hungarian national teams of the 50's, and the Clockwork Orange Netherlands national team of the 1970s. The team won a total of 10 titles, including four Primera División and three Copa Aldao, among other titles.

== History ==
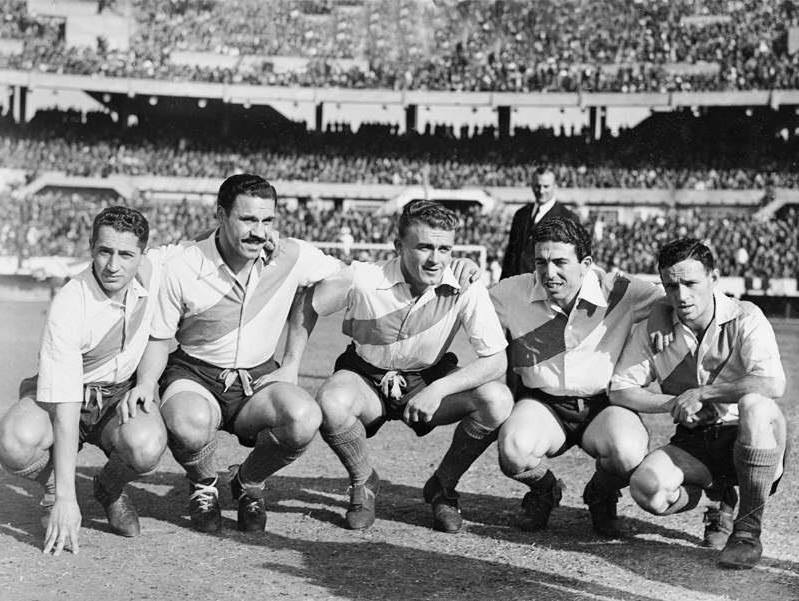
La Máquina in 1947: from left to right: Reyes, Moreno, Di Stéfano, Labruna and Loustau

The nickname was given to them by Borocotó, a Uruguayan sports journalist working for El Gráfico, after River Plate defeated Chacarita Juniors 6–2 on 12 June 1942. Borocotó used that adjective to illustrate the performance of the forward line on the field.

For their dynamism and rotating positions, La Máquina is often considered a precursor of the famous Clockwork Orange as it was nicknamed the Netherlands national football team that played the 1974 FIFA World Cup. In 1941, River Plate's La Máquina coaches, Renato Cesarini and Carlos Peucelle, started using the left winger Adolfo Pedernera as a man of reference "switching him to a more central and withdrawn role and inviting him to alternate between driving into the box to finish moves off and sitting back to direct them". It was one of the first uses of the figure of the false nine. When Pedernera transferred to Atlanta, a young Alfredo Di Stéfano took his place.

The first time they played together was on June 28, 1942, in Estadio Monumental v. Platense. River Plate won by 1-0, with Félix Loustau replacing Aristóbulo Deambrossi as left winger.

From 1943 to 1946 the team achieved two championships and finished as runner-up twice. Other players that took part of La Máquina were Aristóbulo Deambrossi, Carlos Peucelle, Alberto Gallo and Renato Cesarini.

== Honours ==
=== National ===
- Primera División (4): 1941, 1942, 1945, 1947
- Copa Ibarguren (2): 1941, 1942
- Copa Adrián Escobar (1): 1941

=== International ===
- Copa Aldao (3): 1941, 1945, 1947
