= Juan Carlos Muñoz (footballer, born 1919) =

Argentine footballer and manager

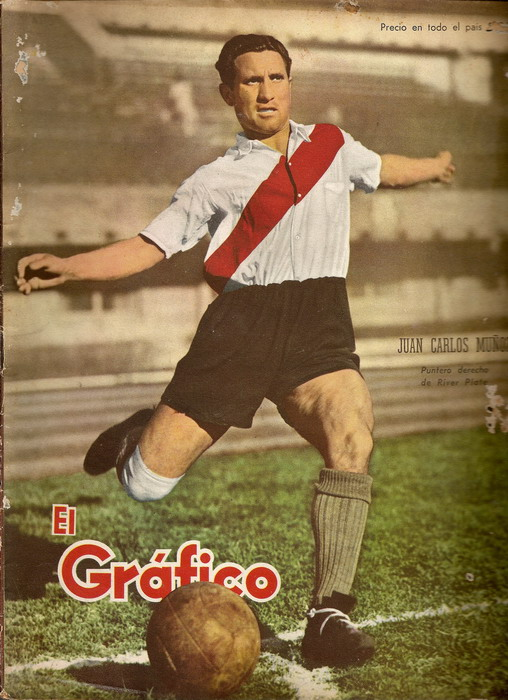
- Muñoz in 1945

Personal information
- Date of birth: 4 March 1919
- Place of birth: Avellaneda, Argentina
- Date of death: 22 November 2009 (aged 90)
- Place of death: Buenos Aires, Argentina
- Position: Right winger

Senior career*
Years	Team	Apps	(Gls)
1938–1939	Dock Sud		
1939–1950	River Plate	184	(39)
1951–1953	Platense	39	(3)

International career
1945	Argentina	11	(2)
- * Club domestic league appearances and goals as of October 2008

Juan Carlos Muñoz (4 March 1919 – 22 November 2009) was a footballer from Argentina who played as a right winger for River Plate, from 1939 to 1950, playing 184 games and scoring 39 goals. He started playing professionally for Sportivo Dock Sud in 1938. and he was sold in June 1939 to River Plate. He was part of the team known as La Máquina ("the machine") which dominated Argentine football in the 1940s, and was also a member of the Argentina national team that won three South American Championships during the same decade. During his time at River Plate he won 4 titles and is considered one of their greatest ever players. After a very successful time at River Plate He moved to Platense, from 1951 to 1953, where he played in 39 games making 3 goals.

Muñoz played 11 times for the Argentina national team scoring two goals, he was part of the squad that won Copa América 1945. He never played in the FIFA World Cup because the best part of his career coincided with the Second World War.

After retiring as a player Muñoz went on to become the manager and then president of Club Atlético Platense.

== Death ==
On 22 November 2009, Muñoz died in Buenos Aires due to a heart attack.

== Honours ==
=== Club ===
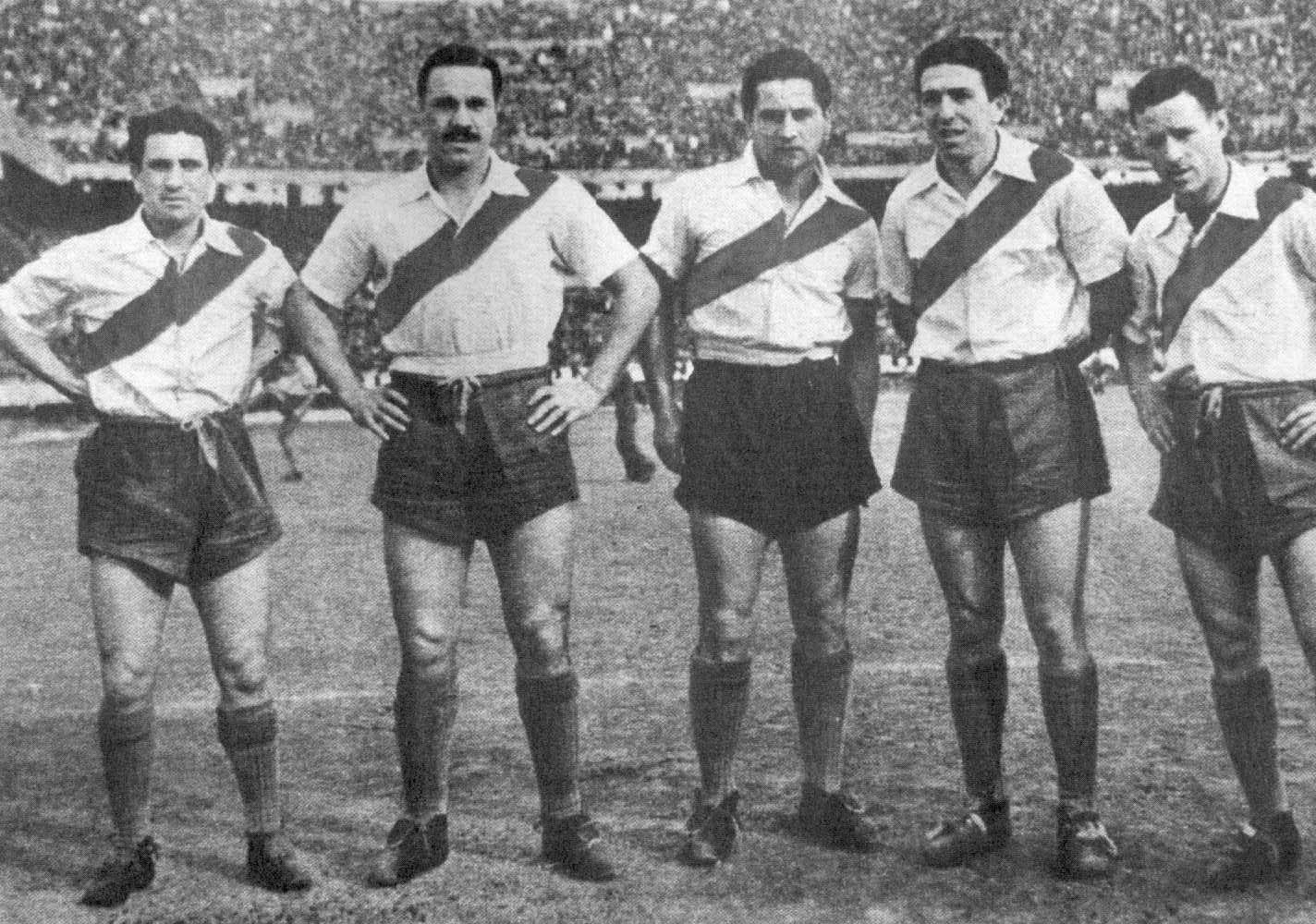
La Máquina: Muñoz, Moreno, Pedernera, Labruna and Loustau in 1941.

River Plate

- Primera División Argentina: 1941, 1942, 1945, 1947
- Copa Ibarguren: 1941, 1942
- Copa Adrián C. Escobar: 1941
- Copa Aldao: 1941, 1945, 1947

=== International ===
Argentina

- Copa América: 1945
