= 1945 Copa Aldao =

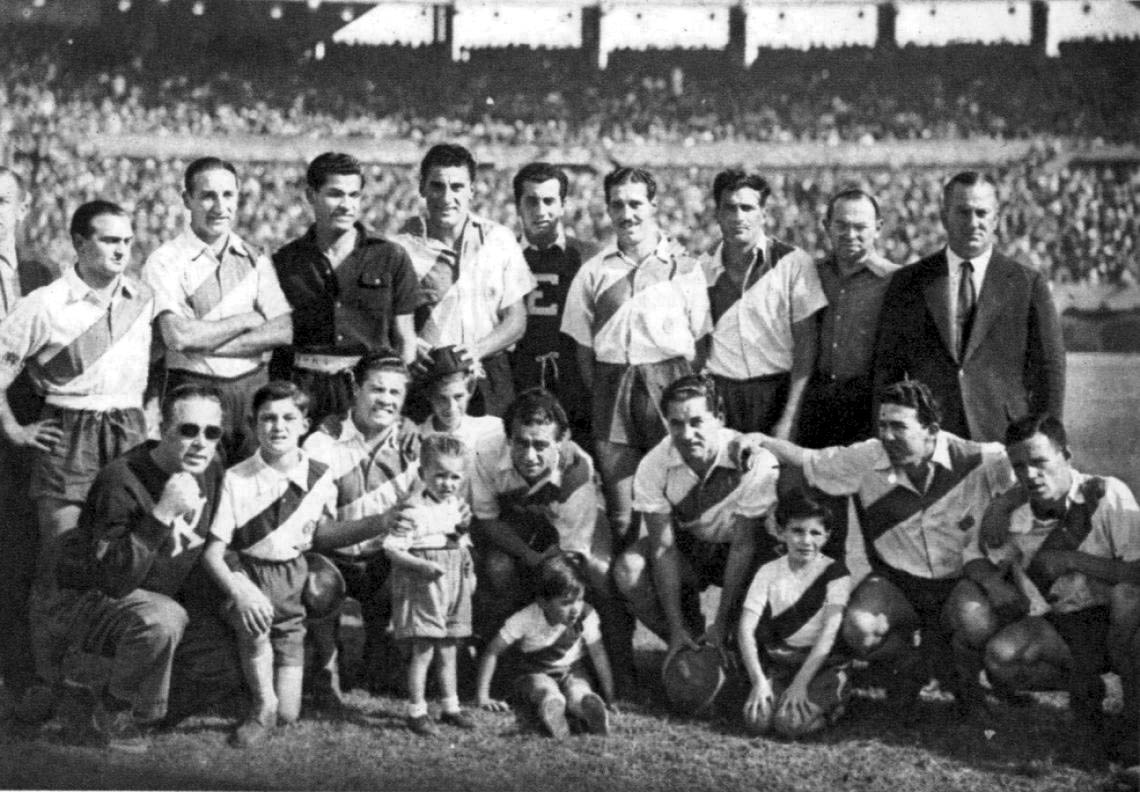
- A River Plate team of 1945
- Event: Copa Aldao
Peñarol	River Plate
(Uruguay)	(Argentina)
- River Plate won 4–0 on points

First leg
Peñarol	River Plate
1	2
- Date: 6 December 1945
- Venue: Estadio Centenario
- Referee: Nobel Valentini (Uruguay)

Second leg
River Plate	Peñarol
3	2
- Date: 11 December 1945
- Venue: Estadio de San Lorenzo, Buenos Aires
- Referee: Eduardo Forte (Argentina)

The 1945 Copa Aldao was the final match to decide the winner of the Copa Aldao, the 16th edition of the international competition organised by the Argentine and Uruguayan Associations together. The final was contested by Uruguayan club Peñarol and Argentine side River Plate.

In the first match, played at Estadio Centenario in Montevideo, River Plate beat Peñarol 2–1 while in the second leg held in San Lorenzo de Almagro Stadium in Buenos Aires, River Plate beat again Peñarol 3–2 therefore achieving its fourth Copa Aldao trophy in five finals contested. Besides, striker Ángel Labruna was the most notable player of River Plate, having scored all goals for the team (5) in both matches.

== Qualified teams ==
Team	Qualification	Previous final app.
(Argentina) River Plate	1945 Primera División champions	4 (**1936, 1937, 1941**, 1942)
(Uruguay) Peñarol	1945 Primera División champions	5 ( 1918, **1928**, 1936, 1937, 1938)

- **Bold** indicates winning years

== Venues ==
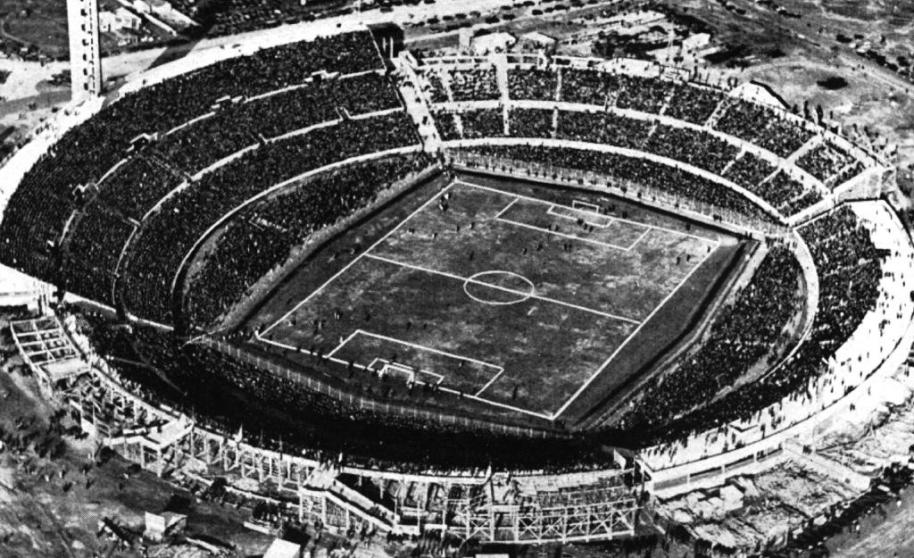
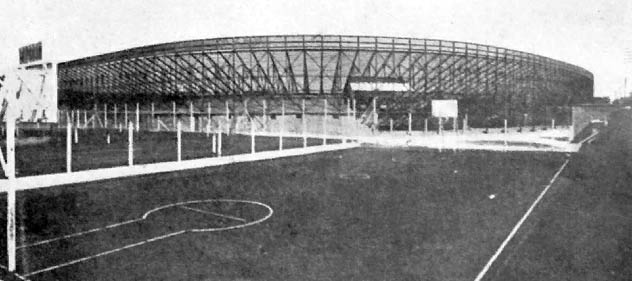
Estadio Centenario (left) and San Lorenzo de Almagro, venues for the series

== Match details ==
=== First leg ===
1945 Copa Aldao
December 6, 1945
First leg

Peñarol (Uruguay)	1–2	(Argentina) River Plate
Chirimini 52'	Report	Labruna 28', 58'

Estadio Centenario, Montevideo
Referee: Nobel Valentini (Uruguay)

**Peñarol**	**River Plate**

GK	(Uruguay) Roque Máspoli
DF	(Uruguay) Agustín Prado
DF	(Italy) Sixto Possamay
MF	(Uruguay) José Pedro Colturi
MF	(Uruguay) Obdulio Varela
MF	(Uruguay) Luis Prais
FW	(Uruguay) Juan Manuel Ortiz
FW	(Uruguay) Francisco Martiarena
FW	(Uruguay) Raúl Schiaffino
FW	(Uruguay) Óscar Chirimini
FW	(Italy) Ernesto Vidal
Manager:
(Uruguay) Alberto Supicci

GK	(Argentina) Amadeo Carrizo
DF	(Argentina) Ricardo Vaghi
DF	(Argentina) Eduardo Rodríguez
MF	(Argentina) Norberto Yácono
MF	(Argentina) Néstor Rossi
MF	(Argentina) José Ramos
FW	(Argentina) Juan Carlos Muñoz
FW	(Argentina) Alberto Gallo
FW	(Argentina) Adolfo Pedernera
FW	(Argentina) Ángel Labruna
FW	(Argentina) Félix Loustau
Manager:
(Argentina) Carlos Peucelle

=== Second leg ===
December 11, 1945
Second leg

River Plate (Argentina)	3–2	(Uruguay) Peñarol
Labruna 35', 40', 71'	Report	Vidal 21'; Schiaffino 84'

Estadio de San Lorenzo, Buenos Aires
Referee: Eduardo Forte (Argentina)

**River Plate**	**Peñarol**

GK	(Argentina) Amadeo Carrizo
DF	(Argentina) Ricardo Vaghi
DF	(Argentina) Eduardo Rodríguez
MF	(Argentina) Norberto Yácono
MF	(Argentina) Néstor Rossi
MF	(Argentina) José Ramos
FW	(Argentina) Juan Carlos Muñoz
FW	(Argentina) Alberto Gallo
FW	(Argentina) Adolfo Pedernera
FW	(Argentina) Ángel Labruna
FW	(Argentina) Félix Loustau
Manager:
(Argentina) Carlos Peucelle

GK	(Uruguay) Roque Máspoli
DF	(Uruguay) Mario Lorenzo
DF	(Italy) Sixto Possamay
MF	(Uruguay) José Pedro Colturi
MF	(Uruguay) Obdulio Varela
MF	(Uruguay) Luis Prais
FW	(Uruguay) Juan Manuel Ortiz
FW	(Argentina) Domingo Gelpi
FW	(Uruguay) Raúl Schiaffino
FW	(Uruguay) Óscar Chirimini
FW	(Italy) Ernesto Vidal
Manager:
(Uruguay) Alberto Supicci
