= 1940 Copa Aldao =

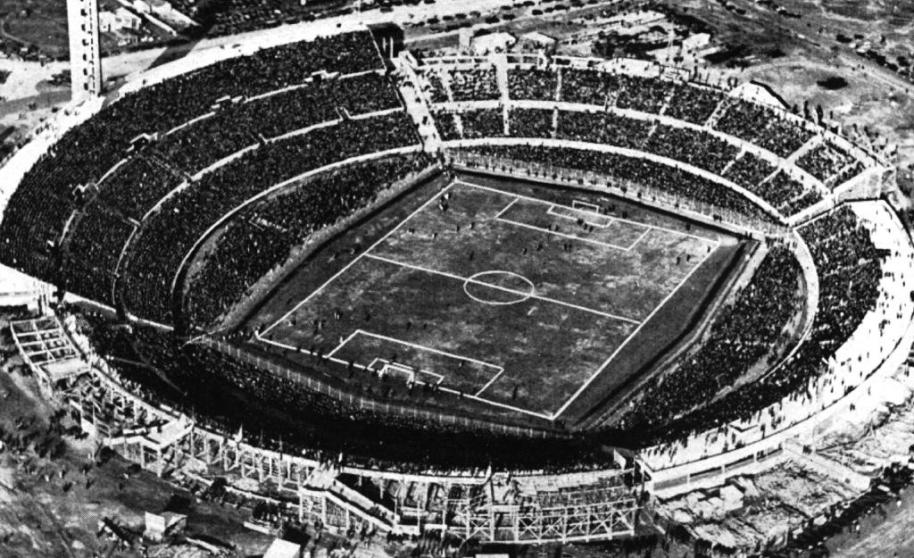
- Estadio Centenario, venue of the final
- Event: Copa Aldao
Nacional	Boca Juniors
(Uruguay)	(Argentina)
2	2
- (suspended at 88', no champion crowned)
- Date: December 28, 1940
- Venue: Estadio Centenario, Montevideo
- Referee: Aníbal Tejada (Uruguay)

The 1940 Copa Aldao was the final match to decide the winner of the Copa Aldao, the 13th edition of the international competition organised by the Argentine and Uruguayan Associations together. The final was contested by Uruguayan club Nacional and Argentine side Boca Juniors.

The match was played at Estadio Centenario in Montevideo. With Boca Juniors winning 2–1, on 88 minutes Nacional striker Atilio García forced a draw. Players of Boca Juniors protested alleging the goal had been scored after the regulatory time, but referee Tejada not only awarded the goal to Nacional but sent off Pedro Arico Suárez and coach Enrique Sobral.

As a result, Boca Juniors players left the field in protest of Tejada's decision (who stated that the goal was scored in the 88th minute). To determine a winner, both associations, AFA and AUF, agreed to schedule a second match for January 22, 1941. However, Boca refused to participate, and no champion was crowned.

== Qualified teams ==
Team	Qualification	Previous final app.
(Uruguay) Nacional	1940 Uruguayan Primera División champion	**1916**, 1917, **1919, 1920**, 1939
(Argentina) Boca Juniors	1940 Argentine Primera División champion	1919, 1920

- **Bold** indicates winning years

== Match details ==
1940 Copa Aldao
December 28, 1940

Nacional (Uruguay)	2–2	(Argentina) Boca Juniors
García 42', 88'	Report	Emeal 19'; Gandulla 82'

Estadio Centenario, Montevideo
Referee: Aníbal Tejada (Uruguay)

**Nacional**	**Boca Juniors**

GK	(Uruguay) Aníbal Paz
DF	(Uruguay) Héctor Romero
DF	(Uruguay) Juan R. Cabrera
MF	(Uruguay) Luis Pérez Luz
MF	(Uruguay) Eugenio Galvalisi
MF	(Uruguay) Schubert Gambetta
FW	(Uruguay) Luis Castro
FW	(Uruguay) Aníbal Ciocca
FW	(Argentina) Atilio García
FW	(Uruguay) Roberto Porta
FW	(Uruguay) Bibiano Zapirain
Manager:
(Uruguay) Héctor Castro

GK	(Argentina) Juan Alberto Estrada
DF	(Argentina) Segundo Ibáñez
DF	(Argentina) José M. Marante
MF	(Argentina) Arcado J. López
MF	(Argentina) Ernesto Lazzatti
MF	(Argentina) Pedro Arico Suárez	(red card) 88'
FW	(Argentina) Domingo Gelpi
FW	(Argentina) Luis A. Carniglia
FW	(Argentina) Jaime Sarlanga
FW	(Argentina) Bernardo Gandulla
FW	(Argentina) Raúl F. Emeal
Manager:
(Argentina) Enrique Sobral (red card) 89'
