= Norberto Yácono =

Argentine footballer and manager

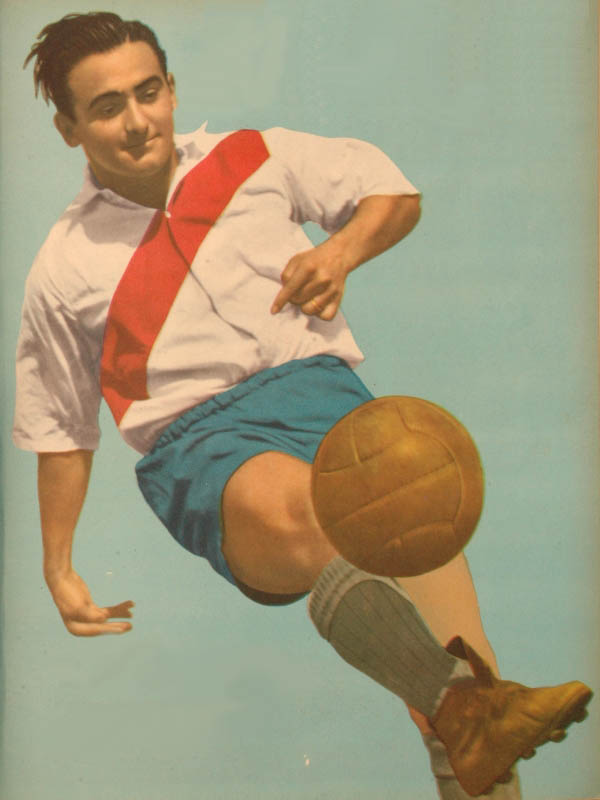
- Yácono in 1942.

Personal information
- Full name: Norberto Antonio Yácono
- Date of birth: January 8, 1919
- Place of birth: Buenos Aires, Argentina
- Date of death: November 1985 (aged 66)
- Height: 1.62 m (5 ft 4 in)
- Position: Defender

Youth career
- 1933–1938: River Plate

Senior career*
| Years | Team | Apps | (Gls) |
| 1938–1953 | River Plate | 393 | (0) |
| 1953–1958 | Club América | ? | (?) |
| 1958–1959 | Montreal Cantalia SC | | |
| 1959 | Alouettes (Montreal) | | |
| 1960–1962 | in the USA | | |

International career
| 1942–1951 | Argentina | 15 | (0) |

Managerial career
- 1961: Montreal Cantalia SC
- * Club domestic league appearances and goals as of November 2008

Norberto Yácono (also Iacono / 8 January 1919 – November 1985) was an Argentine professional association football player who played as right-back mainly for River Plate. Yácono participated in the historic team known as "La Máquina" and he is widely regardered as one of the best defenders in the Argentine Primera División and he is also one of the players with the most appearances for River Plate.

Nicknamed ''Estampilla'' (Stamp) due to his man-to-man mark, was an undisputed starter throughout his years in the historic River Plate team.

Yácono also participed in the Argentina national team, where he won the 1947 Copa America.

== Playing career ==
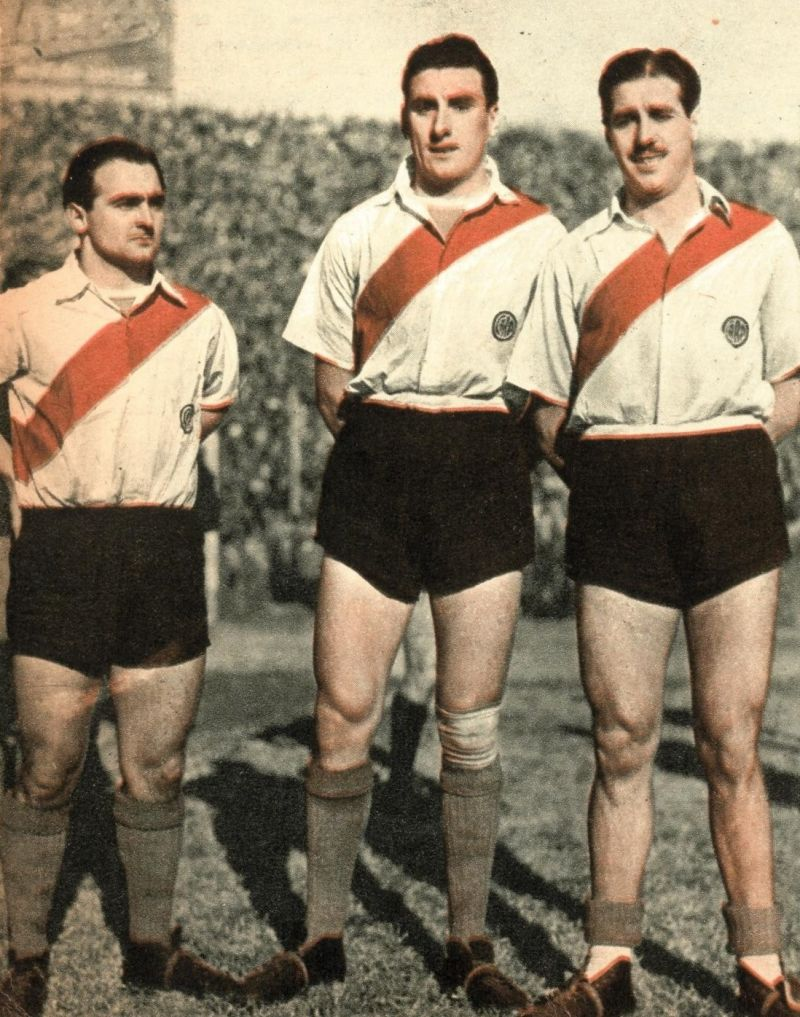
The middle line of River Plate in 1945. From left to right: Norberto Yácono, Néstor Rossi and José Ramos.

"Pacho" or "Pacha" Yácono was taken by a friend of his father to a test training at River Plate in 1933 when he was 13 years of age. He was chosen to stay and he made his debut for the professional team on 28 May 1939 in a match against Newell's Old Boys which was also the very last match of Bernabé Ferreyra, who for a long period has been the most expensive player in the world. In 1941, 1942, 1945, 1947, 1952 and 1953 he won six league championships with the club. He also won each three times, the Copa Ibarguren, a competition between the winners of Argentine provincial championships, and the Copa Aldao, a competition between the champions of Argentina and Uruguay. Altogether the right fullback, particularly praised for his man-marking skills, played 393 times in official matches for River Plate - which puts him in the 9th rank in club history - albeit, he never scored. Notably he was one of the players that remained with the club in the late 1940s, when others like Néstor Rossi, Adolfo Pedernera and the young Alfredo Di Stéfano left in the course of the big players strike then.

He debuted for the national team on 12 August 1942 in the Estádio Centenario of Montevideo when Argentina drew 1–1 against Uruguay in a match for the Copa Lipton. The highlight of his career with Argentina was the South American Championship 1947 in which he featured in six of the seven matches in Guayaquil, Ecuador's second city. Argentina won the tournament undefeated. His 15th and last match for the albiceleste when he captained Argentina in a friendly in London's Wembley Stadium on 9 May 1951. They lost to the hosts 2–1.

Well into his mid-thirties he left River in 1953 to play for América in Mexico City. With América he won the finals of the cup competition, the Copa México, of 1954 and 1955, in both cases defeating CD Guadalajara. In 1955-56 he served as coach for the club.

By May 1958 he moved to Montreal in Canada where he initially played in the National Soccer League – which consisted of 10 clubs from Toronto, two from Hamilton just about 70 km southwest of Toronto, and three from Montreal – for Cantalia SC, a club supported by Italian immigrants. At the time they also hired Alberto Piavone from Buenos Aires who in 15 years with Ferro Carril Oeste became the second highest scorer of that club. The league competition was won by Montreal Hungaria and Cantalia became sixth.

For the 1959 season he joined the Alouettes, also in Montreal. This time the league was won by Cantalia and Alouettes finished 7th. However, they went on to win the Canadian cup competition, the National Challenge Cup, of 1959, widely considered the quasi national championship. For this purpose they defeated on September 19 the Westminster Royals from the Vancouver region 3–2 in the Fred Hamilton Park in Toronto's "Little Italy". His teammate Tony Bonezzi, who was also born in Buenos Aires, would die eight years later in a tragic accident in Israel, aged just 35.

From 1960 to 1962 he finished his playing career in the US.

== Honours ==
River Plate

- Primera División Argentina: 1941, 1942, 1945, 1947, 1952, 1953.
- Copa Ibarguren: 1941, 1942, 1952.
- Copa Aldao: 1941, 1945, 1947.
- South American Championship of Champions runner-up: 1948

Club América

- Copa México: 1954, 1955.

Montreal Cantalia SC

- Canadian National Challenge Cup: 1959.

Argentina

- Copa América: 1947

== Coaching career ==
In 1961, he was the head coach for Montreal Cantalia in the Eastern Canada Professional Soccer League. After retiring as a player in the early 1960s Yácono returned to Argentina where he worked as the manager of Sportivo Italiano, Lanús and Godoy Cruz. Later in his career he took up a position of youth team coach for River Plate. After he immigrated to the US and lived in New Jersey, he was still very active with soccer and became the coach for Iberia Airlines of Spain in the New York Airlines Soccer League, which does not exist any more . That was in the early 70s. His knowledge and passion for soccer helped the team to win the championship in 1973. Through the efforts of Norberto Yacono, Iberia Airlines was able to incorporate in the team recently retired players from Argentina, such as Norberto Troilo and Guillermo Heredia. His son, "Pichi", also played for the team that winning year.

It is reported that for arranging the match between Kansas City Spurs and Brazil's Santos FC around their superstar Pelé during their tour of the US in 1968 he was bestowed the honorary citizenship of Kansas City.
