= Carlos Aldabe =

Argentine footballer (1919–1998)

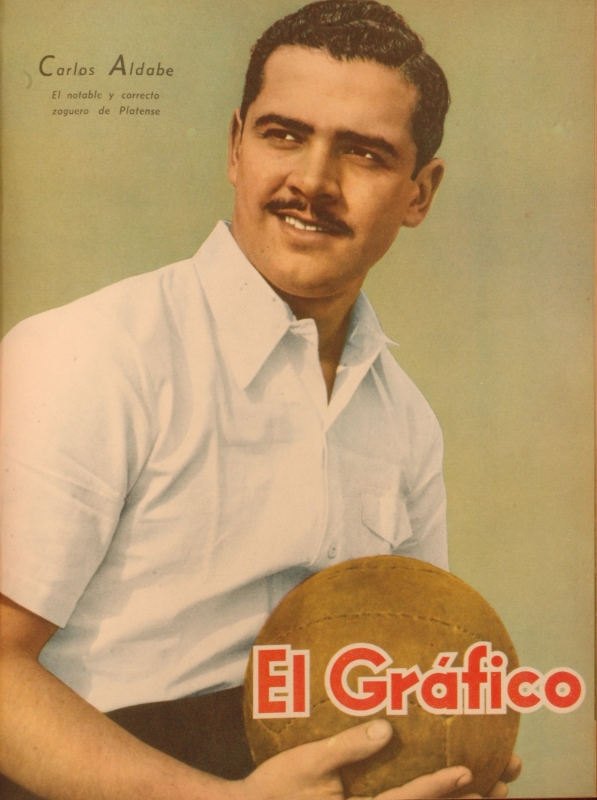
- Aldabe on the cover of El Gráfico in July 1942

Personal information
- Date of birth: 1 January 1919
- Date of death: 16 October 1998 (aged 79)
- Position: Defender

Senior career*
Years	Team	Apps	(Gls)
1939–1944	Platense	119	
1941	→ Independiente (loan)		
1945–1946	Quilmes AC	75	(1)
1949	CD Los Millonarios		
1950–1951	Ceclista de Peru		
1952	Santa Fe CD		
1953	Universidad		

Managerial career
- 1949: CD Los Millonarios
- 1953–1954: Quilmes AC
- 1956: CD Universidad Católica
- 1957–1958: Everton de Viña del Mar
- 1960: CA Talleres
- 1960–1961: Gimnasia y Esgrima La Plata
- 1961: Argentinos Juniors
- 1962: Club Almagro
- 1963–1964: Estudiantes de La Plata
- 1965: CA Excursionistas
- 1966: Ferro Carril Oeste
- 1968: CA Talleres
Medal record
First place	Categoría Primera A	1949
Second place	Primera B de Chile	1956
- * Club domestic league appearances and goals

Carlos Roberto Aldabe (1 January 1919 – 16 October 1998) was an Argentine association football player and coach. He is mostly known for leading the then prominently staffed Colombian club CD Los Millonarios as player-manager to their first championship.

As player Aldabe was from 1939 to 1944 a defender with CA Platense in the Argentine first division and from 1945 to 1946 with Quilmes AC in the second division Primera B. Both clubs are located in the Province of Buenos Aires.

He joined CD Los Millonarios in the Colombian capital Bogotá where he was player-manager in 1949. After the professionalisation of the Colombian football in the previous season the Argentine star El Maestro Adolfo Pedernera from CA River Plate in Buenos Aires joined the club in June 1949. Two months later he was followed by Néstor Rossi and Alfredo Di Stéfano from the same club. The acquisition of top stars from Argentina was aided by player strikes in Argentina in the years 1947 and 1948 which disrupted regular play and Colombia accepting players that were not formally released from there previous clubs. In practical terms this meant that Millonarios and the other Colombian clubs did not have to pay any transfer fees, which in turn led to a suspension of the country from FIFA-membership.

Still in 1949 CD Los Millonarios won its first Colombian championship title. In the following year Adolfo Pedernera took on the responsibilities as player-manager – a position in which he would lead the side, then known as Ballet Azul, the "Blue Ballet" until 1954 to further titles. Aldabe initially continued playing for Millonarios, but later in the year moved on to Peru where he joined Ciclista Lima, a club which has just rejoined the first division after relegation two years earlier. Star of the side in this phase was the striker Juan Emilio Salinas. From mid-1952 he played a few more matches in Colombia for Santa Fe CD and in the following year for Universidad from Bogotá.

After his return to Argentina he coached there between 1953 and 1968 several professional clubs, albeit none of the top sides. After an engagement with second division side Quilmes AC between 1953 and 1954 he worked in Chile. In 1956 he coached CD Universidad Católica in the capital Santiago, where the legendary keeper Sergio Livingstone stood in the goal mouth. In the previous season Universidad happened to be relegated as the incumbent champions, but by the end of 1956 managed to return to the top flight. Between 1957 and 1958 he coached Everton de Viña del Mar in the north of the country.

Between 1960 and 1968 he held six more relatively short-term engagements with Argentine first and second division clubs – without adding to his trophy tally.

== Statistical overview ==
Coaching career

- 1949: CD Los Millonarios
- 1953–1954: Quilmes AC (Liga Primera B)
- 1956: CD Universidad Católica (Chile) (second division)
- 1957–1958: Everton de Viña del Mar (Chile)
- 1960: CA Talleres (Remedios de Escalada) (1960 Relegation to Primera B)
- 1960–1961: Gimnasia y Esgrima La Plata
- 1961: Argentinos Juniors
- 1962: Club Almagro (Liga Primera B)
- 1963–1964: Estudiantes de la Plata
- 1965: CA Excursionistas
- 1966: Ferro Carril Oeste
- 1968: CA Talleres
