= 1941 Copa Aldao =

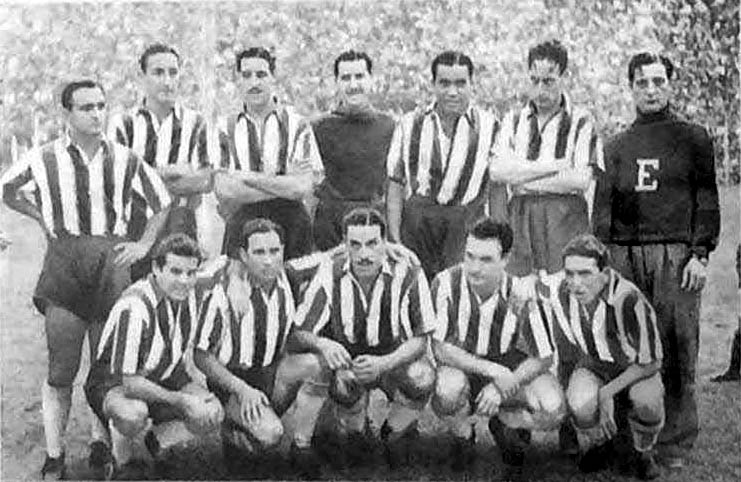
- River Plate, champions
- Event: Copa Aldao
River Plate	Nacional
(Argentina)	(Uruguay)
- River Plate won 3–1 on points

First leg
River Plate	Nacional
6	1
- River Plate won 3–1 on points
- Date: March 29, 1942
- Venue: San Lorenzo
- Referee: Eugenio Braun (Argentina)

Second leg
Nacional	River Plate
1	1
- Date: December 5, 1942
- Venue: Estadio Centenario, Montevideo
- Referee: Aníbal Tejada (Uruguay)

The 1941 Copa Aldao was the final match to decide the winner of the Copa Aldao, the 14th edition of the international competition organised by the Argentine and Uruguayan Associations together. The final was contested by Uruguayan club Nacional and Argentine side River Plate.

Starting with this edition, a two-legged system was established. In the first match, played at San Lorenzo de Almagro Stadium, the local team beat Nacional with a conclusive 6–1 win. In the second leg played at Estadio Centenario in Montevideo, both teams drew 1–1, therefore River Plate won its third Copa Aldao in three editions contested.

== Qualified teams ==
Team	Qualification	Previous final app.
(Argentina) River Plate	1941 Primera División champions	2 (**1936, 1937**)
(Uruguay) Nacional	1941 Primera División champions	6 (**1916**, 1917, **1919, 1920**, 1939, 1940)

- **Bold** indicates winning years

== Venues ==
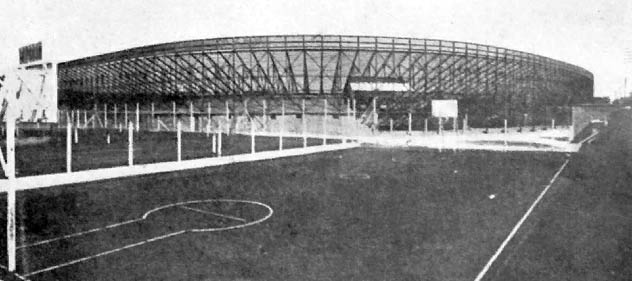
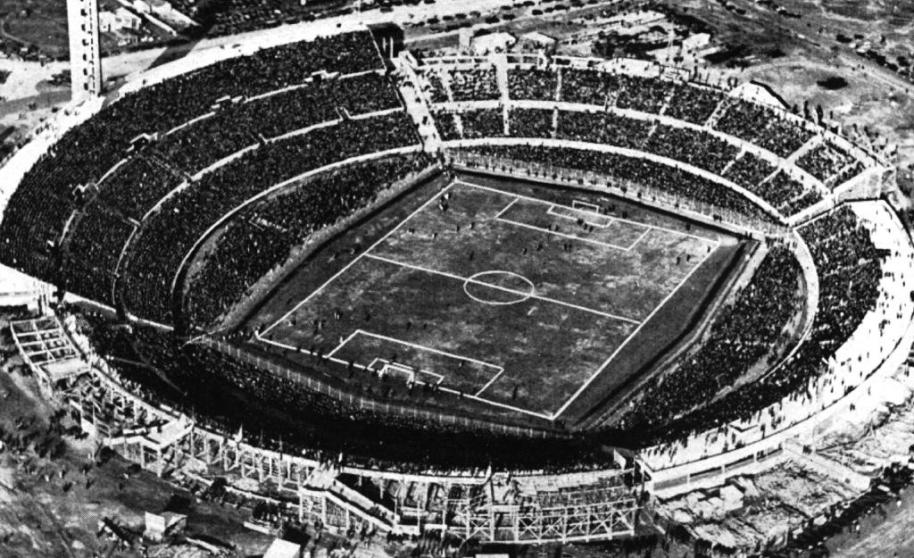
San Lorenzo de Almagro (left) and Estadio Centenario, venues for the series

== Match details ==
=== First leg ===
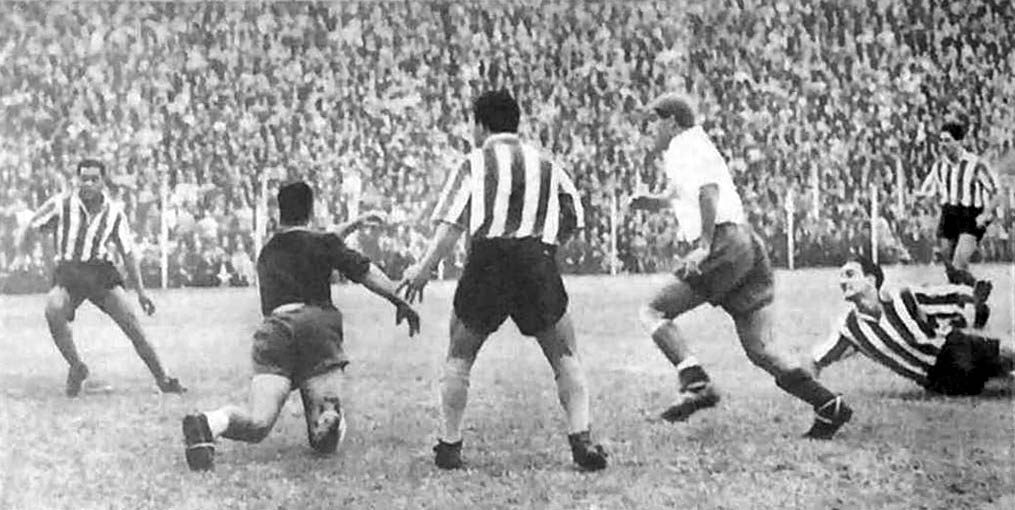
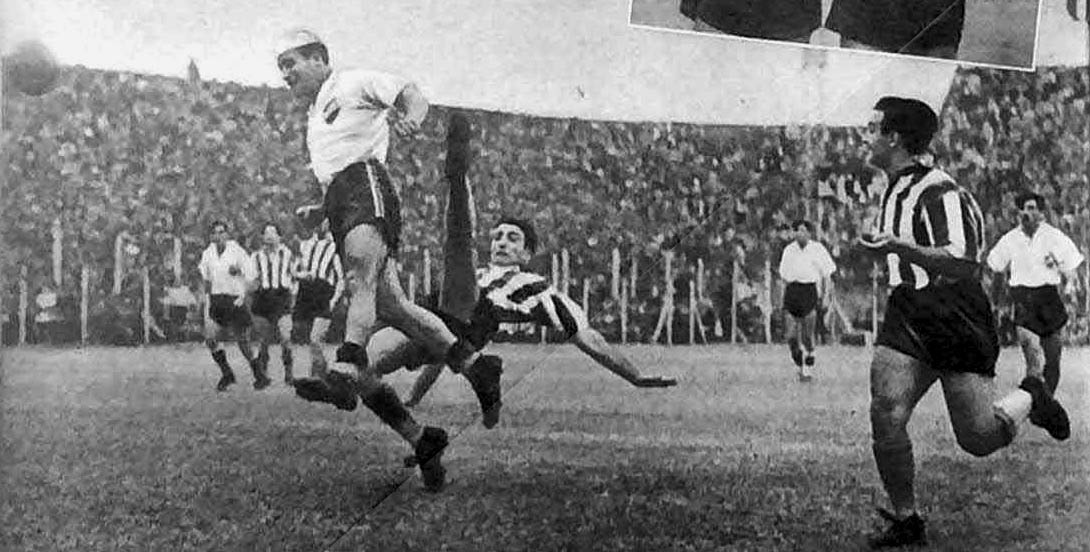
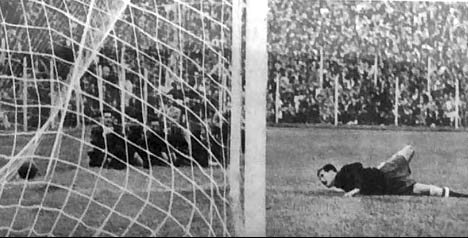
Some moments of the match at Gasómetro Stadium in Buenos Aires
1941 Copa Aldao
March 29, 1942
First leg

River Plate (Argentina)	6–1	(Uruguay) Nacional
Labruna 23', 89', 93'; D'Alessandro 24', 50', 64'	Report	García 43'

San Lorenzo de Almagro, Buenos Aires
Attendance: 60,000
Referee: Eugenio Braun (Argentina)

**River Plate**	**Nacional**

GK	(Argentina) Julio Barrios
DF	(Argentina) Ricardo Vaghi
DF	(Argentina) Avelino Cadilla
MF	(Argentina) Norberto Yácono
MF	(Argentina) Bruno Rodolfi
MF	(Argentina) José Ramos
FW	(Argentina) Juan C. Muñoz
FW	(Argentina) José M. Moreno
FW	(Argentina) Roberto D'Alessandro
FW	(Argentina) Ángel Labruna
FW	(Argentina) Aristóbulo Deambrossi
Manager:
(Argentina) Renato Cesarini

GK	(Uruguay) Aníbal Paz
DF	(Uruguay) Héctor Romero
DF	(Uruguay) Juan R. Cabrera
MF	(Uruguay) Luis Pérez Luz
MF	(Uruguay) R. Pini
MF	(Uruguay) Schubert Gambetta
FW	(Uruguay) Luis Castro
FW	(Uruguay) Aníbal Ciocca
FW	(Argentina) Atilio García
FW	(Uruguay) Roberto Porta
FW	(Uruguay) Bibiano Zapirain
Manager:
(Uruguay) Héctor Castro

=== Second leg ===
December 5, 1942
Second leg

Nacional (Uruguay)	1–1	(Argentina) River Plate
García 60'	Report	Labruna 61'

Estadio Centenario, Montevideo
Referee: Aníbal Tejada (Uruguay)

**Nacional**	**River Plate**

GK	(Uruguay) Aníbal Paz
DF	(Uruguay) Morales
DF	(Uruguay) Dándolo Rodríguez
MF	(Uruguay) Luis Pérez Luz
MF	(Uruguay) Eugenio Galvalisi
MF	(Uruguay) Bartivez
FW	(Uruguay) Luis Castro
FW	(Uruguay) Aníbal Ciocca
FW	(Argentina) Atilio García
FW	(Uruguay) José Fabrini
FW	(Uruguay) Bibiano Zapirain
Manager:
(Uruguay) Héctor Castro

GK	(Argentina) Sebastián Sirni
DF	(Argentina) Ricardo Vaghi
DF	(Argentina) Luis A. Ferreyra
MF	(Argentina) Norberto Yácono
MF	(Argentina) Bruno Rodolfi
MF	(Argentina) José Ramos
FW	(Argentina) Juan C. Muñoz
FW	(Argentina) José M. Moreno
FW	(Argentina) Roberto D'Alessandro
FW	(Argentina) Ángel Labruna
FW	(Argentina) Aristóbulo Deambrossi
Manager:
(Argentina) Renato Cesarini
