= Ricardo Faccio =

Uruguayan footballer (1907-1970)

Personal information
- Full name: Ricardo Gregorio Faccio Peralta
- Date of birth: 12 March 1907
- Place of birth: Durazno Department, Uruguay
- Date of death: 9 September 1970 (aged 63)
- Position: Midfielder

Senior career*
Years	Team	Apps	(Gls)
1927	Universal		
1929	Montevideo Wanderers		
1931–1933	Nacional		
1933–1936	Ambrosiana-Inter	86	(0)
1936–1939	Nacional		
1940–1941	Bella Vista		

International career
1932–1934	Uruguay	3	(0)
1935–1936	Italy	5	(0)
Medal record
Italy
Central European International Cup
Gold medal – first place	1933–35 Central European International Cup
- * Club domestic league appearances and goals

Ricardo Gregorio Faccio Peralta, known as Ricardo Faccio or Riccardo Faccio (Italian pronunciation: [rikˈkardo ˈfattʃo]; 12 March 1907 – 9 September 1970) was a Uruguayan-Italian professional footballer who played as a midfielder. He was born in Uruguay and played for the Uruguay national football team but later received Italian citizenship and played for Italy internationally, where he was a part of the squad that won the 1933–35 Central European International Cup.

== Career ==
Born in Durazno Department, Faccio began playing football for Club Universal and Montevideo Wanderers F.C. In 1934, he moved to Italy to play for Ambrosiana-Inter.

== International ==
Italy

- Central European International Cup: 1933-35
