= Raúl Schiaffino =

Uruguayan footballer

Personal information
- Full name: Raúl Antonio Schiaffino Villalba
- Date of birth: 7 December 1923
- Place of birth: Montevideo, Uruguay
- Date of death: unknown
- Position: Forward

International career
Years	Team	Apps	(Gls)
1945–1946	Uruguay	2	(0)

Raúl Antonio Schiaffino Villalba (born 7 December 1923, date of death unknown) was a Uruguayan footballer who played as a forward. He played in two matches for the Uruguay national football team in 1945 and 1946. He was also part of Uruguay's squad for the 1946 South American Championship.
