= Néstor Rossi =

Argentine footballer

- Rossi in 1957

Personal information
- Full name: Néstor Raúl Rossi
- Date of birth: 10 May 1925
- Place of birth: Buenos Aires, Argentina
- Date of death: 13 June 2007 (aged 82)
- Place of death: Buenos Aires, Argentina
- Height: 1.85 m (6 ft 1 in)
- Positions: Defensive midfielder; defender

Senior career*
Years	Team	Apps	(Gls)
1945–1949	River Plate	92	(6)
1949–1954	Millonarios	113	(6)
1955–1958	River Plate	62	(1)
1959–1961	Huracán	54	(1)

International career
1946–1961	Argentina	26	(0)

Managerial career
- 1961: Huracán
- 1961: Tigre
- 1961–1962: River Plate
- 1962: Argentina
- 1963: Racing Club
- 1964: Tigre
- 1965: Boca Juniors
- 1966-?: Millonarios
- 1968: Huracán
- ?: Granada
- ?: Cerro Porteño
- 1973: Atlanta
- 1974: River Plate
- 1974–1975: Elche
- 1983: Toronto Italia
- 1985: All Boys
- ?: Huracán
- ?: Atlanta
- ?: Colón
- * Club domestic league appearances and goals

Néstor Raúl "Pipo" Rossi (Buenos Aires, 10 May 1925 – 13 June 2007) was an Argentine professional association footballer who played as a centre midfielder or defensive midfielder mainly for Argentine club River Plate. Rossi participated in the historic team known as "La Máquina", its successor, ''La Maquinita'', and the Argentina national team.

Considered by the IFFHS as one of the best midfielders in the history of the Argentina national team.

== Club career ==
Nicknamed "Pipo", he started his career at River Plate, playing from 1945 to 1949, and then again from 1955 to 1958, winning a total of 5 Argentine leagues. In total, Rossi played 155 matches for River Plate scoring 7 goals. From 1949 to 1954, he played in Colombia for Millonarios, winning six trophies. He also had a spell in Argentine Huracán, playing 54 matches.

Rossi played for the Argentina national football team during the 1958 FIFA World Cup, as well as in the Copa América on several occasions, winning the 1947 and 1957 editions. Along with Brazilian Djalma Santos, he was the only player to be unanimously voted into the 1957 South American Championship squad.

== Managerial career ==
After retirement, he managed the Spanish Liga team Granada Club de Fútbol and River Plate in Argentina. He had a brief spell as manager of the Argentina national team in 1962. He replaced Adolfo Pedernera at Boca Juniors in 1965 to win the Argentine title. He also had a spell in charge of Ferro Carril Oeste in 1977. In 1983, he, along with Omar Sívori, was named the head coach of Toronto Italia in the National Soccer League, and managed the team's youth side.

== Honours ==
=== Player ===
River Plate

- Argentine Primera División: 1945, 1947, 1955, 1956, 1957
- Copa Aldao: 1945, 1947
- South American Championship of Champions runner-up: 1948

Millonarios

- Categoría Primera A: 1949, 1951, 1952, 1953
- Copa Colombia: 1953
- Small Club World Cup: 1953

Argentina

- Copa América: 1947, 1957

=== Individual ===
- IFFHS Argentina All Times Dream Team (Team C): 2021

=== Manager ===
Boca Juniors

- Argentine Primera División: 1965
