= Copa Aldao =

Copa Ricardo Aldao
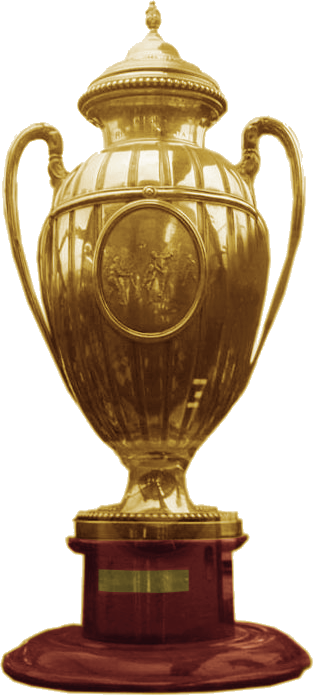
- The trophy awarded to champions
- Organiser(s): (Argentina) AFA (Uruguay) AUF
- Founded: 1913
- Abolished: 1955; 71 years ago
- Region: Buenos Aires, Argentina; Montevideo, Uruguay
- Teams: 2
- Related competitions: Copa Campeonato del Río de la Plata
- Last champions: (Argentina) River Plate (1947)
- Most championships: (Argentina) River Plate (5 titles)

The Copa Ricardo Aldao (English: Ricardo Aldao Cup), popularly called Campeonato Rioplatense and Copa Río de La Plata, was an official AFA-AUF football club competition contested annually, albeit irregularly, between the league champions of Argentina and Uruguay. The trophy was donated by Argentine football executive Ricardo Aldao (1863–1956), who would later become president of the Argentine Football Association.

The cup is one of several inter-South American club competitions that have been organised on the continent. The first competition was scheduled for the 1913 season (although it was never played) and the last in 1955 (actually played in 1959, no champions proclaimed). The Copa Ricardo Aldao is seen today as the first stepping-stone toward the creation of the Copa Libertadores. In 2009, when the IFFHS proclaimed Peñarol of Montevideo as the best South American team of the 20th century, they took into consideration the Copa Aldao and other international club tournaments played in South America before the beginning of Copa Libertadores in 1960.

In August 2015, a CONMEBOL's article described Aldao Cup as one of the first international professional football cups in South America.

Many important footballers played in the competitions such as the Argentines Jose Manuel Moreno, Angel Labruna, Guillermo Stabile, Alfredo Di Stefano, Adolfo Pedernera, Amadeo Carrizo, Carlos Peucelle, Felix Loustau, Nestor Rossi, Antonio Sastre, Bernardo Gandulla, the Italian-born Renato Cesarini and Ernesto Vidal, the Uruguayans Roque Máspoli, Ángel Romano, Obdulio Varela, Hector Scarone, Juan Alberto Schiaffino, Anibal Paz, Severino Varela, and Paraguayan legend Arsenio Erico, among others.

== History ==
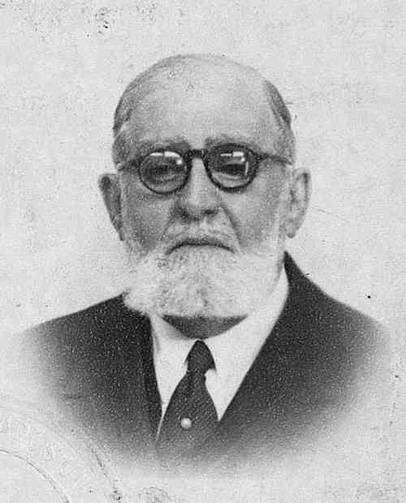
Argentine football executive Ricardo Aldao donated the trophy, giving his name to the competition

Friendly matches were common between clubs from Argentina and Uruguay in the early 1900s due to the close proximity of the nations. Inevitably, a match to decide which national champions were the best formulated; the trophy of the competition was donated by Ricardo Aldao, then president of both, club Gimnasia y Esgrima (BA) and dissident association "Federación Argentina de Football". As such, the competition was named after his donation. The first edition, organized in 1913, was to be contested between Estudiantes from Argentina and River Plate from Uruguay. However, the match was suspended due to heavy rain and never rescheduled. The first champion of the competition was not crowned until 1916, when Nacional of Montevideo beat Racing de Avellaneda 2–1.

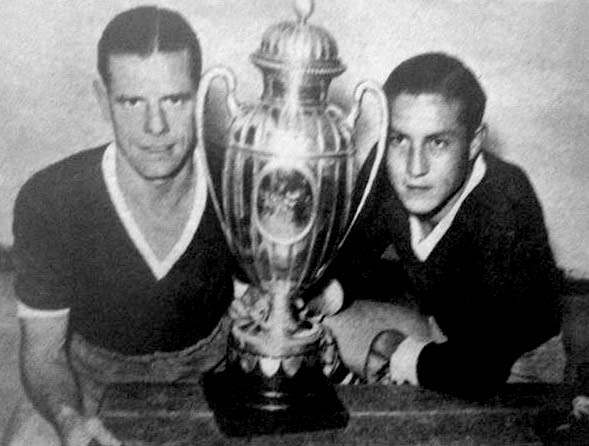
Independiente players (Antonio Sastre at left and Arsenio Erico) with the Copa Aldao trophy in 1938

Originally, a single-legged format was adopted, with the match played in Argentina and Uruguay in alternative year. But in 1940, Boca Juniors left the field when the match, played at Montevideo, was at a draw of 2–2 and headed for extra-time. The title was awarded to Nacional at first, yet later on both associations did not defined clearly the champions of this year. Asociación Uruguaya de Fútbol (AUF) and Argentine Football Association (AFA) studied the situation on 22 January 1941, and announced that a two-legged format would be adopted in the following seasons. The finals should be disputed before the beginning of the next season. Only players that had been part of the domestic champion squads could be included. Since then, the competition was played two-legged exception made of the 1942 edition, when the second leg was not played and the trophy was not awarded.

Schedule problems forced teams of both countries to quit the Aldao Cup during the 1950s, thus the competition was discontinued until 1959. One last attempt was made to rekindle the championship in 1955 in a match between Nacional and River Plate. However, the final was not disputed until four years later and the second leg was never played; therefore, the title was not officially proclaimed. As a result, to the schedule congestion of the growing national leagues (as well as the creation of the new continental club tournament, the Copa Libertadores de América) the Copa Aldao became redundant and was never played again.

== List of champions ==
=== Finals ===
Below is a list with all the finals played. Since 1941, it was ruled that the cup would be defined in two legs.

Ed.	Year	Champion	Runner-up	1st Leg	Venue	2nd Leg	Venue	Points
1	1913	(abandoned) (Note: Argentine historian Miguel Bionda (in his book Historia del Fútbol Platense) asserts that the 1913 edition was indeed played and Estudiantes de La Plata beat Uruguayan River Plate 4–1. Likewise, the magazines Estudiantes del Mundo: 100 años de gloria, published by Argentine newspaper El Día in 2005, and the book Historia de Estudiantes de La Plata, edited by Diario Hoy in 1997 agreed with that. On the other hand, other sources, like the RSSSF and the Centro para la Investigación de la Historia del Fútbol state that the game was suspended due to rain.)						
2	1916	(Uruguay) Nacional (1)	(Argentina) Racing	2–1	GEBA	–		
3	1917	(Argentina) Racing (1)	(Uruguay) Nacional	2–2	Parque Pereira	2–1 (Note: Not a second leg but a playoff match to determine a champion.)	GEBA	2–1
4	1918	(Argentina) Racing (2)	(Uruguay) Peñarol	2–1	GEBA	–		
5	1919	(Uruguay) Nacional (2)	(Argentina) Boca Juniors	3–0	Parque Central	–		
6	1920	(Uruguay) Nacional (3)	(Argentina) Boca Juniors	2–1	Sp. Barracas	–		
–	1923	(not held) (Note: Replaced by a match between San Lorenzo and Wandereres named "Copa Campeonato del Río de la Plata" (San Lorenzo won 1–0). Both clubs belonged to dissident associations so it was not a "Copa Aldao" edition.)						
7	1927	(Argentina) San Lorenzo (1)	(Uruguay) Rampla Juniors	1–0	Parque Central	–		
8	1928	(Uruguay) Peñarol (1)	(Argentina) Huracán	3–0	River Plate	–		
9	1936	(Argentina) River Plate (1)	(Uruguay) Peñarol	5–1	Centenario	–		
10	1937	(Argentina) River Plate (2)	(Uruguay) Peñarol	5–2	San Lorenzo	–		
11	1938	(Argentina) Independiente (1)	(Uruguay) Peñarol	3–1	Centenario	–		
12	1939	(Argentina) Independiente (2)	(Uruguay) Nacional	5–0	San Lorenzo	–		
13	1940	(no champion crowned) (Note: Nacional and Boca Juniors played a match at Estadio Centenario on 28 December 1940 which ended in a 2–2 draw. Boca Juniors left the field before the extra time, then the cup was initially awarded to Nacional, but eventually neither association designated a champion.)		2–2	Centenario	(not played)		
14	1941	(Argentina) River Plate (3)	(Uruguay) Nacional	6–1	San Lorenzo	1–1	Centenario	2–1
15	1942	(no champion crowned) (Note: Nacional beat River Plate 4–0 in the first leg played at Montevideo, but the cup was never officially awarded as the second leg was never disputed.)		4–0	Centenario	(not played)		
16	1945	(Argentina) River Plate (4)	(Uruguay) Peñarol	2–1	Centenario	3–2	San Lorenzo	4–0
–	1946	(not held) (Note: Replaced by two friendly matches between both finalists (Nacional and San Lorenzo).)						
17	1947	(Argentina) River Plate (5)	(Uruguay) Nacional	4–3	Centenario	3–1	San Lorenzo	4–0
18	1957	(no champion crowned) (Note: River Plate beat Nacional 2–1 in the first leg played at Montevideo, but the cup was never officially awarded as the second leg was never disputed.)		2–1	Centenario	(not played)		

=== Titles by club ===
Team	Titles	Years won
(Argentina) River Plate	5	1936, 1937, 1941, 1945, 1947
(Uruguay) Nacional	3	1916, 1919, 1920
(Argentina) Independiente	2	1938, 1939
(Argentina) Racing	2	1917, 1918
(Uruguay) Peñarol	1	1928
(Argentina) San Lorenzo	1	1927

=== Titles by country ===
Country	Titles	Winner teams
Argentina	10	River Plate (5), Racing (2), Independiente (2), San Lorenzo (1)
Uruguay	4	Nacional (3), Peñarol (1)

== All-time top scorers ==
Player	Goals	Club
(Argentina) Ángel Labruna	12	(Argentina) River Plate
(Argentina) Atilio García	8	(Uruguay) Nacional
(Argentina) Adolfo Pedernera	4	(Argentina) River Plate
(Paraguay) Arsenio Erico	4	(Argentina) Independiente
(Uruguay) Ángel Romano	4	(Uruguay) Nacional
(Argentina) Hugo Reyes	4	(Argentina) River Plate

== Most finals by player ==
- 6: (Argentina) Atilio García (won 2), (Uruguay) Anibal Paz (won 2)
- 5: (Uruguay) Hector Scarone (won 4), (Argentina) José Manuel Moreno (won 4)
- 4: (Argentina) Angel Labruna (won 3), (Uruguay) Alfredo Foglino (won3), (Argentina) Ricardo Vaghi (won 3), (Argentina) Adolfo Pedernera (won 3), (Argentina) Felix Loustau (won 3), (Uruguay) Angel Romano (won 3), (Uruguay) Roberto Porta (won 1),
- 3: (Argentina) Alberto Marcovecchio (won 3), (Argentina) Carlos Peucelle (won 3), (Uruguay) Carlos Scarone (won 2), (Uruguay) Hector Castro (won 1), (Uruguay) Severino Varela (won 0)

== See also ==
- South American Championship of Champions
- Copa Campeonato del Río de la Plata
