= Félix Loustau =

Argentine footballer (1922–2003)

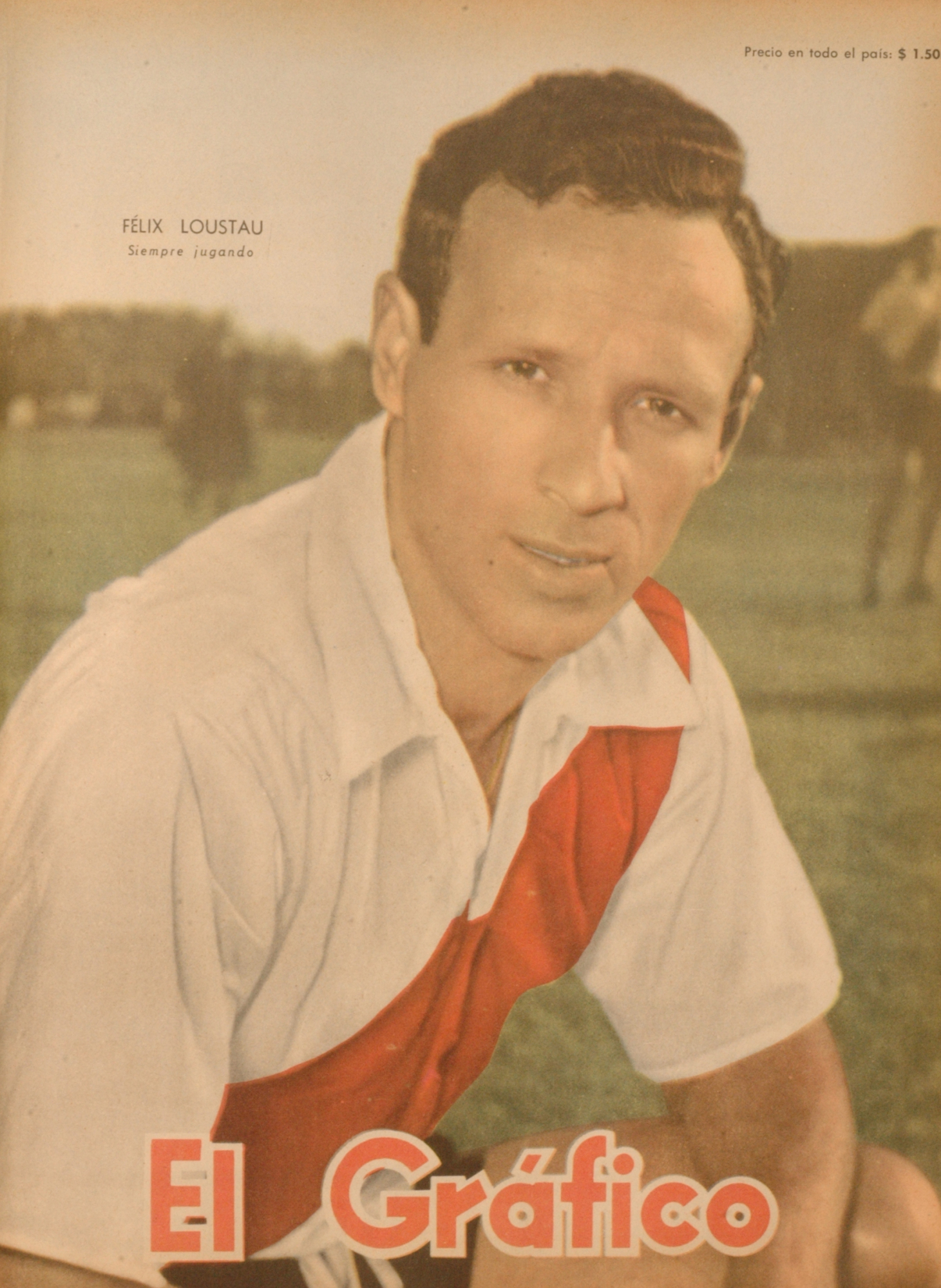
- Loustau in 1955

Personal information
- Full name: Félix Loustau
- Date of birth: 25 December 1922
- Place of birth: Avellaneda, Argentina
- Date of death: 5 January 2003 (aged 80)
- Place of death: Avellaneda, Argentina
- Position: Left winger

Youth career
- Sportivo Brandsen
- Racing Club de Avellaneda
- Dock Sud

Senior career*
Years	Team	Apps	(Gls)
1942–1957	River Plate	365	(103)
1957–1958	Estudiantes	9	(0)

International career
1945–1952	Argentina	27	(10)
- * Club domestic league appearances and goals as of June 2007

Félix Loustau (Spanish pronunciation: [lusˈto]) (25 December 1922 – 5 January 2003) was an Argentine professional footballer who was a key player on the River Plate squad known as La Máquina. He usually played as an outside left and is widely regarded as one of the best wingers who played in the Argentine Primera Division and in the Argentina national team.

The peak of his career was during the Second World War, so his international career was very limited. Nevertheless, he played 28 times for Argentina scoring ten goals and he won the Copa América three times in 1945, 1946 and 1947.

== Honours ==
River Plate

- Argentine Primera División: 1942, 1945, 1947, 1952, 1953, 1955, 1956, 1957
- Copa Ibarguren: 1942, 1952
- Copa Aldao: 1941, 1945, 1947

Argentina

- Copa América: 1945, 1946, 1947
