= Bernardo Gandulla =

Argentine footballer and coach

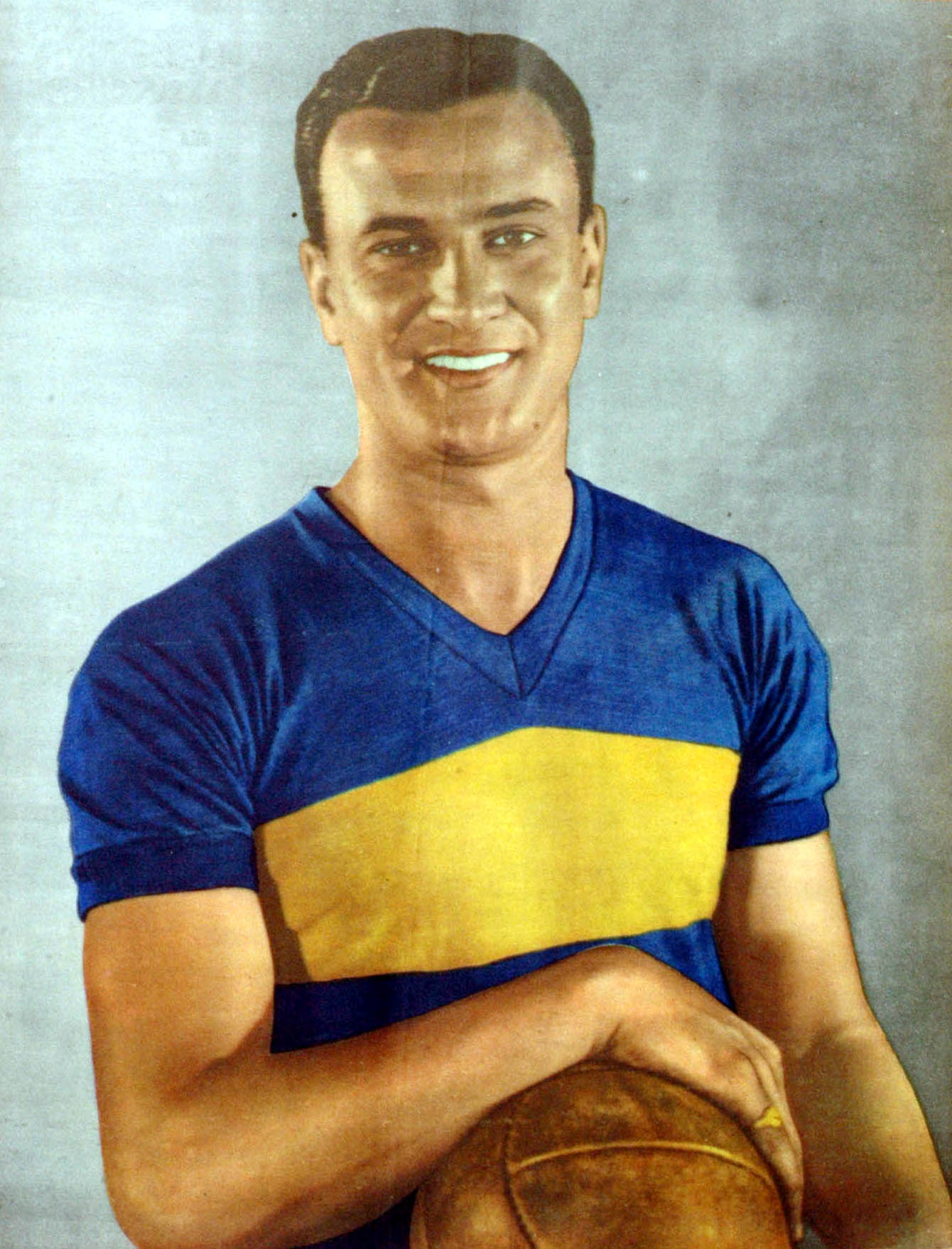
- Gandulla when playing for Boca Juniors in 1940.

Personal information
- Full name: Bernardo José Gandulla
- Date of birth: 1 March 1916
- Place of birth: Buenos Aires, Argentina
- Date of death: 6 July 1999 (aged 83)
- Place of death: Buenos Aires, Argentina
- Position: Forward

Senior career*
Years	Team	Apps	(Gls)
1934–1939	Ferro Carril Oeste		
1939	Vasco		
1940–1943	Boca Juniors	57	(26)
1944–1946	Ferro Carril Oeste		
1947–1948	Atlanta		

International career
1940	Argentina	1	(0)

Managerial career
- 1953: Defensores de Belgrano
- 1957–1958: Boca Juniors
- * Club domestic league appearances and goals

Bernardo José Gandulla, better known as Bernardo Gandulla (1 March 1916 – 6 July 1999) was an Argentine football forward and head coach. He died in Buenos Aires from respiratory problems.

== Career ==
=== Playing career ===
Born in Buenos Aires, Bernardo Gandulla defended Ferro Carril Oeste from 1934 to 1939. He moved to Brazilian club Vasco in 1939, but played few games for the team. Gandulla returned to Argentina in 1940 to play for Boca Juniors. He played 57 Argentine Primera División games and scored 26 goals for the club, winning the competition in 1940 and 1943. He returned to Ferro Carril Oeste in 1944, leaving the club in 1946. Gandulla played for Atlanta from 1947 to 1948.

=== Coaching career ===
Gandulla was Defensores de Belgrano's head coach in 1953, winning the Primera División C in that season. He was Boca Juniors' head coach from 1957 to 1958.

== Ball boy ==
He is well known in Brazil as his surname originated the term used in the country for the ball boy, which is gandula. Gandulla was part of Vasco's squad, but as he spent most of his time on the bench, he retrieved the balls during the games of his club.

== Titles ==
=== Player ===
Boca Juniors

- Primera División: 1940, 1943

=== Head coach ===
Defensores de Belgrano

- Primera C: 1953
