= 1952 Argentine Primera División =

61st season of top-tier football league in Argentina

Primera División
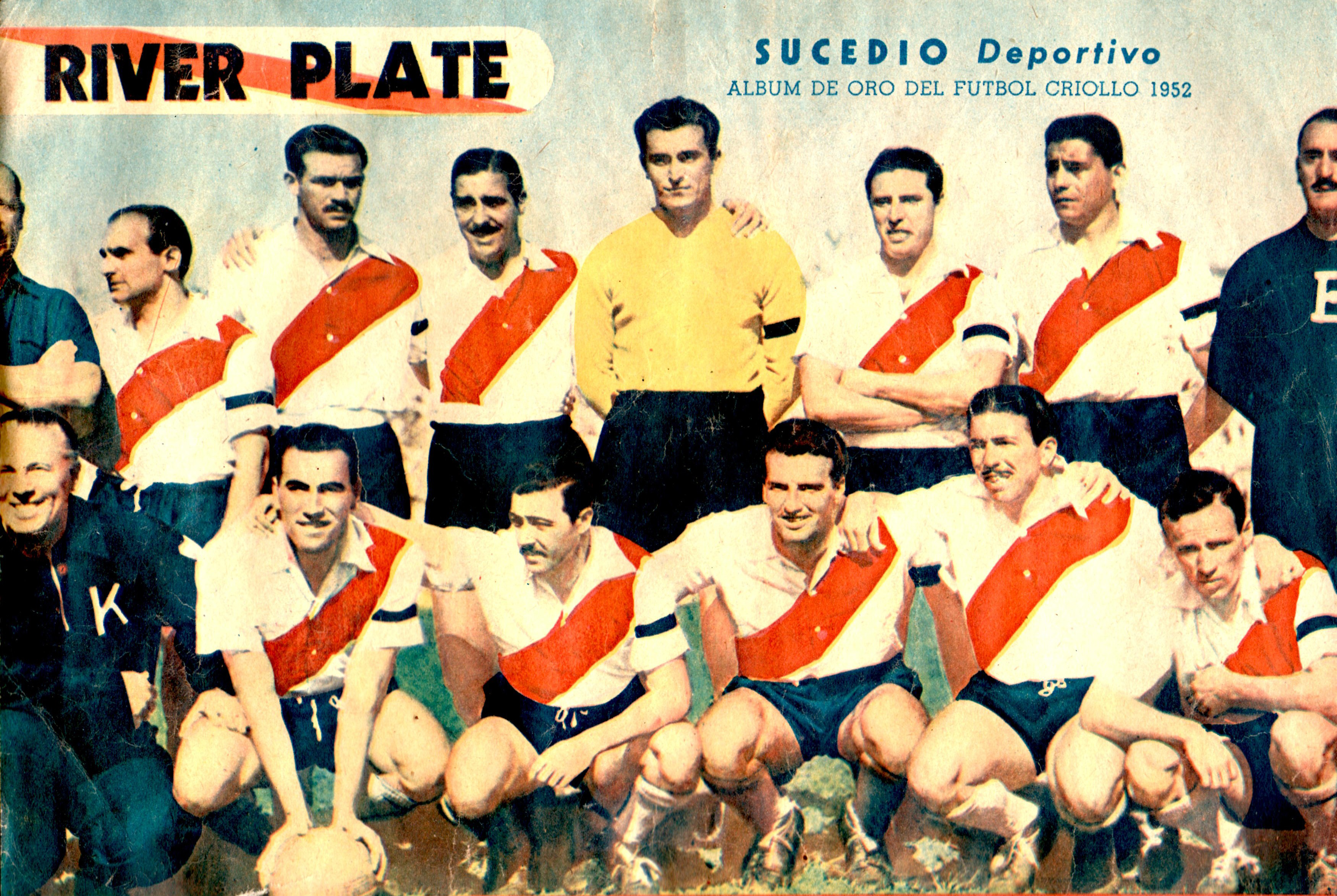
- River Plate, champions
- Season: 1952
- Champions: River Plate (10th title)
- Promoted: Rosario Central
- Relegated: Atlanta
- Top goalscorer: (Argentina) Eduardo Ricagni (28 goals)

The 1952 Argentine Primera División was the 61st season of top-flight football in Argentina. The season began on April 6 and ended on November 29.

Rosario Central returned to Primera while Atlanta was relegated. River Plate won its 10th league title.

== League standings ==
Pos	Team	Pld	W	D	L	GF	GA	GD	Pts
1	River Plate	30	17	6	7	65	48	+17	40
2	Racing	30	13	13	4	50	33	+17	39
3	Independiente	30	13	9	8	72	58	+14	35
3	Huracán	30	14	7	9	59	49	+10	35
5	Banfield	30	13	7	10	54	44	+10	33
6	Vélez Sársfield	30	10	12	8	54	44	+10	32
6	Lanús	30	12	8	10	54	50	+4	32
6	San Lorenzo	30	13	6	11	45	47	−2	32
9	Platense	30	12	7	11	67	61	+6	31
10	Boca Juniors	30	11	8	11	50	39	+11	30
11	Chacarita Juniors	30	12	5	13	48	48	0	29
12	Estudiantes (LP)	30	10	8	12	58	54	+4	28
13	Rosario Central	30	10	7	13	48	62	−14	27
14	Ferro Carril Oeste	30	9	6	15	38	57	−19	24
15	Newell's Old Boys	30	6	11	13	34	55	−21	23
16	Atlanta	30	2	6	22	52	99	−47	10
