= Adolfo Pedernera =

Argentine footballer (1918–1995)

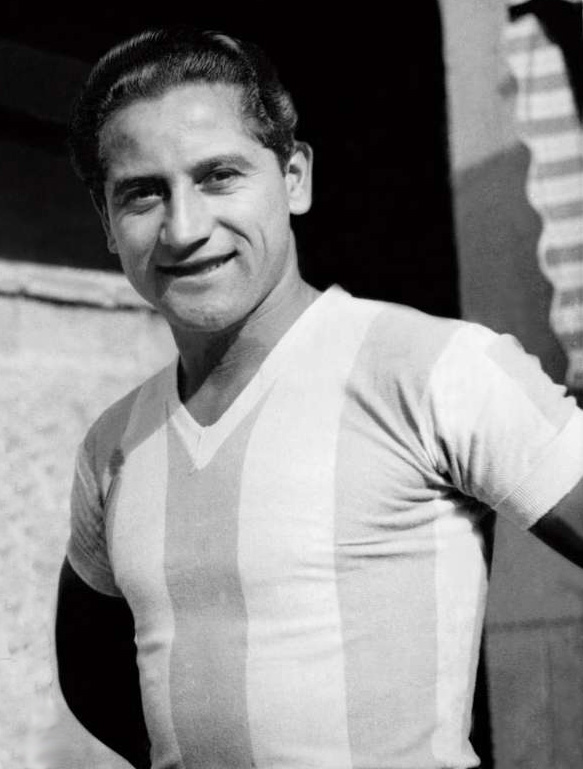
- Pedernera with the Argentina national team, c. 1945

Personal information
- Date of birth: 15 November 1918
- Place of birth: Avellaneda, Argentina
- Date of death: 12 May 1995 (aged 76)
- Place of death: Avellaneda, Argentina
- Position: Inside forward

Youth career
- 1932: Huracán
- 1933–1934: River Plate

Senior career*
Years	Team	Apps	(Gls)
1935–1946	River Plate	278	(131)
1947	Atlanta	28	(4)
1948–1949	Huracán	20	(2)
1949–1954	Millonarios	81	(33)
1954–1955	Huracán	10	(0)
Total		417	(170)

International career
1940–1946	Argentina	21	(7)

Managerial career
- 1951–1953: Millonarios (player-manager)
- 1954: Huracán (player-manager)
- 1955: Nacional
- 1955: Gimnasia y Esgrima LP
- 1955–1956: Huracán
- 1957: Independiente
- 1960–1961: América de Cali
- 1961–1962: Colombia
- 1962: Gimnasia y Esgrima LP
- 1963–1964: Boca Juniors
- 1966–1967: Boca Juniors
- 1968: Quilmes
- 1969: Independiente
- 1969: Argentina
- 1970: Huracán
- 1975: Talleres (Córdoba)
- 1976: Banfield
- 1977: América de Cali
- 1978: San Lorenzo
- * Club domestic league appearances and goals

Adolfo Alfredo Pedernera (15 November 1918 – 12 May 1995) was an Argentine football player and coach. Nicknamed "El Maestro" ("The Teacher"), he was widely considered to be one of the best world football players in the 1940s and one of the greatest Argentine players of all time. Pedernera was the natural conductor of both the famous River Plate team known as La Máquina ("The Machine"), with whom he won several Argentine and South American titles, and the Millonarios team called Ballet Azul ("Blue Ballet") that won the Small Club World Cup in 1953 among many others Colombian titles.

Pedernera's play with the Argentina national team, helped win the Copa América in 1941 and 1946, the latter tournament being named the Best Player. He also was elected the 12th-best South American footballer of the 20th century in a poll by the IFFHS in 2000, and his name appears in the list of the 100 greatest all time footballers selected from the magazine FourFourTwo in 2017, in which he holds the 58th place.

Pedernera usually played as an inside forward and was renowned for his technique and ability to create chances for other players, whilst also being a prominent goalscorer.

== Early career ==
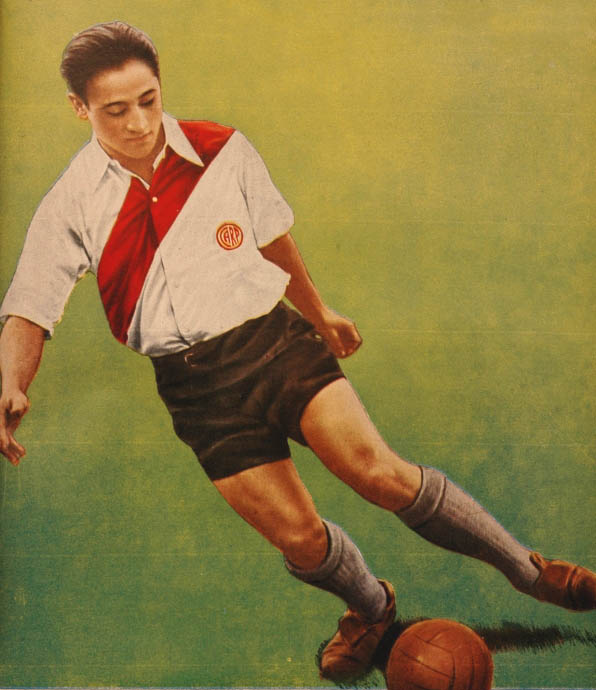
A young Pedernera with River Plate in 1937

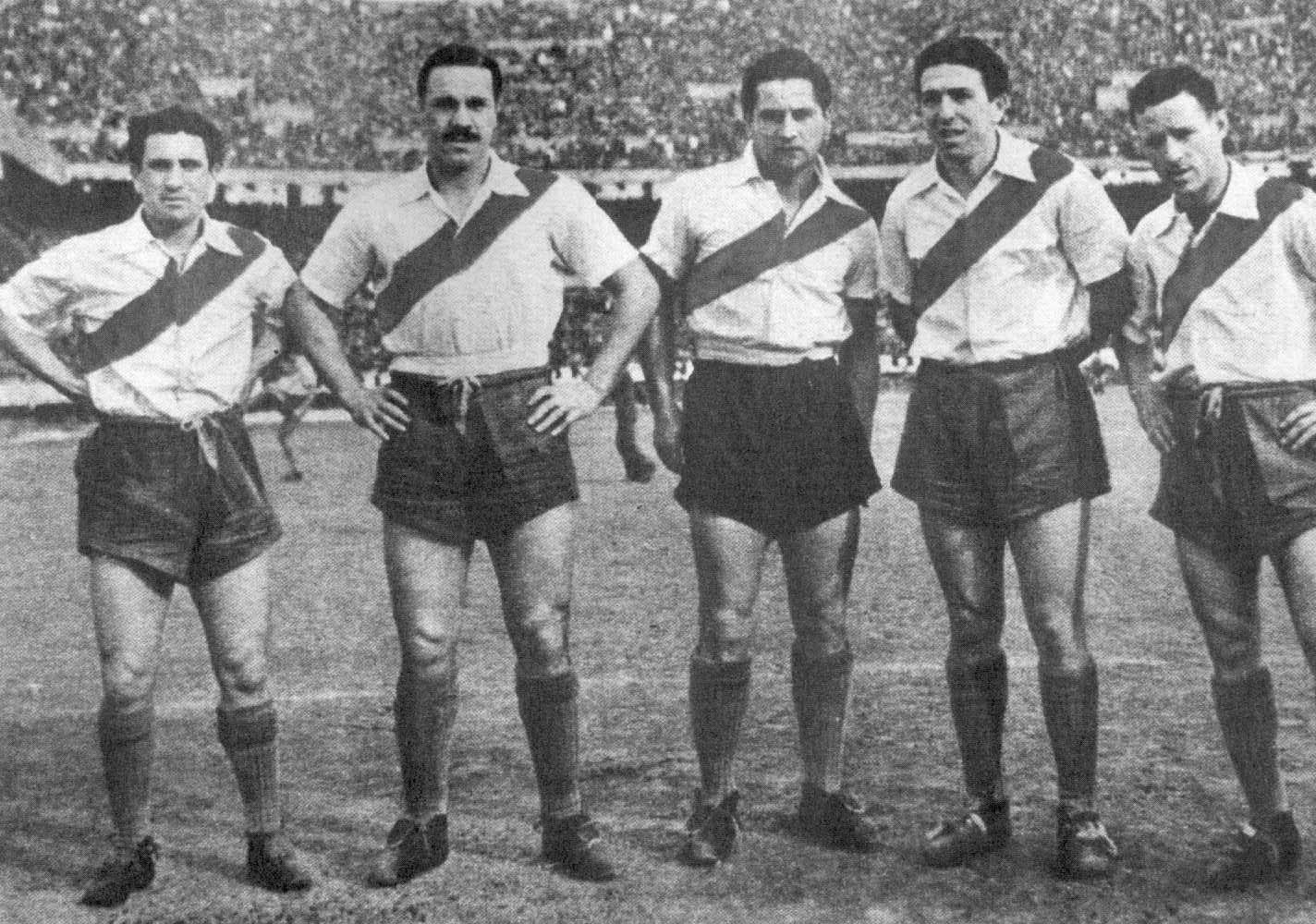
Pedernera (third from left) as part of La Máquina in 1941

As an adolescent, Pedernera displayed a talent for football. The first club he joined was Cruceros de la Plata, but he soon joined the professional Club Atlético Huracán. In 1933, he joined the Club Atlético River Plate. In 1935, at the age of 16, he debuted with this club.

During his time at River Plate he was part of five Primera División winning squads in 1936, 1937, 1941, 1942 and 1945.

With the Argentina national team he won the Copa America 1941 and 1946.

The Second World War kept Pedernera away from the game as he could not participate in a World Cup, but afterwards, his career continued to progress. Still with the Club Atlético River Plate, he played with the likes of Ángel Labruna, José Manuel Moreno, Félix Loustau, and Juan Carlos Muñoz. He also collaborated with Hugo Reyes, Antonio El Maestrico Báez, Néstor Rossi, and Alfredo Di Stéfano who he would later be teammates with them for CD Los Millonarios in Colombia, but first, in 1947, he was offered a million pesos to play for Atlanta of Buenos Aires.

Pedernera's time with Atlanta was short. After the club was relegated for the first time, he returned in 1948 to Huracán where he started his career. However, Carlos Aldabe, the trainer of Millonarios, visited Pedernera in Buenos Aires and convinced him to come to Bogotá, Colombia. There, Pedernera joined the Millonarios on 8 June 1949. He arrived in Bogotá on 10 June and was greeted at the Aeropuerto de Techo by 5,000 fans transported by 200 cars and 25 buses.

== Later career ==
Pedernera settled in the north of Bogotá after being received into the club. On 11 June 1949, he attended his first game with the Millonarios, in which they defeated the Club Atlético Municipal (now the Atlético Nacional) with a score of 6–0. On 25 June, Pedernera played for the first time with the club, helping them defeat the Club Deportes Caldas with a score of 3–0. The press of Bogotá received Pedernera well and commented the next day that "El Maestro" ("The Teacher") was "a phenomenon, an artist, a master of passing, and a show of intelligence. After the debut of El Maestro, everything is possible."

Along with Alfredo Di Stéfano and Nestor Rossi, Pedernera helped the Millonarios to their Colombian championship title in 1949. According to Di Stéfano, the team played with the "5 and dance" strategy, in which they would try to not humiliate their opponents by scoring when they were leading by five goals. This strategy was employed in nine consecutive victories. In championship play, Pedernera scored the two decisive goals in the championship deciding play-off matches against Deportivo Cali in 1949.

After Carlos Aldabe retired as coach from Millonarios Pedernera took over as player-manager and was in this position instrumental in winning the three consecutive championships from 1951 to 1953 and the Copa Colombia of 1953.

In this era the Millonarios defeated such other strong teams at the time as Argentina's Huracán, Bolivia's Bolívar, Austria's Rapid Wien, and even his old team, Argentina's River Plate, which had won Primera División championships in 1952 and 1953.

In March 1952, when Pedernera was 33 years old, he was part of the Millonarios tour of Europe. On this trip, they achieved an outstanding win over Real Madrid 4–2 at Santiago Bernabéu Stadium. The Spanish club asked for a rematch, playing two games else that were also won by Millonarios.

Pedernera also led his team to victory in the Small Club World Cup ("Pequeña Copa del Mundo", an international club tournament held in Venezuela) in 1953. He, along with Don Alfonso and Mauro Mórtola, were placed on a list of noted Millonarios players. The team credits him with establishing their mark on Colombia football.

In 1954, the Lima Pact forced all "illegal" players to return to their clubs of origin, so Pedernera returned briefly to Huracán.

== Coaching career ==
In later years Pedernera also coached Nacional in Uruguay, Gimnasia y Esgrima (LP), Huracán, Independiente, Boca Juniors, América de Cali and River Plate

Pedernera also coached Colombia and Argentina national teams. He is remembered in Colombia for helping the national team qualify for its first FIFA World Cup, the 1962 edition in Chile, where Colombia had a good participation. On the other hand, under his coaching Argentina failed to qualify to the 1970 World Cup when the team tied 2–2 with Peru in La Bombonera. This was the first time that Argentina failed to qualify to a World Cup tournament.

== Later years ==
In 1993, Pedernera published his autobiography named "El fútbol que viví ... y que yo siento" (the football I lived ... and I feel), assisted by journalist Alejandro Yebra.

In 1994, he was reunited for the last time with his lifelong friends Alfredo Di Stéfano and Pipo Rossi at the Feria Internacional del Libro in Bogotá. Pedernera died the next year.

== Honours ==
=== Player ===
River Plate

- Primera División Argentina: 1936, 1937, 1941, 1942, 1945
- Copa Ibarguren: 1937, 1941, 1942
- Copa Adrián C. Escobar: 1941
- Copa Aldao: 1936, 1937, 1941, 1945

Millonarios

- Categoría Primera A: 1949, 1951, 1952, 1953
- Copa Colombia: 1953
- Small Club World Cup: 1953

Argentina

- Copa América: 1941, 1945, 1946

Individual

- Copa América Best Player: 1946
- IFFHS Argentina All Times Dream Team (Team C): 2021
