= 1920 Copa Aldao =

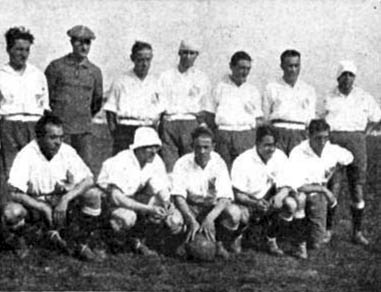
- Nacional, champions
- Event: Copa Aldao
| Boca Juniors | Nacional |
| (Argentina) | (Uruguay) |
| 1 | 2 |
- Date: 20 November 1921
- Venue: Sportivo Barracas, Buenos Aires
- Referee: Manuel Louzao (Argentina)

The 1920 Copa Aldao was the final match to decide the winner of the Copa Aldao, the sixth edition of the international competition organised by the Argentine and Uruguayan Associations together. The final was contested by the same teams than the previous edition, Uruguayan Nacional and Argentine Boca Juniors.

In the match, played at Estadio Sportivo Barracas in Buenos Aires on November 20, 1921, Nacional beat Boca Juniors 2–1, winning its third (and last) Copa Aldao trophy.

== Qualified teams ==
| Team | Qualification | Previous final app. |
|---|---|---|
| (Argentina) Boca Juniors | 1920 Primera División champions | 1 (1919) |
| (Uruguay) Nacional | 1920 Primera División champions | 3 (**1916**, 1917, **1919**) |

- **Bold** indicates winning years

== Venue ==
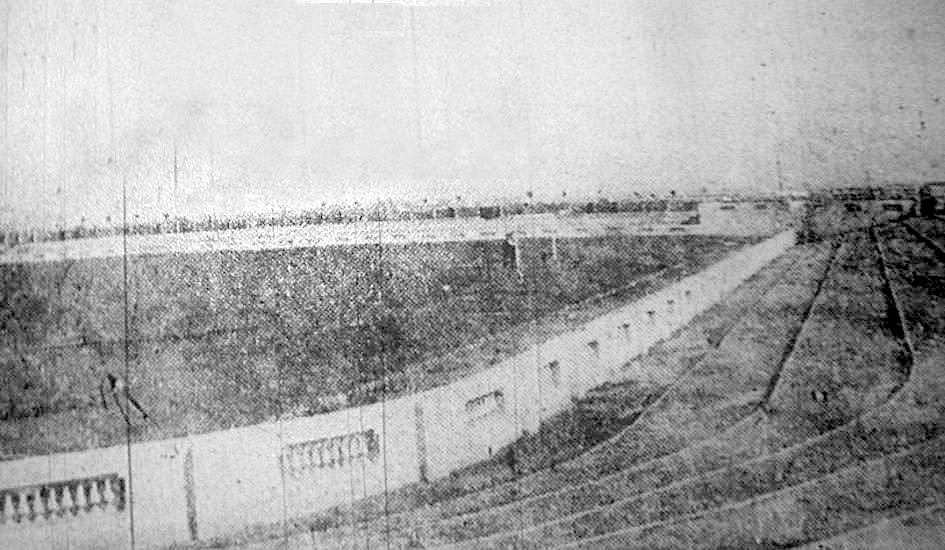
Sportivo Barracas, venue of the final

== Match ==
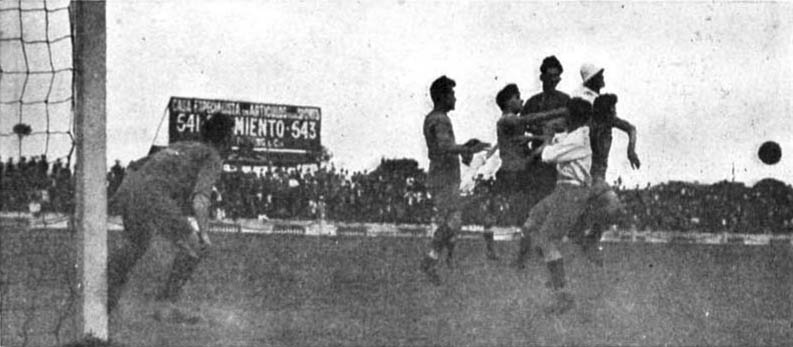
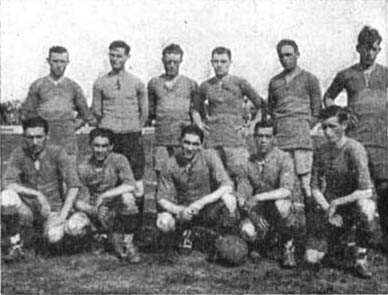
(left): A moment of the match; (right): Boca Juniors team

All the goals came in the second half. It was Boca Juniors the team that opened the score with winger Pedro Calomino on 55 minutes.

Nevertheless, with 15 minutes left, Nacional scored two goals that allowed the squad to win their third Aldao Cup trophy, thanks to Ángel Romano and goalkeeper Andrés Mazali who, as a curious fact, played as forward in this match.

=== Details ===
1920 Copa Aldao
20 November 1921

| Boca Juniors (Argentina) | 1–2 | (Uruguay) Nacional |
|---|---|---|
| Calomino 55' | Report | Mazali 75'; Romano 82' |

Estadio Sportivo Barracas, Buenos Aires
Referee: Manuel Louzao (Argentina)

| **Boca Juniors** | **Nacional** |

| GK | (Argentina) Américo Tesoriere |
| DF | (Argentina) Juan Anglese |
| DF | (Argentina) Victorio Capelletti |
| MF | (Argentina) José A. López |
| MF | (Argentina) Mario Busso |
| MF | (Argentina) Alfredo Elli |
| FW | (Argentina) Pedro Calomino |
| FW | (Argentina) Pablo Bozzo |
| FW | (Argentina) Alfredo Martín |
| FW | (Argentina) Felipe Galíndez |
| FW | (Argentina) Marcelino Martínez |

| GK | (Uruguay) Raúl Paravis |
| DF | (Uruguay) Antonio Urdinarán |
| DF | (Uruguay) Alfredo Foglino |
| MF | (Uruguay) Rogelio Naguil |
| MF | (Uruguay) Alfredo Zibechi |
| MF | (Uruguay) José Vanzzino |
| FW | (Uruguay) Ángel Romano |
| FW | (Uruguay) Héctor Scarone |
| FW | (Uruguay) Santos Urdinarán |
| FW | (Uruguay) Andrés Mazali |
| FW | (Uruguay) Pascual Somma |
