= Atilio García =

Uruguayan footballer (1914–1973)

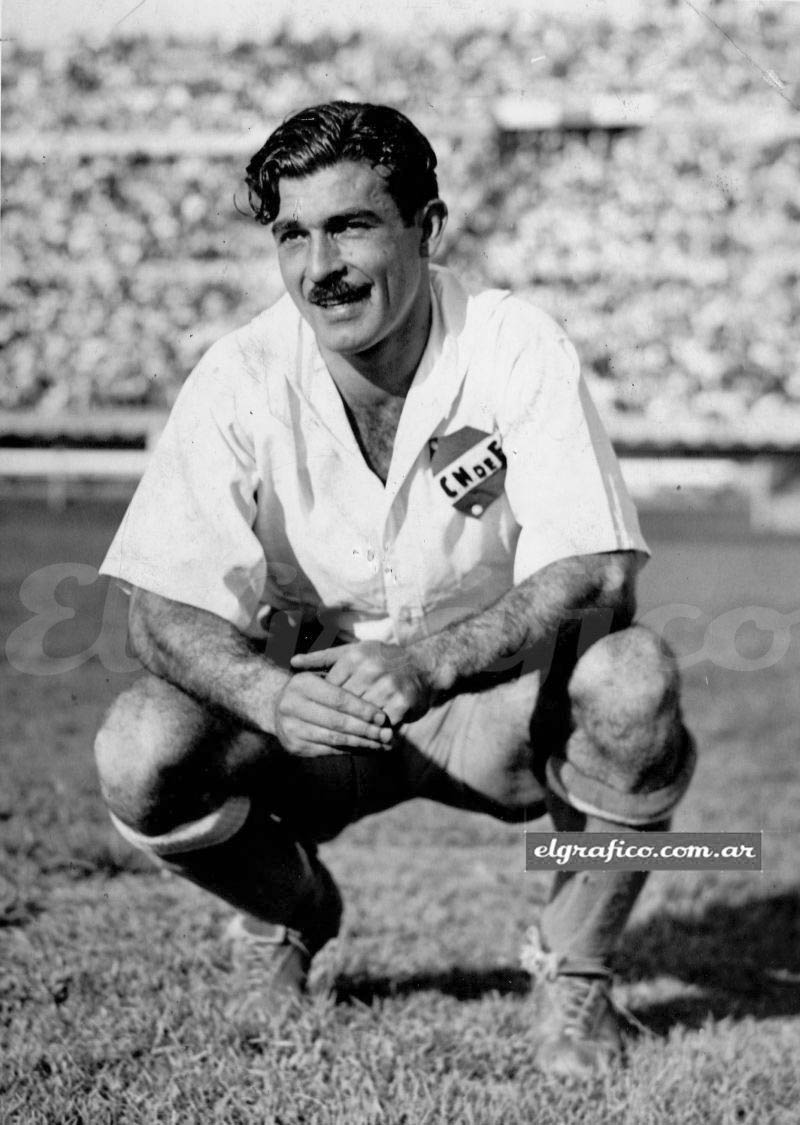
- García during his tenure in Nacional

Personal information
- Full name: Atilio Ceferino García Pérez
- Date of birth: 26 August 1914
- Place of birth: Junín, Buenos Aires, Argentina
- Date of death: 12 December 1973 (aged 59)
- Place of death: Montevideo, Uruguay
- Position: Striker

Youth career
- Club Atlético Moreno

Senior career*
Years	Team	Apps	(Gls)
1936	Platense	23	(12)
1937	Boca Juniors	7	(6)
1938–1951	Nacional	210	(208)
1952	Racing Montevideo		
1953	Miramar Misiones		

International career
1945	Uruguay	5	(5)
- * Club domestic league appearances and goals

Atilio Ceferino García Pérez (26 August 1914 – 12 December 1973) was an Argentine-born Uruguayan naturalized footballer who played as a forward.

García is the top goal scorer in the history of Uruguayan football with 466 goals with 330 scored in official tournaments within 329 matches. and the second highest goal scorer in the history of the Uruguayan Primera División with 208 goals scored in 210 matches, which also converted him in to the top goal scorer of the Uruguayan championship playing for the same club. He is also the top scorer in the history of Uruguayan Clásico with 35 goals. He played for Nacional between 1938 and 1951.

García also has the record of being top scorer in most Uruguayan Primera División seasons, with 8 (7 of them consecutively).

== Career ==
García started his careera at Club Atlético Moreno, then joining to Platense after a suggestion from Raúl Pajoni, a prominent player of El Calamar for those years. García played in Platense from 1931 to 1936, scoring 12 goals in 23 matches. Due to his good performances in reserve matches, Boca Juniors hired him for the 1937 season, although García only played 7 matches for Boca Juniors, scoring 6 goals. It would be his last Argentine team before joining Nacional.

With Nacional he set a number of national records, including; Most topscorer awards, most consecutive top scorer awards, most goals against C.A. Peñarol and the most goals against Peñarol in a single game. During his time at Nacional the club won 25 titles, including eight championships. García was the top scorer in the league on eight occasions.

After leaving Nacional he had single seasons with Racing Club de Montevideo and Miramar Misiones.

García continued to live in Uruguay after his retirement in 1953. He died in Montevideo in 1973.

== Career statistics ==
=== International ===
Appearances and goals by national team and year
National team	Year	Apps	Goals
Uruguay	1945	5	5
Total		5	5

Scores and results list Uruguay's goal tally first, score column indicates score after each García goal.

List of international goals scored by Atilio García
No.	Date	Venue	Opponent	Score	Result	Competition
1	24 January 1945	Estadio Nacional, Santiago, Chile	Ecuador	1–0	5–1	1945 South American Championship
2	24 January 1945	Estadio Nacional, Santiago, Chile	Ecuador	3–1	5–1	1945 South American Championship
3	24 January 1945	Estadio Nacional, Santiago, Chile	Ecuador	5–1	5–1	1945 South American Championship
4	28 January 1945	Estadio Nacional, Santiago, Chile	Colombia	1–0	7–0	1945 South American Championship
5	28 January 1945	Estadio Nacional, Santiago, Chile	Colombia	7–0	7–0	1945 South American Championship

== Honours ==
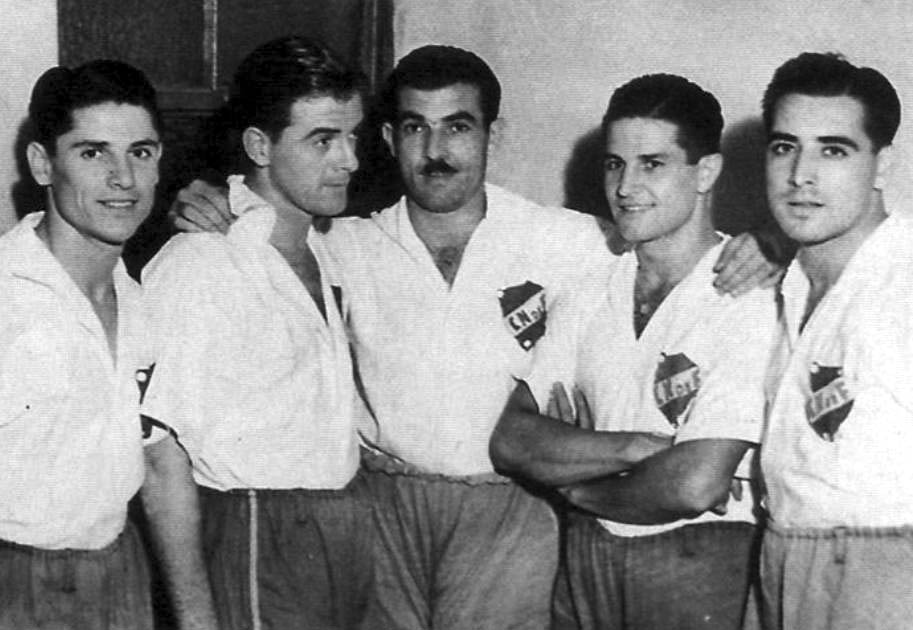
García with the rest of Nacional forwards, with whom he won 5 consecutive championships (1939–43).

- Primera División (8): 1939, 1940, 1941, 1942, 1943, 1946, 1947, 1950
- Torneo de Honor (8): 1938, 1939, 1940, 1941, 1942, 1943, 1946, 1948
- Campeonato Nocturno Rioplatense (1): 1938
- C. C. Grandes del Río de la Plata (1): 1938
- Copa Aldao (3): 1940, 1942, 1946
- Torneo Competencia (3): 1942, 1945, 1948
- Copa del Atlántico (1): 1947

=== Top scorer statistics ===
Season	Club	Goals
1938	Nacional	20
1939	Nacional	22
1940	Nacional	18
1941	Nacional	23
1942	Nacional	19
1943	Nacional	18
1944	Nacional	21
1946	Nacional	21

== Facts ==
- Atilio Ceferino García has a stand in the Estadio Gran Parque Central named in his honour.
- On 8 December 1940 García scored a record 4 goals in a 5–1 victory over Peñarol.
- García scored a total of 35 goals against Peñarol, a record that may never be surpassed.
- García was topscorer in Uruguay in seven consecutive seasons between 1938 and 1944.
- Fernando Morena is the only player to have scored more goals than García in the Uruguayan league, with 230.
- García is the top scorer in the history of Club Nacional de Football, with 464 goals in 435 games in all competitions.
