= Roberto Porta =

Uruguayan footballer (1913-1984)

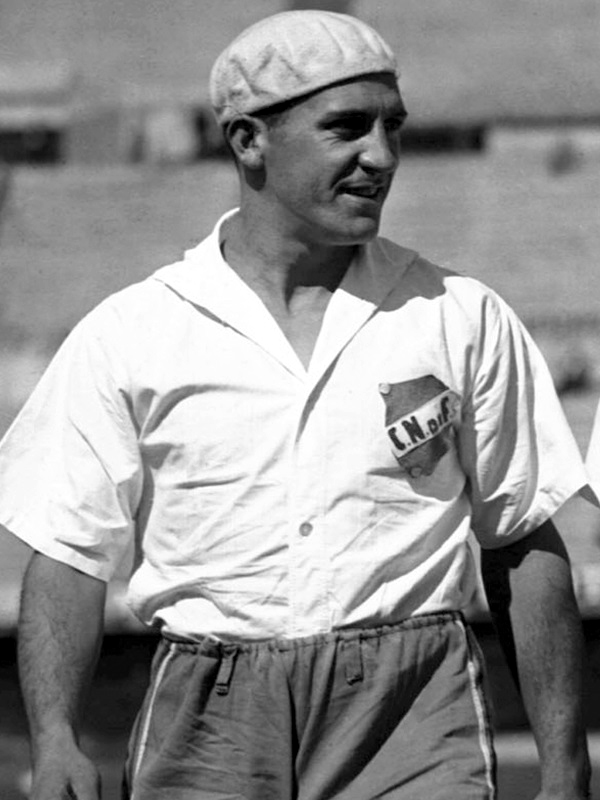
- Porta with Nacional

Personal information
- Full name: Roberto Porta
- Date of birth: 7 June 1913
- Place of birth: Montevideo, Uruguay
- Date of death: 2 January 1984 (aged 70)
- Place of death: Buenos Aires, Argentina
- Position: Forward

Senior career*
Years	Team	Apps	(Gls)
1930–1931	Nacional	3	(1)
1931–1934	Independiente	96	(19)
1934–1936	Internazionale	53	(12)
1936–1946	Nacional	307	(133)
Total		459	(165)

International career
1935	Italy	1	(0)
1937–1945	Uruguay	34	(14)

Managerial career
- 1973–1974: Uruguay
Medal record
Men's football
Representing Italy and Uruguay
Central European International Cup
Gold medal – first place	1933-35 Central European International Cup
South American Championship
Silver medal – second place	1939 Peru
South American Championship
Silver medal – second place	1941 Chile
South American Championship
Gold medal – first place	1942 Uruguay
- * Club domestic league appearances and goals

Roberto Porta (Italian pronunciation: [roˈbɛrto ˈpɔrta]; 7 June 1913 – 2 January 1984) was a Uruguayan–Italian footballer who played as a forward.

During his club career he played for Nacional (Uruguay), Inter (Italy) and Independiente (Argentina). He earned 33 caps and scored 13 goals for the Uruguay national football team from 1937 to 1945, and also played 1 match for the Italy national football team in 1935, thereby being part of the squad that won the 1933–35 Central European International Cup.

He was the Uruguay national team's coach at the 1974 FIFA World Cup.

== Honours ==
=== International ===
Italy

- Central European International Cup: 1933-35

Uruguay

- South American Championship: 1942
- South American Championship: Runner-up 1939, 1941
