= 1919 Copa Aldao =

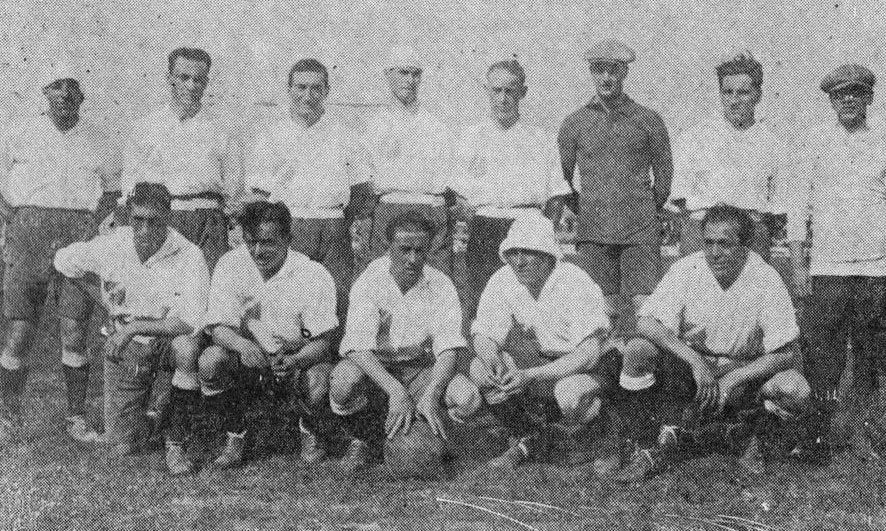
- Team of Nacional, winners
- Event: Copa Aldao
Nacional	Boca Juniors
(Uruguay)	(Argentina)
3	0
- Date: 16 May 1920
- Venue: Parque Central, Montevideo
- Referee: Martín Aphesteguy (Uruguay)

The 1919 Copa Aldao was the final match to decide the winner of the Copa Aldao, the fifth edition of the international competition organised by the Argentine and Uruguayan Associations together. The final was contested by Uruguayan Nacional and Argentine Boca Juniors.

In the match, played at Estadio Gran Parque Central in Montevideo on May 16, 1920, Nacional beat Boca Juniors 3–0, winning its second Copa Aldao trophy.

== Qualified teams ==
Team	Qualification	Previous final app.
(Uruguay) Nacional	1919 Primera División champions	2 (**1916**, 1917)
(Argentina) Boca Juniors	1919 Primera División champions	(none)

- **Bold** indicates winning years

== Overview ==
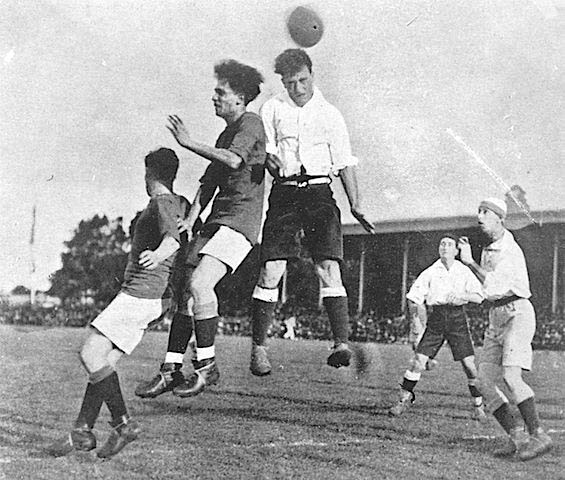
A moment of the match held in Gran Parque Central

It was the first Copa Aldao final contested by Boca Juniors as champion of Primera División, while Nacional played its third final having been winner of the 2nd. edition played in 1916. 1919 was one of the most successful seasons in the history of Boca Juniors so the club won the Copa de Competencia Jockey Club, Copa Ibarguren, and international Tie Cup (won to Nacional). Nevertheless, this edition of Copa Aldao would be the only final lost by Boca Juniors in the season.

On 15 minutes, Héctor Scarone headed to score the first goal. Only five minutes later, Ángel Romano scored another goal for Nacional, and Pascual Somma scored the third goal on 61 minutes. As a curious fact, Nacional played almost the entire game with 10 players due to Rogelio Naguil left the field on 22 after being injured (substitutions were not allowed on those times).

With this win over Boca Juniors, Uruguayan side Nacional achieved its second Copa Aldao trophy.

== Match details ==
1919 Copa Aldao
16 May 1920

Nacional (Uruguay)	3–0	(Argentina) Boca Juniors
Scarone 21'; Romano 26'; Somma 61'	Report

Parque Central, Montevideo
Referee: Martín Aphesteguy (Uruguay)

**Nacional**	**Boca Juniors**

GK	(Uruguay) Andrés Mazali
DF	(Uruguay) Antonio Urdinarán
DF	(Uruguay) Alfredo Foglino
MF	(Uruguay) Rogelio Naguil	(substituted off) 15'
MF	(Uruguay) Alfredo Zibechi
MF	(Uruguay) José Vanzzino
FW	(Uruguay) Pascual Somma
FW	(Uruguay) Ángel Romano
FW	(Uruguay) Santos Urdinarán
FW	(Uruguay) Héctor Scarone
FW	(Uruguay) Rodolfo Marán

GK	(Argentina) Américo Tesoriere
DF	(Argentina) Antonio Cortella
DF	(Argentina) José Ortega
MF	(Argentina) José A. López
MF	(Argentina) Mario Busso
MF	(Argentina) Alfredo Elli
FW	(Argentina) Pedro Calomino
FW	(Uruguay) Zoilo Canavery
FW	(Argentina) Alfredo Garasini
FW	(Argentina) Alberto Martín
FW	(Argentina) Pedro Miranda

Notes

Injured player; substitutions were not allowed in those times
