= List of River Plate seasons =

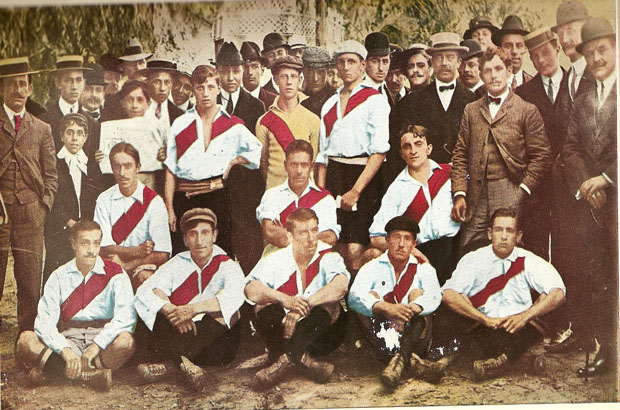
River Plate's first team that gained promotion to the 1909 Primera División

Club Atlético River Plate is an Argentine professional football club based in Buenos Aires, who currently play in the Argentine Primera División. The club was formed in 1901, as a result of the merging of football clubs Santa Rosa and La Rosales. River Plate won their first Primera División title in 1920; since then, the club has won a further 37 league titles, along with 16 national cups. At international level, they have been crowned champions of South American football on four occasions, winning the Copa Libertadores in 1986, 1996, 2015 and 2018, and have also won a Worldwide thropy, the 1986 Intercontinental Cup.

As of the end of the 2025 season, River Plate have spent 118 seasons in the top tier of the Argentine football league system, four in the second and one in the third. The table details the team's achievements and the top goalscorer in senior first-team competitions from their first in the Tercera División during the 1905 season to the end of the most recently completed season.

== Key ==
- Primera División – Argentina's top football league, established in 1891
- Segunda División – Comprises two second tier tournaments of Argentine football, the Segunda División and the Primera B Nacional
- Tercera División – The third tier of Argentine football

Key to colours and symbols
1st or W	Winners
2nd or RU	Runners-up
3rd	Third place
↑	Promoted
↓	Relegated
♦	Top scorer in division

Key to league record
Pld	Matches played
W	Matches won
D	Matches drawn
L	Matches lost
GF	Goals scored
GA	Goals against
Pts	Points
Pos	Final position

Key to cup record
S1	First stage
S2	Second stage
GS	Group stage
R32	Round of 32
R16	Round of 16
QF	Quarter-finals
SF	Semi-finals

== Seasons ==
Correct as of the end of the 2025 season.

River Plate seasons
Season	League									National cups		AFA-AUF / South America / FIFA		Top scorer(s)	
Season	League	Pld	W	D	L	GF	GA	Pts	Pos	Competition	Result	Competition	Result	Player(s)	Goals
1905	Tercera División	14	4	1	9	18	41	7	7th	Copa El Diario	QF	—	—	Eduardo Rolón	3
1906	Segunda División	12	4	0	8	9	24	8	S1	Copa Bullrich	R16	—	—	Bernardo Messina	2
1907	Segunda División	18	13	3	3	24	24	29	RU	Copa Bullrich	S1	—	—	Juan Ramón Peña	4
1908	Segunda División	18	15	1	2	66	15	31	W	Copa Bullrich	QF	—	—	Arturo Chiappe Elías Fernández	4
1909	Primera División	18	11	2	5	35	26	24	2nd	Copa Competencia JC Copa de Honor MCBA	QF SF	—	—	Hernán Rodríguez	13
1910	Primera División	16	4	4	8	27	37	12	7th	Copa Competencia JC Copa de Honor MCBA	S1 AB (Note: The cup was abandoned in the semi-finals because the international final against the Uruguayan team had to be cancelled.)	—	—	Arturo Prandoni	14
1911	Primera División	16	6	4	6	22	31	16	5th	Copa Competencia JC Copa de Honor MCBA	S1 S1	—	—	Adriano Bergogne	8
1912	Primera División	10	3	1	6	8	23	7	6th	Copa Competencia JC Copa de Honor MCBA	S1 S1	—	—	Pascual Polimeni Alberto Penney	4
1913	Primera División	14	10	4	0	30	7	24	3rd	Copa Competencia JC Copa de Honor MCBA	S1 S1	—	—	Alberto Penney	12
1914	Primera División	12	6	2	4	15	12	14	5th	Copa Competencia JC	W	Tie Cup	W	Alberto Penney	8
1915	Primera División	24	16	6	2	58	17	38	3rd	Copa Competencia JC Copa de Honor MCBA	SF S2	—	—	Antonio Ameal Pereyra	11
1916	Primera División	21	10	9	2	27	10	29	3rd	Copa Competencia JC Copa de Honor MCBA	SF S1	—	—	Nicolás Rofrano	9
1917	Primera División	20	12	6	2	35	14	30	2nd	Copa Competencia JC Copa de Honor MCBA	S2 RU	—	—	Francisco Taggino	18
1918	Primera División	19	9	7	3	30	17	25	2nd	Copa Competencia JC Copa de Honor MCBA	RU S2	—	—	José Laiolo	16
1919	Primera División	13	6	4	3	16	11	16	3rd	Copa Competencia JC	R16	—	—	José Laiolo	8
1920	Primera División	34	25	6	3	70	22	56	1st	Copa Competencia AA	S2	—	—	Nicolás Rofrano	13
1921	Primera División	38	25	4	9	69	30	54	2nd	—	—	—	—	Fausto Lucarelli	22
1922	Primera División	40	25	11	4	58	18	61	2nd	—	—	—	—	Fausto Lucarelli Jerónimo Uriarte	9
1923	Primera División	20	14	3	3	29	12	31	3rd	—	—	—	—	Pascual Licciardi	9
1924	Primera División	23	13	5	5	30	20	31	5th	Copa Competencia AA	SF	—	—	Pascual Licciardi	13
1925	Primera División	24	7	6	11	21	24	20	17th	Copa Competencia AA	SF	—	—	Pascual Licciardi Enrique Gainzarain	6
1926	Primera División	25	10	4	11	32	24	24	11th	Copa Competencia AA	S2	—	—	Juan Carlos Irurieta	18
1927	Primera División	33	17	6	10	53	35	40	10th	—	—	—	—	José Penichet	13
1928	Primera División	35	20	6	9	68	42	46	7th	—	—	—	—	Jerónimo Uriarte	8
1929	Primera División	17	12	3	2	28	11	27	3rd	—	—	—	—	José Granara Costa	12
1930	Primera División	35	22	8	5	66	29	52	3rd	—	—	—	—	Antonio Ganduglia	18
1931	Primera División	34	19	6	9	64	40	44	4th	—	—	—	—	Emilio Oscar Castro	16
1932	Primera División	34	22	6	6	81	43	50	1st	Copa Competencia LAF Copa Beccar Varela	W GS	—	—	Bernabé Ferreyra (Note: 44 goals in Primera División)	46 ♦
1933	Primera División	34	20	6	8	71	36	46	4th	Copa Competencia LAF Copa Beccar Varela	S1 QF	—	—	Bernabé Ferreyra	31
1934	Primera División	39	23	4	12	91	44	50	4th	—	—	—	—	Bernabé Ferreyra	30
1935	Primera División	34	19	6	9	71	47	44	5th	—	—	—	—	Bernabé Ferreyra	25
1936	Copa de Honor Copa Campeonato Copa de Oro	17 17 1	9 13 1	3 2 0	5 2 0	35 49 4	25 19 2	21 28 2	6th 1st W	—	—	Copa Aldao	W	Bernabé Ferreyra	24
1937	Primera División	34	27	4	3	106	43	58	1st	Copa Ibarguren	W	Copa Aldao	W	José Manuel Moreno	31
1938	Primera División	32	23	5	4	105	49	51	2nd	—	—	—	—	Luis María Rongo	32
1939	Primera División	34	23	4	7	100	43	50	2nd	Copa Escobar	SF	—	—	José Manuel Moreno	21
1940	Primera División	34	17	8	9	92	54	42	3rd	—	—	—	—	Roberto D'Alessandro	25
1941	Primera División	30	19	6	5	75	35	44	1st	Copa Escobar Copa Ibarguren	W W	Copa Aldao	W	José Manuel Moreno Adolfo Pedernera	14
1942	Primera División	30	20	6	4	79	37	46	1st	Copa Escobar Copa Ibarguren	RU W	Copa Aldao	RU	Adolfo Pedernera	24
1943	Primera División	30	19	6	5	74	38	44	2nd	Copa Escobar	QF	—	—	Ángel Labruna (Note: Joint top scorer; 23 goals in Primera División)	24 ♦
1944	Primera División	30	17	10	3	68	43	44	2nd	Copa Competencia GVI Copa Escobar	R16 QF	—	—	Ángel Labruna	26
1945	Primera División	30	20	6	4	66	34	46	1st	Copa Competencia GVI	QF	Copa Aldao	W	Ángel Labruna (Note: 25 goals in Primera División)	33 ♦
1946	Primera División	30	17	7	6	59	34	41	3rd	Copa Competencia GVI Copa Escobar	SF AB (Note: The cup was abandoned in the quarter-finals.)	—	—	Ángel Labruna	18
1947	Primera División	30	22	4	4	90	37	48	1st	—	—	Copa Aldao	W	Alfredo Di Stéfano (Note: 28 goals in Primera División)	29 ♦
1948	Primera División	30	12	13	5	59	48	37	2nd	Copa Competencia GVI	R16	—	—	Ángel Labruna	16
1949	Primera División	34	18	7	9	71	36	43	2nd	Copa Escobar	SF	—	—	Ángel Labruna	18
1950	Primera División	34	15	8	11	68	57	38	4th	—	—	—	—	Ángel Labruna	21
1951	Primera División	32	16	11	5	69	42	43	3rd	—	—	—	—	Santiago Vernazza	22 ♦
1952	Primera División	30	17	6	7	65	48	40	1st	Copa Ibarguren	W	—	—	Santiago Vernazza	18
1953	Primera División	30	18	7	5	60	36	43	1st	—	—	—	—	Eliseo Prado	21
1954	Primera División	30	16	6	8	56	37	38	3rd	—	—	—	—	Santiago Vernazza Walter Gómez	12
1955	Primera División	30	18	9	3	53	35	45	1st	—	—	—	—	Omar Sívori	11
1956	Primera División	30	17	9	4	61	32	43	1st	—	—	—	—	Omar Sívori	10
1957	Primera División	30	19	8	3	75	34	46	1st	—	—	Copa Aldao	W	Roberto Zárate (Note: 22 goals in Primera División)	22♦
1958	Primera División	30	14	9	7	62	45	35	5th	Copa Suecia	GS	—	—	Ermindo Onega	16
1959	Primera División	30	14	4	12	49	45	32	6th	—	—	—	—	Norberto Menéndez	14
1960	Primera División	30	16	7	7	46	29	39	3rd	—	—	—	—	Ermindo Onega Roberto Zárate	11
1961	Primera División	30	15	8	7	53	30	38	3rd	—	—	—	—	Ermindo Onega	11
1962	Primera División	28	18	5	5	61	28	41	2nd	—	—	—	—	Luis Artime	25 ♦
1963	Primera División	26	13	9	4	48	23	35	2nd	—	—	—	—	Luis Artime	24 ♦
1964	Primera División	30	13	11	6	42	30	37	3rd	—	—	—	—	Ermindo Onega	16
1965	Primera División	34	22	5	7	55	24	49	2nd	—	—	—	—	Oscar Más	16
1966	Primera División	38	22	12	4	66	26	56	2nd	—	—	Copa Libertadores	RU	Daniel Onega	25
1967	Metropolitano Nacional	22 15	9 9	5 1	8 5	31 33	23 15	23 19	S1 5th	—	—	Copa Libertadores	S2	Oscar Más	24
1968	Metropolitano Nacional	23 17	12 10	7 5	4 2	32 38	19 16	31 25	SF 2nd	—	—	—	—	Daniel Onega	17
1969	Metropolitano Nacional	0 0	0 0	0 0	0 0	0 0	0 0	0 0	RU 2nd	—	—	—	—	Oscar Más	24
1970	Metropolitano Nacional	0 0	0 0	0 0	0 0	0 0	0 0	0 0	2nd S1	—	—	Copa Libertadores	SF	Oscar Más	29
1971	Metropolitano Nacional	0 0	0 0	0 0	0 0	0 0	0 0	0 0	6th S1	—	—	—	—	Oscar Más	20
1972	Metropolitano Nacional	0 0	0 0	0 0	0 0	0 0	0 0	0 0	4th RU	—	—	—	—	Oscar Más	27
1973	Metropolitano Nacional	0 0	0 0	0 0	0 0	0 0	0 0	0 0	5th RU	—	—	Copa Libertadores	S1	Carlos Morete	25
1974	Metropolitano Nacional	0 0	0 0	0 0	0 0	0 0	0 0	0 0	S1 S1	—	—	—	—	Carlos Morete	25
1975	Metropolitano Nacional	0 0	0 0	0 0	0 0	0 0	0 0	0 0	1st W	—	—	—	—	Norberto Alonso	28
1976	Metropolitano Nacional	0 0	0 0	0 0	0 0	0 0	0 0	0 0	S2 RU	—	—	Copa Libertadores	RU	Daniel Passarella	25
1977	Metropolitano Nacional	0 0	0 0	0 0	0 0	0 0	0 0	0 0	1st S1	—	—	Copa Libertadores	S1	Víctor Marchetti	25
1978	Metropolitano Nacional	0 0	0 0	0 0	0 0	0 0	0 0	0 0	6th RU	—	—	Copa Libertadores	S2	Norberto Alonso	23
1979	Metropolitano Nacional	0 0	0 0	0 0	0 0	0 0	0 0	0 0	W W	—	—	—	—	Norberto Alonso	14
1980	Metropolitano Nacional	0 0	0 0	0 0	0 0	0 0	0 0	0 0	1st QF	—	—	Copa Libertadores	S1	Ramón Díaz	26
1981	Metropolitano Nacional	0 0	0 0	0 0	0 0	0 0	0 0	0 0	4th W	—	—	Copa Libertadores	S1	Ramón Díaz	21
1982	Nacional Metropolitano	0 0	0 0	0 0	0 0	0 0	0 0	0 0	S1 10th	—	—	Copa Libertadores	S2	Enzo Bulleri Antonio Alzamendi	9
1983	Nacional Metropolitano	0 0	0 0	0 0	0 0	0 0	0 0	0 0	QF 18th	—	—	—	—	Enzo Francescoli	11
1984	Nacional Metropolitano	0 0	0 0	0 0	0 0	0 0	0 0	0 0	RU 4th	—	—	—	—	Enzo Francescoli	29
1985	Nacional	14	9	2	3	26	12	20	SF	—	—	—	—	Luis Amuchástegui	9
1985–86	Primera División	36	23	10	3	74	26	56	1st	—	—	Copa Libertadores	W	Enzo Francescoli (Note: 25 goals in Primera División)	25 ♦
1986–87	Primera División	38	13	13	12	54	49	39	10th	—	—	Intercontinental Cup Copa Libertadores	W S2	Antonio Alzamendi	14
1987–88	Primera División	38	17	12	9	51	40	46	4th	—	—	Copa Interamericana	W	Jorge Da Silva	14
1988–89	Primera División	38	16	13	9	61	36	67	4th	—	—	Supercopa Libertadores	SF	Abel Balbo	12
1989–90	Primera División	38	20	13	5	48	20	53	1st	—	—	Supercopa Libertadores Copa Libertadores	R16 SF	Ramón Medina Bello	10
1990–91	Primera División	19 19	11 4	4 11	4 4	29 19	13 19	26 19	2nd 10th	—	—	Supercopa Libertadores Copa Libertadores	R16 GS	Ruben Da Silva	15
1991–92	Apertura Clausura	19 19	13 8	4 8	2 3	32 31	11 22	30 24	1st 5th	—	—	Supercopa Libertadores	RU	Ramón Díaz	21
1992–93	Apertura Clausura	19 19	10 10	5 3	4 6	28 33	13 21	23 23	2nd 3rd	—	—	Supercopa Libertadores Copa Libertadores	QF GS	Ramón Medina Bello	19
1993–94	Apertura Clausura	19 19	9 7	6 7	4 5	29 24	17 14	24 21	1st 5th	Copa Centenario	RU	Supercopa Libertadores	QF	Hernán Crespo	13
1994–95	Apertura Clausura	19 19	12 7	7 4	0 8	31 29	14 30	31 18	1st 10th	—	—	Supercopa Libertadores Copa Libertadores	QF SF	Enzo Francescoli	23
1995–96	Apertura Clausura	19 19	7 6	8 3	4 10	21 32	20 33	29 21	7th 14th	—	—	Supercopa Libertadores Copa Libertadores	SF W	Enzo Francescoli	23
1996–97	Apertura Clausura	19 19	15 12	1 5	3 2	52 37	22 20	46 41	1st 1st	—	—	Supercopa Libertadores Recopa Sudamericana Copa Libertadores	R16 RU R16	Enzo Francescoli	22
1997–98	Apertura Clausura	19 19	14 7	3 8	2 4	43 32	17 24	45 29	1st 7th	—	—	Supercopa Libertadores Copa Libertadores	W SF	Marcelo Salas	20
1998–99	Apertura Clausura	19 19	5 11	7 4	7 4	27 37	27 19	22 37	15th 2nd	—	—	Copa Mercosur Copa Libertadores	GS SF	Cristian Castillo	16
1999–2000	Apertura Clausura	19 19	13 12	5 6	1 1	42 44	21 17	44 42	1st 1st	—	—	Copa Mercosur Recopa Sudamericana Copa Libertadores	GS RU QF	Juan Pablo Ángel	28
2000–01	Apertura Clausura	19 19	10 13	7 2	2 4	41 48	24 27	37 41	2nd 2nd	—	—	Copa Mercosur Copa Libertadores	SF QF	Javier Saviola	27
2001–02	Apertura Clausura	19 19	12 13	5 4	2 2	51 39	16 13	41 43	2nd 1st	—	—	Copa Mercosur Copa Libertadores	GS R16	Martín Cardetti	20
2002–03	Apertura Clausura	19 19	11 13	3 4	5 2	35 43	23 18	36 43	3rd 1st	—	—	Copa Sudamericana Copa Libertadores	R16 QF	Fernando Cavenaghi	24
2003–04	Apertura Clausura	19 19	7 12	5 4	7 3	23 41	24 21	26 40	8th 1st	—	—	Copa Sudamericana Copa Libertadores	RU SF	Fernando Cavenaghi	27
2004–05	Apertura Clausura	19 19	9 8	6 3	4 8	28 31	19 29	33 27	3rd 10th	—	—	Copa Sudamericana Copa Libertadores	R16 SF	Ernesto Farías	13
2005–06	Apertura Clausura	19 19	8 9	4 7	7 3	31 39	22 24	28 34	6th 3rd	—	—	Copa Sudamericana Copa Libertadores	R16 QF	Ernesto Farías	23
2006–07	Apertura Clausura	19 19	11 9	5 6	3 4	33 26	17 17	38 33	3rd 4th	—	—	Copa Sudamericana Copa Libertadores	R16 GS	Ernesto Farías	13
2007-08	Apertura Clausura	19 19	6 13	5 4	8 2	31 29	33 13	23 43	14th 1st	—	—	Copa Sudamericana Copa Libertadores	SF R16	Radamel Falcao	19
2008–09	Apertura Clausura	19 19	2 7	8 6	9 6	20 24	29 25	14 27	20th 8th	—	—	Copa Sudamericana Copa Libertadores	QF GS	Radamel Falcao	16
2009–10	Apertura Clausura	19 19	5 6	6 4	8 9	23 16	26 21	21 22	14th 13th	—	—	Copa Sudamericana	S1	Facundo Buonanotte	9
2010–11	Apertura Clausura	19 19	8 6	7 8	4 5	21 15	18 15	31 26	4th 9th	—	—	—	—	Mariano Pavone	9
2011–12	Segunda División	38	20	13	5	66	28	73	1st	Copa Argentina	SF	—	—	Fernando Cavenaghi	19
2012–13	Inicial Final	19 19	7 10	8 5	4 4	28 28	16 22	29 35	8th 2nd	Copa Argentina	R32	—	—	Manuel Lanzini	8
2013–14	Inicial Final	19 19	5 11	6 4	8 4	12 28	14 15	21 37	17th 1st	Copa Campeonato	W	Copa Sudamericana	QF	Teófilo Gutiérrez	9
2014	Primera División	19	11	6	2	34	13	39	2nd	Copa Argentina	QF	Copa Sudamericana	W	Teófilo Gutiérrez	11
2015	Primera División	30	13	10	7	46	33	49	9th	Supercopa Argentina Copa Argentina	RU R16	Recopa Sudamericana Copa Libertadores Suruga Bank Championship Copa Sudamericana FIFA Club World Cup	W W W SF RU	Rodrigo Mora	14
2016	Primera División	16	4	6	6	21	22	18	S1	—	—	Copa Libertadores Recopa Sudamericana	R16 W	Lucas Alario	10
2016–17	Primera División	30	16	8	6	51	28	56	2nd	Copa Argentina Supercopa Argentina	W RU	Copa Libertadores	SF	Lucas Alario Sebastián Driussi	22
2017–18	Primera División	27	13	6	8	39	26	45	8th	Supercopa Argentina Copa Argentina	W W	Copa Libertadores FIFA Club World Cup	W 3rd	Ignacio Scocco	26
2018–19	Primera División	25	13	6	6	42	21	45	4th	Copa Argentina Copa de la Superliga	SF QF	Copa Libertadores Recopa Sudamericana	RU W	Lucas Pratto	17
2019–20	Primera División	23	14	5	4	41	18	47	2nd	Copa Argentina	W	Copa Libertadores	SF	Rafael Santos Borré (Note: Joint top scorer; 12 goals in Primera División)	17 ♦
2020	Cancelled	—	—	—	—	—	—	—	—	Copa de la Liga Profesional	S2	—	—	Rafael Santos Borré	8
2021	Primera División	25	16	6	3	53	19	54	1st	Copa Argentina Copa de la Liga Profesional Supercopa Argentina Trofeo de Campeones	R16 QF W W	Copa Libertadores	QF	Julián Alvarez (Note: 18 goals in Primera División)	26 ♦
2022	Primera División	27	14	5	8	43	22	47	3rd	Copa de la Liga Profesional Copa Argentina	QF QF	Copa Libertadores	R16	Julián Alvarez	18
2023	Primera División	27	19	4	4	50	20	61	1st	Copa de la Liga Profesional Copa Argentina Trofeo de Campeones	SF R32 W	Copa Libertadores	R16	Lucas Beltrán	17
2024	Primera División	27	11	10	6	38	21	43	5th	Copa de la Liga Profesional Copa Argentina Supercopa Argentina	QF R32 W	Copa Libertadores	SF	Miguel Borja	31
2025	Apertura Clausura Liga	18 17 32	9 6 14	8 4 11	1 7 7	25 22 41	10 18 24	35 22 53	QF R16 4th	Copa Argentina Supercopa Internacional	SF RU	Copa Libertadores FIFA Club World Cup	QF GS	Sebastián Driussi	10
Season	Division	Pld	W	D	L	GF	GA	Pts	Pos	Competition	Result	Competition	Result	Player(s)	Goals
