= 1936 Copa de Oro =

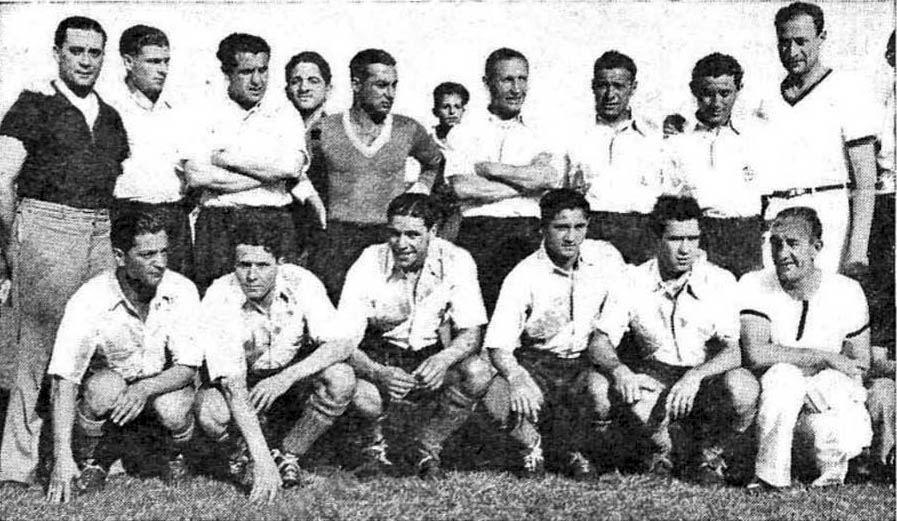
- River Plate, champions
- Event: 1936 Copa de Oro; 1936 Argentine Primera División
River Plate	San Lorenzo
Copa Campeonato	Copa de Honor
4	2
- Date: December 20, 1936; 89 years ago
- Venue: Estadio de Independiente, Avellaneda
- Referee: Bartolomé Macías

The 1936 Copa de Oro was the match to determine the 1936 Argentine Primera División champion, the 45th season of top-flight football in Argentina, and the Argentine participant in the 1936 Copa Aldao. It was contested between Copa de Honor winners San Lorenzo and Copa Campeonato champions River Plate.

The match was held at the C.A. Independiente Stadium in Avellaneda. River Plate won their fourth league title after defeating San Lorenzo 4–2.

== Background ==
The 1936 Argentine Primera División was split into two different tournaments, played under a single round-robin tournament. The first of them, "Copa de Honor", was won by San Lorenzo, while the second competition, the Copa Campeonato, was won by River Plate.

== Qualified teams ==
Team	Qualification	Previous finals app.
River Plate	Copa Campeonato winners	(none)
San Lorenzo	Copa de Honor winners	(none)

Bold indicates winning years

== Venues ==
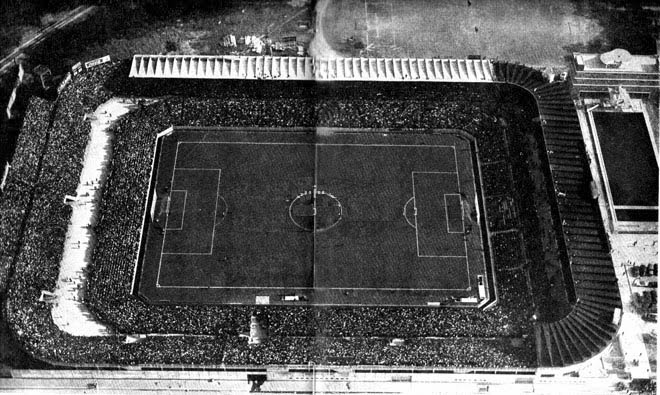

The series were played in C.A. Independiente Stadium, nicknamed La Doble Visera after its two flat concrete-roofed stands), It was the home of Independiente, before the club moved to the current Libertadores de América Stadium, located on the same site.

Inaugurated in 1928, it was built using concrete, becoming the first stadium in Argentina to employ this material and the second in the world after Harvard Stadium in the United States.

== Match details ==
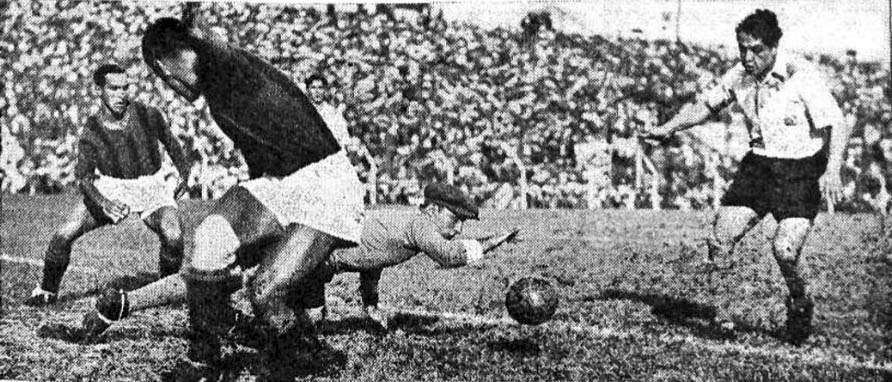
Fltr: team of San Lorenzo and some moments of the match held in Avellaneda
1936 Copa de Oro
20 December 1936

River Plate	4–2	San Lorenzo
Cesarini 37'; Ferreyra 73', 86'; Pedernera 76'	Report	Pantó 55'; Canteli 81'

Estadio de Independiente, Avellaneda
Referee: Bartolomé Macías

**River Plate**
**San Lorenzo**

GK	(Argentina) Sebastián Sirni
DF	(Argentina) Luis Vassini
DF	(Argentina) Alberto Cuello
MF	(Argentina) Esteban Malazzo
MF	(Argentina) José María Minella
MF	(Argentina) Aarón Wergifker
FW	(Argentina) Carlos Peucelle
FW	(Italy) Renato Cesarini
FW	(Argentina) Bernabé Ferreyra
FW	(Argentina) José M. Moreno
FW	(Argentina) Adolfo Pedernera
Manager:
(Hungary) Imre Hirschl

GK	(Argentina) Sebastián Gualco
DF	(Argentina) Oscar Tarrío
DF	(Argentina) Lorenzo Gilli
MF	(Argentina) Ismael Arrese
MF	(Argentina) Mario Scavone
MF	(Argentina) Alberto Chividini
FW	(Argentina) Rubén Cavadini
FW	(Argentina) Ricardo Alarcón
FW	(Argentina) Genaro Canteli
FW	(Argentina) Diego García
FW	(Argentina) Miguel Angel Pantó
Manager:
(Argentina) José Fossa

== Aftermath ==
Courtesy of their win, River Plate qualified for the 1936 Copa Aldao. They went on to beat Uruguayan side Peñarol 5–1 to win their first Copa Aldao.

In June 2013 (77 years after the match was played) the Argentine Football Association (AFA) cited on its website the "Copa de Oro" as a league title for River Plate (apart from the "Copa Campeonato"). The "Copa de Honor" was also included as a league title for San Lorenzo de Almagro.

Nevertheless, some historians consider the "Copa de Oro" a domestic cup title instead of a league championship, stating that this cup was only contested to qualify an Argentine representative to play the Copa Aldao against the Uruguayan champion. The AFA's Memoria y Balance 1936 (Annual Report) cited River Plate as "Campeón 1936" mentioning both titles won, Copa de Oro and Copa Campeonato, while San Lorenzo is only mentioned as "Copa de Honor winner".
