= Imre Hirschl =

Hungarian football manager (born 1900)

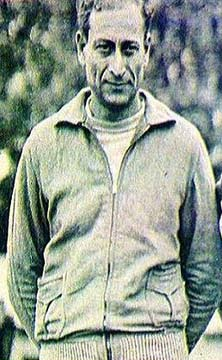

Personal information
- Full name: Imre Hirschl
- Date of birth: 11 June 1900
- Place of birth: Apostag, Kingdom of Hungary
- Date of death: 23 September 1973 (aged 73)
- Place of death: Buenos Aires, Argentina
- Height: 1.72 m (5 ft 8 in)

Youth career
- 1910-20s?: Húsos

Senior career*
Years	Team	Apps	(Gls)
??	??	??	(??)

Managerial career
- ??: Palestra Itália
- circa 1933: Gimnasia La Plata
- 1933–1938: River Plate
- cira 1939: Rosario Central
- Pre-1943: Banfield
- 1943: San Lorenzo
- 1945–1946: Cruzeiro-RS
- 1946–1948: Marte
- 1949–1952: Peñarol
- 1956: Peñarol
- 1961: River Plate
- * Club domestic league appearances and goals

Imre Hirschl, also known as Emérico Hirschl, or Emérico Hirsch, (11 June 1900 – 23 September 1973) was a Hungarian professional football and manager.

== Early life ==
It is often claimed that Hirschl was an important player for Ferencváros. It is also claimed that he also played in Yugoslavia, Austria and France. However, there is no evidence for any of these claims.

The lesser-known second-division Hungarian side Húsos FC, (who were forcibly relegated due to bribery around that time) is the only club that, it is claimed, actually has any records of him as a player.

From his daughter Gabriela, a psychoanalyst in Buenos Aires, it is asserted here that he fought on the British side in World War I and in Post-WWI Palestine, activities which reportedly left Hirschl with scars on his hip and wrist. She also claims that he came from a wealthy family and also played football in Czechoslovakia. Unfortunately, the veracity of these claims is unknown.

Otherwise, very little is known about Hirschl's early life.

== Career ==
In 1929, while Ferencváros embarked on a tour to South America, Hirschl is said to have met wealthy Brazilian businessman and president of Palestra Italia (now known as Palmeiras), Eduardo Matarazzo, in Paris while attempting to procure a visa to New York. They later reunited in São Paulo, where it is said that Matarazzo's commitment to his club led Hirschl to agree to work there as an assistant coach, and later as head coach, for two games in 1931.

In the early 1930s, New York City side Hakoah All-Stars undertook a tour of South America. This led him to cross paths with Béla Guttmann, who is said to have employed him as a masseur. This continued until, whilst on the Argentine leg of their tour, the American side was forced to terminate his contract as they could no longer afford to pay him.

Hirschl then offered his services to the different clubs in the Buenos Aires area, under the spurious claim that he was the ex-coach of Hakoah All-Stars, and successfully acquired the coaching job at Gimnasia La Plata in 1932. With Gimnasia, he lost the first three games and won only three in the first half of the season, but in this era the club generated the nickname "El Expreso Platense". He guided them to a seventh-place finish in the Argentine Championship that season. He gained the nickname "El Mago" ("The Wizard") from fans and media.

In 1933, Gimnasia was involved in a close title race, but two highly controversial referee decisions in the final phase of the season in games against Boca Juniors and San Lorenzo put an end to hopes. Gimnasia finished sixth, within four points of the title, scoring 90 goals. In his time at Gimnasia, Hirschl introduced some major players in the club's history, notably Arturo Naón who would go on to become Gimnasia's record goal scorer.

At the beginning of 1935 he took the coaching position at Argentine club River Plate, with whom he won back-to-back league titles in 1936 (two titles were won that year) and 1937. Hirschl also led River Plate to a domestic cup and two continental trophies during his tenure. In 1938 he was replaced by Renato Cesarini.

In 1939 he took the coaching position at Rosario Central.

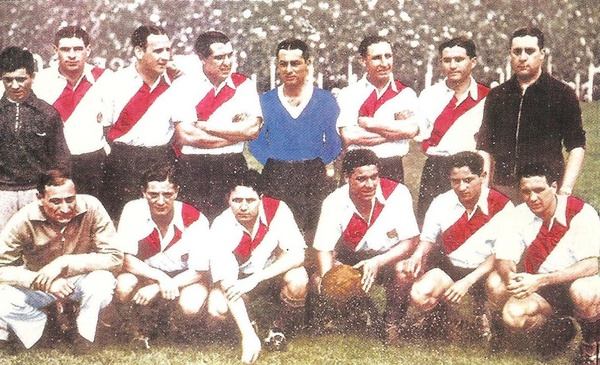
Hirschl (bottom furthest left) with his 1936 title-winning River Plate side

After reportedly spending the early 1940s with Gimnasia whilst they toured South America, he moved to Buenos Aires club Banfield before, in 1943, switching to San Lorenzo. There, however, he was brought before the sports courts in December 1943 where he was one ten individuals who were suspended from footballing activity in connection with a cheating scandal at Banfield.

This severely damaged his reputation in Argentina.

In August 1944, the Brazilian Sporting Council gave Hirschl permission to coach the local club Cruzeiro-RS in Porto Alegre. He took up the position there in early 1945 and remained at Cruzeiro until his resignation in June 1946, when he decided to coach the first division club Marte in Mexico City, where he signed a two-year contract. His successor at Cruzeiro-RS was Telemaco Frazaeo de Lima, a former Grêmio player.

In March 1949, Hirschl signed with Uruguayan club Peñarol. It is reported that his first training session gained a crowd of 1,500 spectators.

Hirschl, who went by the name Emérico Hirsch in Uruguay, coached the capital side until at least 1951. Hirschl continued his predecessor Randolph Galloway's usage of the WM Formation and won the Uruguayan Championship in 1949 and 1951 as well as three domestic cups. According to Luciano Álvarez, he remained Peñarol manager until 1953, returning in either 1955 or 1956 for a brief second spell.

In January 1961 he returned to Buenos Aires and River Plate for a short period of time.

== Achievements ==
River Plate

- Argentine Primera División: 1936 Copa Campeonato, 1936 Copa de Oro, 1937
- Copa Ibarguren: 1937
- Copa Aldao: 1936, 1937

Peñarol

- Uruguayan Primera División: 1949, 1951
- Torneo Competencia: 1949, 1951
- Torneo de Honor: 1949, 1950, 1951

Notes

1. 1936 Title Controversy: The 1936 season was divided into two single round-robin tournaments, "Copa Campeonato" (won by River Plate) and "Copa de Honor" (won by San Lorenzo). At the end of the season, both teams played the "Copa de Oro", a single match won by River. In its Memoria y Balance (Annual Report) published by the AFA that year, River Plate is mentioned as "1936 Champion" while San Lorenzo is only mentioned as "Copa de honor winning team". In its 100th anniversary book published in 1993, the AFA listed River Plate as the only 1936 champion. In 2013, the AFA included three 1936 championships on its website, mentioning River Plate as Copa de Oro and Copa Campeonato winner and San Lorenzo as Copa de Honor winner, therefore both clubs added one league title to their honours. Moreover, some historians consider Copa de Oro a national cup instead of a league championship, stating that it was only contested to qualify an Argentine representative to play the Copa Aldao against the Uruguayan champion.
