= 1933 Copa de Competencia (LAF) Final =

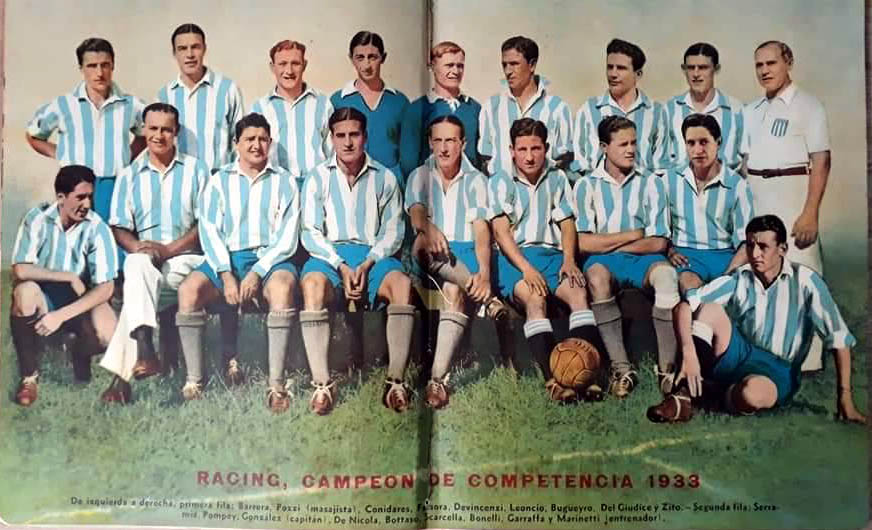
- Racing Club, champions
- Event: Copa Competencia (LAF)
Racing	San Lorenzo
4	0
- Date: November 26, 1933
- Venue: Chacarita Juniors, Buenos Aires
- Attendance: 30,000

The 1933 Copa de Competencia Final was the final that decided the winner of the 2nd (and last) edition of Copa de Competencia, an Argentine domestic cup organised by the dissident body Liga Argentina de Football, the first professional league of Argentina.

The final was held in the Chacarita Juniors' stadium (located in Villa Crespo) on November 26, 1933. With an attendance of 30,000, Racing Club defeated San Lorenzo 4–0 winning their first Copa de Competencia championship.

== Qualified teams ==
Team	Previous finals app.
Racing	(none)
San Lorenzo	(none)

== Overview ==
This first edition was contested by all of the 18 teams that took part in the Primera División league season in a single elimination format. Racing Club beat River Plate 1–0 at San Lorenzo Stadium), Estudiantes de La Plata 3–1 (at Independiente), Boca Juniors (4–1), and Vélez Sarsfield 1–0 (in the semifinal, at Chacarita Juniors).

On the other hand, San Lorenzo defeated Gimnasia y Esgrima LP 3–2 (at Independiente), lost to Vélez Sársfield 1–4 (at Boca Juniors Stadium in the losers group), then defeated Ferro Carril Oeste 1–0 (at Argentinos Jrs.) and beat Talleres de Remedios de Escalada 3–1 (in the semifinal, at Independiente).

== Road to the final ==
Note: all the matches played in neutral venues.

Racing		Round	San Lorenzo	
Opponent	Result	Stage	Opponent	Result
River Plate	1–0	First Round	Gimnasia y Esgrima (LP)	3–2
Estudiantes (LP)	2–1	Second round	Vélez Sarsfield	1–4
Boca Juniors	4–1	Quarterfinal	Ferro Carril Oeste	1–0
Vélez Sarsfield	1–0	Semifinal	Talleres (RE)	3–1

== Match details ==
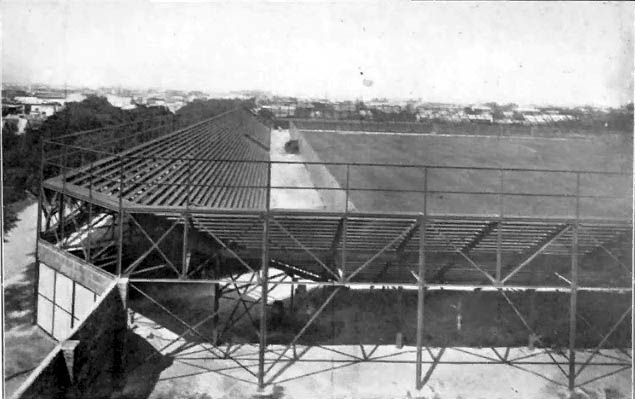
Chacarita Jrs. Stadium, venue

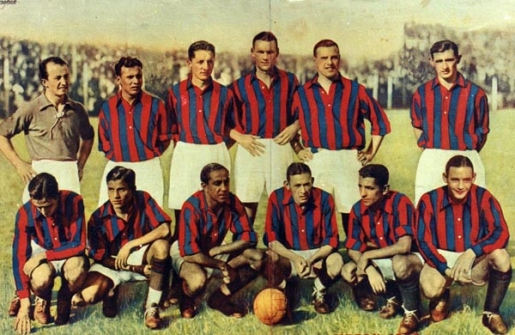
A San Lorenzo team of 1933

1933 Copa Competencia (LAF) Final
November 26, 1933
Final

Racing	4–0	San Lorenzo
Fassora 8'; Pacheco 36' (o.g.); Conidares 52'; Pastora 66'	Report

Chacarita Juniors, Buenos Aires
Attendance: 30,000

Racing	San Lorenzo

GK	(Argentina) Cándido De Nicola
DF	(Argentina) José González
DF	(Argentina) Arturo Scarcella
MF	(Argentina) Camilo Bonelli
MF	(Argentina) Ángel Serramía
MF	(Argentina) Francisco Garrafa
FW	(Argentina) Demetrio Conidares
FW	(Argentina) Vicente Zito
FW	(Argentina) Alberto Fassora
FW	(Argentina) Eduardo Leoncio
FW	(Argentina) Roberto Bugueyro
Manager:
(Hungary) Eugenio Medgyessy

GK	(Argentina) Jaime Lema
DF	(Argentina) Félix Pacheco
DF	(Argentina) José Fossa
MF	(Argentina) Alberto Chividini
MF	(Argentina) Mario Scavone
MF	(Paraguay) Cipriano Achinelli
FW	(Argentina) Gabriel Magán
FW	(Paraguay) Jacinto Villalba
FW	(Brazil) Petronilho
FW	(Argentina) Genaro Cantelli
FW	(Argentina) Arturo Arrieta
Manager:
(Argentina) Atilio Giuliano
