= Carlos Peucelle =

Argentine footballer

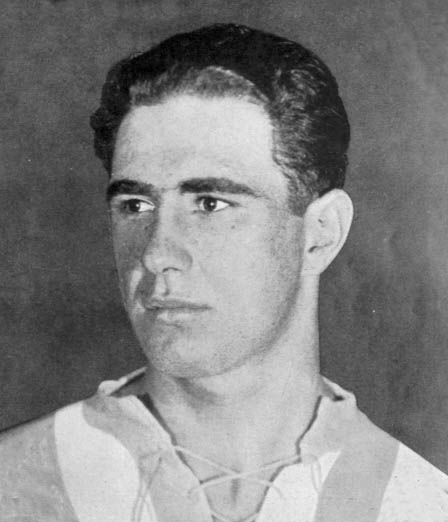
- Peucelle in 1929

Personal information
- Full name: Carlos Desiderio Peucelle
- Date of birth: 13 September 1908
- Place of birth: Buenos Aires, Argentina
- Date of death: 1 April 1990 (aged 81)
- Positions: Attacking midfielder; right winger

Youth career
- Club Deportivo Anchorena
- Boca Juniors
- San Telmo
- Sportivo Barracas

Senior career*
Years	Team	Apps	(Gls)
1925–1926	San Telmo	3	(1)
1927–1930	Sportivo Buenos Aires	117	(31)
1931–1941	River Plate	307	(113)

International career
1928–1940	Argentina	59	(12)

Managerial career
- 1945–1946: River Plate
- 1954: San Lorenzo
- 1960: Sporting Cristal
- 1966: River Plate
Medal record
Men's Football
Representing Argentina
Copa América
Winner	1929 Argentina	Team
Winner	1937 Argentina	Team
FIFA World Cup
Runner-up	1930 Uruguay	Team
- * Club domestic league appearances and goals

Carlos Desiderio Peucelle (13 September 1908 – 1 April 1990) was an Argentine football player who played as an inside forward or as a right winger and who is considered one of finest wingers in the history of Argentinian football. He is also known for being the catalyst for starting "La Máquina" with River Plate who went on to dominate football in South America in the 1940s.

== Playing career ==
Peucelle played iat first for San Telmo and Sportivo Buenos Aires before joining Argentine giants River Plate for a fee of 10,000 pesos. Peucelle gained the nickname "El Primer Millonario" because of this big money transfer.

Peucelle played for River from 1931 to 1941 (307 matches and scored 143 goals). During this time "Los Millonarios" were champions of Argentina on 4 occasions; 1932, 1936, 1937 and 1941. He is credited as being one of the creators of "La Máquina" (The Machine), the all conquering River Plate team of the 1940s. He even wrote a book entitled "Futbol Todotiempo e Historia de La Máquina" (Football the times and history of "La Máquina").

Peucelle also played for the Argentina national football team he was in the squad of the 1930 FIFA World Cup, where he scored three goals, and played in the final match against Uruguay, which Argentina lost 2–4.

Peucelle was part of two Copa América winning squads, in 1929 and 1937.

Peucelle played a total of 59 games for Argentina scoring 12 goals.

== Coaching career ==
After he retired, he became the chief manager of several teams throughout Latin America. These included; Deportivo Cali in Colombia, Deportivo Saprissa in Costa Rica, Sporting Cristal in Peru and Olimpia in Paraguay. Peucelle also managed River Plate and San Lorenzo in Argentina. Peucelle established the first soccer school in Colombia.

== Career statistics ==
=== International goals ===
Argentina's goal tally first

#	Date	Venue	Opponent	Score	Result	Competition
1.	16 June 1929	Estadio Gasómetro, Buenos Aires, Argentina	Uruguay	1–0	2–0	Friendly
2.	3 November 1929	Estadio Gasómetro, Buenos Aires, Argentina	Peru	1–0	3–0	1929 South American Championship
3.	26 July 1930	Estadio Centenario, Montevideo, Uruguay	United States	5–0	6–1	1930 FIFA World Cup
4.	26 July 1930	Estadio Centenario, Montevideo, Uruguay	United States	6–0	6–1	1930 FIFA World Cup
5.	30 July 1930	Estadio Centenario, Montevideo, Uruguay	Uruguay	1–1	2–4	1930 FIFA World Cup Final
6.	19 April 1931	Estadio de Puerto Sajonia, Asunción, Paraguay	Paraguay	1–0	1–1	Friendly
7.	22 September 1931	Estadio de Puerto Sajonia, Asunción, Paraguay	Paraguay	1–0	5–1	Friendly
8.	18 July 1935	Estadio Centenario, Montevideo, Uruguay	Uruguay	1–0	1–1	1935 Copa Héctor Gómez
9.	5 March 1940	Estadio Gasómetro, Buenos Aires, Argentina	Brazil	2–0	6–1	1940 Roca Cup
10.	5 March 1940	Estadio Gasómetro, Buenos Aires, Argentina	Brazil	3–0	6–1	1940 Roca Cup
11.	5 March 1940	Estadio Gasómetro, Buenos Aires, Argentina	Brazil	4–0	6–1	1940 Roca Cup
12.	17 March 1940	Estadio Racing Club, Avellaneda, Argentina	Brazil	3–0	5–1	1940 Roca Cup

== Honours ==
=== Club ===
River Plate

- Primera División (4): 1932, 1936, 1937, 1941
- Copa Competencia (LAF) (1): 1932
- Copa Ibarguren (2): 1937, 1941
- Copa Adrián C. Escobar (1): 1941
- Copa Aldao (3): 1936, 1937, 1941

=== International ===
Argentina

- Copa América (2): 1929, 1937
- FIFA World Cup Runner-up: 1930
