= Bernabé Ferreyra =

Argentine footballer

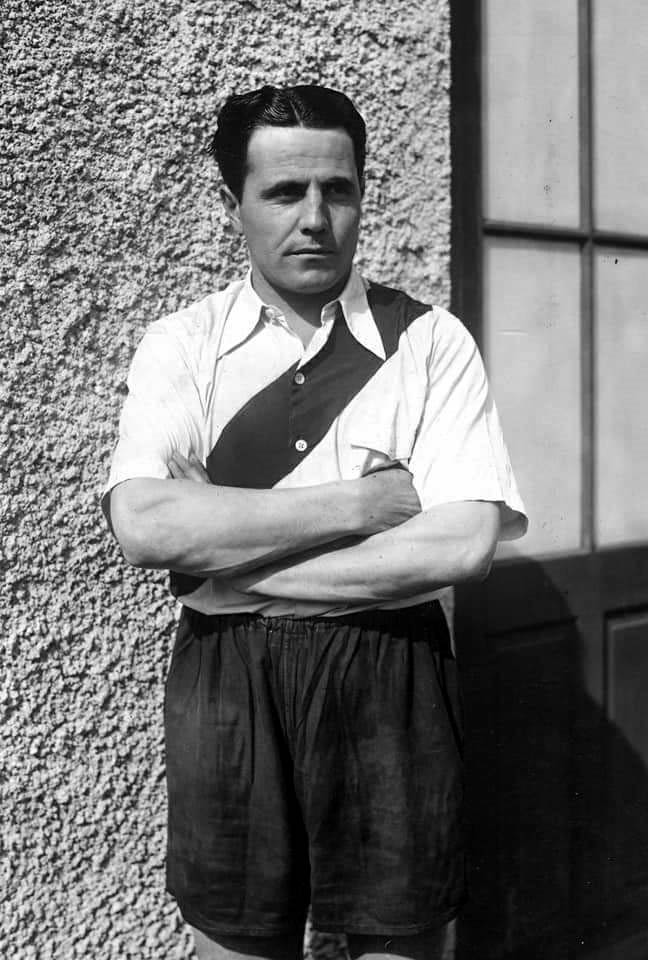
- A young Ferreyra c. 1932

Personal information
- Date of birth: 12 February 1909
- Place of birth: Rufino, Argentina
- Date of death: 22 May 1972 (aged 63)
- Position: Forward

Senior career*
Years	Team	Apps	(Gls)
1927–1932	Tigre	43	(45)
1930–1931	→ Vélez Sársfield (loan)	25	(38)
1932–1939	River Plate	185	(187)

International career
1930–1937	Argentina	4	(0)
- * Club domestic league appearances and goals

Bernabé Ferreyra (12 February 1909 – 22 May 1972) was an Argentine association football forward. He was one of the first professional players in Argentine football to reach great popularity, to the point that he had a movie biography. Ferreyra ranks 6th among the all-time Primera División top scorers, with an average of almost 1 goal per match (233/234). At the end of his active career in 1939, Ferryra had achieved a record of having more goals than matches played.

Throughout his career he was known as "El Mortero de Rufino" ("the mortar of Rufino" referring to the tremendous potency of his shot), due to his capacity as a striker and his strong kick. He was also known as La Fiera (the fierce). It is said that this nickname was born when Hugo Marini (a journalist for Crítica) overheard a conversation between an old man and a boy, in which the old man said "He's not a man. He's a beast" while referring to Ferreyra.

With his 1932 transfer to River Plate, he became the first association football player in history to be transferred for more than £1 million in modern money terms (£23 000 GBP or £1,328,431.76 in 2023)

== Playing career ==
=== Club ===
Ferreyra was born in the city of Rufino, Santa Fe Province. Since early age Ferreyra chose football as his main activity, leaving school behind. Besides, he was expelled from school at 11 years old due to he used to escape to play in a field next to it. When his mother realised that Bernabé abandoned school, she sent him to live with his uncle.

His debut in football was at 14 years old in Jorge Newbery, a local club from his home town where he scored 24 goals in 22 matches. At the age of 18 he went to Club Atlético Buenos Aires al Pacífico, a club formed by workers of Buenos Aires and Pacific Railway based in Junín. With Bernabé in the team, CABAP won the Liga Juninense championship beating Club Atlético Sarmiento in the final.

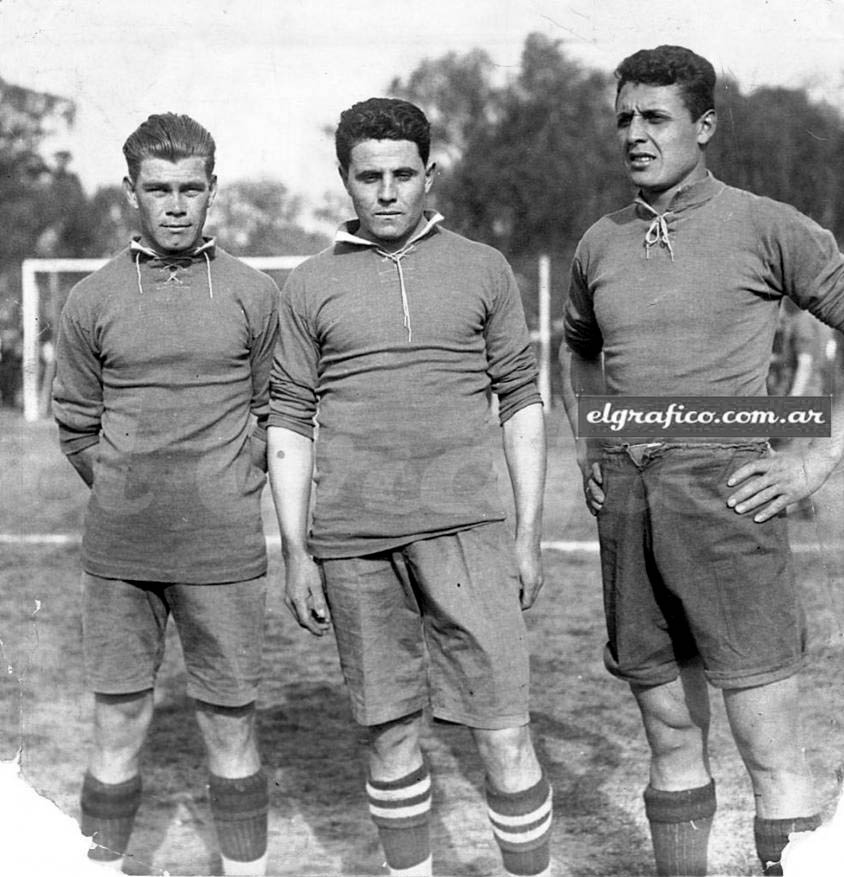
Juan C. Haedo, Bernabé Ferreyra, and Alberto Cuello, players of C.A. Tigre in 1928

His senior career started in 1926 playing for Newell's Old Boys, playing three matches there before returning to his home town. One year later he tried at Talleres de Remedios de Escalada but was not chosen to stay with the team. His next team was Tigre, that was playing in Primera División by then. Ferreyra debuted in Tigre in 1929 in a friendly match v El Porvenir, scoring four goals.

He was given on loan to Huracán for a tour to Brazil, where he played eight matches scoring 11 goals. Between 1930 and 1931, Tigre loaned him for free to Vélez Sársfield, to play with the club during their Pan-American tour. (striker Francisco Varallo was also loaned by Gimnasia y Esgrima LP). He scored 38 goals with the team during the tour. During the tour, goalkeeper of Peruvian Sport Boys collapsed on the pitch after a shot by Ferreyra hit his face, causing him a concussion.

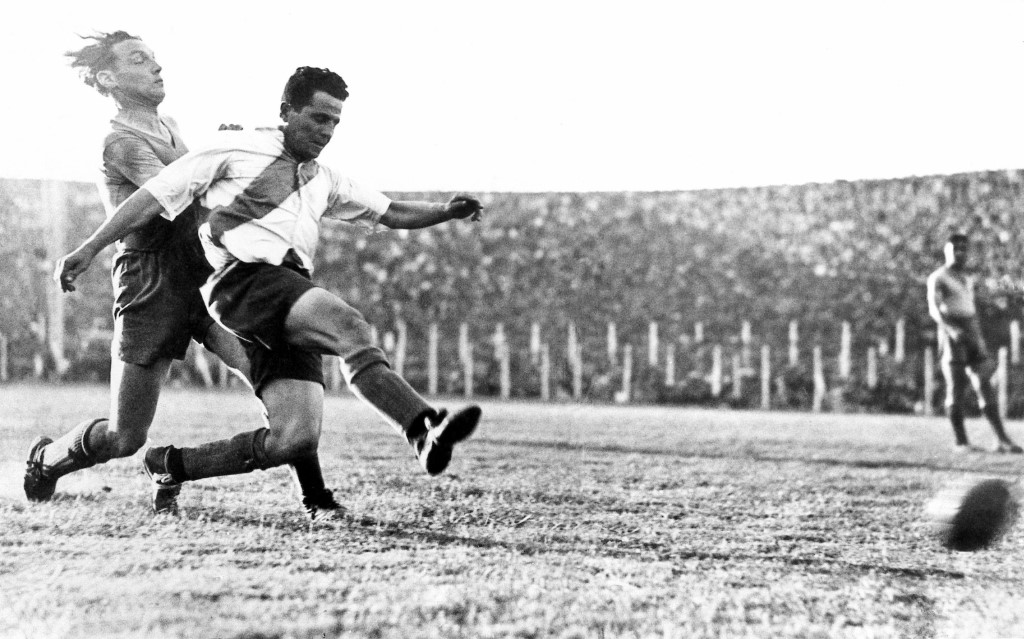
La Fiera firing his fearsome cannon shot in River Plate

In 1932, Ferreyra was transferred from Tigre to River Plate for a record transfer fee of $50,000, the first time the world record fee was broken outside the United Kingdom. He kept this record for a total of 17 year –the longest unbroken time period for this record. Due to the huge amount of money paid for Ferreyra's trading –along with Carlos Peucelle's one year before–, earned River Plate the nickname Millonarios ("Millionaires") that has remained until present days. The magazine Caras y Caretas (Argentina) published that the amount paid for Ferreyra's trading was the equivalent to the cost of 11 luxury cars, 5,000 pairs of shoes, and 514 suits (all of first quality).

His first match with River was on 13 March 1932 against Chacarita Juniors. River won 3–1 and Ferreyra scored 2 goals. Bernabé played a total of 185 matches for River, scoring 187 goals, with an average of 1.01 goal per game. He won 3 Primera División titles, all of them in River Plate (1932, 1936 and 1937). In the 1932 season he was the top scorer with 43 goals. This also gave him the title of top scorer in South America. His fame and striking strength was such that the newspaper Crítica gave a prize to the first goalkeeper that played Ferreyra without receiving a goal. The prize was awarded to Cándido De Nicola of Huracán (despite still suffering one goal in a 1–1 draw).

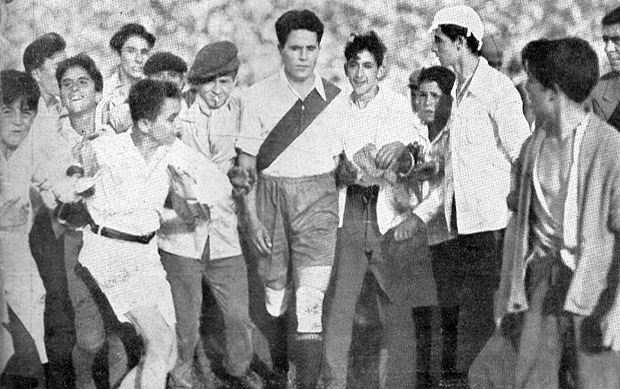
Ferreyra surrounded by the fans during his last match in 1939

Ferreyra's shot was so strong that Independiente goalkeeper, Fernando Bello, injured his two wrists after stopping a penalty kick by him. With each passing match, Ferreyra was nicknamed different ways, such as Cañonero (Cannonade), Rompe redes (Nets breaker), and also Balazo (gunshot) when he started scoring from a distance of 40 meters.

River Plate won the 1932 championship with 84 goals scored, 43 scored by Ferreyra.

Ferreyra finished his career prematurely due to the frequent injuries caused by his rivals. His last official match was on 11 May 1939 against Newell's Old Boys, which ended 2–2 and Ferreyra did not score. He retired at the early age of 29 and never accepted being a coach. Ferreyra had also a tribute match v Peñarol at Estadio Monumental, with a high attendance.

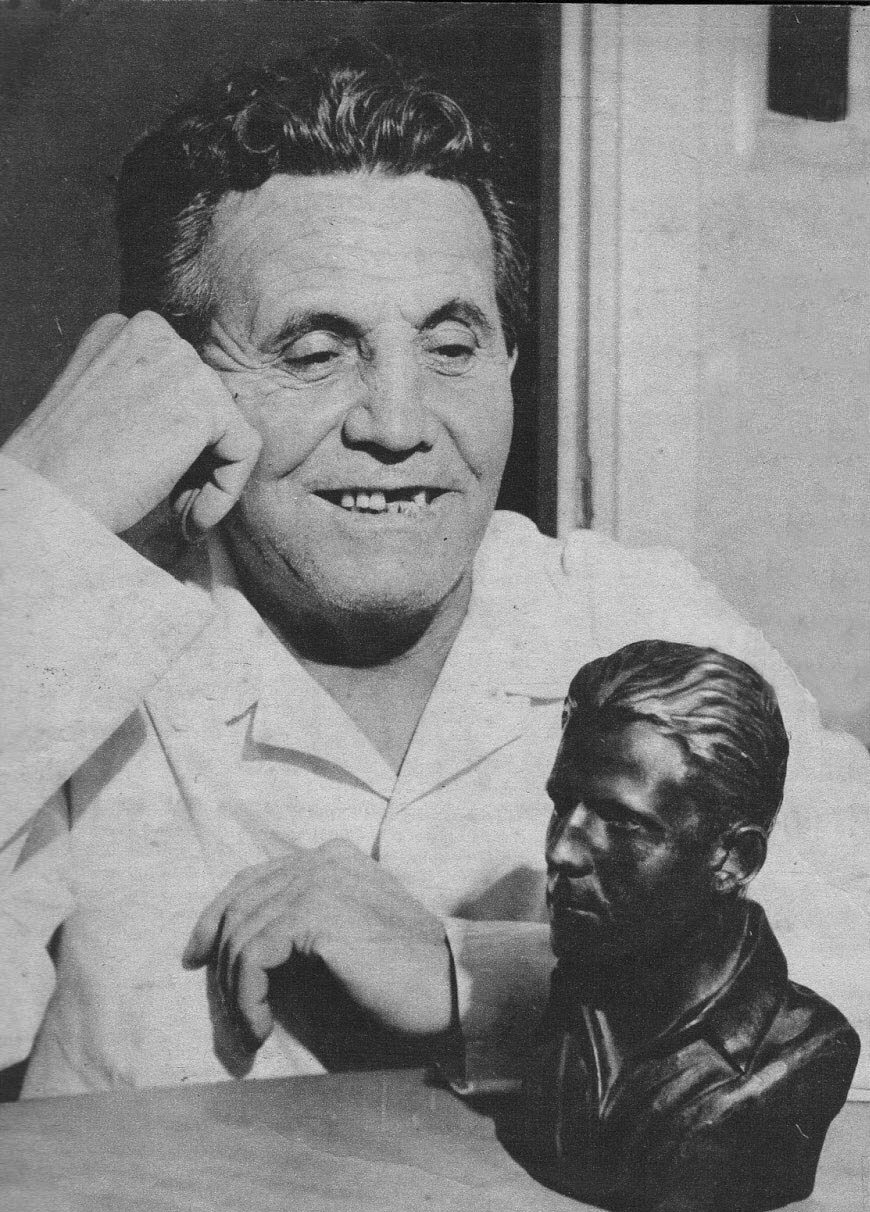
A middle-aged Ferreyra in 1961

Bernabé was an exceptional player: his rivals had to work on him twice as much as with other players. For all of us, his teammates, he made things easier. But as a man, he was valued more. Bernabé earned as much money as he wanted but he was not concerned with keeping it. He gave other people a lot of money, without asking for anything in return. When he shook your hand, you could be sure that you had a friend for the rest of your life .

— José Manuel Moreno about Ferreyra

Ferreyra, along Valeriano López and Arthur Friedenreich, are the only American professional footballers with an average of more than 1 goal per match (including domestic and international cups).

=== International ===
Ferreyra debuted in Argentina national football team on 25 May 1931, against Uruguay in a Copa Lipton match, although he did not play well and was criticized by journalists. His run at national team was brief although he win a Copa América with the squad in 1937.

Ferreyra did not participate in any FIFA World Cup.

== Personal life ==
He married Juanita in 1936 and had two children, Bernabé Daniel and Carlos Alberto.

== In popular culture ==
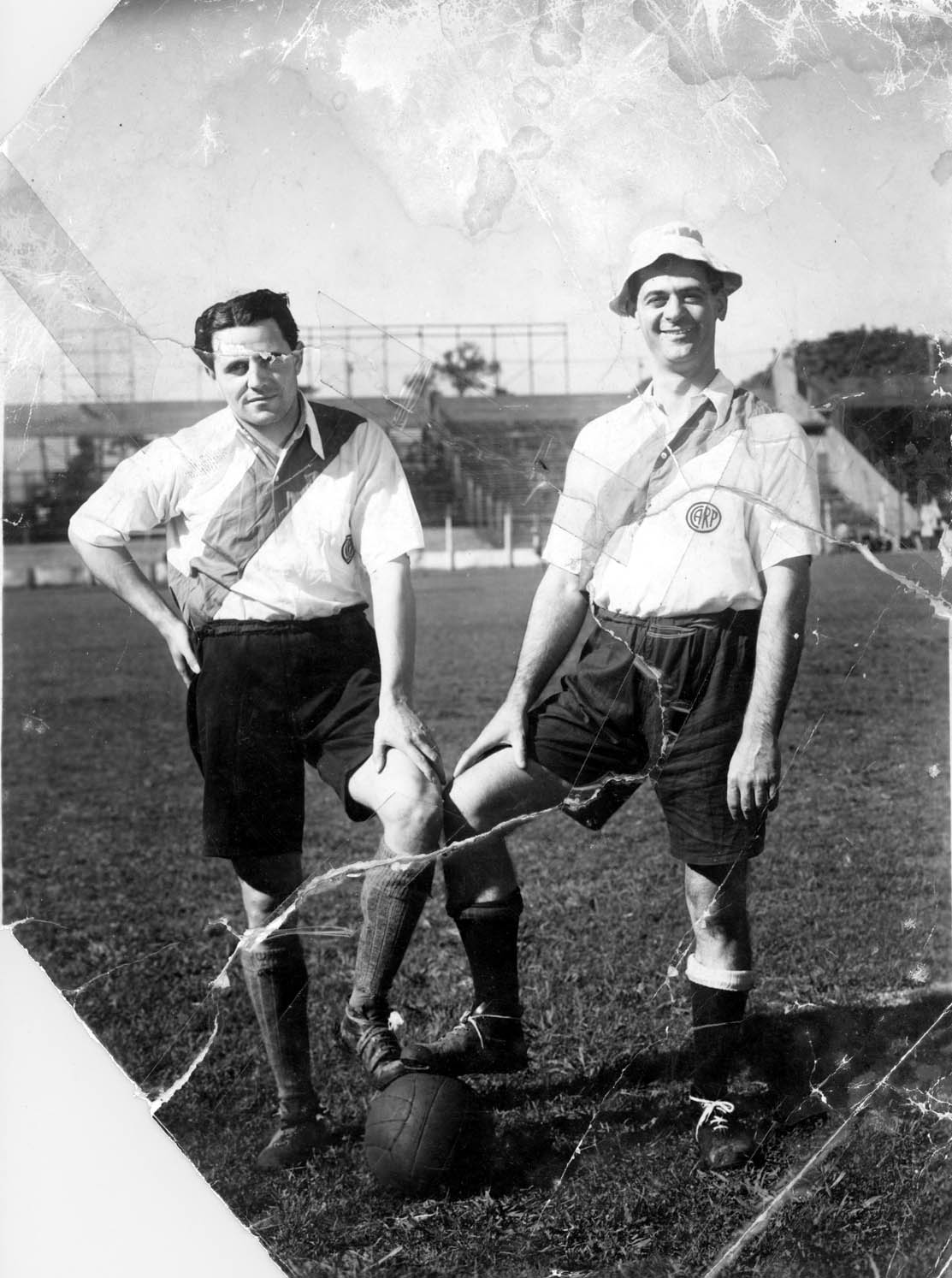
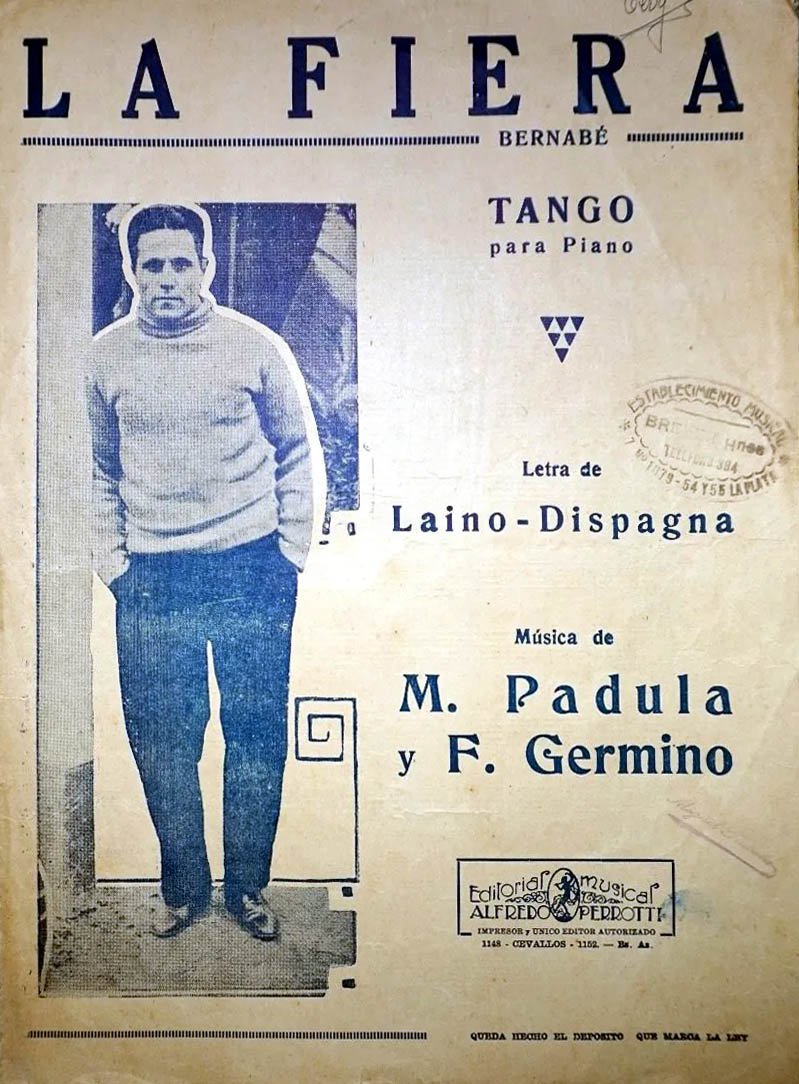
(Left): Ferreyra (left) and Luis Sandrini during the filming of El Cañonero de Giles in 1937; right: Ferreyra depicted on the cover of tango La Fiera sheet music

Ferreyra had participations in Argentine cinema, debuting as actor in the movie El Cañonero de Giles (1937) written and directed by Manuel Romero. The title is a parody of Ferreyra's nickname El Mortero de Rufino while the movie narrated, in a comical tone, the life of a footballer (Luis Sandrini) from San Andrés de Giles that remarkably increased the strength of his shot when hearing the barking of a dog. The football scenes were filmed at River Plate Stadium, with Ferreyra and other players of the club making some cameos.

After his retirement, Ferreyra also acted in other movies, such as El susto que Pérez se llevó, a comedy directed by Richard Harland, HAy que casar a Ernesto (Orestes Caviglia, 1941), and La importancia de ser ladrón (Julio Saraceni, 1944).

Argentine tango La Fiera, dedicated to Bernabé Ferreyra, was recorded by Francisco Canaro and his orchestra in 1932. The song was composed by Francisco Laino and Adolfo Dispagna (lyrics) and Miguel Padula and Federico Germino (music).

In national football,
A player stands,
one of the most phenomenal
for being a great scorer
there is no one who can resist,
his formidable shot
has defeated many
(chorus)
Boys, be careful
that The Fiera is coming

Excerpt from La Fiera (1932), a tango dedicated to Ferreyra

== In his own words ==
In his own words:

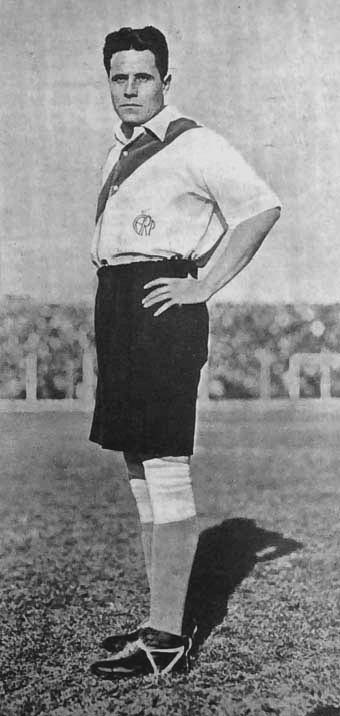
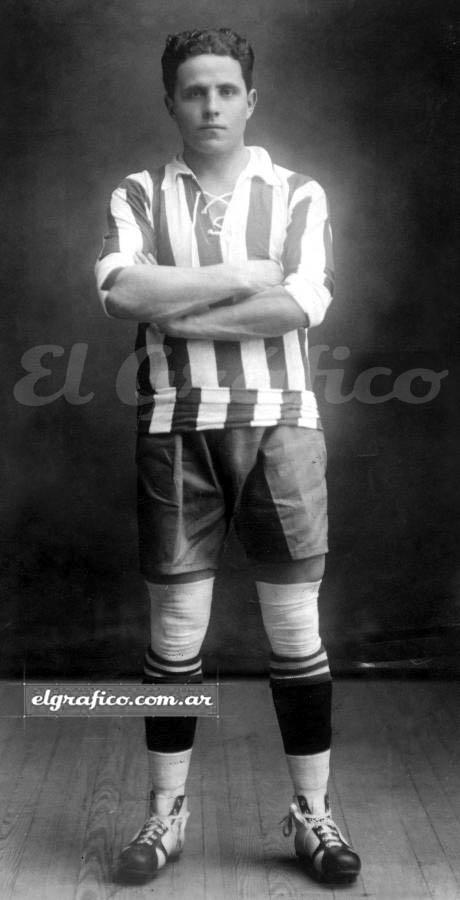
Two images of Ferreyra, with the River Plate and Argentina uniforms

My brothers persisted in telling me I had to be the stronger shooter in town. They made me kick the ball from morning to afternoon, every day. They used to encourage me shouting: 'Harder, even harder!'

I prefer to retire from football before football retires from me

There has been great football players, but my idol is Adolfo Pedernera.

— During a radio interview with José María Muñoz, 1972

'So you are "La Fiera" (The Fierce): I wanted to meet you', said Carlos Gardel to Ferreyra, who answered: 'No, master, it is you who are "La Fiera" when singing'.

— A meeting between both legends and popular idols

They should have done me the favor of waiting for me with a prisoner truck at the exit of the stadium and imprisoning me six days a week, only bringing me to the stadium on Sundays to play the match. Once it finished, imprisoning me again. In that way, I would have saved some money earned in my career.

— Ferreyra during an interview with sports journalist Borocotó published in 1972

In this little notebook I register all the people who told me they had been at the stadium that evening. There was about 5,000 spectators. But according to whom told me they had attended the match, there are enough people to fill three River Plate stadiums.

— Ferreyra about the match v San Lorenzo, when he scored 3 goals playing for Tigre

== Honours ==
River Plate

- Primera División: 1932, 1936 (Copa Campeonato), 1936 (Copa de Oro), 1937
- Copa de Competencia (LAF): 1932
- Copa Ibarguren: 1937
- Copa Aldao: 1936, 1937

Argentina

- Copa América: 1937

Individual

- Primera División Top Scorer: 1932 LAF
