= Sebastián Gualco =

Argentine footballer

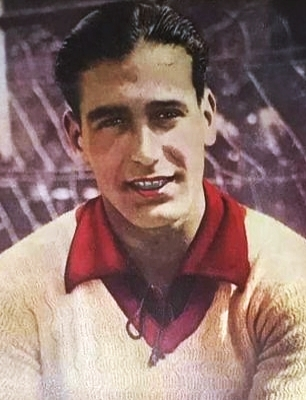
- Gualco in 1934

Personal information
- Date of birth: 26 April 1912
- Date of death: 6 November 1992 (aged 80)
- Position: Goalkeeper

Senior career*
Years	Team	Apps	(Gls)
1931–33	Platense		
1934–36	San Lorenzo		
1937	Chacarita Juniors		
1938–40	San Lorenzo		
1941–45	Ferro Carril Oeste		
1936	Huracán		

International career
1935–1943	Argentina	23	(0)
- * Club domestic league appearances and goals

Sebastián Gualco (26 April 1912 6 November 1992) was an Argentine footballer. He played in 23 matches for the Argentina national football team from 1935 to 1943. He was also part of Argentina's squad for the 1935 South American Championship.

== Honours ==
San Lorenzo

- Argentine Primera División: 1936 Copa de Honor

Argentina

- Copa América: 1941
