= José Manuel Moreno =

Argentine footballer (1916–1978)

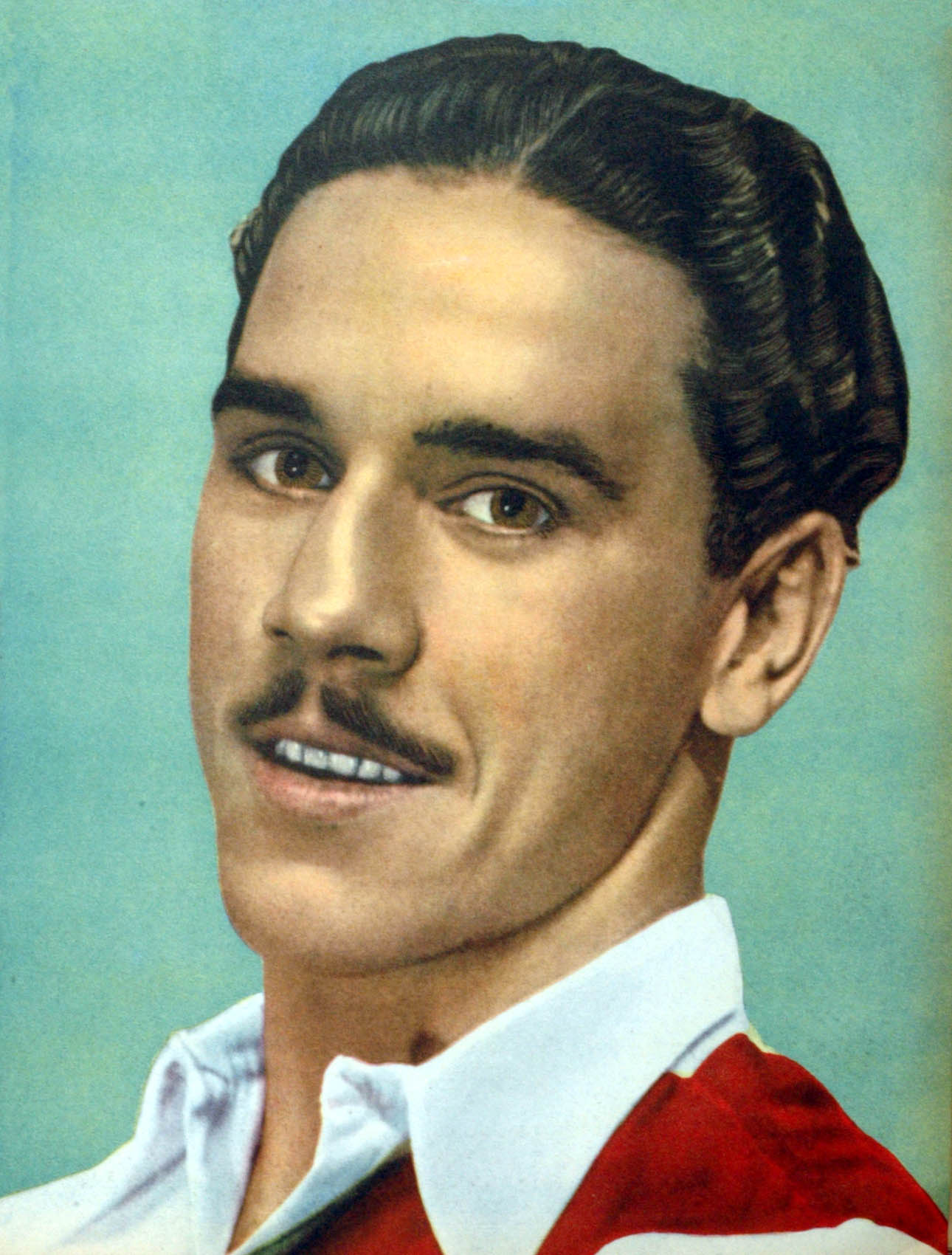
- Moreno on the cover of El Gráfico magazine in 1941

Personal information
- Full name: Jose Manuel Moreno Fernandez
- Date of birth: 3 August 1916
- Place of birth: Buenos Aires, Argentina
- Date of death: 26 August 1978 (aged 62)
- Place of death: Merlo, Argentina
- Position: Inside forward

Senior career*
Years	Team	Apps	(Gls)
1935–1944	River Plate	256	(156)
1944–1946	España	41	(11)
1946–1948	River Plate	64	(24)
1949	U. Católica	22	(8)
1950	Boca Juniors	22	(6)
1951	U. Católica	12	(2)
1952	Defensor	14	(3)
1953	Ferrocarril Oeste	15	(1)
1954–1957	Independiente Medellín	40	(12)
1960–1961	Independiente Medellín	3	(1)
Total		489	(224)

International career
1936–1950	Argentina	34	(19)
- * Club domestic league appearances and goals

José Manuel Moreno Fernández (3 August 1916 – 26 August 1978), nicknamed "El Charro", was an Argentine footballer who played as an inside forward for several clubs in Argentina, Mexico, Chile, and Colombia; for those who saw him play, he is regarded as one of the greatest players of all time, even compared to Alfredo Di Stéfano, Pelé and Diego Maradona, and was the first footballer ever to have won first division league titles in four countries (later players to emulate the feat include Jiri Jarosik, Rivaldo, Zlatan Ibrahimović, James Rodríguez and Alexis Sánchez).

Moreno was part of the River Plate team known as La Máquina ("The Machine") which dominated Argentine football in the 1940s, and was also a member of the Argentina national team that won the South American Championships in 1941 and 1947, being chosen in the latter tournament as the best player of the tournament.

He was regarded by many as a complete player. In 1999, he was ranked as the 5th best South American player in the 20th century (behind Pelé, Maradona, Di Stéfano and Garrincha), and among the 25 best players in the world through a poll by the IFFHS. He was known as a player of great technique, great vision, and lethal in the penalty area. Despite his reputation for drinking, smoking and not going to training, Moreno was also known for his formidable heading ability, scoring 75 with his head, he also had fine physical qualities.

== Club career ==
Moreno was born in the neighbourhood of La Boca, in Buenos Aires, and grew up in the surroundings of the club Boca Juniors' stadium, La Bombonera. At the age of 15, he tried out for the lower divisions of Boca Juniors, but did not make the selection.

According to the Argentine Football Association archives, he said, frustrated: "some time you will regret it". Moreno then became part of the lower divisions of River Plate, Boca Junior's arch-rival, in 1933, having been recommended by Bernabé Ferreyra, a notable forward for River Plate.

=== River Plate (1935–1944) ===
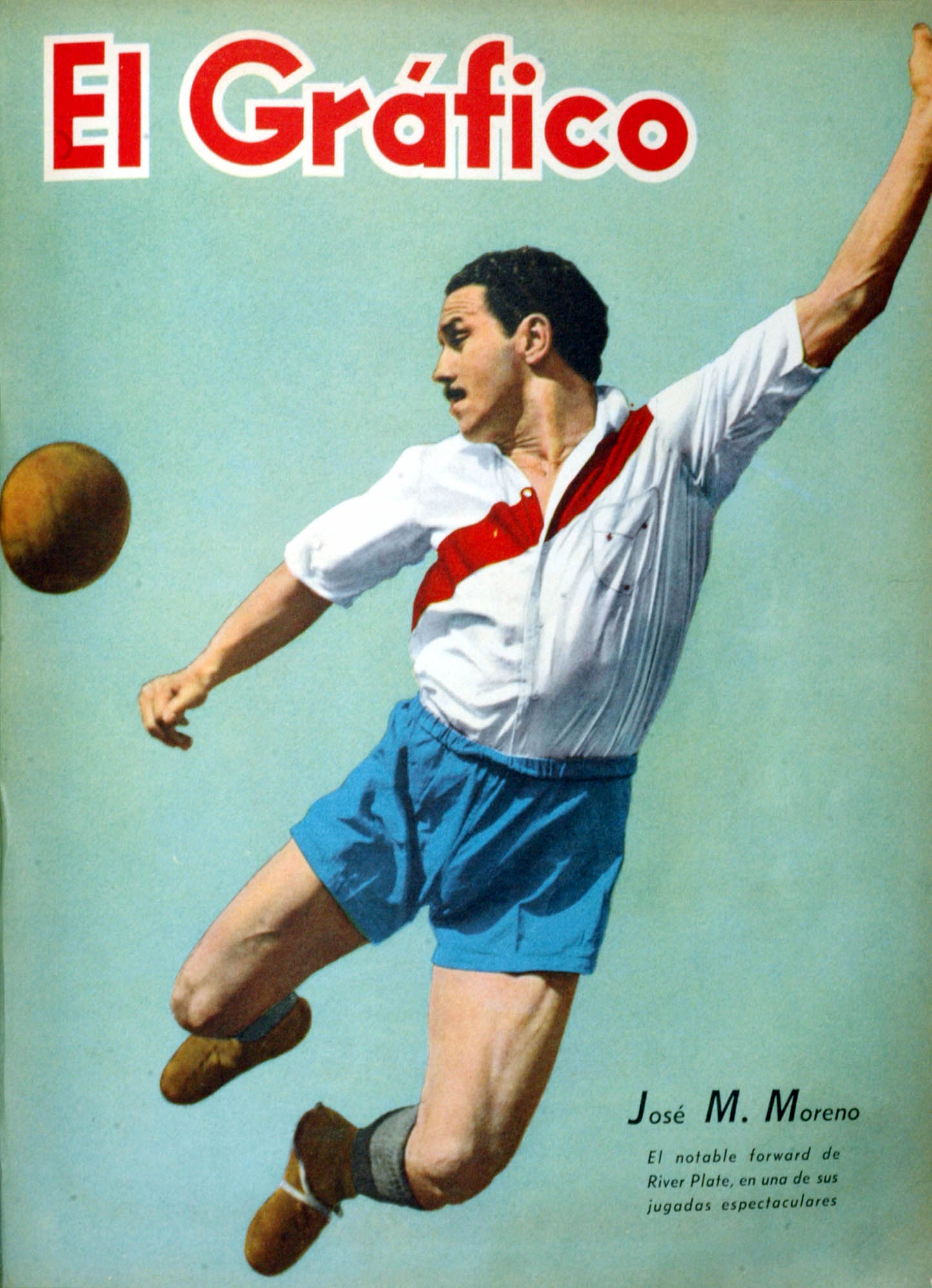
Moreno on the cover of El Gráfico magazine, October 1941

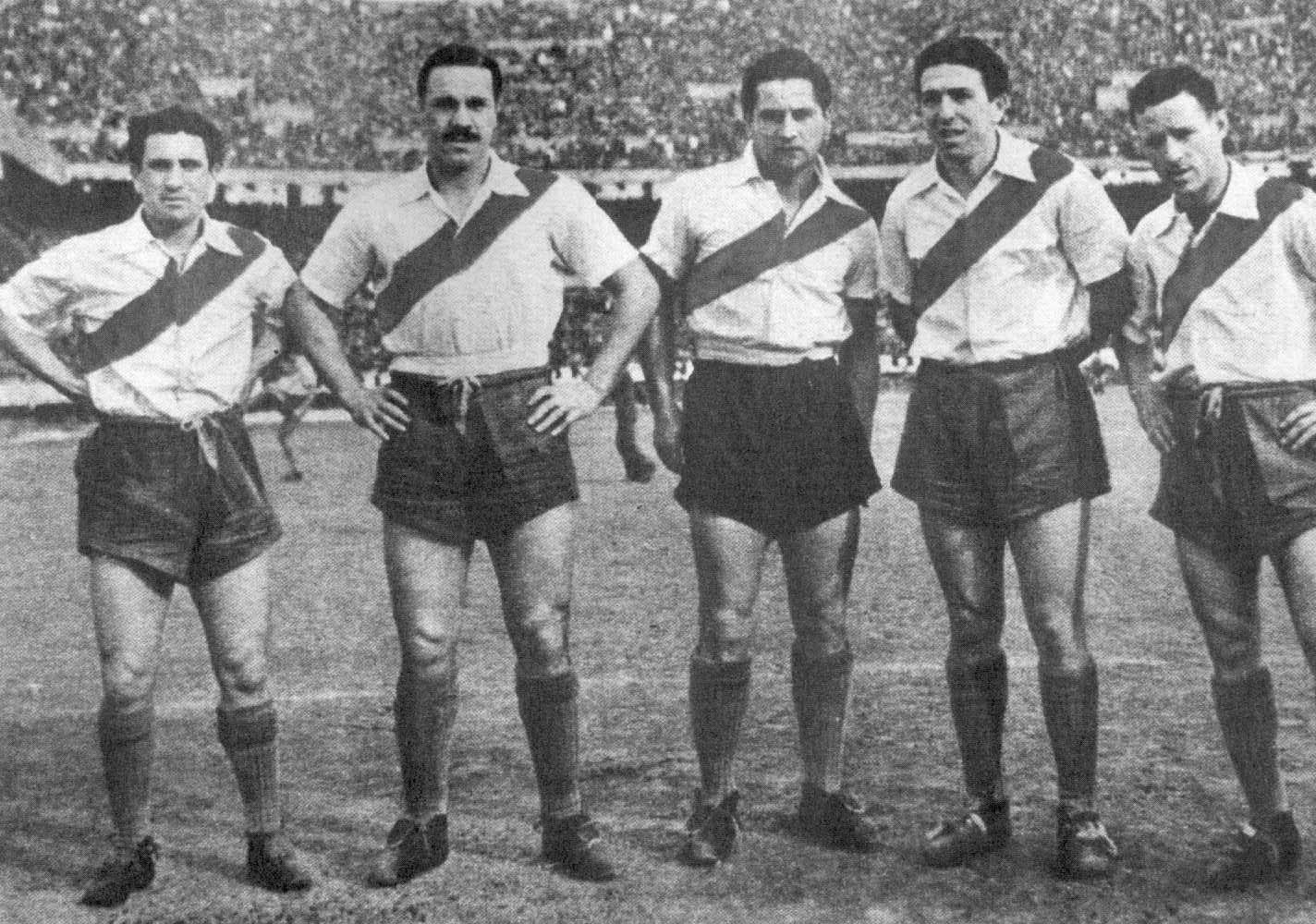
Offensive line of "La Máquina": Juan Carlos Muñoz, José Manuel Moreno, Adolfo Pedernera, Angel Labruna and Félix Loustau

At the age of 18, Moreno was selected along with other young players from the club by manager Emérico Hirschl to make a tour in Brazil. His first competitive appearance was against Brazilian side Botafogo. He debuted in Primera División on March 17, 1935, in a 2–1 win against C.A. Platense, scoring one goal.

Quickly become the greatest figure of Argentine football, he was part of the squad that won league titles in 1936 and 1937, and went on to become a key player among Adolfo Pedernera on the River Plate squad known as La Máquina, famous for his line of attack composed by Moreno, Pedernera, Ángel Labruna, Juan Carlos Muñoz, and Félix Loustau, and which dominated Argentine football during the first half of the 1940s decade, winning with Moreno two national titles (1941, 1942) and many Aldao Cups.

=== Mexico (1944–1946) ===
In 1944, Moreno was transferred to México Primera División club España, who had finished runner up to Asturias, first Mexican league champions in the 1943–44 season. With España, Moreno won the national title in the 1945–46 season. His time and success in Mexico earned him the nickname Charro, which is also the term used to refer to the traditional cowboy of Mexico.

=== Return to South America (1946–1961) ===
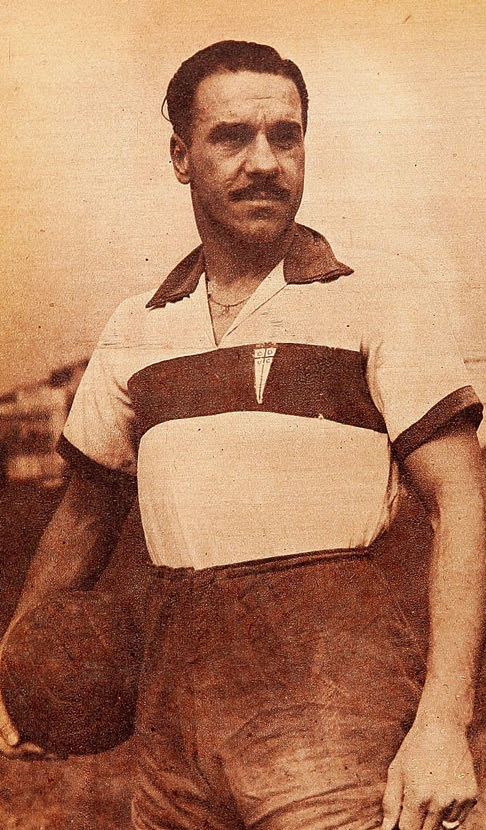
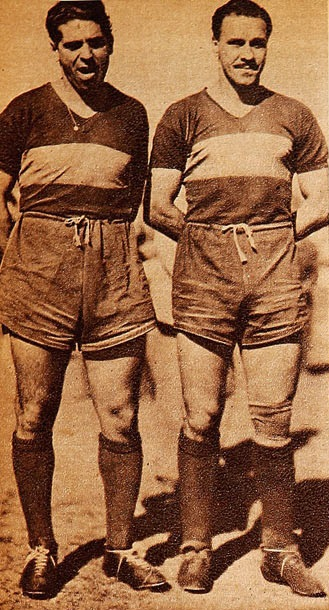
(Left): Moreno with Chilean team Universidad Católica, 1949; (right): Moreno (right) with Rinaldo Martino during his brief tenure on Boca Juniors, 1950

Moreno returned to his homeland and River Plate for the latter part of 1946. His second tenure at River lasted three seasons. Champion again in 1947, already with Alfredo Di Stéfano as center forward, he returned to emigrate after the strike of 1948 players. He was transferred to Universidad Católica of Chile, where in the same year he helped the team win its first league title.

He returned to Argentina in 1950, this time to play for Boca Juniors, and the following year, he played again for Universidad Católica. He also played one season in Uruguay, with Primera División team Defensor. In 1953, he went back to Argentina to join Ferrocarril Oeste.

==== Colombia ====
Moreno moved to Colombia in 1954, joining Independiente Medellín, where he would end his playing career. He was both a player and a manager for the club. He won the Colombian championship in 1955, becoming the only footballer to have won league titles in four countries' leagues, doing so in Argentina, Mexico, Chile, and Colombia. In 1957, he won his last – and 12th overall – first division title. He retired with Independiente Medellín in a friendly match against Boca Juniors in 1961, a match during which he participated both as coach and player. Independiente won the match 5–2, and Moreno scored one goal.

== International career ==
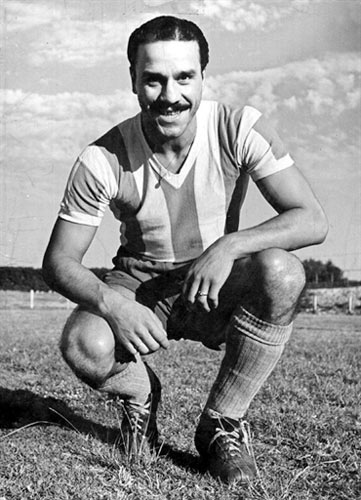
Moreno with the Argentina national team

Moreno was a member of the Argentina national team from 1936 to 1950, earning 34 caps and scoring 19 goals. Moreno was part of the winning squads at the South American Championships (now Copa América) of 1941, 1942 and 1947. He scored the tournament's milestone goal number 500 in an atypical match against Ecuador: he scored five goals in that match, a Copa América record which he shares with Héctor Scarone (Uruguay), Juan Marvezzi (Argentina) and Evaristo (Brazil). That day, Argentina beat Ecuador 12–0, which is also the largest goal difference in a single Copa América match.

Moreno was the top goalscorer of the 1942 South American Championship with seven goals, along with Herminio Masantonio, and was chosen best player of the 1947 edition. He is also tied for third place among the Copa América's all-time top scorers, with 13 overall goals.

== Managerial career ==
His first significant stint in coaching occurred in Colombia with Independiente Medellín. In 1955, acting as a player-manager, he led the club to the Colombian championship. This historic achievement made him the first footballer to win league titles in four different countries (Argentina, Mexico, Chile, and Colombia). He would later return to manage the Colombian outfit again between 1960 and 1961, officially retiring as a player during a friendly match against Boca Juniors where he both played and coached.

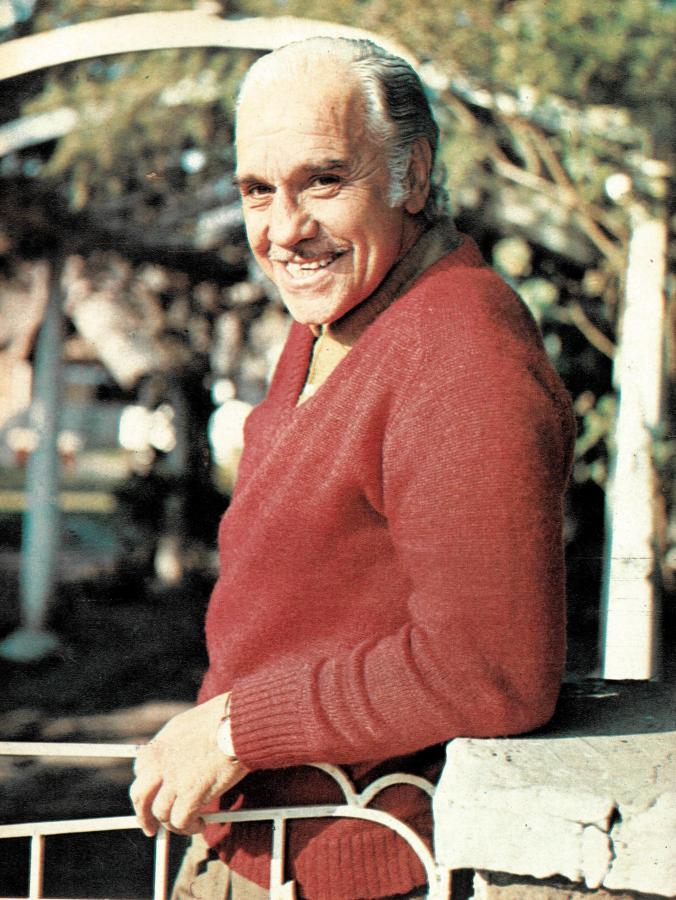
Moreno in his later years c. 1970

In his native Argentina, Moreno's first pure managerial role came in 1958 when he was appointed co-manager of Boca Juniors alongside Bernardo Gandulla. The following year, his stature in the domestic game earned him the prestigious role of managing the Argentina national football team. Although his tenure with the Albiceleste in 1959 was relatively brief, it highlighted the immense respect he commanded within the Argentine Football Association. Continuing his deep ties with South American football, Moreno also crossed the Andes to manage the Chilean powerhouse Colo-Colo, bringing his extensive tactical experience to a country where he was already revered from his playing days with Universidad Católica.

Throughout the 1960s and 1970s, Moreno remained deeply involved in the Argentine domestic circuit, taking the helm at traditional clubs such as Huracán and All Boys. However, his most sentimental and enduring managerial chapter occurred at the end of his life with Deportivo Merlo. He took charge of the lower-division side in late 1976 and managed them until his passing from liver failure in August 1978. Known for his unique style, Moreno would often deliver his tactical team talks in the dressing room and then watch the matches from behind the perimeter wire fence alongside the fans. His impact on the club was so profound that following his death, Deportivo Merlo renamed their ground the Estadio José Manuel Moreno in his honor, and the team permanently adopted the nickname "Los Charros" as a direct tribute to their iconic manager.

== Honours ==
River Plate

- Argentine Primera División (6): 1936 Copa Campeonato, 1936 Copa de Oro, 1937, 1941, 1942, 1947
- Copa Aldao: 1936, 1937, 1941, 1947
- Copa Ibarguren: 1937, 1942, 1952
- Copa Adrián C. Escobar: 1941

RC España

- Mexican Primera División: 1944–45

Universidad Católica

- Campeonato Nacional: 1949

Independiente Medellín

- Campeonato Profesional: 1955, 1957

Argentina

- South American Championship: 1941, 1947

Individual

- South American Championship top scorer: 1942 among Herminio Masantonio
- South American Championship Best Player: 1947
- Best Player of Chile: 1949
- "Premio Konex de Platino" 1980
- He was selected among the 25 best players in the world in the 20th century by the IFFHS in 1999. He also ranked as the fifth best player in South America, and as the third best in Argentina, behind Diego Maradona and Alfredo Di Stéfano.
- IFFHS Argentina All Times Dream Team (Team B): 2021
