= 1937 Copa Aldao =

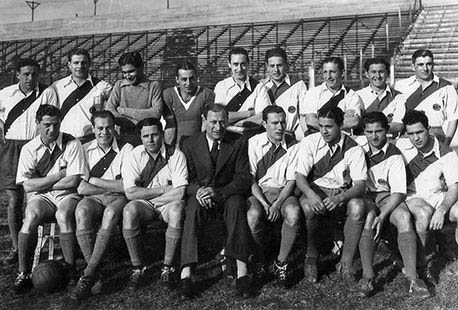
- A River Plate team of 1937
- Event: Copa Aldao
River Plate	Peñarol
(Argentina)	(Uruguay)
5	2
- Date: 15 January 1938
- Venue: Estadio de San Lorenzo, Buenos Aires
- Referee: Bartolomé Macías (Uruguay)

The 1937 Copa Aldao was the final match to decide the winner of the Copa Aldao, the tenth edition of the international competition organised by the Argentine and Uruguayan Associations together. The final was contested by the same teams than the previous edition, Uruguayan club Peñarol and Argentine club River Plate.

The match was played at San Lorenzo Stadium in Buenos Aires, where River Plate achieved another conclusive victory of 5–2 over Peñarol, winning its second consecutive Copa Aldao Trophy.

== Qualified teams ==
Team	Qualification	Previous final app.
(Argentina) River Plate	1937 Primera División champions	**1936**
(Uruguay) Peñarol	1937 Primera División champions	1918, **1928**, 1936

- **Bold** indicates winning years

== Venue ==
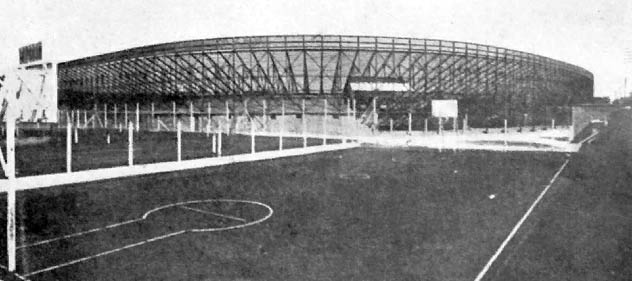
San Lorenzo de Almagro Stadium, venue

== Match ==
=== Summary ===
Argentine newspaper Crítica chronicled the match stating that River Plate showed a distinctive football class in several moments of the match, being superior than their rivals in most of its parts. Crítica also affirmed that River players were faster than their oponents because of their admirable [sic] physical condition.

The first minutes of the match showed imprecissions and nervous from both sides, with River being more agressive and Peñarol plsaying calm, nevertheless the Argentine side improved their movements as time went by, with a better attitude to get the offense. That aincreassing agreesive playing style from River Plate (with Bernabé Ferreyra making several attempts to the opponents' goal) caused the Argentine team scored three goals before the first half ended, one by Eladio Vaschetto and two by Ferreyra himself.

The wide lead took by River Plate (not only in the score but in their physical condition, in contrast to that of Peñarol players) resulted in the team dominating the game during almost the entire second half, showing an elegant style of play especially in the midfield

=== Details ===
1937 Copa Aldao
15 Jan 1938

River Plate (Argentina)	5–2	(Uruguay) Peñarol
Vaschetto 15'; Ferreyra 28', 44'; Pedernera 60'; Moreno 81'	Report	Camaití 55', 83'

Estadio de San Lorenzo, Buenos Aires
Referee: Bartolomé Macías (Uruguay)

**River Plate**	**Peñarol**

GK	(Argentina) Sebastián Sirni
DF	(Argentina) Luis Vassini
DF	(Argentina) Alberto Cuello
MF	(Argentina) Esteban Malazzo
MF	(Argentina) José M. Minella
MF	(Argentina) Aarón Wergifker
FW	(Argentina) Carlos Peucelle
FW	(Argentina) Enrique Vaschetto
FW	(Argentina) Bernabé Ferreyra
FW	(Argentina) José M. Moreno
FW	(Argentina) Adolfo Pedernera
Manager:
(Hungary) Imre Hirschl

GK	(Uruguay) Julio Barrios
DF	(Uruguay) Jorge Clulow
DF	(Brazil) Mario Barrada
MF	(Uruguay) Erebo Zunino
MF	(Uruguay) Álvaro Gestido
MF	(Uruguay) Raúl Rodríguez
FW	(Uruguay) Miguel A. Lauri
FW	(Uruguay) Luis Mata
FW	(Uruguay) Pedro Lago
FW	(Uruguay) Severino Varela
FW	(Uruguay) Adelaido Camaití
Manager:
(Uruguay) Athuel Velásquez
