= 1932 Copa de Competencia (LAF) Final =

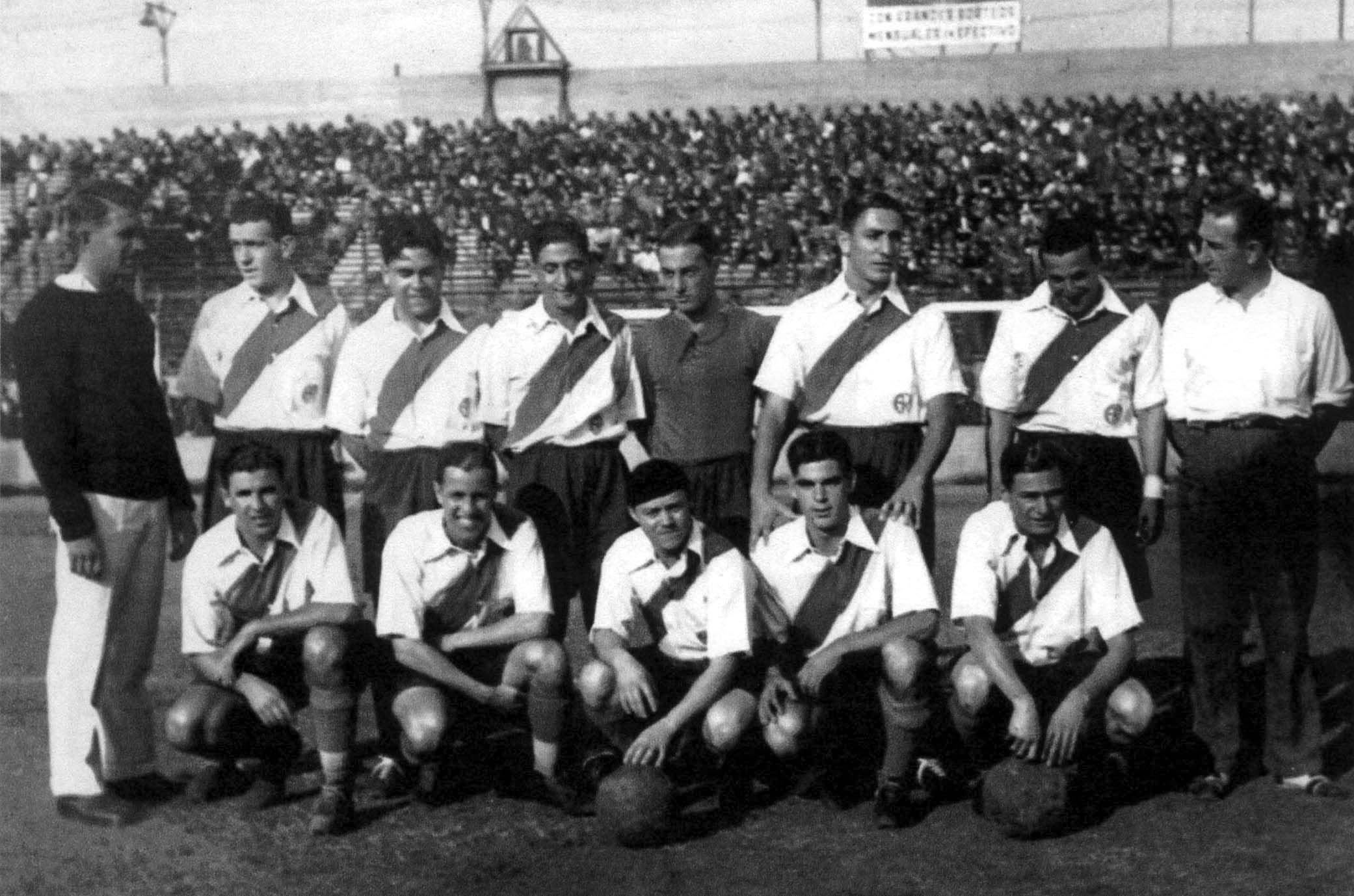
- A River Plate team of 1932
- Event: Copa Competencia (LAF)
River Plate	Estudiantes (LP)
3	1
- Date: December 4, 1932
- Venue: San Lorenzo
- Referee: Eduardo Forte

The 1932 Copa de Competencia Final was the final that decide the winner of the 1st edition of Copa de Competencia, an Argentine domestic cup organised by dissident body Liga Argentina de Football, the first professional league of Argentina.

The final was held in San Lorenzo de Almagro Stadium on December 4, 1932. River Plate defeated Estudiantes de La Plata 3–1 winning their first Copa de Competencia title.

== Qualified teams ==
Team	Previous finals app.
River Plate	(none)
Estudiantes (LP)	(none)

== Overview ==
This first edition was contested by all the 18 teams that took part in the Primera División league season, in a single elimination format. River Plate beat Racing 1–0 at Estadio Gasómetro, Atlanta 4–1 at Platense, Lanús (0–0, 4–3 playoff in semifinals).

On the other hand, Estudiantes beat Ferro Carril Oeste 5–3 at Racing Stadium, Tigre 3–1 at Huracán, and Huracán 3–1 in semifinals (also at Racing).

== Road to the final ==
Note: all the matches played in neutral venues.

River Plate		Round	Estudiantes (LP)	
Opponent	Result	Stage	Opponent	Result
Racing Club	1–0	First Round	Ferro Carril Oeste	5–3
Atlanta	4–1	Second round	Tigre	3–1
Lanús	0–0, 4–3 (Note: Playoff.)	Semifinal	Huracán	3–1

== Match details ==
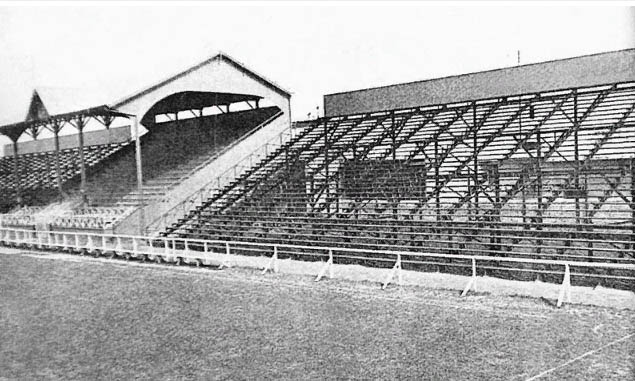
San Lorenzo Stadium, venue

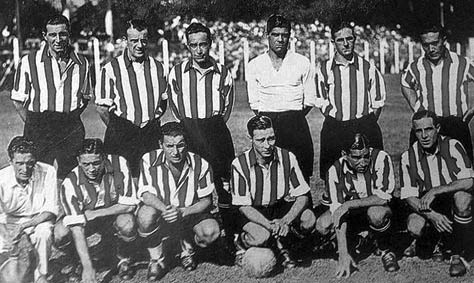
A Estudiantes LP team of 1932

1932 Copa Competencia (LAF) Final
December 4, 1932
Final

River Plate	3–1	Estudiantes (LP)
Peucelle 11'; Ferreyra 49', 79'	Report	Guaita 48'

San Lorenzo, Buenos Aires
Referee: Eduardo Forte

River Plate	Estudiantes LP

GK	(Argentina) Sebastián Sirni
DF	(Argentina) Roberto Basílico
DF	(Argentina) Alberto Cuello
MF	(Argentina) Esteban Malazzo
MF	(Argentina) Manuel Dañil
MF	(Argentina) Carlos Santamaría
FW	(Argentina) Ricardo Zatelli
FW	(Uruguay) Pedro Lago
FW	(Argentina) Bernabé Ferreyra
FW	(Argentina) Carlos Peucelle
FW	(Argentina) Nazareno Luna
Manager:
(Argentina) Víctor Caamaño

GK	(Argentina) Emir Latorre
DF	(Argentina) Ramón Rodríguez
DF	(Argentina) Armando Neri
MF	(Argentina) Ubaldo Viola
MF	(Uruguay) Ulises Uslenghi
MF	(Uruguay) Carlos Riolfo
FW	(Argentina) Miguel A. Lauri
FW	(Argentina) Alejandro Scopelli
FW	(Argentina) Alberto Zozaya
FW	(Argentina) Manuel Ferreira
FW	(Argentina) Enrique Guaita
Manager:
(Argentina) Jaime Rottman
