= 1937 Copa Ibarguren =

- River Plate team, champions
River Plate	Rosario Central
5	0
- Date: January 8, 1938; 88 years ago
- Venue: San Lorenzo Stadium, Buenos Aires
- Man of the Match: Bernabé Ferreyra
- Referee: Isaac Caswell

The 1937 Copa Ibarguren was the 14th. edition of this National cup of Argentina. It was played by the champions of both leagues, Primera División and Asociación Rosarina de Fútbol crowned during 1937, after a hiatus of 12 years.

River Plate (Primera División champion) faced Rosario Central (Liga Rosarina champion) at San Lorenzo de Almagro's venue, Estadio Gasómetro, in the Boedo neighborhood of Buenos Aires, on January 8, 1938. With three goals by striker Bernabé Ferreyra, River thrashed Central 5–0 and won its first Copa Ibarguren trophy.

== Qualified teams ==
Team	Qualification	Previous appearances
River Plate	1937 Primera División champion	(none)
Rosario Central	1937 Asociación Rosarina champion	**1915**, 1916, 1917, 1919, 1923

- **Bold** indicates winning years

== Match details ==
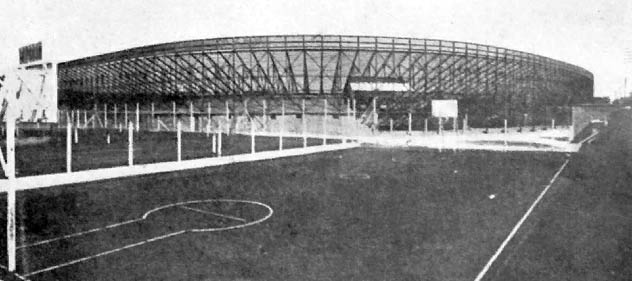
San Lorenzo stadium, venue

Team of Rosario Central

1937 Copa Ibarguren
1 January 1938

River Plate	5–0	Rosario Central
Ferreyra 50', 70', 73'; Pedernera 77'; Moreno 80'	Report

San Lorenzo Stadium, Buenos Aires
Referee: Isaac Caswell

**River Plate**	**Rosario Central**

GK	(Argentina) Sebastián Sirni
DF	(Argentina) Luis Vassini
DF	(Argentina) Alberto Cuello	Red card
MF	(Argentina) Esteban Malazzo
MF	(Argentina) José María Minella
MF	(Brazil) (Argentina) Aarón Wergifker
FW	(Argentina) Carlos Peucelle
FW	(Argentina) Eladio Vaschetto
FW	(Argentina) Bernabé Ferreyra
FW	(Argentina) José Manuel Moreno
FW	(Argentina) Adolfo Pedernera
Manager:
(Hungary) Imre Hirschl

GK	(Argentina) Pedro Araiz
DF	(Argentina) Julio Lezcano
DF	(Argentina) Ignacio Díaz
MF	(Argentina) Rafael Luongo
MF	(Argentina) German Gaitán
MF	(Argentina) Alberto Espeche
FW	(Argentina) Agustín Gómez
FW	(Argentina) Salvador Laporta
FW	(Argentina) Humberto Maffei	Red card
FW	(Argentina) Roberto D'Alessandro
FW	(Argentina) Aníbal Maffei
Manager:
(Argentina) Juan Fraunhoffer
