= Segundo Villadóniga =

Uruguayan footballer (1915-2006)

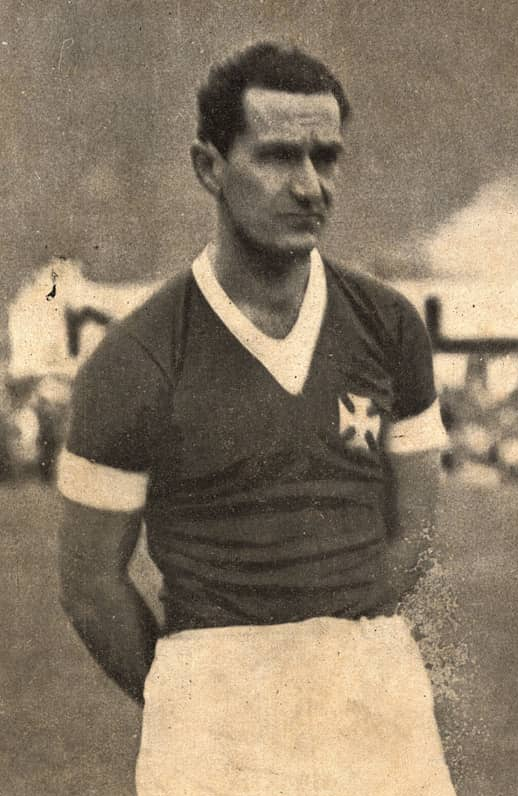

Personal information
- Full name: Segundo Villadóniga
- Date of birth: 6 November 1915
- Place of birth: Uruguay
- Date of death: 26 October 2006 (aged 90)
- Position: Attacking midfielder

Senior career*
Years	Team	Apps	(Gls)
1930–1931	Cerro	?	(2)
1932–1933	Montevideo Wanderers	6	(0)
1935–1938	Peñarol	42	(15)
1938–1942	Vasco da Gama	?	(85)
1942–1946	Palmeiras	138	(52)
1947	Peñarol	9	(6)
1948	Cerro	7	(0)

International career
	Uruguay	6	(2)
- * Club domestic league appearances and goals

Segundo Villadóniga (6 November 1915 – 26 October 2006) was a Uruguayan footballer who played as an attacking midfielder.

== Honours ==
- Peñarol
  - Uruguayan Primera División: 1935, 1936, 1937
- Palmeiras
  - Campeonato Paulista: 1942, 1944
