= Aarón Wergifker =

Brazilian-born, naturalized Argentine footballer (1914-1994)

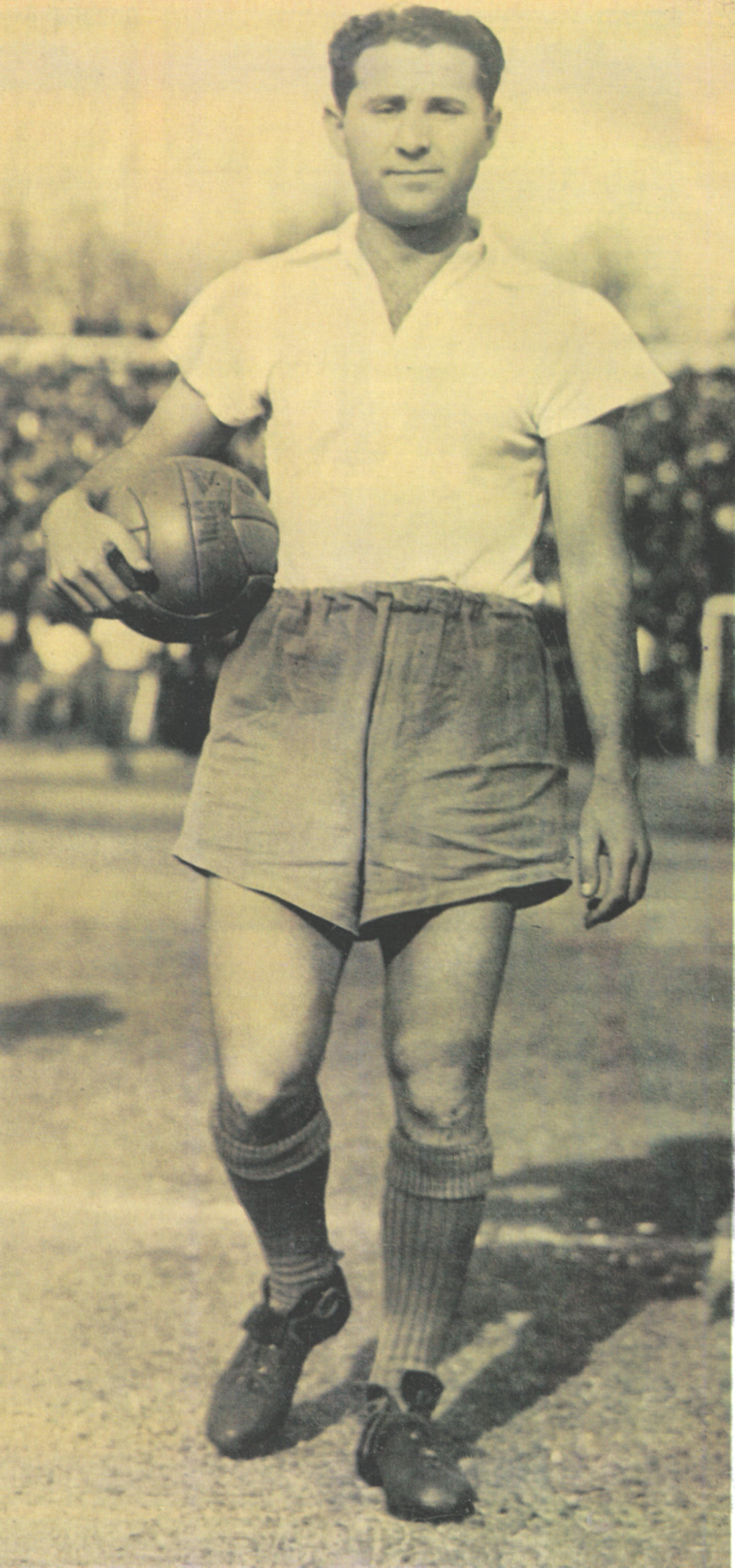

Personal information
- Full name: Aarón Wergifker
- Date of birth: August 15, 1914
- Place of birth: São Paulo, Brazil
- Date of death: June 29, 1994
- Place of death: Buenos Aires, Argentina
- Position: Defender

Senior career*
| Years | Team | Apps | (Gls) |
| 1932–1941 | River Plate | 203 | (3) |
| 1942–1946 | Platense | 112 | (0) |

International career
| 1934–1936 | Argentina | 4 | (0) |
- * Club domestic league appearances and goals

Aarón Wergifker (August 15, 1914 – June 29, 1994) was a Brazil-born, naturalized Argentine professional football player, who played as a defender. Wergifker was the first Jewish player to play for the Argentina national football team.

== Career ==
Born in São Paulo, Wergifker moved to Argentina shortly after birth and started his career playing for Club Atlético River Plate from 1932 to 1941 and Club Atlético Platense from 1942 to 1946. He also played for the Argentina national team, appearing in four matches from 1934 to 1936.
