= Alberto Chividini =

Argentine footballer

Personal information
- Full name: Alberto Rodolfo Chividini
- Date of birth: 23 February 1907
- Place of birth: Buenos Aires, Argentina
- Date of death: 31 October 1961 (aged 54)
- Height: 1.81 m (5 ft 11 1/2 in)
- Position: Defender

Senior career*
Years	Team	Apps	(Gls)
1928–1929	Central Norte		
1929–1930	Estudiantil Porteño		
1930	→ Vélez Sársfield (loan)	0	(0)
1931–1933	Unión (SF)		
1933–1937	San Lorenzo	124	(7)
1938	Estudiantil Porteño	14	(0)
1939–1942	Gimnasia y Tiro		

International career
1928–1930	Argentina	3	(0)

Managerial career
- 1950: Colón
- 1961: Defensores de Belgrano
Medal record
Men's Football
Representing Argentina
Copa América
Winner	1929 Argentina	Team
FIFA World Cup
Runner-up	1930 Uruguay	Team
- * Club domestic league appearances and goals

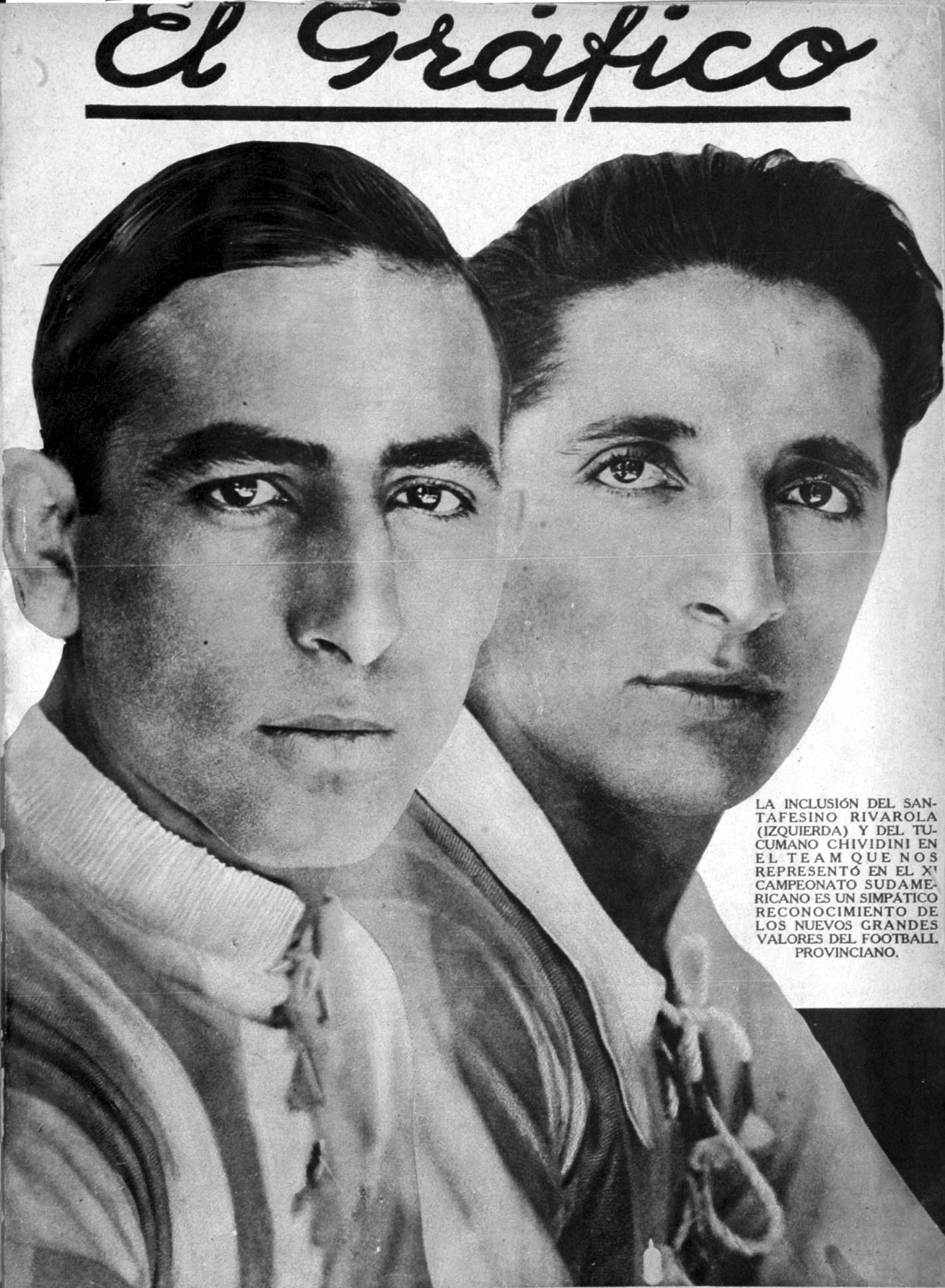
Rivarola y Chividini (Argentina selection) - El Gráfico 541.jpg

Alberto Rodolfo Chividini (23 February 1907 – 31 October 1961) was an Argentine football defender. He made appearances in three games of the Argentina national team between 1928 and 1930: one in the 1930 FIFA World Cup and two in the 1929 South American Championship (where he was champion).

== Honours ==
Central Norte

- Liga Tucumana de Fútbol: 1924 Competencia, 1925, 1929

Unión de Santa Fe

- Liga Santafesina de Fútbol: 1932

San Lorenzo

- Argentine Primera División: 1933 LAF, 1936 Copa de Honor

Argentina

- 1929 South American Championship
- FIFA World Cup runner-up: 1930
