= 1936 Copa Aldao =

- River Plate, champions
- Event: Copa Aldao
Peñarol	River Plate
(Uruguay)	(Argentina)
1	5
- Date: Mar 20, 1937
- Venue: Estadio Centenario, Montevideo
- Referee: Martín Aphesteguy (Uruguay)

The 1936 Copa Aldao was the final match to decide the winner of the Copa Aldao, the ninth edition of the international competition organised by the Argentine and Uruguayan Associations together. The final was contested by Uruguayan club Peñarol and Argentine club River Plate.

River Plate contested the match as the winner of "Copa de Oro", a cup that decided which team would participate in the final as the 1936 Argentine Primera División season had crowned two champions, River Plate and San Lorenzo. After River beat San Lorenzo 3–1, the team was eligible to play the 1936 edition of Copa Aldao.

The match was played at Estadio Centenario in Montevideo, where River Plate achieved a conclusive victory of 5–1 over Peñarol, winning its first Copa Aldao Trophy.

== Qualified teams ==
Team	Qualification	Previous final app.
(Uruguay) Peñarol	1936 Uruguayan Primera División champion	1918, **1928**
(Argentina) River Plate	1936 Argentine Primera División champion (Note: As the 1936 season had crowned two champions –River Plate (Copa Campeonato) and San Lorenzo (Copa de Honor)–, both teams played a final named "Copa de Oro", won by River Plate, which was mentioned as "Argentine champion" on the AFA Annual Report of that year. Nevertheless, some historians state this cup was only established to qualify an Argentine representative to play the Copa Aldao against the Uruguayan champion, with some issues still under discussion.)	(none)

- **Bold** indicates winning years

== Venue ==
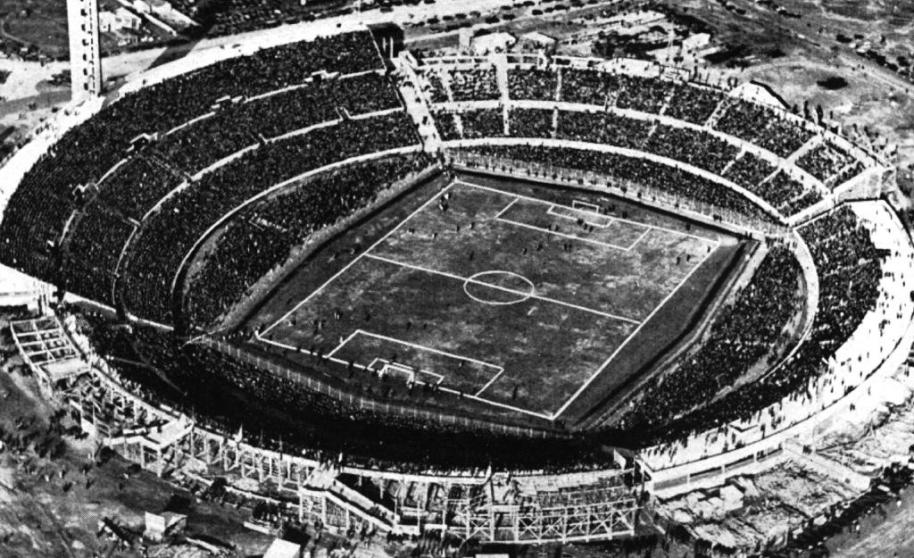
Estadio Centenario, venue

The match was held in Estadio Centenario, built between 1929 and 1930 to host the inaugural 1930 FIFA World Cup. It is listed by FIFA as one of the football world's classic stadiums.

The final match of the inaugural World Cup matched Uruguay and Argentina, with Uruguay winning 4–2. Since then, the Centenario has been the scene of several editions of Copa América and South American Youth Championship, and even 1980 Mundialito, among other competitons.

== Match details ==
Team of Peñarol (left) and some moments of the match held in Estadio Centenario
1936 Copa Aldao
20 March 1937

Peñarol (Uruguay)	1–5	(Argentina) River Plate
Varela 60'	Report	Ferreyra 14', 84'; Pedernera 38', 65'; Peucelle 70'

Estadio Centenario, Montevideo
Referee: Martín Aphesteguy (Uruguay)

**Peñarol**	**River Plate**

GK	(Uruguay) Enrique Ballesteros
DF	(Uruguay) Carlos Scandroglio
DF	(Brazil) Mario Barrada
MF	(Uruguay) Erebo Zunino
MF	(Uruguay) Álvaro Gestido
MF	(Uruguay) Galileo Chanes
FW	(Uruguay) Alberto Taboada
FW	(Uruguay) Severino Varela
FW	(Uruguay) Pedro Lago
FW	(Uruguay) Segundo Villadóniga
FW	(Uruguay) Adelaido Camaití
Manager:
(Uruguay) Athuel Velázquez

GK	(Argentina) Sebastián Sirni
DF	(Argentina) Luis Vassini
DF	(Argentina) Alberto Cuello
MF	(Argentina) Esteban Malazzo
MF	(Argentina) Bruno Rodolfi
MF	(Argentina) Aarón Wergifker
FW	(Argentina) Carlos Peucelle
FW	(Italy) (Argentina) Renato Cesarini
FW	(Argentina) Bernabé Ferreyra
FW	(Argentina) José M. Moreno
FW	(Argentina) Adolfo Pedernera
Manager:
(Hungary) Imre Hirschl
