= Liga Argentina de Football =

Former football association in Argentina

Argentina
- Founded: 1931
- Folded: 1934; 91 years ago
- Headquarters: Buenos Aires
- FIFA affiliation: No
- President: List: Julio Planisi (1931); Eduardo Larrandart (1932-34); Tiburcio Padilla (1934)

The Liga Argentina de Football (LAF) was a dissident football association of Argentina that organised its own professional championships from 1931 to 1934. The Argentine Football Association (that had remained amateur) did not recognise those championships until both associations were merged in 1934. Currently all the championships organised by the LAF are considered officials by the AFA.

== History ==
At the beginning of the 1930s the Argentine footballers went on strike claiming for being free agents, due to a tacit agreement among the clubs establishing that none of them could hire a player without prior approval from the body. For that reason, clubs affiliated to Argentine Football Association met to discuss a proposal about creating a professional league.

The Racing Club representatives suggested to create a section with the most notable teams from Buenos Aires, Greater Buenos Aires and La Plata. That proposal was rejected by representatives from clubs outside Buenos Aires, who claimed for more federalisation. Finally, the parts could not reach an agreement, which resulted in a breakage into the Association. On May 19, 1931, "Liga Argentina de Football" was established, becoming the first professional football league ever in Argentina.

On the other hand, the official association (AFA) changed its name to "Asociación Argentina de Football (Amateurs y Profesionales)" and continued organising its own championships from 1931 to 1934, when both associations merged.

== Founding members ==
The professional league was established by the following clubs:

- Argentinos Juniors
- Atlanta
- Boca Juniors
- Chacarita Juniors
- Estudiantes (LP)
- Ferro Carril Oeste
- Gimnasia y Esgrima (LP)
- Huracán
- Independiente
- Lanús
- Platense
- Quilmes
- Racing
- River Plate
- San Lorenzo
- Talleres (BA)
- Tigre
- Vélez Sarsfield.

== Competitions ==
The LAF organised several competitions, as listed below:

- Primera División (1931–34)
- División Intermedia (1931–34)
- Segunda División (1931–34)
- Copa de Competencia (1932–33)
- Copa Beccar Varela (1932–33)

== Champions ==
=== First Division ===
Season	Champion
1931	Boca Juniors
1932	River Plate
1933	San Lorenzo
1934	Boca Juniors

=== Second Division ===
The LAF only organised one second division championship in 1934.

Season	Champion
1934	River Plate II

=== Copa Competencia ===
Season	Champion
1932	River Plate
1933	Racing

=== Copa Beccar Varela ===
Season	Champion
1932	Racing
1933	Central Córdoba (R)

== See also ==
- Federación Argentina de Football
- Asociación Amateurs de Football
- Football in Argentina

== Bibliography ==
- 38 Campeones del fútbol argentino 1891-2010 by Diego Estévez - Ediciones Continente (2010) - ISBN 978-950-754-301-2
