= Copa de Competencia (Liga Argentina) =

Copa Competencia (LAF)
- Organising body: LAF
- Founded: 1932
- Abolished: 1933; 92 years ago
- Region: Argentina
- Number of teams: 18 (1933)
- Last champions: Racing (1933)

The Copa de Competencia (Liga Argentina) was an Argentine official football cup competition organized by dissident "Liga Argentina de Football", the first professional association in the country established by clubs that had broken up with the official association (AFA).

This cup was one of several competitions named "Copa Competencia", with only two editions contested, in 1932 and 1933.

== Overview ==
The first and second editions were contested by all the 18 teams that also took part in the Primera División championship. The format of the championship was a single-elimination tournament in which teams played each other in one-off matches, with extra time used to decide the winner if necessary. It began with a round of 18 in which the winner of each game played against the winner of another match. This was followed by the quarter-finals, the semi-finals, and the final.

== Champions ==
Ed.	Year	Champion	Score	Runner-up	Venue	City
1	1932	River Plate	3–1	Estudiantes (LP)	San Lorenzo	Buenos Aires
2	1933	Racing	4–0	San Lorenzo	Chacarita Juniors	Buenos Aires

== Other tournaments ==
There were other competitions also named "Copa de Competencia", as follows:

- Copa de Competencia Jockey Club (1907–33)
- Copa de Competencia (Asociación Amateurs) (1920–26)
- Copa de Competencia Británica (1944–48)
