= 1937 Argentine Primera División =

46th season of top-tier football league in Argentina

Primera División
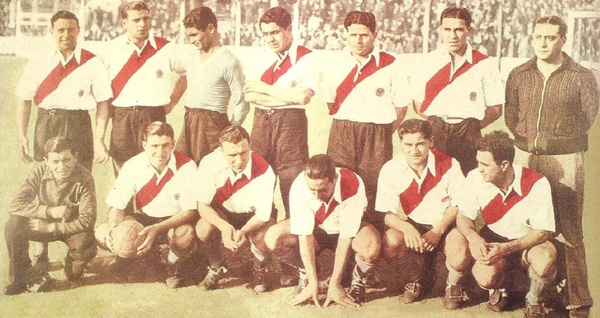
- River Plate, champion
- Season: 1937
- Dates: 4 April – 19 December
- Champions: River Plate (5th title)
- Relegated: Argentinos Jrs. Quilmes
- 1937 Copa Aldao: River Plate
- Top goalscorer: (Paraguay) Arsenio Erico (Independiente) (47 goals)

The 1937 Argentine Primera División was the 46th season of top-flight football in Argentina. The season began on April 4 and ended on December 19. There were 18 teams in the tournament, and River Plate won the championship.

Relegation system started this season, when it was ruled that the two worst placed teams would be relegated to Second Division. Those teams were Argentinos Juniors and Quilmes.

== Final table ==
Pos	Team	Pld	W	D	L	GF	GA	GD	Pts
1	River Plate	34	27	4	3	106	43	+63	58
2	Independiente	34	25	2	7	106	54	+52	52
3	Boca Juniors	34	20	5	9	101	57	+44	45
4	Racing	34	16	8	10	87	65	+22	40
5	Vélez Sarsfield	34	18	4	12	63	58	+5	40
6	San Lorenzo	34	15	9	10	70	62	+8	39
7	Huracán	34	17	4	13	82	62	+20	38
8	Gimnasia y Esgrima (LP)	34	16	5	13	68	60	+8	37
9	Ferro Carril Oeste	34	15	5	14	78	79	−1	35
10	Estudiantes (LP)	34	13	8	13	63	64	−1	34
11	Atlanta	34	12	7	15	61	66	−5	31
12	Platense	34	12	7	15	61	67	−6	31
13	Lanús	34	13	5	16	68	79	−11	31
14	Chacarita Juniors	34	10	9	15	63	76	−13	29
15	Talleres (RE)	34	10	6	18	60	88	−28	26
16	Tigre	34	11	3	20	62	84	−22	25
17	Argentinos Juniors	34	4	3	27	44	111	−67	11
18	Quilmes	34	3	4	27	42	110	−68	10

Source: rsssf.com
