= 1936 Argentine Primera División =

45th season of top-tier football league in Argentina

Primera División
- Season: 1936
- Dates: 5 April – 20 December
- Champions: Copa de Honor: San Lorenzo (5th. title); Copa Campeonato: River Plate (3rd. title); Copa de Oro: River Plate (4th. title)
- 1936 Copa Aldao: River Plate

The 1936 Argentine Primera División was the 45th season of top-flight football in Argentina. Two regular championships were disputed that year, "Copa de Honor" (won by San Lorenzo) and "Copa Campeonato" (won by River Plate).

At the end of the season, both champions, River and San Lorenzo, played a single match for the "Copa de Oro" trophy. River Plate won the match, that would be recognised as an additional league title.

== Final tables ==
=== Copa de Honor ===
Copa de Honor
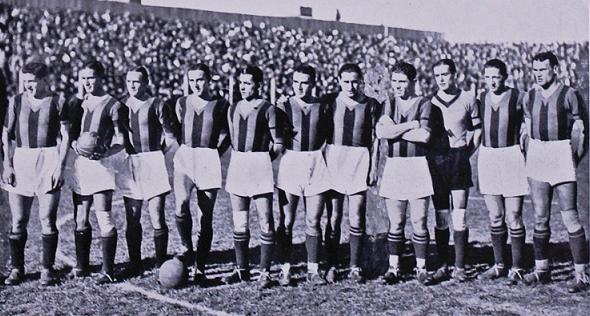
- San Lorenzo, Copa de Honor champions
- Season: 1936
- Dates: 5 April – 26 July
- Champions: San Lorenzo (5th title)
- Top goalscorer: (Argentina) Alberto Zozaya (Estudiantes (LP)) (16 goals)
- Biggest home win: Estudiantes (LP) 7–1 Tigre
- Biggest away win: Ferro 2–6 Independiente; Chacarita 2–6 S. Lorenzo

Pos	Team	Pld	W	D	L	GF	GA	GD	Pts
1	San Lorenzo	17	12	4	1	45	21	+24	28
2	Huracán	17	11	3	3	30	20	+10	25
3	Boca Juniors	17	10	4	3	36	17	+19	24
4	Vélez Sarsfield	17	10	2	5	40	25	+15	22
5	Independiente	17	9	4	4	35	35	0	22
6	River Plate	17	9	3	5	35	35	0	21
7	Atlanta	17	8	3	6	34	38	−4	19
8	Racing	17	8	2	7	34	38	−4	18
9	Quilmes	17	7	4	6	27	26	+1	18
10	Chacarita Juniors	17	7	4	6	31	31	0	18
11	Estudiantes (LP)	17	8	1	8	40	34	+6	17
12	Platense	17	6	4	7	23	26	−3	16
13	Ferro Carril Oeste	17	5	4	8	46	44	+2	14
14	Gimnasia y Esgrima (LP)	17	4	5	8	33	45	−12	13
15	Talleres (RE)	17	6	0	11	27	30	−3	12
16	Lanús	17	3	3	11	29	43	−14	9
17	Tigre	17	2	3	12	17	42	−25	7
18	Argentinos Juniors	17	1	1	15	15	54	−39	3

=== Copa Campeonato ===
Copa Campeonato
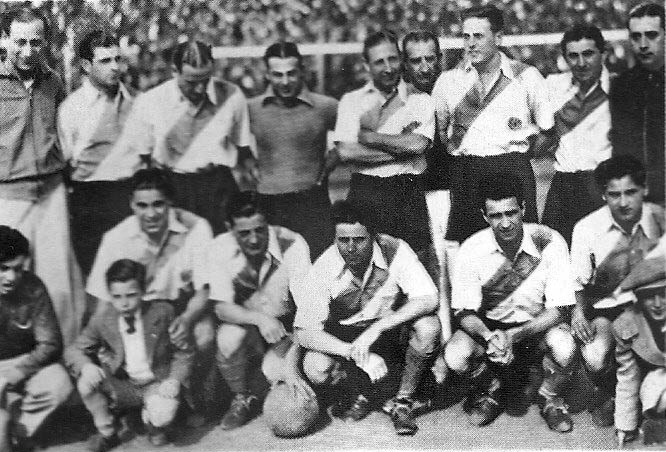
- River Plate, Copa Campeonato champion
- Season: 1936
- Dates: 16 August – 13 December
- Champions: River Plate (3rd title)
- Top goalscorer: (Argentina) Evaristo Barrera (Racing) (19 goals)
- Biggest home win: V. Sarsfield 8–1 Tigre
- Biggest away win: Chacarita 3–7 Independiente

Pos	Team	Pld	W	D	L	GF	GA	GD	Pts
1	River Plate	17	13	2	2	49	19	+30	28
2	San Lorenzo	17	11	2	4	41	24	+17	24
3	Racing	17	10	3	4	43	27	+16	23
4	Independiente	17	10	1	6	32	29	+3	21
5	Boca Juniors	17	9	2	6	39	19	+20	20
6	Atlanta	17	8	3	6	39	30	+9	19
7	Platense	17	6	7	4	26	29	−3	19
8	Huracán	17	7	4	6	32	22	+10	18
9	Argentinos Juniors	17	7	4	6	26	32	−6	18
10	Ferro Carril Oeste	17	7	3	7	30	36	−6	17
11	Estudiantes (LP)	17	6	4	7	32	32	0	16
12	Chacarita Juniors	17	6	4	7	36	42	−6	16
13	Vélez Sarsfield	17	7	1	9	45	35	+10	15
14	Gimnasia y Esgrima (LP)	17	6	2	9	31	48	−17	14
15	Lanús	17	5	2	10	27	43	−16	12
16	Quilmes	17	4	3	10	24	39	−15	11
17	Tigre	17	2	4	11	21	43	−22	8
18	Talleres (RE)	17	1	5	11	19	43	−24	7

== Copa de Oro ==
1936 Copa de Oro
20 December 1936

River Plate	4–2	San Lorenzo
Cesarini 39'; Chividini 73' (o.g.); Pedernera 76'; Ferreyra 86'	Report	Pantó 55'; Canteli 81'

Estadio de Independiente, Avellaneda
Referee: Bartolomé Macías
