= List of River Plate players =

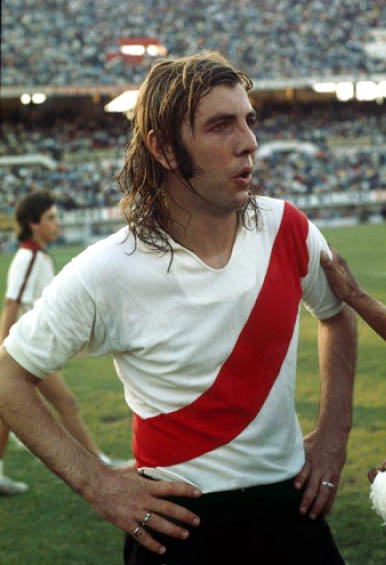
Reinaldo Merlo is River Plate's most-capped player of all time, making 563 appearances in 16 years for the club.

Club Atlético River Plate is an Argentine professional football club based in Buenos Aires, who currently play in the Argentine Primera División. River Plate entered the Primera División in their fifth season, and placed second in the league's 18th edition. Since that time, the club's first team has competed in numerous nationally and internationally organised competitions. Since playing their first competitive match, more than 1300 players have made a competitive first-team appearance for the club, of whom 206 players have made at least 100 appearances.

River Plate's record appearance-maker is Reinaldo Merlo, who made 563 appearances between 1969 and 1984. Amadeo Carrizo has made the second-most appearances with 550, while eight other players have made more than 400 appearances for the club. Ángel Labruna is the club's record goalscorer, with 318 goals in over 20 years at the club. He is also the only player to score more than 300 goals for River Plate; only two other players have scored more than 200 goals for the club.

== Players ==
- Appearances and goals are for first-team competitive matches only.
- Players are listed according to the date of their first team debut for the club.
- Positions are listed according to the tactical formations that were employed at the time. Thus, the change in the names of defensive and midfield reflects the tactical evolution that occurred from the 1960s onwards.
- Players still actively playing at River Plate are marked with †.
- Statistics correct as of 5 November 2026.

Table headers

- Nationality – If a player played international football, the country/countries he played for are shown. Otherwise, the player's nationality is given as their country of birth.
- Club career– The year of the player's first appearance for River Plate to the year of his last appearance.
- Starts – The number of games started.
- Sub – The number of games played as a substitute. Substitutions were only introduced to the Primera División in the year 1959.
- Total – The total number of games played, both as a starter and as a substitute.

Positions key
Pre-1960s		1960s–	
GK	Goalkeeper		
FB	Full back	DF	Defender
HB	Half back	MF	Midfielder
FW	Forward		
U	Utility player		

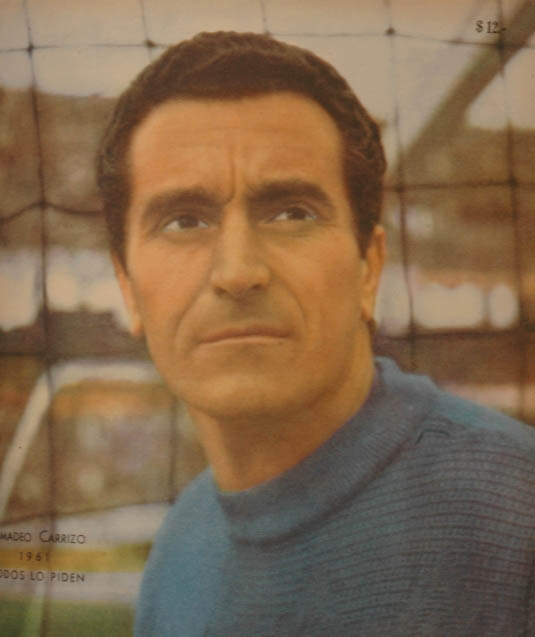
Amadeo Carrizo lies second in the all-time appearance list with 550.

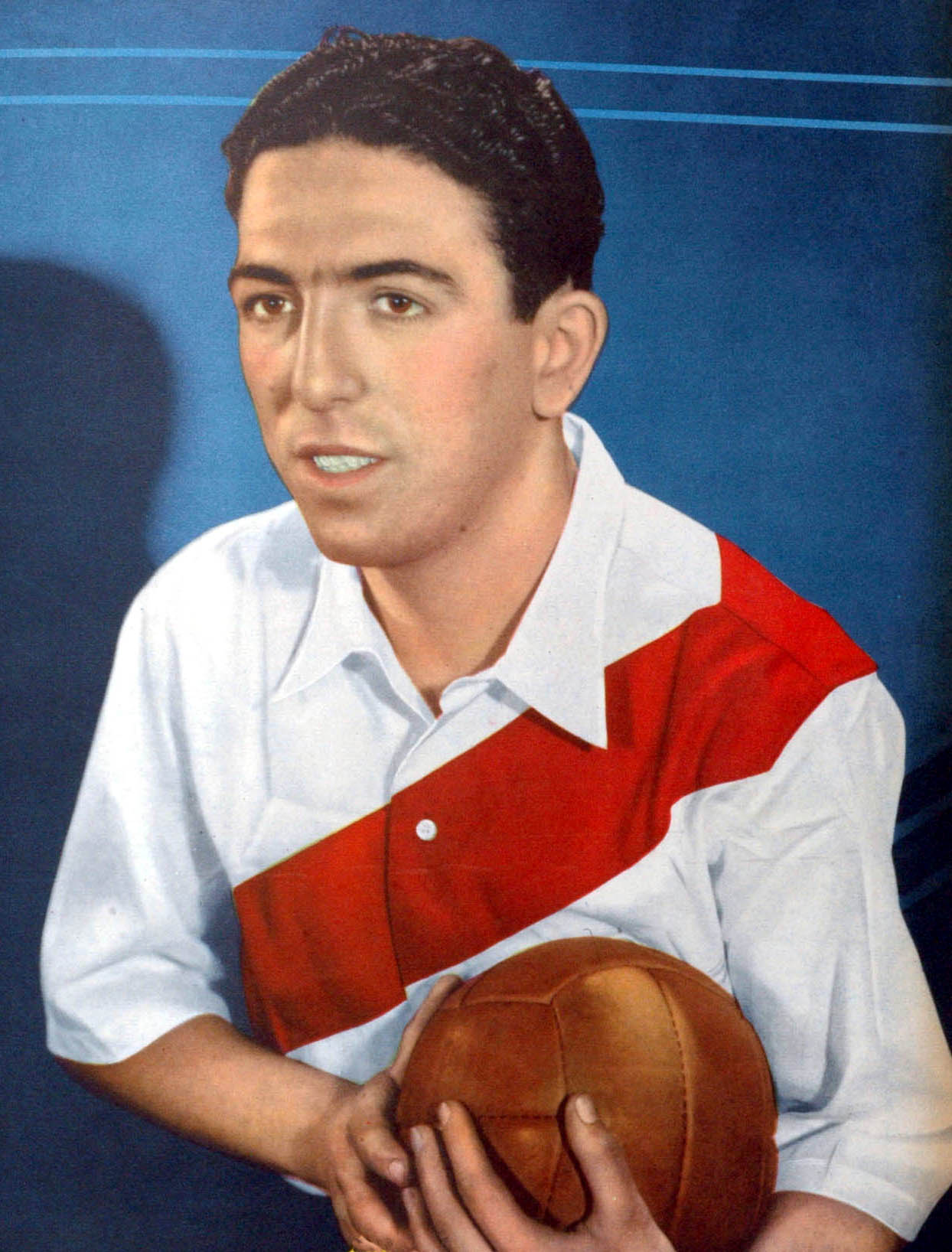
Ángel Labruna, the club's record goalscorer with 318 goals and longest-serving player.

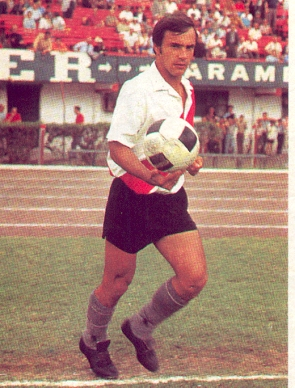
Oscar Más is River Plate's second-highest all-time goalscorer.

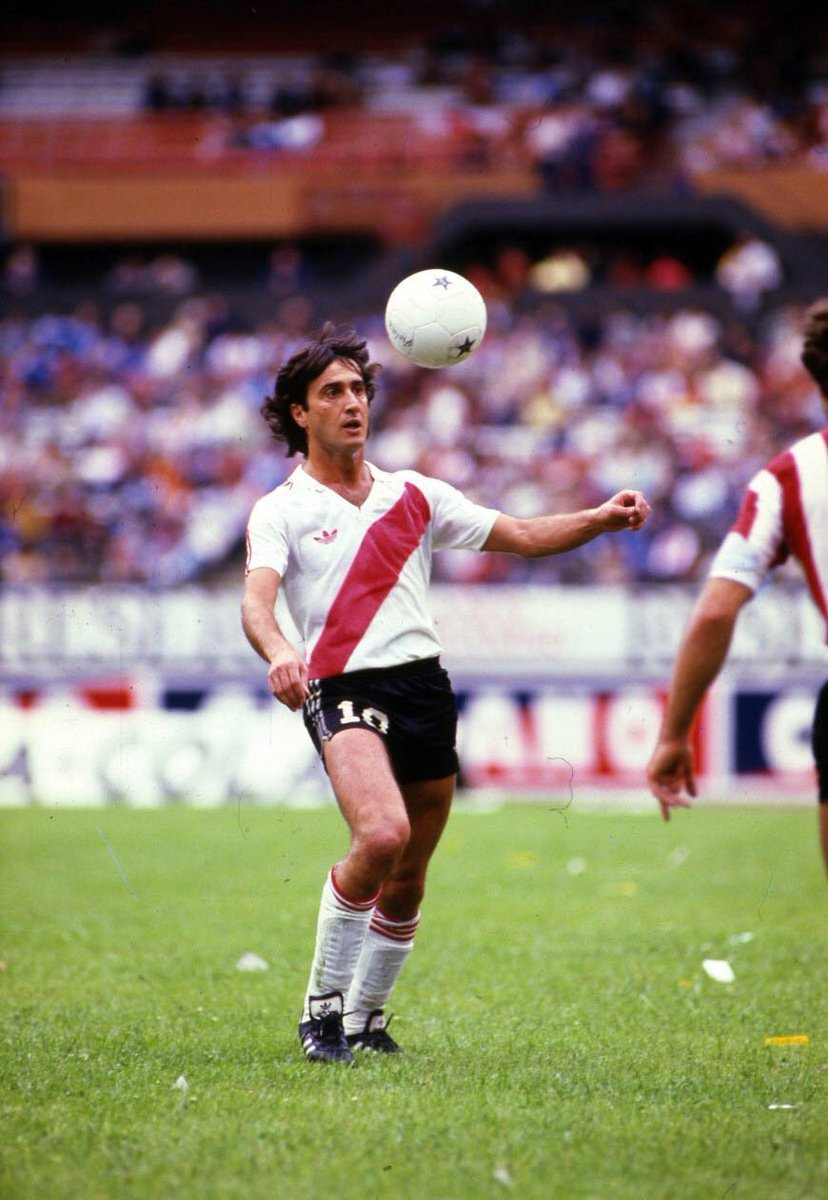
Norberto Alonso has 158 goals, the most for a River Plate midfielder.

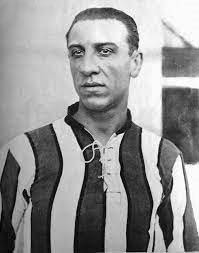
Cándido García scored the first official goal in the history of the Superclásico.

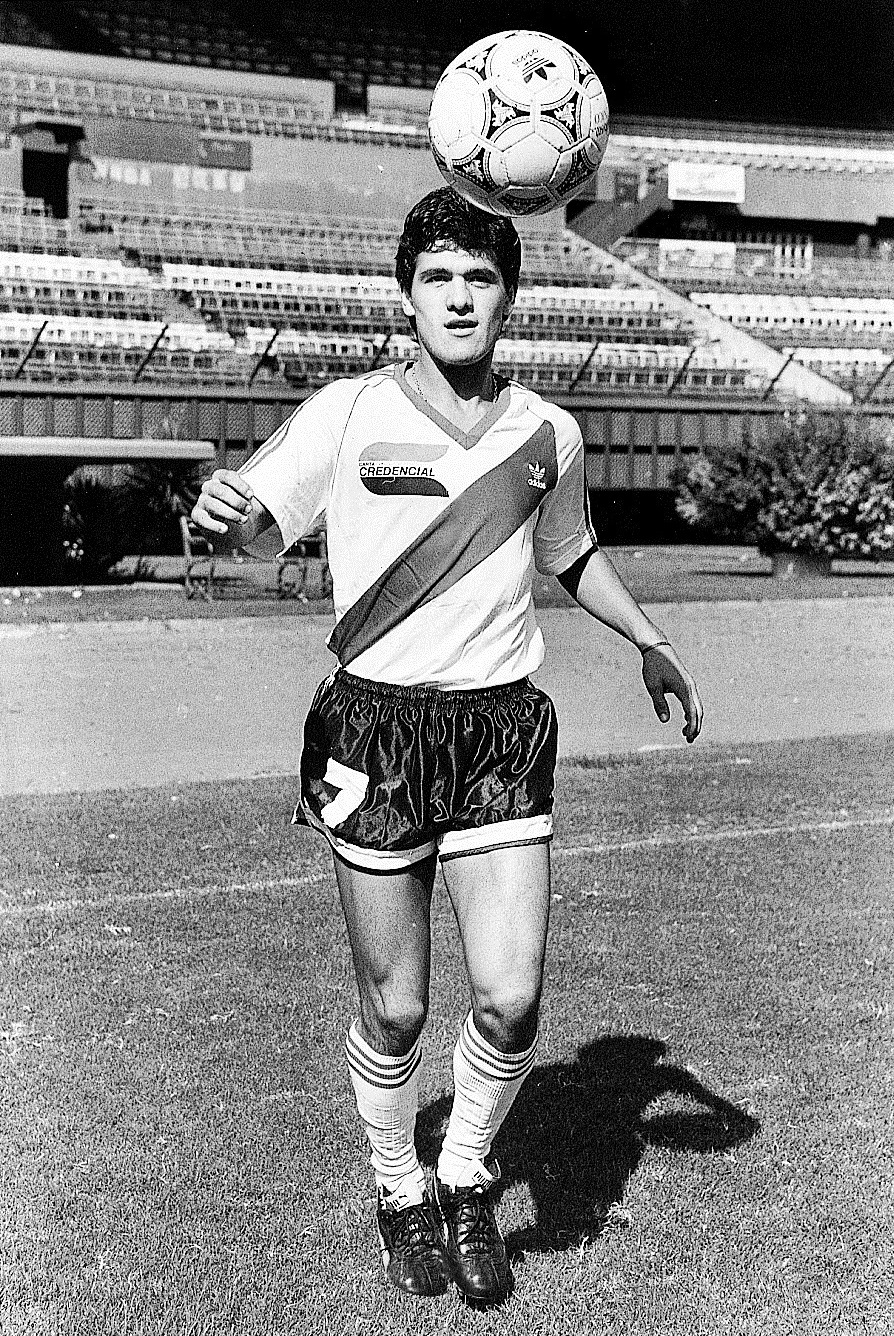
Ariel Ortega registered 80 goals in 361 matches during his three spells at the club.

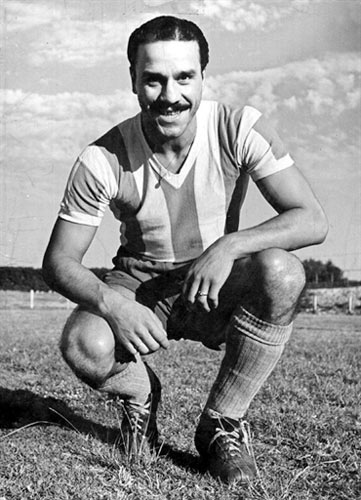
José Manuel Moreno, regarded by the IFFHS as the fifth best South American player of the 20th century.

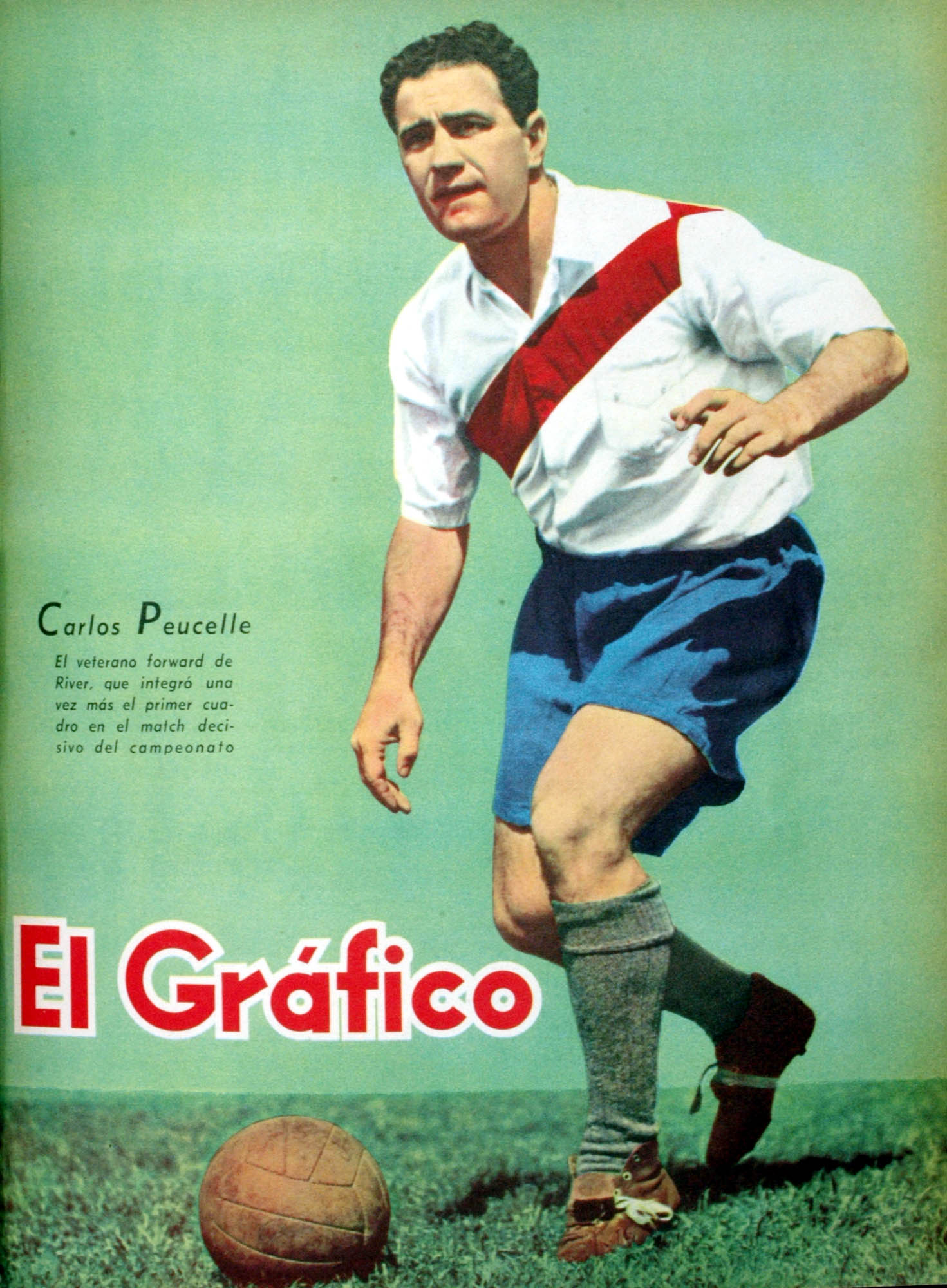
Carlos Peucelle, the first most expensive transfer by the club, which gave way to the River Plate nickname of Millonario.

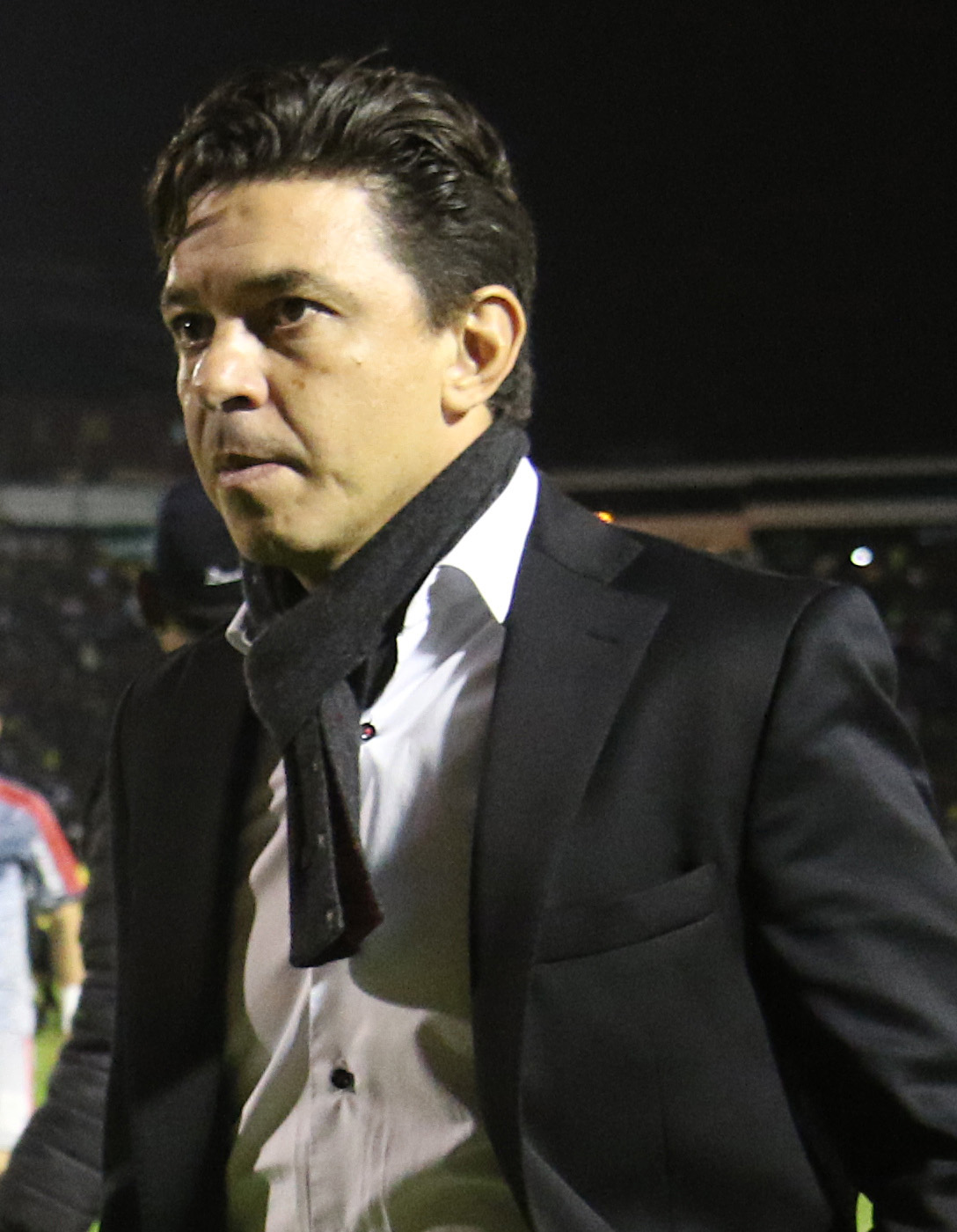
Marcelo Gallardo, who went on to manage River Plate, totalizes 22 titles with the club.

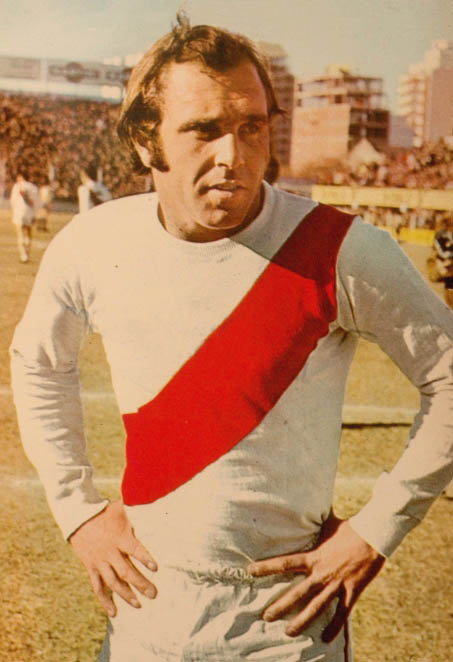
Daniel Onega has the most goals in South America for River Plate, with 37.

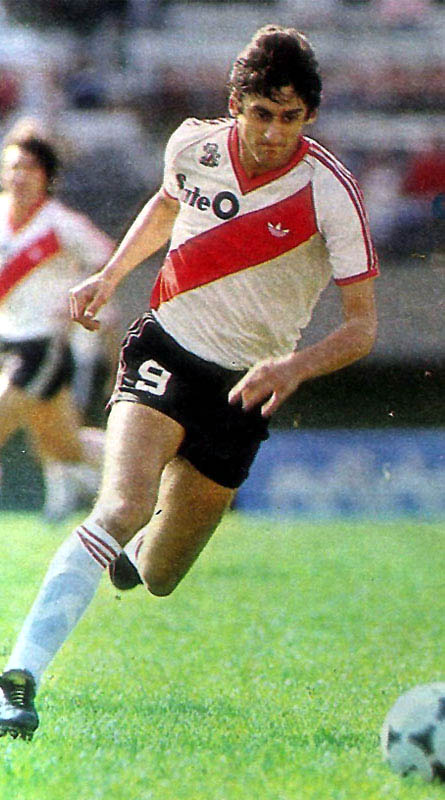
Enzo Francescoli has the most appearances for a foreign player.

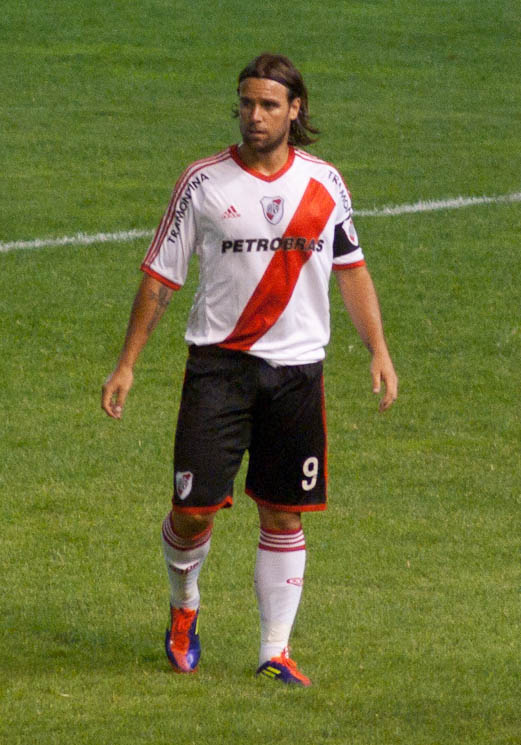
Fernando Cavenaghi scored 15 goals in the 2002 Clausura with only 18 years of age.

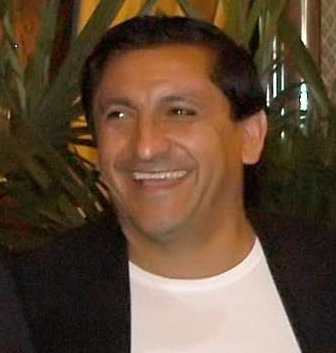
Ramón Díaz won five honours as a player. He later then went on to manage the club, earning another nine.

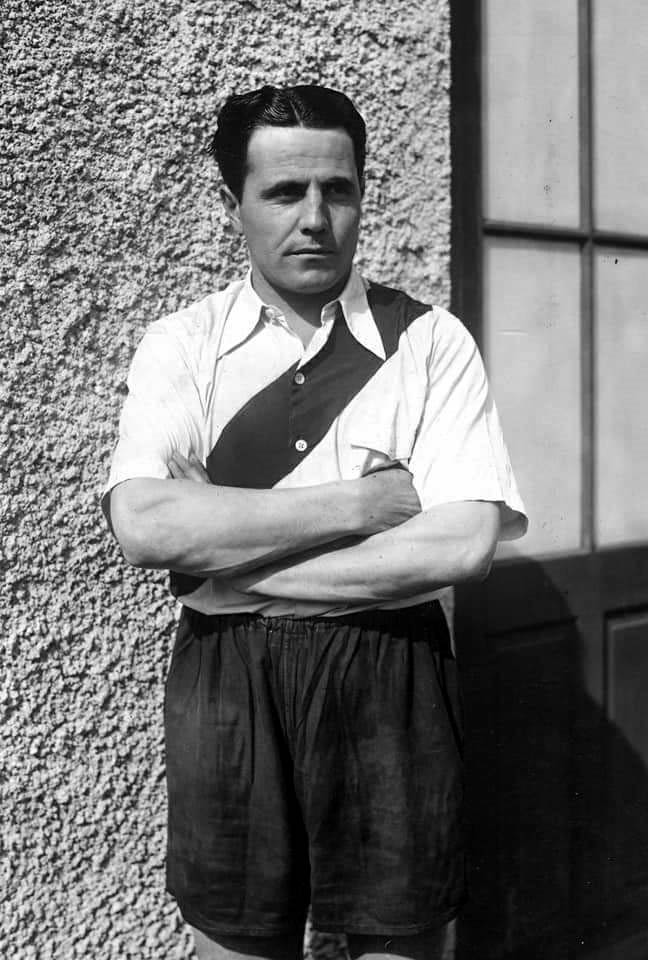
Bernabé Ferreyra is River Plate's third most prolific goalscorer, with 201 goals in just 195 matches.

River Plate players with over 100 appearances
Player	Nationality	Position	Club career	Starts	Subs	Total	Goals	Ref.
Player	Nationality	Position	Club career	Appearances			Goals	Ref.
Arturo Chiappe	Argentina	FB	1908–1920	254	0	254	27	
Antonio Ameal Pereyra	Argentina	FW	1909–1920	171	0	171	40	
Pedro Calneggia	Argentina	FB	1910–1919	151	0	151	3	
Atilio Peruzzi	Argentina	HB	1910–1920	133	0	133	2	
Cándido García	Argentina	HB	1913–1927	365	0	365	42	
Heriberto Simmons	Argentina	HB	1913–1926	222	0	222	8	
Carlos Isola	Argentina	GK	1913–1925	148	0	148	3	
Nicolás Rofrano	Argentina	FW	1915–1925	155	0	155	44	
Roberto Taramasso	Argentina	HB	1916–1927	221	0	221	4	
Jacinto Giúdice	Argentina	FB	1917; 1920–1927	169	0	169	3	
Emilio Medone	Argentina	FW	1917–1925	141	0	141	15	
Pedro Choperena	Argentina	FB	1918–1928	208	0	208	1	
Pascual Licciardi	Argentina	FW	1921–1926	103	0	103	44	
Juan Carlos Iribarren	Argentina	FB	1924–1932	191	0	191	3	
Francisco Gondar	Argentina	FW	1925–1931	150	0	150	17	
Jorge Iribarren	Argentina	GK	1926–1931	146	0	146	0	
Camilo Bonelli	Argentina	HB	1927–1933	133	0	133	3	
José Granara Costa	Argentina	FW	1927–1932	110	0	110	34	
Esteban Malazzo	Argentina	FB	1928–1939	252	0	252	1	
Carlos Peucelle	Argentina	FW	1931–1941	327	0	327	122	
Pedro Lago	Uruguay	FW	1931–1935	131	0	131	35	
Aarón Wergifker	Brazil; Argentina	FB	1932–1941	218	0	218	4	
Alberto Cuello	Argentina	FB	1932–1941	209	0	209	0	
Bernabé Ferreyra	Argentina	FW	1932–1939	195	0	195	201	
Carlos Santamaría	Argentina	U	1932–1936; 1939–1940	151	0	151	1	
Sebastián Sirni	Argentina	GK	1932–1943	116	0	116	0	
Ángel Bosio	Argentina	GK	1932–1936	111	0	111	0	
Bruno Rodolfi	Argentina	HB	1934–1944; 1948	181	0	181	6	
Ricardo Vaghi	Argentina	FB	1935–1949	346	0	346	0	
José Manuel Moreno	Argentina	FW	1935–1944; 1946–1948	341	0	341	183	
Adolfo Pedernera	Argentina	FW	1935–1946	308	0	308	142	
José María Minella	Argentina	HB	1935–1941	161	0	161	5	
Aristóbulo Deambrosi	Argentina	FW	1935–1946	142	0	142	39	
Luis Vasini	Argentina	FB	1935–1940	116	0	116	0	
Ángel Labruna	Argentina	FW	1939–1959	541	0	541	318	
Norberto Yácono	Argentina	FB	1939–1953	417	0	417	0	
Juan Carlos Muñoz	Argentina	FW	1939–1950	198	0	198	42	
José Ramos	Argentina	HB	1940–1952	324	0	324	17	
Luis Antonio Ferreyra	Argentina	FB	1940–1948	116	0	116	0	
Félix Loustau	Argentina	FW	1942–1957	388	0	388	106	
Néstor Rossi	Argentina	HB	1944–1949; 1955–1958	164	0	164	7	
Amadeo Carrizo	Argentina	GK	1945–1968	549	1	550	0	
Eduardo Rodríguez	Argentina	FB	1945–1949	107	0	107	0	
Eliseo Prado	Argentina	FW	1948–1958	150	0	150	61	
Lidoro Soria	Argentina	FB	1949–1954	128	0	128	1	
Walter Gómez	Uruguay	FW	1950–1955	141	0	141	74	
Alfredo Pérez	Argentina	FB	1951–1960	199	0	199	0	
Santiago Vernazza	Argentina	FW	1951–1956	164	0	164	72	
Roberto Zárate	Argentina	FW	1951–1960	141	1	142	63	
Julio Luis Venini	Argentina	U	1951–1955; 1958	141	0	141	1	
Pascasio Sola	Argentina	HB	1951–1958	116	0	116	2	
Oscar Mantegari	Argentina	HB	1953–1960	178	0	178	1	
Norberto Menéndez	Argentina	FW	1954–1960	127	0	127	60	
Federico Vairo	Argentina	FB	1955–1959	101	1	102	3	
Ermindo Onega	Argentina	FW	1957–1968	230	0	230	102	
Juan Carlos Sarnari	Argentina	HB	1959–1967	176	0	176	42	
José Ramos Delgado	Argentina	FB	1959–1965	172	1	173	0	
José Varacka	Argentina	MF	1960–1966	147	0	147	1	
Marcelo Etchegaray	Argentina	DF	1960–1964	118	0	118	0	
Delem	Brazil	MF	1961–1967	105	2	107	37	
Alberto Sainz	Argentina	DF	1962–1967	178	0	178	1	
Oscar Más	Argentina	FW	1964–1973; 1975–1976	420	4	424	220	
Roberto Matosas	Uruguay	U	1964–1968	201	0	201	14	
Luis Cubilla	Uruguay	FW	1964–1968	158	0	158	35	
Jorge Solari	Argentina	MF	1964–1969	102	1	103	15	
Daniel Onega	Argentina	FW	1966–1973	246	6	252	119	
Juan Carlos Guzmán	Argentina	DF	1966–1970	158	0	158	0	
Abel Vieitez	Argentina	DF	1966–1970	125	1	126	3	
Jorge Dominichi	Argentina	DF	1967–1973	149	4	153	7	
César Laraignée	Argentina	DF	1968–1972	114	1	115	14	
Jorge Recio	Argentina	DF	1968–1970	99	2	101	9	
Reinaldo Merlo	Argentina	MF	1969–1984	524	39	563	11	
Víctor Marchetti	Argentina	U	1969–1974; 1977–1978	153	34	187	56	
José Alberto Pérez	Argentina	GK	1969–1974	168	5	173	0	
Juan José López	Argentina	MF	1970–1981	459	7	466	83	
Carlos Morete	Argentina	FW	1970–1975	183	17	200	105	
Norberto Alonso	Argentina	MF	1971–1976; 1977–1981; 1984–1986	394	27	421	158	
Ubaldo Fillol	Argentina	GK	1973–1983	404	1	405	0	
Hugo Pena	Argentina	DF	1973–1976	92	11	103	0	
Daniel Passarella	Argentina	DF	1974–1981; 1988–1989	317	14	331	103	
Héctor López	Argentina	DF	1974–1981	309	9	318	1	
Alejandro Sabella	Argentina	MF	1974–1978	81	51	132	13	
Pedro González	Argentina	FW	1975–1981	293	12	305	52	
Leopoldo Luque	Argentina	FW	1975–1980	201	6	207	85	
Pablo Comelles	Argentina	DF	1975–1981	177	8	185	3	
Roberto Perfumo	Argentina	DF	1975–1978	135	0	135	3	
Héctor Ártico	Argentina	DF	1975–1977	76	34	110	5	
Eduardo Saporiti	Argentina	DF	1976–1986	343	6	349	8	
Emilio Commisso	Argentina	MF	1976–1983	215	28	243	29	
Daniel Lonardi	Argentina	DF	1976–1981	129	45	174	4	
Oscar Ortiz	Argentina	FW	1977–1981	113	8	121	11	
Ramón Díaz	Argentina	FW	1978–1981; 1991–1993	153	52	205	95	
José Luis Pavoni	Argentina	DF	1978–1981	143	0	143	0	
Alberto Tarantini	Argentina	DF	1980–1983	127	0	127	5	
Carlos Tapia	Argentina	MF	1980–1984	80	30	110	15	
Jorge Gordillo	Argentina	DF	1981–1992	240	21	261	4	
Américo Gallego	Argentina	MF	1981–1988	196	7	203	11	
Jorge García	Argentina	DF	1981–1984	123	7	130	11	
Julio Olarticoechea	Argentina	DF	1981–1984	104	12	116	5	
Antonio Alzamendi	Uruguay	FW	1982–1983; 1986–1988	106	1	107	43	
Enzo Francescoli	Uruguay	FW	1983–1986; 1994–1997	234	3	237	137	
Héctor Enrique	Argentina	MF	1983–1990	129	28	157	9	
Néstor Gorosito	Argentina	MF	1983–1988	64	58	122	9	
Alejandro Montenegro	Argentina	DF	1983–1988	100	0	100	4	
Nery Pumpido	Argentina	GK	1984–1988	144	0	144	0	
Jorge Borelli	Argentina	DF	1984–1989	123	6	129	3	
Roque Alfaro	Argentina	FW	1984–1987	107	5	112	13	
Oscar Ruggeri	Argentina	DF	1985–1988	120	0	120	5	
Gustavo Zapata	Argentina	MF	1986–1993	133	27	160	3	
Ernesto Corti	Argentina	DF	1987–1990; 1993–1996	215	20	235	10	
Ángel Comizzo	Argentina	GK	1988–1992; 2001–2003	206	2	208	0	
Fabián Basualdo	Argentina	DF	1988–1993	182	1	183	1	
Jorge Higuaín	Argentina	DF	1988–1992	151	0	151	9	
Juan José Borrelli	Argentina	MF	1988–1991; 1997	89	33	122	18	
Carlos Enrique	Argentina	DF	1988–1992	119	3	122	2	
Leonardo Astrada	Argentina	MF	1989–2003	431	32	463	8	
Hernán Díaz	Argentina	DF	1989–2001	367	55	422	21	
Ramón Medina Bello	Argentina	FW	1989–1994; 1996–1997	178	36	214	70	
Walter Silvani	Argentina	FW	1989–1995	105	66	171	34	
Rubén Da Silva	Uruguay	FW	1989–1993	107	7	114	39	
Sergio Berti	Argentina	MF	1990–1992; 1993–1995; 1996–1999	225	15	240	51	
Ariel Ortega	Argentina	FW	1991–1996; 2000–2002; 2006–2010	310	51	361	80	
Guillermo Rivarola	Argentina	DF	1991–1996	164	18	182	11	
Julio Toresani	Argentina	MF	1991–1995	103	12	115	12	
Pablo Lavallén	Argentina	DF	1991–1996	75	26	101	5	
Matías Almeyda	Argentina	MF	1992–1996; 2009–2011	143	19	162	5	
Ricardo Altamirano	Argentina	DF	1992–1997	149	11	160	4	
Marcelo Gallardo	Argentina	MF	1993–1999; 2003–2006; 2009–2010	243	62	305	70	
Germán Burgos	Argentina	GK	1994–1999	148	3	151	0	
Gustavo Lombardi	Argentina	DF	1994–2001	118	8	126	0	
Gabriel Cedrés	Uruguay	MF	1994–1996	84	17	101	13	
Celso Ayala	Paraguay	DF	1995–1998; 2001–2005	221	1	222	13	
Eduardo Berizzo	Argentina	DF	1996–2000	175	3	178	8	
Roberto Bonano	Argentina	GK	1996–2001	170	4	174	1	
Marcelo Escudero	Argentina	MF	1996–2002	105	61	166	17	
Leonel Gancedo	Argentina	MF	1996–2000	79	71	150	8	
Juan Pablo Sorín	Argentina	U	1996–1999	127	4	131	16	
Marcelo Salas	Chile	FW	1996–1998; 2003–2005	87	29	116	46	
Pablo Aimar	Argentina	MF	1996–2000; 2015	96	19	115	29	
Santiago Solari	Argentina	MF	1996–1998	52	48	100	17	
Diego Placente	Argentina	DF	1997–2000	120	34	154	5	
Martín Cardetti	Argentina	FW	1997–2001	86	49	135	68	
Pedro Sarabia	Paraguay	DF	1997–2002	102	28	130	1	
Guillermo Pereyra	Argentina	MF	1998–2004	88	53	141	10	
Javier Saviola	Argentina	FW	1998–2001; 2015	125	11	136	58	
Juan Pablo Ángel	Colombia	FW	1998–2000	108	24	132	62	
Víctor Zapata	Argentina	MF	1999–2007	194	59	253	19	
Eduardo Coudet	Argentina	MF	1999–2004	154	25	179	27	
Cristian Ledesma	Argentina	MF	1999–2005; 2011–2014	123	30	153	1	
Ariel Garcé	Argentina	DF	1999–2004	119	11	130	1	
Nelson Cuevas	Paraguay	FW	1999–2004	37	66	103	14	
Mario Yepes	Colombia	DF	1999–2001	98	3	101	9	
Andrés D'Alessandro	Argentina	MF	2000–2003; 2016	105	23	128	28	
Fernando Cavenaghi	Argentina	FW	2001–2004; 2011–2012; 2014–2015	174	38	212	111	
Franco Costanzo	Argentina	GK	2001–2005	120	0	120	0	
Ricardo Rojas	Argentina; Paraguay	DF	2001–2006	97	7	104	1	
Oscar Ahumada	Argentina	MF	2002–2010	134	34	168	1	
Luis González	Argentina	MF	2002–2005; 2015–2016	114	37	151	25	
Germán Lux	Argentina	GK	2002–2006; 2017–2021	104	3	107	0	
Eduardo Tuzzio	Argentina	DF	2003–2008	158	4	162	6	
Matías Abelairas	Argentina	MF	2004–2010	88	21	109	12	
Danilo Gerlo	Argentina	DF	2004–2009	82	19	101	3	
Radamel Falcao	Colombia	FW	2005–2009	93	18	111	45	
Paulo Ferrari	Argentina	DF	2006–2011	216	7	223	15	
Juan Pablo Carrizo	Argentina	GK	2006–2008; 2010–2011	125	0	125	0	
Diego Buonanotte	Argentina	MF	2006–2011	87	35	122	26	
Leonardo Ponzio	Argentina	MF	2007–2008; 2012–2021	302	56	358	10	
Cristian Villagra	Argentina	DF	2007–2010	106	2	108	3	
Rogelio Funes Mori	Argentina; Mexico	DF	2009–2013	62	40	102	22	
Jonatan Maidana	Argentina	DF	2010–2018; 2021–2023	301	18	319	8	
Manuel Lanzini	Argentina	MF	2010–2014; 2023–2025	97	53	150	15	
Ramiro Funes Mori	Argentina	DF	2010–2015; 2023–2024	113	17	130	10	
Leandro González Pírez	Argentina	DF	2011–2013; 2022–2025	125	18	143	7	
Carlos Sánchez	Uruguay	MF	2011–2015	129	8	137	28	
Germán Pezzella	Argentina	DF	2011–2015; 2024–2026	97	22	119	6	
Rodrigo Mora	Uruguay	FW	2012–2018	122	62	184	41	
Marcelo Barovero	Argentina	GK	2012–2016	167	0	167	0	
Ariel Rojas	Argentina	MF	2012–2015; 2017–2018	127	25	152	3	
Matías Kranevitter	Argentina	MF	2012–2015; 2023–2025	96	52	148	0	
Gabriel Mercado	Argentina	DF	2012–2016	142	2	144	11	
Sebastián Driussi †	Argentina	FW	2013–2017; 2025–	129	40	169	46	
Leonel Vangioni	Argentina	DF	2013–2016	126	3	129	5	
Milton Casco	Argentina	DF	2015–2025	289	27	316	5	
Gonzalo Martínez	Argentina	U	2015–2018; 2023–2025	126	68	194	38	
Lucas Martínez Quarta †	Argentina	DF	2015–2020; 2025–	183	1	184	11	
Camilo Mayada	Uruguay	U	2015–2019	79	55	134	7	
Ignacio Fernández	Argentina	MF	2016–2021; 2023–2025	258	57	315	42	
Gonzalo Montiel †	Argentina	DF	2016–2021; 2025–	201	9	210	18	
Enzo Pérez	Argentina	MF	2017–2023; 2025	257	22	279	6	
Nicolás de la Cruz	Uruguay	MF	2017–2023	171	43	214	36	
Rafael Santos Borré †	Colombia	FW	2017–2021; 2026–	111	52	163	57	
Javier Pinola	Argentina	DF	2017–2022	141	5	146	8	
Franco Armani	Argentina	GK	2018–2026	366	0	366	0	
Juan Fernando Quintero	Colombia	MF	2018–2020; 2022; 2025–2026	63	74	137	24	
Julián Alvarez	Argentina	FW	2018–2022	87	35	122	54	
Bruno Zuculini	Argentina	MF	2018–2023	80	42	122	9	
Lucas Pratto	Argentina	FW	2018–2020	74	35	109	26	
Paulo Díaz	Chile	DF	2019–2026	203	19	222	13	
Matías Suárez	Argentina	FW	2019–2023	74	59	133	40	
Santiago Simón	Argentina	MF	2020–2025	97	49	146	6	
Agustín Palavecino	Argentina	MF	2021–2024	70	66	136	13	
Miguel Borja	Colombia	FW	2022–2025	84	75	159	62	
Esequiel Barco	Argentina	MF	2022–2024	87	40	127	16	
Pablo Solari	Argentina	FW	2022–2025	66	44	110	30	
Rodrigo Aliendro	Argentina	MF	2022–2025	80	29	109	5	
Facundo Colidio	Argentina	FW	2023–2026	96	40	136	32	
