= 1913 Superclásico =

Football match in Buenos Aires, Argentina

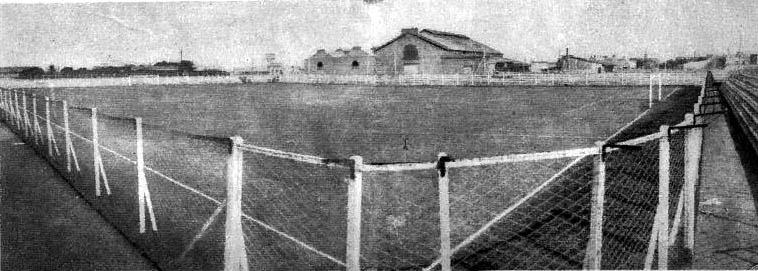
- Racing Club Stadium, the venue of the match (pictured in 1916).
- Event: 1913 Argentine Primera División
River Plate	Boca Juniors
2	1
- Date: 24 August 1913
- Venue: Estadio Racing Club, Avellaneda
- Referee: Paddy McCarthy
- Attendance: 7,000

The 1913 Superclásico was an association football match between River Plate and Boca Juniors on 24 August 1913 at the Estadio Racing Club in Avellaneda, Buenos Aires, Argentina. The first official match in the history of the rivalry and the third match disputed in its history.

== Background ==
This was the first season that Boca Juniors played in the first division, while River had been in it since 1909. In the 1913 season, the league was divided into two groups where the winner of each of the two groups would play a final which could decide the winner of the league. River Plate were second in their group, while Boca Juniors were third.

The two teams had played two friendlies before, one in 1908 where Boca Juniors won 2–1 and a charity match organised in 1912 to raise funds for an injured worker where Boca Juniors abandoned the match in protest of the referring. The match had to be played at Racing Club's stadium as River Plate stadium had been severely damaged by a cyclone.

== Match ==
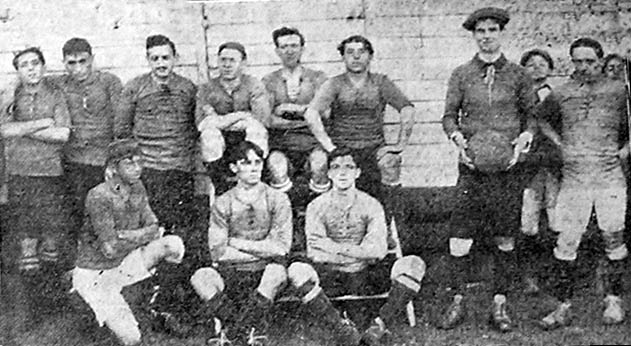
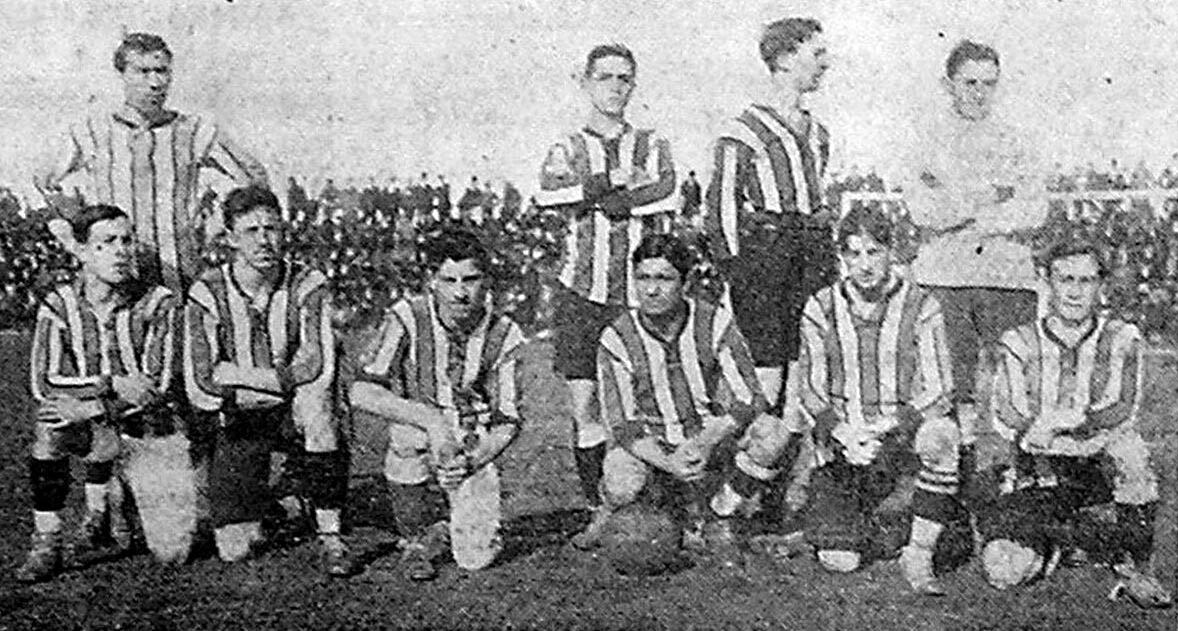
Starting line-ups of Boca Juniors (left) and River Plate (right) for the match

The match was played at the Estadio Racing Club on 24 August 1913 with an attendance of 7,000. It was supposed to start at 14:30, but there was a 40-minute delay as the referee of the match never showed up and had to be replaced by Irishman Patrick McCarthy, who served as sports educator, boxer, and football referee in Argentina.

La Nación in their match report from 1913 wrote that Boca Juniors was focused on the attack, while River Plate's defence was described as "solid". River Plate scored the first goal, which was a header by centre-half Cándido García in the 23rd minute. Two minutes later, Boca Juniors player Juan Garibaldi got injured, which forced Boca Juniors to play with 10 men for the rest of the match, because substitutions were not allowed by then (they were officially added to the Laws of the Game in 1958).

In the 47th minute, River Plate made 2 nil with a goal by Antonio Ameal Pereyra, a player who would play for Boca Juniors 9 years later.

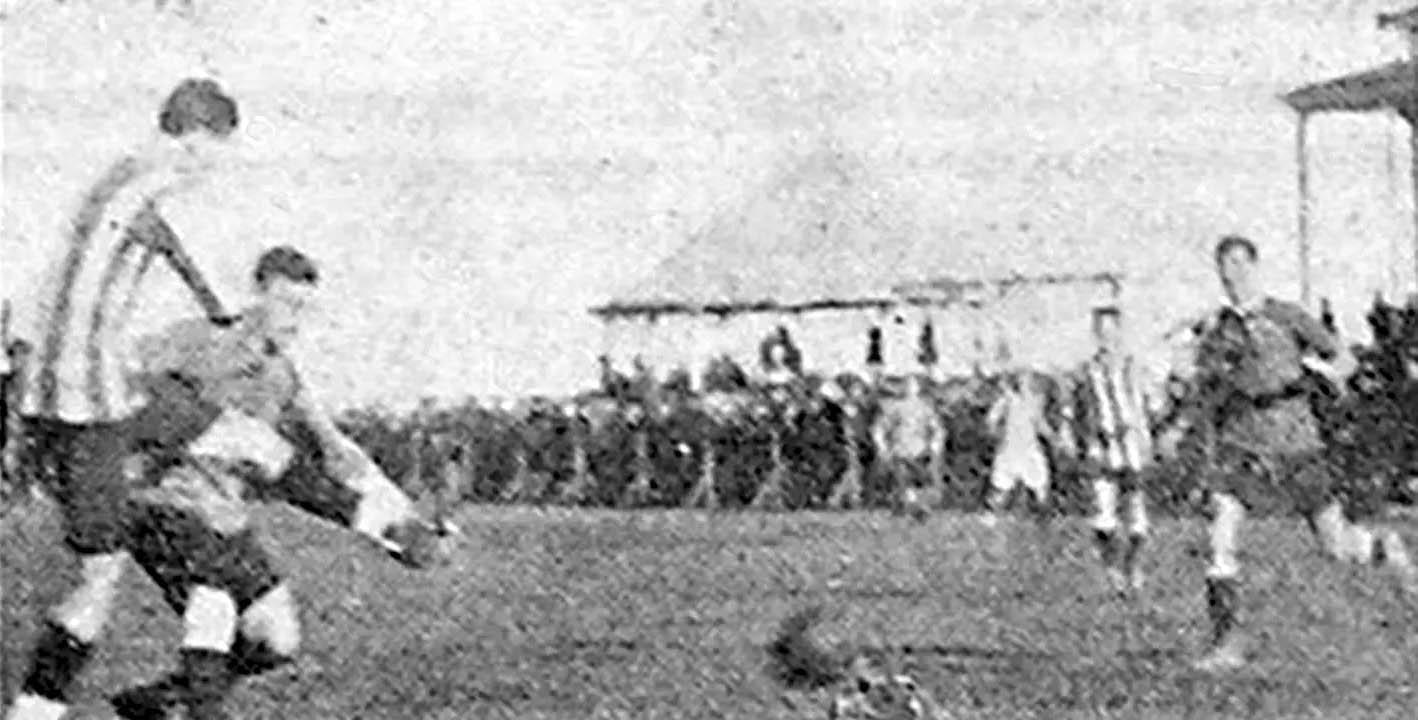
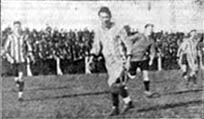
The only two known pictures of the match

Boca Juniors scored his only goal in the 70th minute by Marcos Mayer. In the 75th minute, River Plate started an attacking play, in which Boca Juniors goalkeeper Juan Virtú Bidone successfully intercepted the ball. However, after that, a discussion started in the goal that escalated into a fight between the Boca Juniors players and the River Plate players, which also spread to the spectators with some fans starting a fight in the stands.

This fight got Antonio Ameal Pereyra expelled and the two teams ended the match with ten men.

=== Details ===
1913 Argentine Primera División
24 August 1913
15:10 UTC-3
Round 11th.

River Plate	2–1	Boca Juniors
García 23'; Ameal Pereyra 47'	Report	Mayer 70'

Estadio Racing Club, Avellaneda
Attendance: 7,000
Referee: Patrick McCarthy (Ireland)

River Plate	Boca Juniors

(Argentina) Carlos Ísola
(Argentina) Arturo Chiappe
(Argentina) Pedro Calneggia
(Argentina) Heriberto Simmons
(Argentina) Cándido García
(Argentina) Atillo Peruzzi
(Argentina) Luis Galeano
(Argentina) Antonio Ameal Pereyra	(red card) 75'
(England) Arthur Herbert Thompson
(Argentina) Fernando Roldán
(Argentina) Roberto Fraga

(Argentina) Juan Virtú Bidone
(Argentina) Juan Garibaldi	Substituted off
(Argentina) Horacio Lamelas
(Argentina) Miguel Valentini
(Argentina) Marcelino Vergara
(Argentina) Miguel Elena
(Argentina) Pedro Calomino
(Uruguay) Angel Romano
(Argentina) Marcos Mayer
(Argentina) Donato Abattangalo
(Argentina) Francisco Taggino

Notes

Injured player; substitutions were not allowed in those times so both teams ended with 10 players each
