= List of Club Atlético River Plate managers =

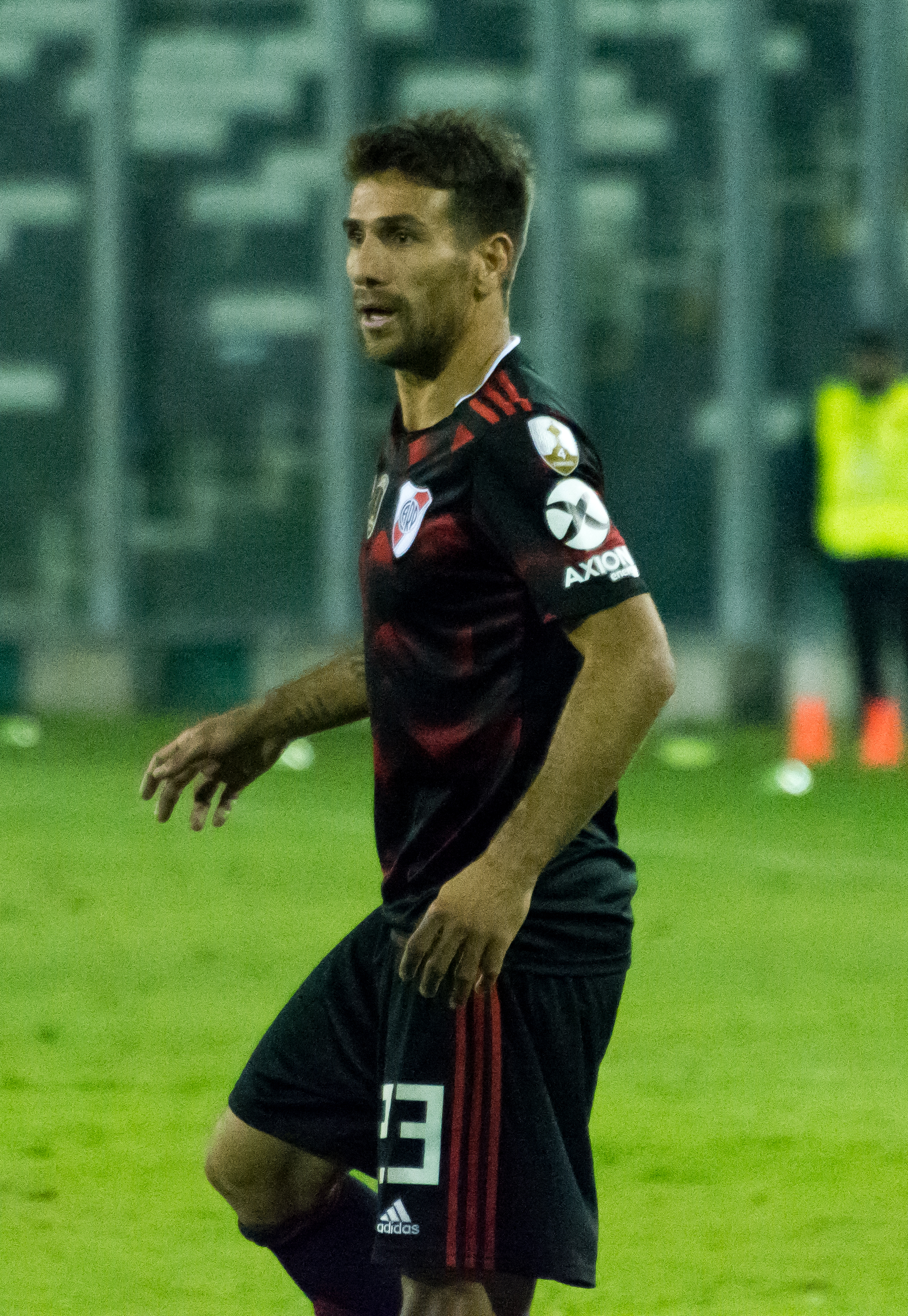
Leonardo Ponzio is River Plate's current head coach, serving since August 2026.

Club Atlético River Plate is an Argentine professional football club based in Buenos Aires, who currently play in the Argentine Primera División. The club was formed in 1901, as a result of the merging of football clubs Santa Rosa and La Rosales. River Plate won their first Primera División title in 1920; since then, the club has won a further 37 league titles, along with 16 national cups. At international level, they have been crowned champions of South American football on four occasions, winning the Copa Libertadores in 1986, 1996, 2015 and 2018, and have also won a Worldwide thropy, the 1986 Intercontinental Cup.

River Plate have had 59 managers, of whom the most successful person to manage the club is Marcelo Gallardo. Domestically, he won one Primera División title, three Copa Argentina, two Supercopa Argentina and one Trofeo de Campeones de la Liga Profesional. Internationally, he led River Plate to two Copa Libertadores, one Copa Sudamericana, three Recopa Sudamericana and a Suruga Bank Championship title in his joint ten-year reign as manager. The club's longest-serving manager was José María Minella, who managed the club from 1947 to 1959, totalling 13 years. Several coaches have managed River Plate twice, with Renato Cesarini having the longest gap between spells. He first took charge of the club during 1939, and then from 1965 to 1966 on his third spell.

This chronological list comprises all those who have held the position of manager of the first team of River Plate since 1931. Each manager's entry includes his dates of tenure and the club's overall competitive record (in terms of matches won, drawn and lost), honours won and significant achievements while under his care. Caretaker managers are included, where known, as well as those who have been in permanent charge.

== Key ==
Key to record:

- Pld = Matches played
- W = Matches won
- D = Matches drawn
- L = Matches lost
- GF = Goals for / scored
- GA = Goals against / conceded
- Win % = Win ratio

== Managers ==
Information correct as of 5 November 2026. Only competitive matches are counted.

Key
*	Caretaker manager

River Plate managers
Name	Nat.	From	To	Record							Honours	Ref.
Name	Nat.	From	To	Pld	W	D	L	GF	GA	Win%	Honours	Ref.
Víctor Caamaño	ARG	1 March 1931	6 January 1933	85	49	17	19	172	102	57.65	1 Primera División; 1 Copa de Competencia	
Felipe Pascucci	ITA	12 March 1933	13 January 1934	41	22	6	13	79	47	53.66	—	
Víctor Caamaño	ARG	18 March 1934	24 June 1934	13	8	2	3	36	17	61.54	—	
Carlos Isola	ARG	1 July 1934	16 September 1934	12	5	2	5	20	10	41.67	—	
Jenő Medgyessy*	HUN	23 September 1934		1	1	0	0	1	0	100.00	—	
Arnoldo Watson Hutton	ARG	30 September 1934	23 December 1934	13	9	0	4	34	17	69.23	—	
Imre Hirschl	HUN	17 March 1935	18 December 1938	138	95	20	23	385	188	68.84	3 Primera División; 1 Copa Ibarguren; 2 Copa Aldao	
Renato Cesarini	ITA	11 February 1939	8 December 1939	37	24	5	8	105	47	64.86	—	
Franz Platko	HUN	7 April 1940	30 June 1940	12	3	2	7	21	32	25.00	—	
Renato Cesarini	ITA	7 July 1940	22 October 1944	150	90	36	24	377	186	60.00	2 Primera División; 2 Copa Ibarguren; 1 Copa Aldao; 1 Copa Adrián Escobar	
Carlos Peucelle	ARG	29 October 1944	8 December 1946	73	46	15	12	164	90	63.01	1 Primera División; 1 Copa Aldao	
José María Minella	ARG	29 March 1947	20 November 1959	423	226	106	91	893	580	53.43	6 Primera División; 1 Copa Aldao; 1 Copa Ibarguren	
Alejandro Galán	ARG	3 April 1960	31 July 1960	12	3	4	5	13	16	25.00	—	
José Ramos	ARG	7 August 1960	16 April 1961	18	13	3	2	33	13	72.22	—	
Imre Hirschl	HUN	23 April 1961	20 August 1961	14	7	5	2	23	10	50.00	—	
José Ramos	ARG	3 September 1961	15 October 1961	8	3	2	3	15	10	37.50	—	
Néstor Rossi	ARG	22 October 1961	28 October 1962	29	18	6	5	62	30	62.07	—	
Florencio García*	ARG	1 November 1962	11 November 1962	3	2	0	1	7	4	66.67	—	
Enrique Kistenmacher*	ARG	25 November 1962	16 December 1962	4	3	0	1	8	3	75.00	—	
José María Minella	ARG	28 April 1963	15 September 1963	17	9	6	2	35	14	52.94	—	
Ángel Labruna	ARG	22 September 1963	24 November 1963	9	4	3	2	13	9	44.44	—	
Carlos Peucelle*	ARG	26 April 1964		1	1	0	0	1	0	100.00	—	
José Manuel Moreno	ARG	3 May 1964	13 September 1964	16	8	4	4	24	16	50.00	—	
Carlos Peucelle*	ARG	20 September 1964	11 October 1964	4	1	3	0	4	3	25.00	—	
José Curti	ARG	18 October 1964	6 December 1964	9	3	4	2	13	11	33.33	—	
Renato Cesarini	ITA	18 April 1965	1 December 1966	92	57	20	15	164	75	61.96	—	
Juan Carlos Lorenzo	ARG	5 March 1967	5 June 1967	25	10	9	6	49	26	40.00	—	
José Zorzenón*	ARG	11 June 1967		1	0	0	1	1	2	0.00	—	
José D'Amico	ARG	13 June 1967	17 December 1967	26	14	3	9	47	26	53.85	—	
Ángel Labruna	ARG	3 March 1968	24 July 1970	115	63	34	18	211	112	54.78	—	
Didi	BRA	6 September 1970	9 April 1972	79	37	21	21	130	104	46.84	—	
Osvaldo Diez	ARG	12 April 1972	22 September 1972	24	11	9	4	49	32	45.83	—	
Bruno Rodolfi*	ARG	30 September 1972		1	0	0	1	1	2	0.00	—	
Juan Urriolabeitia	ARG	15 October 1972	27 March 1973	25	16	3	6	75	43	64.00	—	
Delem	BRA	4 April 1973	29 December 1973	46	23	10	13	84	73	50.00	—	
Néstor Rossi	ARG	3 February 1974	19 May 1974	18	9	2	7	37	28	50.00	—	
Omar Sívori	ARG	21 July 1974	10 November 1974	16	6	5	5	29	17	37.50	—	
Federico Vairo*	ARG	18 November 1974	24 November 1974	2	1	0	1	4	3	50.00	—	
Ángel Labruna	ARG	16 February 1975	15 August 1981	404	215	107	82	728	423	53.22	6 Primera División	
Alfredo Di Stéfano	ARG	15 September 1981	16 May 1982	36	14	14	8	51	41	38.89	1 Primera División	
Vladislao Cap	ARG	18 July 1982	29 August 1982	10	5	1	4	9	9	50.00	—	
José Manuel Vázquez	ARG	3 September 1982	8 December 1982	26	9	5	12	37	39	34.62	—	
José Ramos Delgado*	ARG	12 December 1982	4 February 1983	10	3	5	2	12	12	30.00	—	
José Varacka	ARG	13 March 1983	23 October 1983	33	12	10	11	33	28	36.36	—	
Martín Pando*	ARG	13 July 1983	3 August 1983	7	2	1	4	4	12	28.57	—	
Jorge Dominichi*	ARG	2 November 1983	22 December 1983	12	2	4	6	12	18	16.67	—	
Luis Cubilla	URU	20 February 1984	5 August 1984	32	15	10	7	50	30	46.88	—	
Federico Vairo*	ARG	16 September 1984	20 September 1984	2	1	1	0	3	2	50.00	—	
Martín Pando*	ARG	8 August 1984		1	1	0	0	4	1	100.00	—	
Héctor Veira	ARG	30 September 1984	2 May 1987	117	62	32	23	204	113	52.99	1 Primera División; 1 Copa Libertadores; 1 Intercontinental Cup	
Carlos Griguol	ARG	25 July 1987	20 June 1988	54	22	18	14	69	53	40.74	1 Copa Interamericana	
César Luis Menotti	ARG	11 September 1988	11 June 1989	41	18	13	10	67	39	43.90	—	
Martín Pando*	ARG	14 June 1989		1	0	1	0	1	1	0.00	—	
Reinaldo Merlo	ARG	2 July 1989	10 December 1989	30	17	8	5	32	12	56.67	—	
Daniel Passarella	ARG	26 January 1990	21 August 1994	224	111	66	47	328	195	49.55	3 Primera División	
Américo Gallego	ARG	27 August 1994	18 December 1994	24	13	11	0	35	17	54.17	1 Primera División	
Carlos Babington	ARG	19 February 1995	25 June 1995	27	11	7	9	44	36	40.74	—	
Ramón Díaz	ARG	26 July 1995	19 December 1999	250	126	66	58	452	298	50.40	4 Primera División; 1 Copa Libertadores; 1 Supercopa Libertadores	
Delem*	BRA	13 February 2000		1	1	0	0	2	1	100.00	—	
Américo Gallego	ARG	18 February 2000	5 June 2001	85	50	21	14	183	103	58.82	1 Primera División	
Patricio Hernández*	ARG	10 June 2001		1	0	0	1	1	2	0.00	—	
Ramón Díaz	ARG	22 July 2001	19 May 2002	52	29	14	9	111	49	55.77	1 Primera División	
Manuel Pellegrini	CHI	28 July 2002	19 December 2003	75	40	14	21	129	87	53.33	1 Primera División	
Leonardo Astrada	ARG	11 February 2004	28 August 2005	89	47	19	23	152	106	52.81	1 Primera División	
Reinaldo Merlo	ARG	7 September 2005	11 December 2005	17	6	5	6	27	17	35.29	—	
Daniel Passarella	ARG	26 January 2006	14 November 2007	99	45	31	23	169	115	45.45	—	
Jorge Gordillo*	ARG	24 November 2007	8 December 2007	3	0	0	3	0	8	0.00	—	
Diego Simeone	ARG	10 February 2008	9 November 2008	45	20	13	12	68	52	44.44	1 Primera División	
Gabriel Rodríguez*	ARG	16 November 2008	13 December 2008	5	1	1	3	5	8	20.00	—	
Néstor Gorosito	ARG	8 February 2009	4 October 2009	34	10	9	15	40	49	29.41	—	
Leonardo Astrada	ARG	12 October 2009	11 April 2010	26	7	8	11	23	27	26.92	—	
Ángel Cappa	ARG	17 April 2010	7 November 2010	18	7	6	5	21	20	38.89	—	
Juan José López	ARG	16 November 2010	26 June 2011	27	10	10	7	24	24	37.04	—	
Matías Almeyda	ARG	16 August 2011	24 November 2012	60	29	22	9	98	45	48.33	—	
Gustavo Zapata*	ARG	2 December 2012		1	1	0	0	1	0	100.00	—	
Ramón Díaz	ARG	9 December 2012	24 May 2014	66	30	17	19	76	57	45.45	1 Primera División; 1 Copa Campeonato	
Marcelo Gallardo	ARG	27 July 2014	23 October 2022	425	228	111	86	756	367	53.65	1 Primera División; 3 Copa Argentina; 2 Supercopa Argentina; 1 Trofeo de Campeones; 2 Copa Libertadores; 1 Copa Sudamericana; 3 Recopa Sudamericana; 1 Suruga Bank Championship	
Martín Demichelis	ARG	28 January 2023	28 July 2024	87	52	18	17	157	80	59.77	1 Primera División; 1 Trofeo de Campeones; 1 Supercopa Argentina	
Marcelo Escudero*	ARG	4 August 2024		1	0	1	0	0	0	0.00	—	
Marcelo Gallardo	ARG	10 August 2024	26 February 2026	86	36	32	18	110	69	41.86	—	
Marcelo Escudero*	ARG	2 March 2026		1	0	1	0	1	1	0.00	—	
Eduardo Coudet	ARG	12 March 2026	26 August 2026	27	13	6	8	36	22	48.15	—	
Leonardo Ponzio	ARG	30 August 2026	Present	10	7	1	2	17	8	70.00	—	

== Most trophies won ==
As of 13 March 2024

Name	PD	NC	AFA-AUF	CONMEBOL	Worldwide	Total
(Argentina) Marcelo Gallardo	1	6	0	7	0	14
(Argentina) Ramón Díaz	6	1	0	2	0	9
(Argentina) José María Minella	6	1	1	0	0	8
(Argentina) Ángel Labruna	6	0	0	0	0	6
(Hungary) Imre Hirschl	3	1	2	0	0	6
(Italy) Renato Cesarini	2	3	1	0	0	6
(Argentina) Héctor Veira	1	0	0	1	1	3
(Argentina) Daniel Passarella	3	0	0	0	0	3
(Argentina) Martín Demichelis	1	2	0	0	0	3
(Argentina) Víctor Caamaño	1	1	0	0	0	2
(Argentina) Carlos Peucelle	1	0	1	0	0	2
(Argentina) Américo Gallego	2	0	0	0	0	2
(Argentina) Alfredo Di Stéfano	1	0	0	0	0	1
(Argentina) Carlos Griguol	0	0	0	1	0	1
(Chile) Manuel Pellegrini	1	0	0	0	0	1
(Argentina) Leonardo Astrada	1	0	0	0	0	1
(Argentina) Diego Simeone	1	0	0	0	0	1
Total	37	15	5	11	1	69
