= 1914 Tie Cup final =

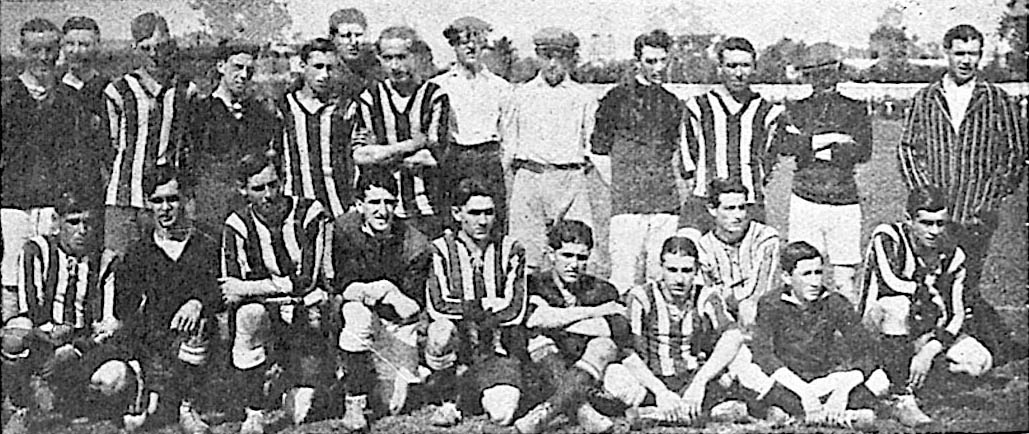
- River Plate, winners, posing with their rivals Bristol
- Event: Tie Cup
River Plate	Bristol
(Argentina)	(Uruguay)
1	0
- Date: December 20, 1914; 111 years ago
- Venue: Ferro C. Oeste, Buenos Aires
- Referee: Armando Bergalli (Argentina)
- Attendance: 15,000

The 1914 Tie Cup final was the final match to decide the winner of the Tie Cup, the 15th edition of the international competition organised by Argentine and Uruguayan Associations together. As its previous editions, the final was contested by Argentine club River Plate (champion of 1914 Copa de Competencia Jockey Club) and Uruguayan club Bristol F.C. in replacement of Nacional (1914 Uruguayan Copa de Competencia champion), as runner-up.

The match, held in Ferro Carril Oeste Stadium, was won by River Plate 1–0 with goal by Juan Gianetto. With this achievement, River Plate won its first international title.

== Qualified teams ==
Team	Qualification	Previous app.
(Argentina) River Plate	1914 Copa Competencia (A) champions	(none)
(Uruguay) Bristol	1914 Copa Competencia (U) runner-up (Note: As champion, Nacional had earned right to play in the competition, but it declined.)	(none)

== Overview ==
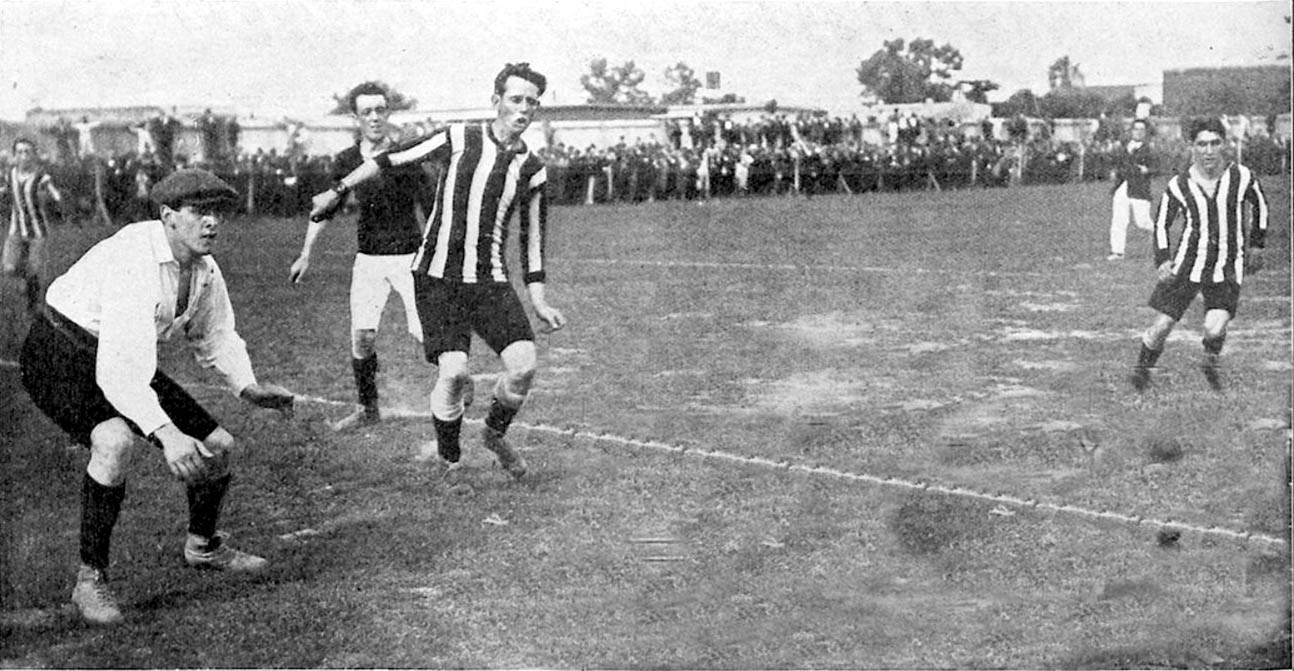
Scene of the match played at Ferro Carril Oeste

River Plate had earned to play the final after winning the 1914 Copa de Competencia Jockey Club (which was also its first official title in the top division of Argentine football) after beating Newell's Old Boys 4–0 in the final played at Estadio Racing Club in Avellaneda.

On the other side, Club Nacional de Football had won the Uruguayan Copa de Competencia that allowed them to play the final v River Plate. Nevertheless, the club alleged some difficults to attend the competition so the AUF decided to invite Bristol Football Club to represent Uruguay in the final.

Bristol added some international players for the final, they were, Martín Aphesteguy, Jorge Pacheco and Pedro Zuazú, all of them called up for Uruguay in several occasions. On the other side, River Plate had had some of its players called up for Argentina, including goalkeeper Carlos Isola that had played some friendlies vs English side Exeter City.

During the match, both teams had chances to score, but River Plate struck first when a defective defense by Uruguayan Manuel Marenco trying to intercept a pass from Rodolfo Fraga, allowed forward Luis Gianetto to score the only goal. In the second half, the referee annulled a goal to River Plate (offside). River Plate won its first international Cup.

== Match details ==
1914 Tie Cup
20 December 1914

River Plate (Argentina)	1–0	(Uruguay) Bristol
Gianetto 35'	Report

Ferro C. Oeste, Buenos Aires
Attendance: 15,000
Referee: Armando Bergalli (Argentina)

River Plate	Bristol

GK	(Argentina) Carlos Isola
DF	(Argentina) Arturo Chiappe
DF	(Argentina) Agustín Lanatta
MF	(Argentina) Atilio Peruzzi
MF	(Argentina) Cándido García
MF	(Argentina) Alfredo Elli
FW	(Argentina) Rodolfo Patrao
FW	(Argentina) Alberto Penney
FW	(Argentina) Juan Gianetto
FW	(Argentina) Alfredo Martín
FW	(Argentina) Juan Sevessi

GK	(Uruguay) Mateo Magariños
DF	(Uruguay) Martín Aphesteguy
DF	(Uruguay) Manuel Marenco
MF	(Uruguay) Jorge Pacheco
MF	(Uruguay) Emilio Bertone
MF	(Uruguay) José P. Zuazú
FW	(Uruguay) C. Pereira
FW	(Uruguay) E. Castillo
FW	(Uruguay) J. Barriola
FW	(Uruguay) E. Chiesa
FW	(Uruguay) Omar Pérez
