= Arthur Herbert Thompson =

English soldier and footballer (1890–1916)

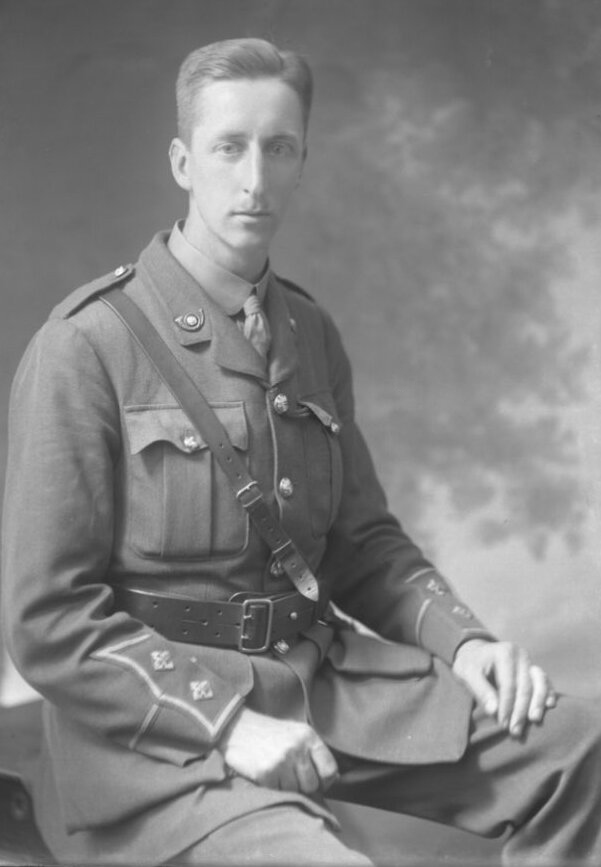
- Portrait of Thompson taken by the Essenhigh Corke brothers.

Personal information
- Date of birth: June 1890
- Place of birth: Sevenoaks, Kent, United Kingdom
- Date of death: 25 September 1916 (aged 26)
- Place of death: Gueudecourt, Somme, France
- Positions: Centre-forward; defender

Senior career*
Years	Team	Apps	(Gls)
1911–1913	Estudiantes	15	(8)
1913–1914	River Plate	4	(0)
Military career
Spouse	Milicent Emily (m. 1916)
Service years	1915–1916
Rank	Captain
Units	12th and 10th battalion, KOYLI
- * Club domestic league appearances and goals

Captain Arthur Herbert Thompson (Note: Pronounced /ˈɑːθə ˈhɜːbət ˈtɒmpsᵊn/ in British English, and /ˈɑrθər ˈhɜrbərt ˈtɑmpsən/ or /ˈɑrθər ˈhɜrbərt ˈtɑmsən/ in American English) (June 1890 – 25 September 1916) was an English soldier and amateur association football player, known for playing in the first official Superclásico of Argentine association football.

Born and raised in Sevenoaks, Thompson moved to Buenos Aires in 1911 to work as a staff member in the British Bank of South America. He started his association football career with Estudiantes, where he played from October 1911 to July 1913, making 15 appearances and scoring 8 goals. After which, he moved to River Plate, where he played the first official Superclásico in his debut for the club. He played 3 more games in 1914 before going back to England in October of that year. Thompson participated in the First World War, and died in the Battle of the Somme during the capture of Gueudecourt. He is one of the three Englishmen to have ever played in the club, and the only English River Plate player to have ever played in a Superclásico.

== Early life ==
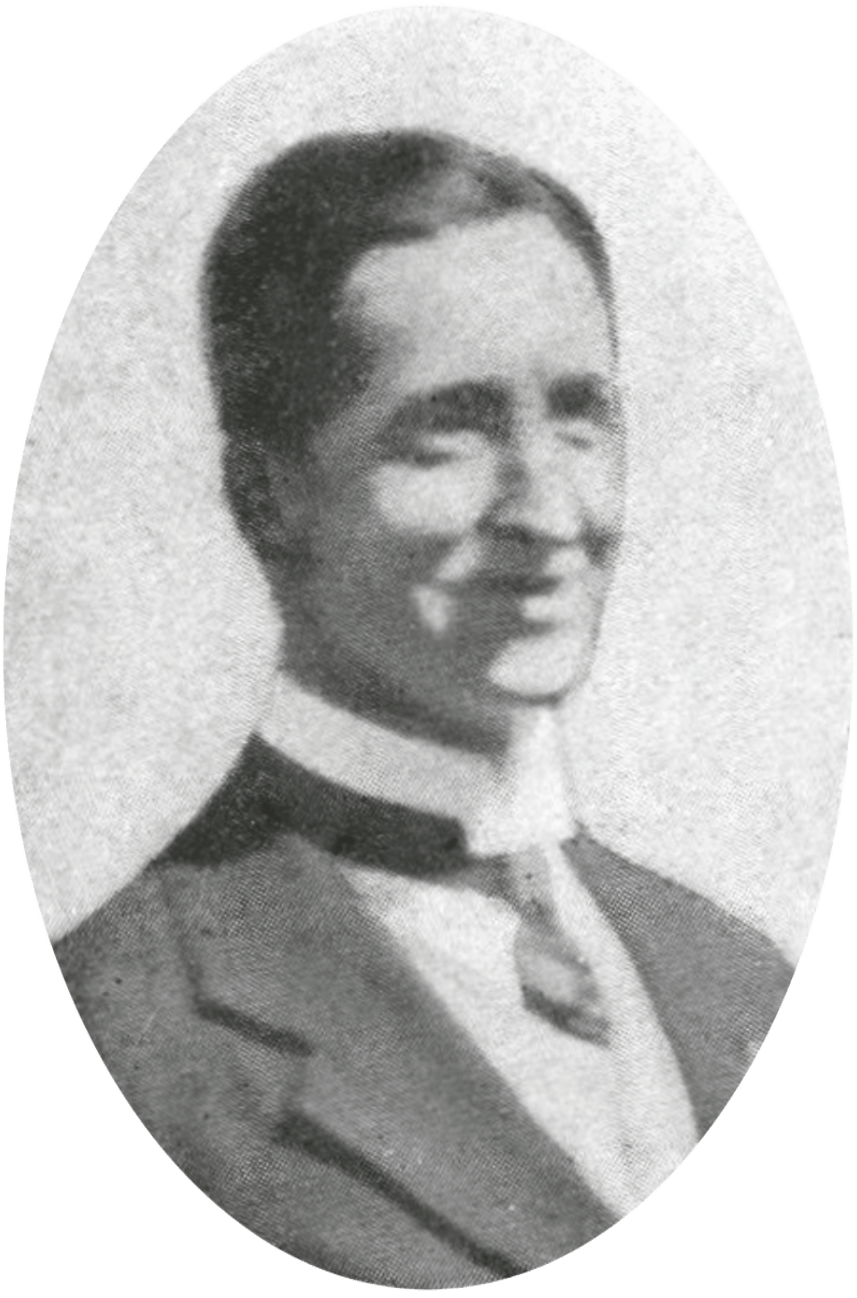
Thompson in his youth

In June 1890, Arthur Herbert Thompson was born in the town of Sevenoaks, located in the United Kingdom. He lived and grew up in his parents' residency of 6 Argyle Road, along with his two brothers: Sidney Ernest Thompson and Cecil George Thompson. His father, Arthur, worked as a superintendent in the town's post office. Thompson and Sidney both went to the Lady Boswell's School for their elementary education; nonetheless, Thompson would move to the Sevenoaks School for his high school years. In 1908, Thompson played in the starting eleven of his school's association football team. Moreover, after graduating from high school, he served in the Queen's Own West Kent Yeomanry for four years as a trooper and was the secretary of the Old Sennockians' Club, founded by ex-alumni of the Sevenoaks School.

== Career ==
=== Estudiantes ===
Thompson travelled to Argentina in 1911 to work for the British Bank of South America as a staff member. His first job at a bank was at the Union of London Bank and Smith's Bank as a clerk. His Argentine association football career started in October 1911 with Estudiantes as a centre-forward, as described by journalists of the time, where he played 15 matches and scored 8 goals. According to Andrés Burgo, Thompson scored one of his most important goals for the club in the Round of 32 of the Copa de Honor against River Plate in July 1913, where he scored the Estudiantes' third goal to comeback from 2–0 deficit in a match that ended 2–4. With this result, Estudiantes eliminated River Plate, the club whom he joined later in year.

=== River Plate ===
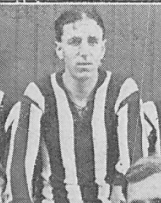
Thompson with River Plate in 1914

His first match in River Plate was on 24 August 1913 against Boca Juniors, where River won 2–1, making it the first official Superclásico (Note: River Plate and Boca Juniors disputed two friendlies before, In 2 August 1908 where Boca won 2–1 and in 15 December 1912 where Boca abandoned the match. The match played in 1913 is considered the first because it was the first official match played between both teams. (friendlies in football don't count towards official standings).) in the history of Argentine association football. In 1914, Thompson played three more matches for River Plate as a defender: a 3–0 win against Banfield, a 2–1 win against Belgrano Athletic Club, and a 2–0 loss against Racing Club. Thompson returned to England from Argentina on 3 October 1914 in the port of Liverpool, boarding the RMS Amazon. He is one of the three Englishmen to have ever played in the club, and the only English River Plate player to have ever played in a Superclásico.

== Later life and death ==
After his return to England, Thompson volunteered on 30 October 1914 to fight for the King's Own Yorkshire Light Infantry in the First World War, three months after the outbreak of the conflict. During his services, he was a lieutenant in the 12th Battalion that arrived in December 1915, but was later attached to the 10th Battalion. On 20 January 1916, he married Milicent Emily (née Taylor) at the St. Mary Church in Kippington, Sevenoaks; a honeymoon between the two was made at Folkstone. Back with his services, Thompson would become temporarily the Captain of the 10th battalion until his death in the Battle of the Somme during the Capture of Gueudecourt on 25 September 1916, After his death, his wife received this letter from Second Lieutenant F. R. Parker Dexter:

It grieves me to tell you of your husband's death in action on the 25th. Whilst gallantly leading his company to the assault, he was shot through the head; his death was instantaneous, so it was impossible for him to leave a message. Although he had only commanded his Company for a few weeks, in that short time, he had won the hearts of officers and men and the few that are left join me in sympathising with you in your very sad bereavement. Tommy, as we called him, was a great pal of one out here. Perhaps you will remember me meeting you in Newcastle? Please excuse me writing any more just now, as it upsets me to think about the last few days; but if you care to write to me, I shall only be too glad to write a little later.

His obituary would be published by the Sevenoaks Chronicle on 6 October 1916, which is cited by the Sevenoaks War Memorial, where he is remembered. Furthermore, Thompson is also remembered in the Thiepval Memorial at the Pier and Face 11 C and 12 A section and in the Anglican Cathedral of St. John the Baptist in Buenos Aires.

== Career statistics ==
Appearances and goals by club, season and competition
Club	Season	League and Copa de Honor		
Club	Season	Division	Apps	Goals
Club Atlético Estudiantes	1911-1913	Primera División	15	8
Club Atlético Estudiantes	Total		15	8
River Plate	1913	Primera División	1	0
River Plate	1914	Primera División	3	0
River Plate	Total		4	0
Career total			19	8

== Military awards ==
Thompson's decorations, awards, and badges include, among others:

1st row	Victory Medal	British War Medal

== Notes ==
=== Works cited ===
- Ball, Matthew (15 October 2014). Sevenoaks War Memorial: The Men Remembered. Amberley Publishing Limited. ISBN 978-1-4456-4294-9.
- "Promotions , Appointments, &c.". The Army List. London, United Kingdom: War Office, Government of the United Kingdom. December 1914.
- Bond, Reginald Copleston (1926). History of the King's Own Yorkshire Light Infantry: 1914-1918. Vol. III. P. Lund, Humphries & Company.
- "10th Battalion K.O. Yorkshire L.I. War Diary". King's Own Yorkshire Light Infantry (September 1916).
- Estévez, Diego Ariel; Lodise, Sergio Alberto (2006). 105: historia de un siglo rojo y blanco (in Spanish). Buenos Aires: Ed. Continente. ISBN 978-950-754-198-8.
