= Arturo Penney =

Argentinian footballer

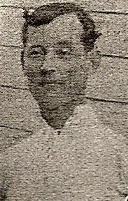

Personal information
- Full name: Arturo Patricio Penney
- Date of birth: March 17, 1887
- Place of birth: Buenos Aires, Argentina
- Date of death: ?
- Position: Forward

Senior career*
Years	Team	Apps	(Gls)
1906–1910	Boca Juniors		
- * Club domestic league appearances and goals

Arturo Penney (1884–1946) was an Argentine amateur footballer, who played as forward in Boca Juniors.

Penney was born in Buenos Aires, the brother of Alberto Penney. In 1908 he made his debut in the Club Boca Juniors against Belgrano Athletic, with a result 3–1 in favor of Boca. Penney played for the Boca team until 1910.

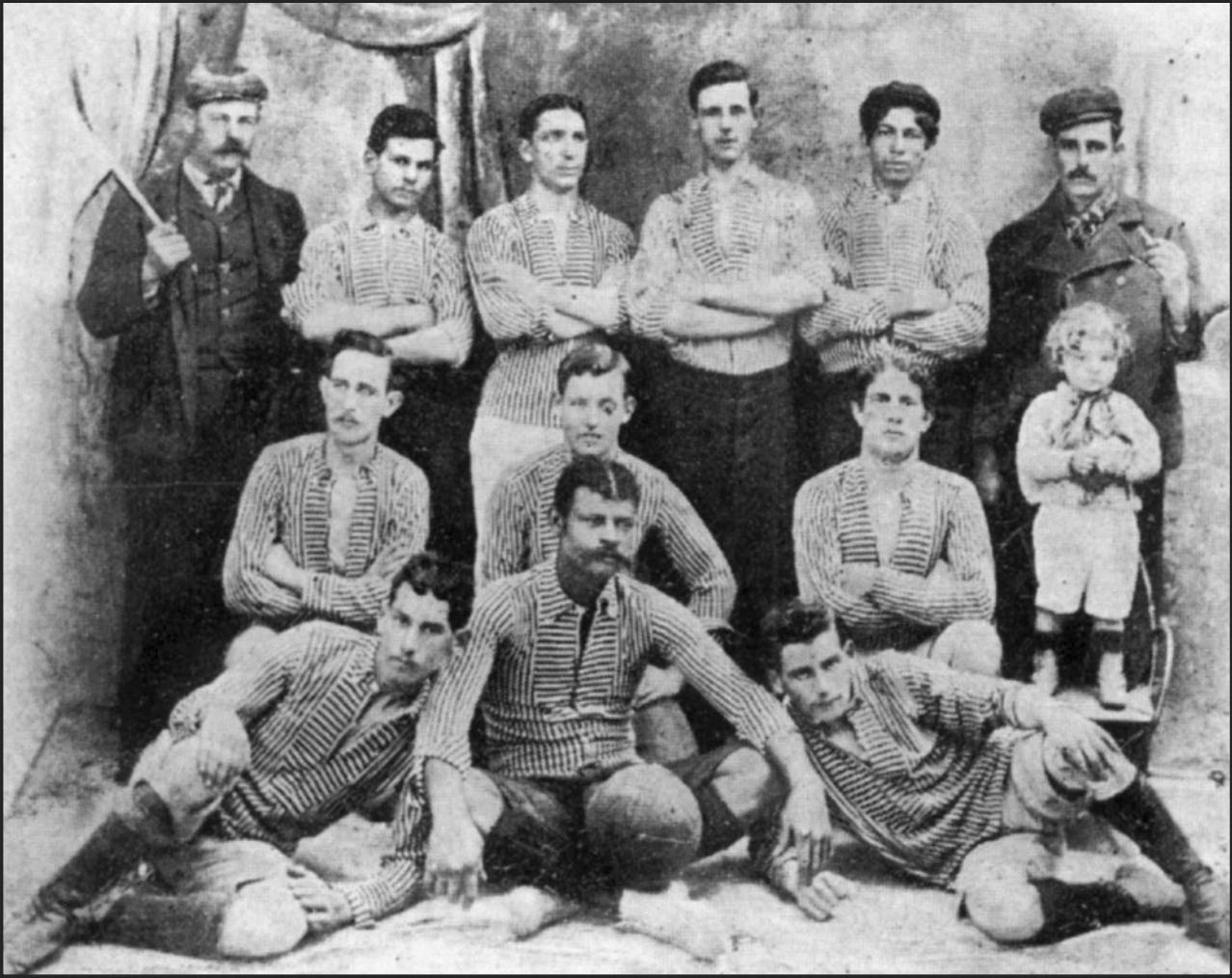
Boca Juniors team 1906

Arturo Penney finished his playing career in the Club Atlético Atlanta.
