= 1914 Copa Jockey Club final =

1914 Copa de Competencia Jockey Club Final
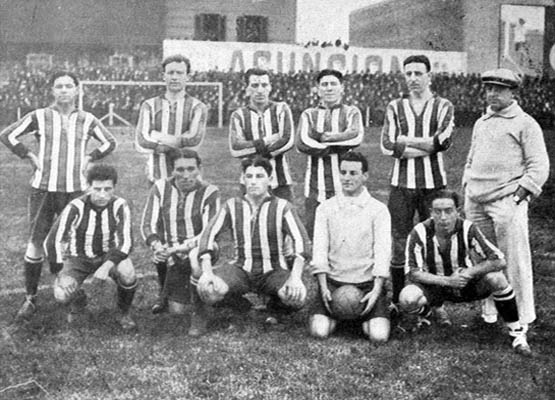
- A River Plate team of 1914
- Event: 1914 Copa de Competencia
River Plate	Newell's Old Boys
4	0
- Date: 15 November 1914
- Venue: Racing Stadium

The 1914 Copa de Competencia Jockey Club final was the football match that decided the champion of the 8th. edition of this National cup of Argentina. In the match, held in Racing Club Stadium in Avellaneda on November 15, 1914, River Plate defeated Rosarian club Newell's Old Boys 4–0.

It was the first official title won by River Plate in the top division of Argentine football.

== Qualified teams ==
Team	Previous final app.
River Plate	(none)
Newell's Old Boys	1909

Note

- **Bold** indicates winning years

== Overview ==
The 1914 edition was contested by 15 clubs, 14 within Buenos Aires Province and 1 from Liga Rosarina de Football (Newell's Old Boys) that entered directly to the final. River Plate reached the final after beating Belgrano A.C. (5–1 in group of 16), San Isidro (1–1, 2–1 in playoff), Ferro Carril Oeste (2–1 in quarter final) and Racing (2–1 in semifinal).

== Road to the final ==
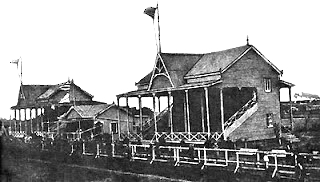
Racing Stadium, venue of the final

River Plate		Round	Newell's Old Boys	
Opponent	Result	Group stage	Opponent	Result
Belgrano A.C.	5–1 (A)	Round of 16	– (Note: Newell's qualified directly for the final, as they were the 1914 Rosario champions.)	
San Isidro	1–1, 2–1 (H)	Round of 8	–	
Ferro Carril Oeste	2–1 (H)	Quarter final	–	
Racing	2–1 (A)	Semifinal	–	

== Match details ==
1914 Copa Competencia Final
15 November 1914

River Plate	4–0	Newell's Old Boys
Penney; Fraga Patrao; C. García; Sevesi	Report

Estadio Racing Club, Avellaneda (Note: Some sources state the match was played in Dársena Sur, but other versions state River Plate did not have a field in 1914 and played its home games at Ferro C. Oeste stadium. A third part specifies that the team played the final at Estadio Racing Club, according to media of that time.)

**River Plate**	**Newell's**

GK	(Argentina) Carlos Isola
DF	(Argentina) Arturo Chiappe
DF	(Argentina) Alfredo Elli
MF	(Argentina) Atilio Peruzzi
MF	(Argentina) Cándido García
MF	(Argentina) Granuetto
FW	(Argentina) Rodolfo Fraga
FW	(Argentina) Alfredo Martín
FW	(Argentina) Alberto Penney
FW	(Argentina) Juan Sevessi
FW	(Argentina) Cipressini

GK	José Airaldi
DF	Tomás Hamblin
DF	Cayetano Blotta
MF	Julio Ongay
MF	Caraciolo González
MF	Tovelli
FW	P. Flamini
FW	J. Povey
FW	G. Goyenechea
FW	José Viale
FW	Anacleto Ongay
