= Juan Garibaldi =

Argentine footballer

Personal information
- Full name: Juan Lorenzo Garibaldi
- Date of birth: 1893
- Date of death: 5 August 1970 (aged 76/77)
- Position: Defender

Senior career*
Years	Team	Apps	(Gls)
1911–1914	Boca Juniors	15	(0)

International career
1912	Argentina	1	(0)
- * Club domestic league appearances and goals

Juan Lorenzo Garibaldi (1893 – 5 August 1970) was an Argentine footballer. He was capped by the Argentina national team in 1912, playing against Uruguay in a 2–0 win. He played club football for Boca Juniors.

== Career statistics ==
=== International ===
National team	Year	Apps	Goals
Argentina	1912	1	0
Total		1	0
