= Alberto Penney =

Argentinian footballer

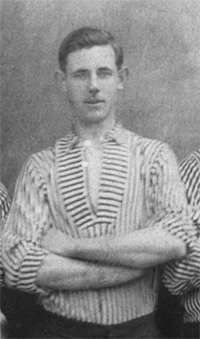

Personal information
- Full name: Alberto Juan Penney
- Place of birth: Buenos Aires, Argentina
- Date of death: ?
- Position: Midfielder

Youth career
- 1905–1910: Boca Juniors

Senior career*
Years	Team	Apps	(Gls)
1911–1917	River Plate		
- * Club domestic league appearances and goals

Alberto Penney (1888–1945) was an Argentine footballer, who played in Boca Juniors and River Plate.

== Biography ==
Alberto Penney was born in Buenos Aires, son of British immigrants. In 1905 he was incorporated with his brother Arturo Patricio Penney, into the team of Boca Juniors, participating in tournaments second division of Argentina. In 1912 Penney was transferred to River Plate, playing the championship of that year, where he had scored 2 goals. In the championship 1913, he scoring 13 goals for River, and participated in the first Superclásico against Boca Juniors.

In 1914 Penney played the Copa de Competencia Jockey Club and the Tie Cup, both titles won by River.

=== Titles ===
Season	Team	Title
1914	Club Atlético River Plate	Copa de Competencia
1914	Club Atlético River Plate	Tie Cup
