= Banco Británico de la América del Sud =

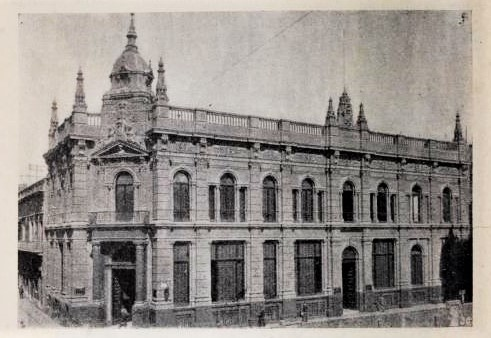
- view of the Banco Británico de la América del Sud
- Company type: Private company
- Industry: Banking and Financial services
- Predecessor: English Bank of Rio de Janeiro (Banco Inglés de Rio de Janeiro)
- Founded: 1888
- Defunct: 1923
- Successor: ?
- Headquarters: Buenos Aires, Argentina
- Area served: Argentina, Uruguay and Brazil

Banco Británico de la América del Sud (lit. 'British Bank of South America') was a British banking institution with headquarters in Buenos Aires that operated in Argentina, Uruguay and Brazil between 1888 and 1923.

Its headquarters were located in Buenos Aires on the corner of Bartolomé Mitre Avenue and Reconquista Street. This later became the headquarters of the Banco de la Nación Argentina.

== History ==
Montevideo branch

Its headquarters was first located at Calle de la Piedad No. 400, barrio de San Nicolás, Buenos Aires, in front of the headquarters of the Bank of London and South America and Banco de Londres y Río de la Plata. It was built on land belonging to the main families of the colonial period of Buenos Aires.

This institution was originally established under the name Banco Inglés de Rio de Janeiro in 1888, and it was refounded with the name of Banco Británico de la América del Sud in 1891. It had several branches in South America, including Rio de Janeiro and Montevideo.
