= José María Minella =

Argentine footballer and manager

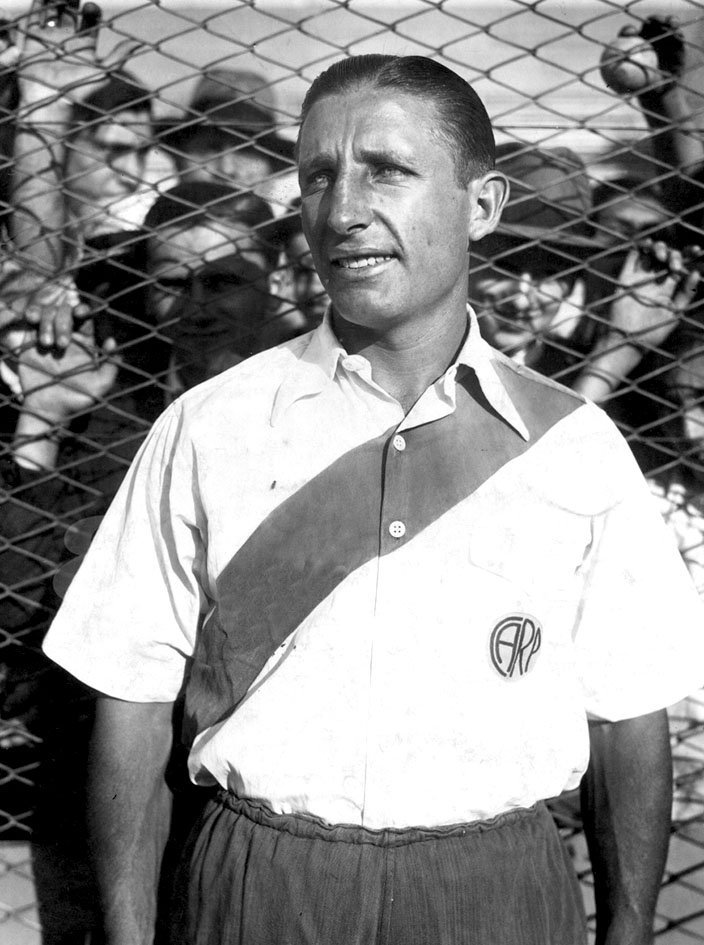
- Minella playing for River Plate in 1937

Personal information
- Date of birth: 9 August 1909
- Place of birth: Mar del Plata, Argentina
- Date of death: 13 August 1981 (aged 72)
- Position: Midfielder

Youth career
- Independiente MdP

Senior career*
| Years | Team | Apps | (Gls) |
| –1929 | Independiente MdP | | |
| 1929–1934 | Gimnasia La Plata | 132 | (0) |
| 1935–1943 | River Plate | 157 | (5) |
| 1942–1943 | → Peñarol (loan) | | |
| 1944 | Green Cross | | |

International career
| 1933–1941 | Argentina | 24 | (1) |

Managerial career
- 1944: Green Cross
- 1947–1959: River Plate
- 1960: Newell's Old Boys
- 1963: River Plate
- 1964–1965: Argentina
- 1966: América de Cali
- * Club domestic league appearances and goals

José María Minella (9 August 1909 – 13 August 1981) was an Argentine football player and manager. Minella played and then coached the historic River Plate team known as La Maquina, its successor, La Maquinita, and the Argentina national team. Minella is also the third coach with the most honours in all River Plate history.

== Club career ==
A midfielder, Minella started playing at local club Independiente of Mar del Plata. On 23 August 1925, he was part of the local league team that achieved a 1–0 win over a team made of battleship HMS Repulse´s crewmembers during the Prince of Wales visit to Argentina. In 1928 he was signed by Gimnasia La Plata who won the amateur Argentine championship in 1929. He played in the team nicknamed El Expreso ("The Express") that nearly won the championship in 1933.

In 1935, he moved to River Plate where he was part of three championship-winning teams in 1936, 1937 and 1941.

Towards the end of his playing career he played in Uruguay with Peñarol (loan from River Plate) and in Chile with Green Cross.

== International career ==
Minella made his international debut in 1933. He played three times in the Copa América, in 1935, 1937 and 1941. Argentina won the 1937 and 1941 editions. He played a total of 24 games for his country, netting one goal.

== Managerial career ==
Minella took over as manager of River Plate in 1945 and led the team through one of the most successful eras in its history. Between 1952 and 1957, they won five championships in six years, including the club's second treble in the professional era (1955, 1956 and 1957). He also won the Copa Aldao in 1947.

Minella had a spell as manager of the Argentina national team between 1964 and 1965; he returned as caretaker manager for one game in 1968. As national coach, he won the Taça das Nações played in Brazil in 1964.

== Legacy ==
In preparation for the 1978 FIFA World Cup, a football stadium was built in Mar del Plata and named Estadio José María Minella after his death in 1981 to honour Mar del Plata's most significant football talent.

== Honours ==
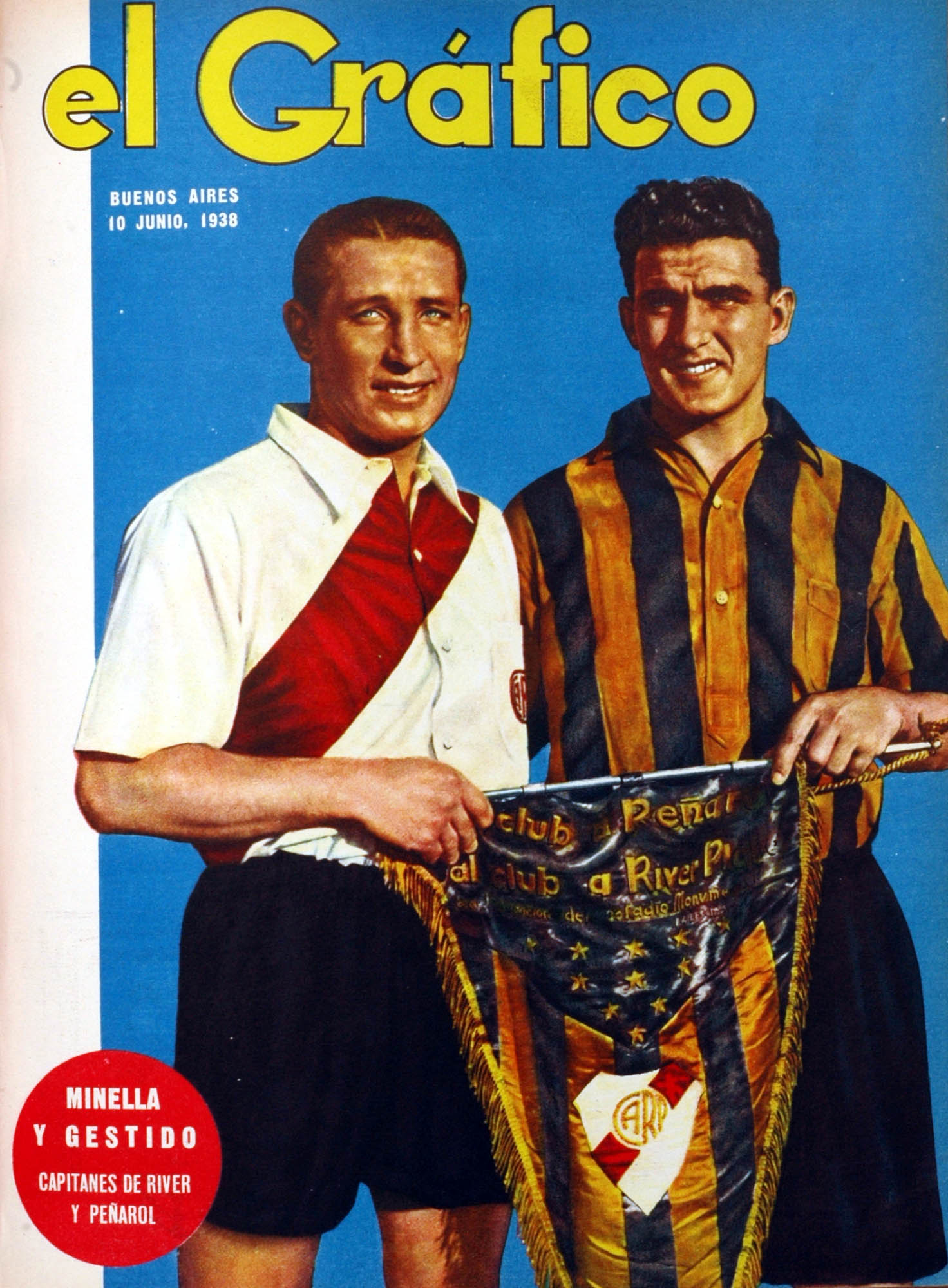
Minella (River) and Gestido (Peñarol) before a friendly match in 1938

=== Player ===
Gimnasia La Plata

- Argentine Primera División: 1929

River Plate

- Primera División Argentina: 1936, 1937, 1941
- Copa Aldao: 1937

Argentina

- Copa América: 1937, 1941

=== Manager ===
River Plate

- Argentine Primera División: 1945, 1947, 1952, 1953, 1955, 1956, 1957
- Copa Aldao: 1947
- Copa Ibarguren: 1952
- South American Championship of Champions runner-up: 1948

Argentina

- Taça das Nações: 1964
