= Heriberto Simmons =

Argentine footballer

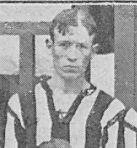

Personal information
- Date of birth: 1890
- Place of birth: Buenos Aires, Argentina
- Date of death: 1950 (aged 59–60)
- Place of death: Buenos Aires, Argentina
- Position: Midfielder

Senior career*
Years	Team	Apps	(Gls)
1913–1923	Club Atlético River Plate		

International career
1916–1918	Argentina		
- * Club domestic league appearances and goals

Heriberto Simmons was an Argentine amateur footballer, who played in Club Atlético River Plate, and the Argentina national team.

== Biography ==
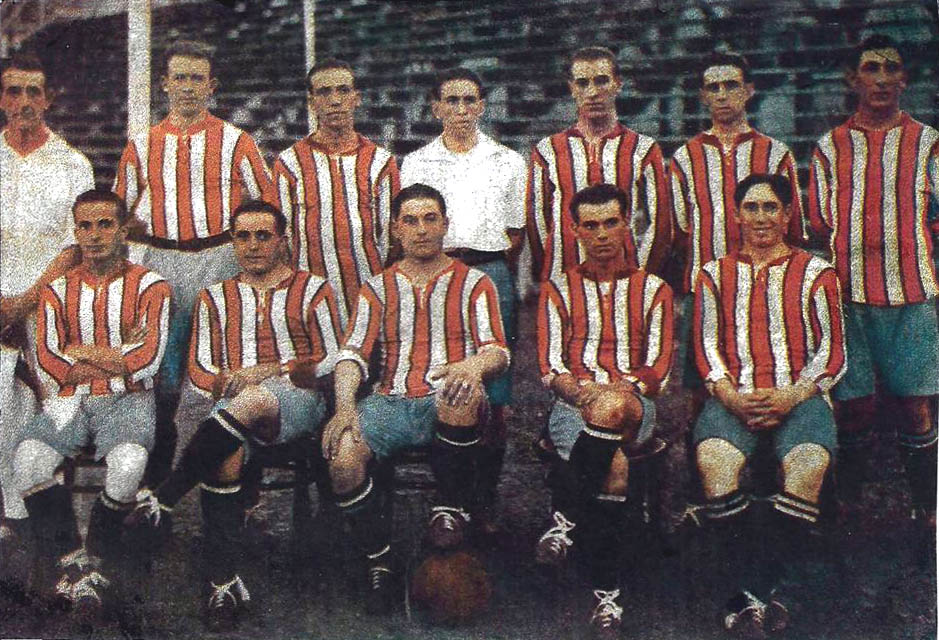
River Plate team 1920

Simmons was born in Buenos Aires, son of a family of English roots. He made its debut in 1913 as midfielder on the River Plate. On August 24, 1913, River played its first classic against Boca Juniors. The match was played in Avellaneda, with a score of 2–1 in favor of River. The formation of River team was Carlos Isola; Arturo Chiappe, Pedro Calneggia; Heriberto Simmons, Cándido García; Atilio Peruzzi; Luis Galeano, Antonio Ameral Pereyra; Alberto Penney, Fernando Roldán and Roberto Graga Patrao.

In 1914, Simmons obtained the Copa de Competencia. That same year he won the Copa de Competencia Chevallier Boutell, playing against Bristol Football Club, and on January 9, 1921, he obtains its second national championship also playing for River.

In 1916 Heriberto Simmons played for the Selección Argentina winning the titles Copa Newton and the Copa Círculo de la Prensa, final vs Uruguay played at the stadium of Avellaneda, with an Argentine triumph 7–2, with goals scored by Hiller 3, Hayes 2, Simmons and Cabano (ar).

=== Titles ===
Season	Team	Title
1914	Club Atlético River Plate	Copa de Competencia Jockey Club
1914	Club Atlético River Plate	Tie Cup
1916	Argentina national football team	Copa Newton
1916	Argentina national football team	Copa Círculo de la Prensa
1920	Club Atlético River Plate	Campeonato de Primera División
