= Cándido García =

Argentine footballer

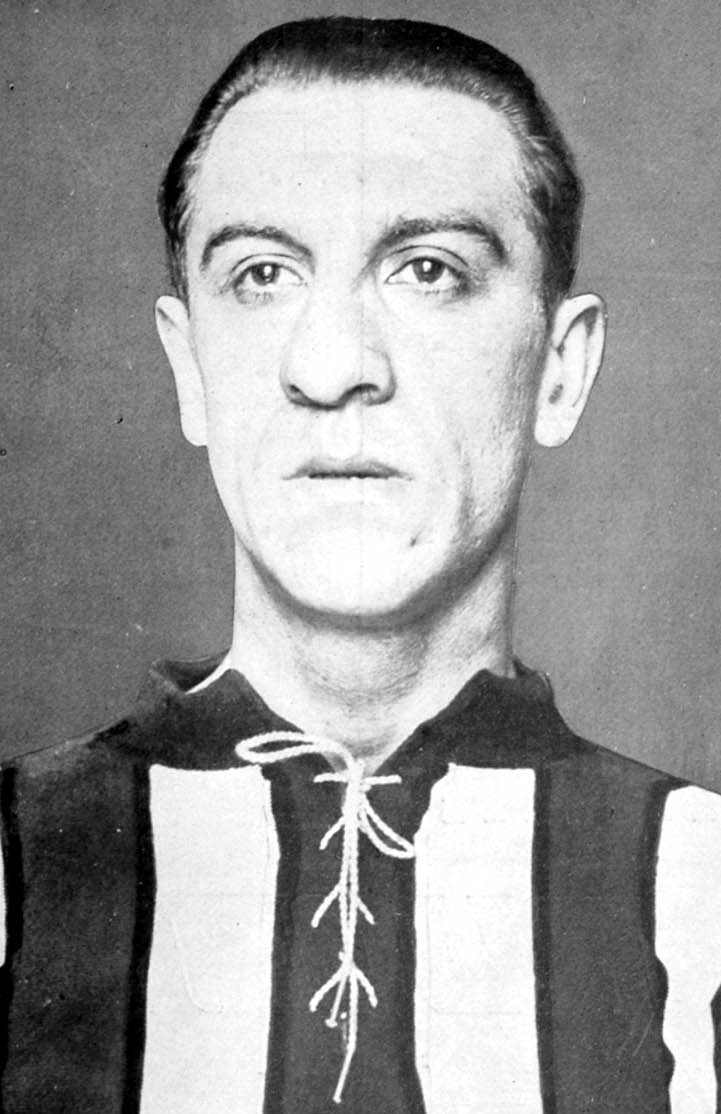

Personal information
- Date of birth: 2 December 1895
- Date of death: 22 April 1971 (aged 75)
- Position: Centre-half

Senior career*
Years	Team	Apps	(Gls)
1913–1927	River Plate		

International career
1915–1923	Argentina	6	(0)
Medal record
Men's football
Representing Argentina
South American Championship
Runner-up	1916 Argentina
- * Club domestic league appearances and goals

Cándido García (2 December 1895 – 22 April 1971) was an Argentine footballer who played as a centre-half. García spent his entire career at River Plate, where he played from 1913 to 1927, winning three titles.

García also played six matches for the Argentina national football team from 1915 to 1923. He was part of Argentina's squad for the 1916 South American Championship.

Nicknamed Cabeza de Oro ("golden head") due to his skills to head the ball, García is regarded for having scored the first official goal in the history of Superclásico v Boca Juniors on 24 August 1913 at Racing Stadium, which River won 2–1. According to journalists of his time, García's high accuracy in scoring goals by heading the ball in corner kicks forced rivals to avoid conceding corner kicks.

During his entire career at River, García played a total of 364 matches, scoring 42 goals.

== Honours ==
River Plate

- Copa de Competencia Jockey Club: 1914
- Tie Cup: 1914
- Primera División: 1920
