= Pablo Comelles =

Argentine footballer

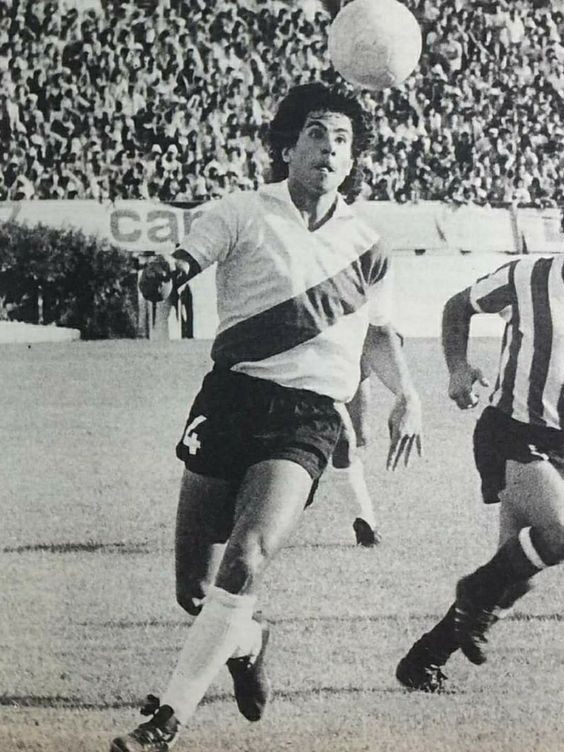
- Comelles with River Plate

Personal information
- Full name: Pablo Agustín Comelles
- Date of birth: 4 July 1954
- Place of birth: San Vicente, Argentina
- Date of death: 23 August 2018 (aged 64)
- Place of death: Villa Allende, Argentina
- Position: Defender

Senior career*
| Years | Team | Apps | (Gls) |
| 1974 | Talleres de Córdoba | 18 | (1) |
| 1975–1981 | River Plate | 163 | (3) |
| 1982 | San Lorenzo | 35 | (1) |
| 1983 | Boca Juniors | 11 | (0) |
| 1984 | Belgrano | 15 | (0) |
| 1986 | Atlanta | 5 | (0) |
| 1987–1989 | Club Cipolletti | 46 | (0) |
- * Club domestic league appearances and goals

Pablo Agustín Comelles (4 July 1954 – 23 August 2018) was an Argentine footballer and manager who played as a defender.

== Club career ==
Comelles made his debut with Talleres de Córdoba in 1974. A year later, he signed with River Plate along with teammate Héctor Ártico and manager Ángel Labruna. Comelles played at River Plate from 1975 to 1981, winning six titles. He then went on to play for San Lorenzo in 1982, Boca Juniors in 1983 and Belgrano in 1984.

== Managerial career ==
As manager, Comelles won three Torneo Argentino A titles with Juventud Antoniana, Independiente Rivadavia and General Paz Juniors.

== Honours ==
=== Club ===
River Plate

- Argentine Primera División: 1975 Metropolitano, 1975 Nacional, 1977 Metropolitano, 1979 Metropolitano, 1979 Nacional, 1980 Metropolitano
