= Carlos Isola =

Argentine footballer

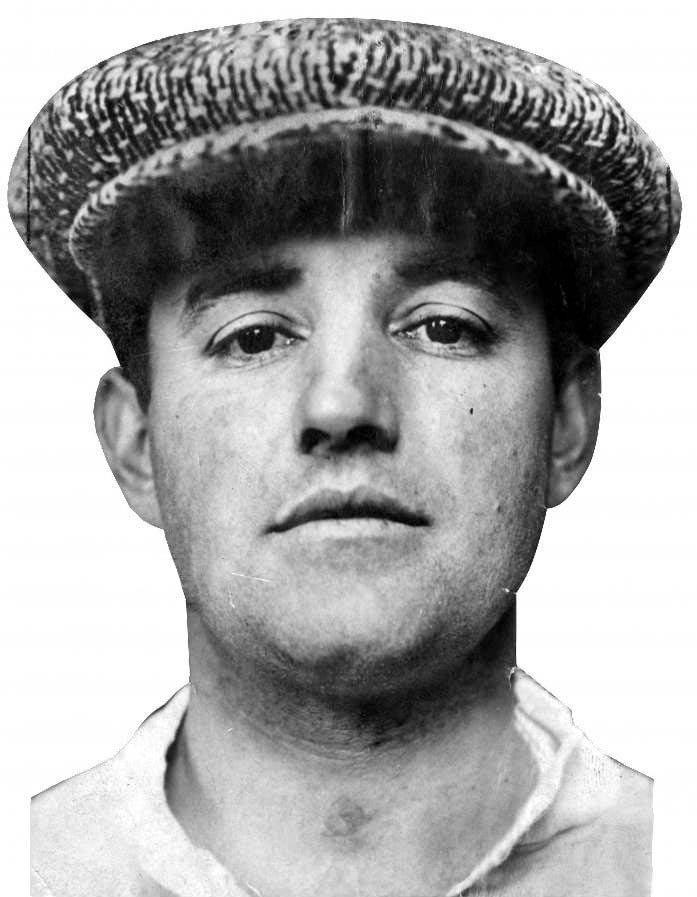

Personal information
- Date of birth: 6 March 1896
- Place of birth: La Boca, Buenos Aires, Argentina
- Date of death: 8 February 1964 (aged 67)
- Place of death: Bernal, Buenos Aires Province, Argentina
- Position: Goalkeeper

Senior career*
Years	Team	Apps	(Gls)
1913–1925	River Plate	108	(2)

International career
1915–1919	Argentina	22	(0)
Medal record
Men's football
Representing Argentina
South American Championship
Runner-up	1916 Argentina
Runner-up	1917 Uruguay
Third place	1919 Brazil
- * Club domestic league appearances and goals

Carlos Isola (6 March 1896 – 8 February 1964) was an Argentine professional football player who played as goalkeeper. He played for River Plate from 1913 to 1925, and in 22 matches for the Argentina national football team in 1916. He was also part of Argentina's squad for the 1916, 1917 and 1919 South American Championships.

Isola won three titles with River Plate.

== Biography ==
Upon joining River Plate, Isola originally played as an inside left, a position now known as a left winger or attacking midfielder.

However, due to a lack of goalkeepers, Isola stepped into the role and quickly made it his own. With River Plate, he scored two goals from penalties during his career—one as a goalkeeper on Sunday, April 5, 1914, against Banfield, and another as an outfield player on Sunday, November 22, 1918, against Porteño.

During his tenure with the club, Isola won the Copa de Competencia Jockey Club and the Tie Cup in 1914, as well as the 1920 Argentine Primera División.

Isola retired from football in 1925 at the age of 28 to pursue new career opportunities, as football was not financially rewarding at the time.

== Honours ==
River Plate

- Copa de Competencia Jockey Club: 1914
- Tie Cup: 1914
- Primera División: 1920

Argentina

- Copa América runner-up: 1916, 1917
