= Arturo Chiappe =

Argentine footballer

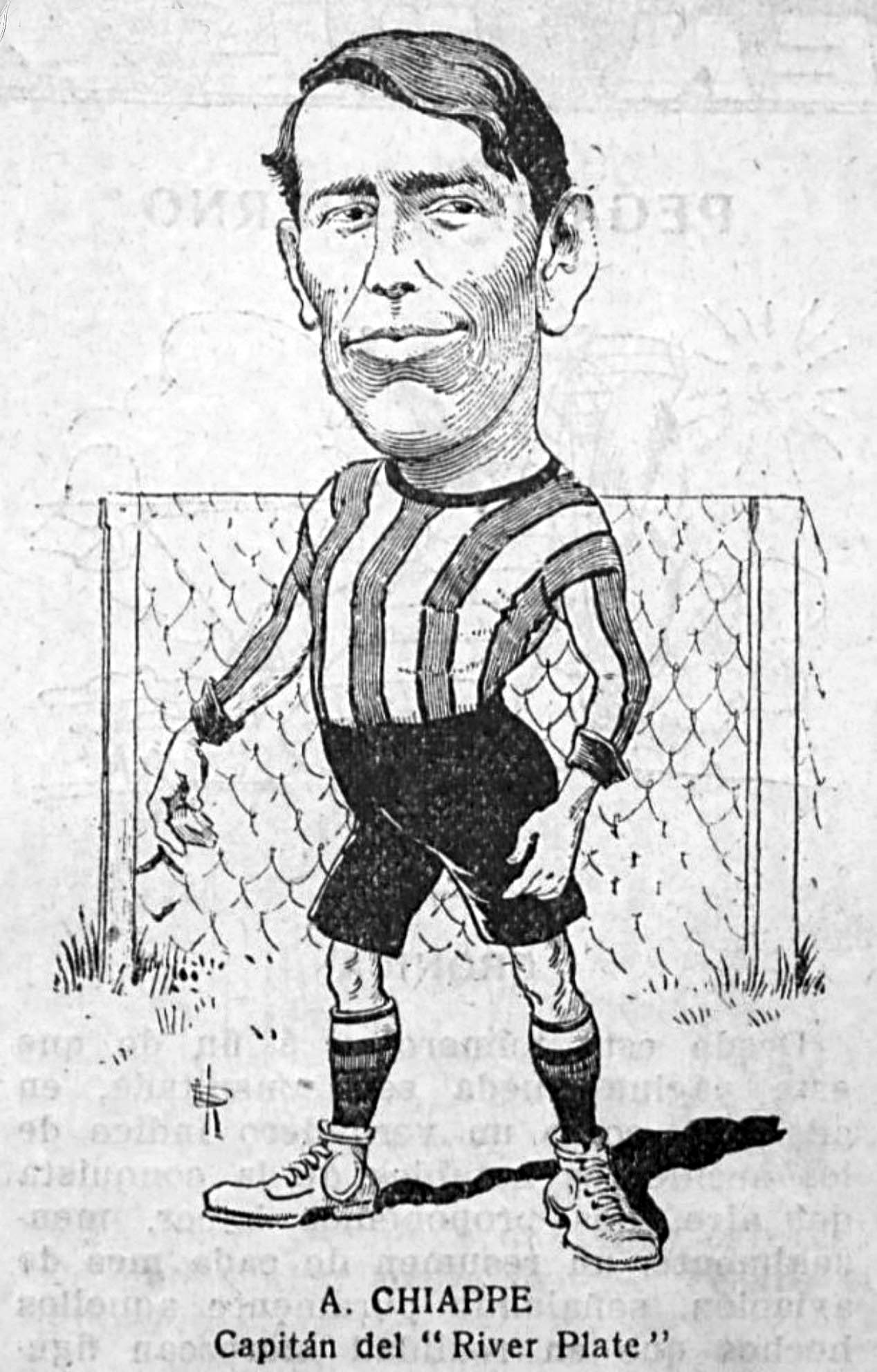
- Chiappe depicted on a caricature published in Mundo Argentino, 1911

Personal information
- Date of birth: 24 March 1889
- Date of death: 7 January 1952 (aged 62)
- Position: Defender

Senior career*
| Years | Team | Apps | (Gls) |
| 1908–1920 | River Plate | | |

International career
| 1910–1916 | Argentina | 16 | (0) |
Medal record
Men's football
Representing Argentina
South American Championship
| Runner-up | 1916 Argentina |
- * Club domestic league appearances and goals

Arturo Chiappe (24 March 1889 – 7 January 1952) was an Argentine footballer. He played in 16 matches for the Argentina national football team from 1910 to 1916. He was also part of Argentina's squad for the 1916 South American Championship.
