= José Ramos (Argentine footballer) =

Argentine footballer (1919–1969)

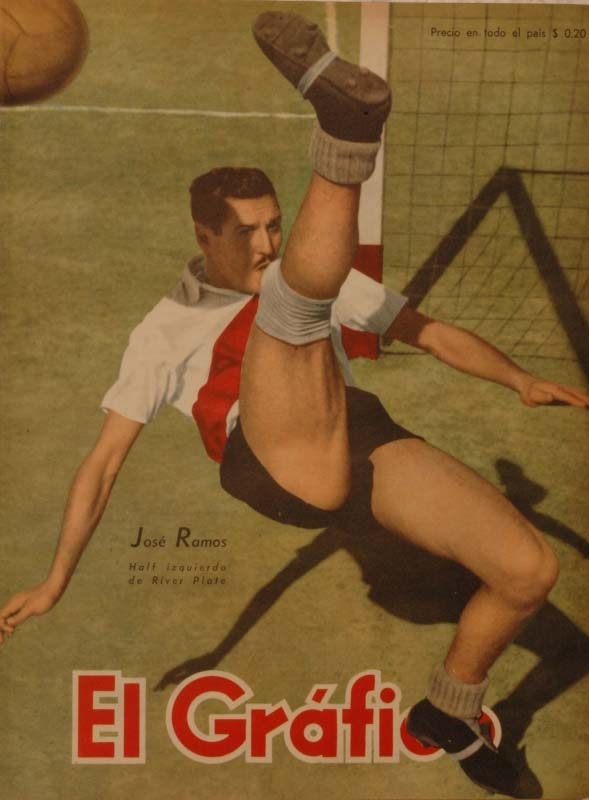

Personal information
- Date of birth: 23 February 1919
- Place of birth: Rosario, Santa fe, Argentina
- Date of death: 11 May 1969 (aged 50)
- Place of death: Rosario, Santa fe, Argentina
- Position: Defender

International career
Years	Team	Apps	(Gls)
1942–1946	Argentina	11	(0)

José Ramos (23 February 1919 – 11 May 1969) was an Argentine footballer. He played in eleven matches for the Argentina national football team from 1942 to 1946. He was also part of Argentina's squad for the 1946 South American Championship.

== Honours ==
River Plate

- Argentine Primera División: 1941, 1942, 1945, 1947, 1952
- Copa Ibarguren: 1941, 1942
- Copa Adrián C. Escobar: 1941
- Copa Aldao: 1941, 1945, 1947
- South American Championship of Champions runner-up: 1948

Argentina

- Copa América: 1946
