= 1920 Argentine Primera División =

29th season of top-tier football league in Argentina

Primera División
- Season: 1920
- Dates: 21 March 1920 – 9 January 1921
- Champions: Boca Juniors (AFA); River Plate (AAmF)
- 1920 Copa Aldao: Boca Juniors

The 1920 Argentine Primera División was the 29th season of top-flight football in Argentina. The AFA season began on March 21 and ended in January 1921 while the AAmF began on March 28 and also ended in January 1921.

Boca Juniors won its 2nd. consecutive AFA championship while River Plate won the dissident Asociación Amateurs de Football (AAmF) title, putting an ended to the seven consecutive titles won by Racing.

As champion of the AFA season, Boca Juniors qualified to the 1920 Copa Aldao.

== Final tables ==
=== Asociación Argentina de Football - Copa Campeonato ===
Primera División (AFA)
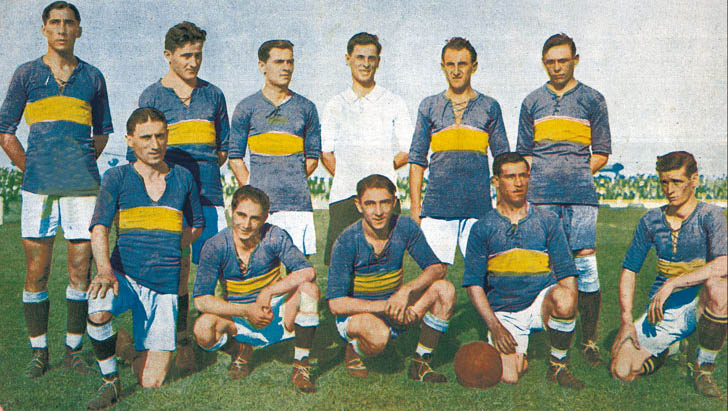
- Boca Juniors, AFA champions
- Season: 1920
- Dates: 21 March 1920 – 9 January 1921
- Champions: Boca Juniors (2nd title)
- Promoted: Banfield; Del Plata; Sp. del Norte; Nueva Chicago; Lanús; Sportivo Barracas; Sportivo Palermo
- Relegated: (none)
- 1920 Copa Aldao: Boca Juniors
- Top goalscorer: (Argentina) Fausto Lucarelli (Banfield) (15 goals)
- Biggest home win: Boca Juniors 7–0 N. Chicago
- Biggest away win: Sp. Palermo 0–6 Sp. Almagro

Club Eureka disappeared when merging with Sportivo Palermo while the Association expanded the number of to 13 clubs participating. Banfield returned to Primera after promoting the last year while Sportivo Barracas came from rival league "Asociación Amateurs de Football". The rest of the teams were promoted to Primera through a resolution by the association, they were Del Plata, Sportivo del Norte (then Colegiales), Nueva Chicago, Lanús, and Sportivo Palermo.

Pos	Team	Pld	W	D	L	GF	GA	GD	Pts
1	Boca Juniors (C)	24	20	3	1	52	7	+45	43
2	Banfield	24	13	5	6	35	21	+14	31
3	Huracán	24	13	5	6	38	26	+12	31
4	Porteño	24	13	4	7	31	26	+5	30
5	Del Plata	24	10	6	8	22	27	−5	26
6	Sportivo Barracas	24	10	5	9	26	28	−2	25
7	Nueva Chicago	24	10	3	11	17	36	−19	23
8	Sportivo del Norte	24	9	4	11	19	47	−28	22
9	Estudiantes (LP)	24	10	1	13	34	37	−3	21
10	Sportivo Palermo	24	8	3	13	26	52	−26	19
11	Lanús	24	5	5	14	26	12	+14	15 (Note: Lanús abandoned the AAF to join the AAm after the 13th round of fixtures. The remaining 12 fixtures were awarded as wins to its opponents)
12	Sportivo Almagro	24	4	3	17	16	9	+7	11 (Note: Sportivo Almagro abandoned the AAF to join the AAm after the 13th round of fixtures. The remaining 12 fixtures were awarded as wins to its opponents)
13	Palermo	24	4	1	19	14	28	−14	9

(C) Champions

=== Asociación Amateurs de Football ===
Primera División (AAmF)
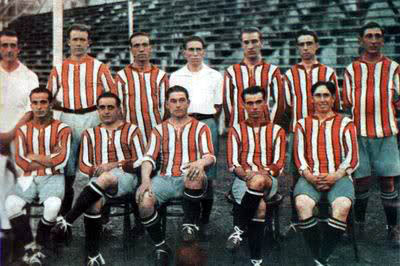
- River Plate, AAmF champions
- Season: 1920
- Dates: 28 March 1920 – 9 January 1921
- Champions: River Plate (1st title)
- Promoted: Barracas Central; Ferro Carril Oeste; Sp. Buenos Aires
- Relegated: (none)
- Top goalscorer: (Argentina) Santiago Carreras (Vélez Sársfield) (19 goals)
- Biggest home win: Racing 7–0 Tigre
- Biggest away win: Estudiantes (BA) 0–10 Independiente

The tournament started with 17 teams then expanded to 19 when Lanús and Sportivo Almagro (that had previously left the Asociación Argentina) joined the league. Ferro Carril Oeste returned to the league after being relegated 2 years before. Barracas Central debuted in Primera after winning the Primera B (Aam) title last year. Sportivo Buenos Aires also debuted in the top division.

Pos	Team	Pld	W	D	L	GF	GA	GD	Pts
1	River Plate (C)	34	25	6	3	70	22	+48	56
2	Racing	34	25	4	5	77	23	+54	54
3	San Lorenzo	34	17	12	5	58	30	+28	46
4	Atlanta	34	17	7	10	49	29	+20	41
5	Gimnasia y Esgrima (LP)	34	17	7	10	46	32	+14	41
6	Vélez Sársfield	34	17	5	12	60	32	+28	39
7	Platense	34	16	5	13	51	39	+12	37
8	Independiente	34	12	11	11	58	47	+11	35
9	San Isidro	34	12	9	13	52	53	−1	33
10	Quilmes	34	13	6	15	35	48	−13	32
11	Estudiantil Porteño	34	9	12	13	38	42	−4	30
12	Ferro Carril Oeste	34	12	6	16	34	61	−27	30
13	Defensores de Belgrano	34	9	9	16	28	40	−12	27
14	Barracas Central	34	9	8	17	28	49	−21	26
15	Tigre	34	9	4	21	38	77	−39	22
16	Sportivo Buenos Aires	34	6	6	22	33	64	−31	18
17	Sportivo Almagro	17	6	5	6	22	21	+1	17 (Note: Sportivo Almagro defected from the AAF league at the halfway stage, therefore played half as many games as the rest of the league.)
18	Lanús	17	6	3	8	14	23	−9	15 (Note: Lanús defected from the AAF league at the halfway stage, therefore played half as many games as the rest of the league.)
19	Estudiantes (BA)	34	4	5	25	31	90	−59	13

(C) Champions
