= Swimming at the 2010 South American Games – Men's 10 km open water =

The men's 10 km open water event at the 2010 South American Games was held on March 25 at 9:00.

== Medalists ==
Gold	Silver	Bronze
Ivan Alejandro Ochoa; Ecuador	Erwin Maldonado; Venezuela	Damián Blaum; Argentina

== Results ==
Rank	Athlete	Result
1st place, gold medalist(s)	Ivan Alejandro Ochoa (ECU)	1:50:31.5
2nd place, silver medalist(s)	Erwin Maldonado (VEN)	1:50:33.4
3rd place, bronze medalist(s)	Damián Blaum (ARG)	1:50:35.1
4	Allan do Carmo (BRA)	1:50:35.4
5	Guillermo Bertola (ARG)	1:50:36.7
6	Rolando Salas (VEN)	1:50:37.7
7	Filipe Alcantara (BRA)	1:50:45.7
8	Roberto Penailillo (CHI)	1:52:58.2
9	David Céspedes (COL)	2:04:49.7
	Alvaro Pfeifer (CHI)	DNF
	Ricardo Jose Peralta (ECU)	DNF
	Hector Leonardo Bustillo (BOL)	DNS
