= Club Atlético River Plate =

Professional sports club in Buenos Aires, Argentina

River Plate
- Full name: Club Atlético River Plate
- Nicknames: Los Millonarios (The Millionaires); La Banda (The Stripe); El Más Grande (The Greatest); El País menos algunos (The Country except a few)
- Short name: River
- Founded: 25 May 1901; 125 years ago (Note: This was set as the official date of foundation by the club itself, stating that River Plate was established after the merger of clubs La Rosales and Santa Rosa. Nevertheless, other sources say that the real date of foundation is 15 May 1904 as River Plate would have assumed the date of foundation of predecessor club La Rosales as their own birth. This version is supported by historians whom found evidence of recorded matches played by both, La Rosales and Santa Rosa, after 1901. Moreover, La Nación newspaper published an article on 22 May 1904 about the "recent foundation" of River Plate.)
- Ground: Estadio Monumental
- Capacity: 85,018
- Chairman: Stéfano Di Carlo
- Manager: Pablo Longoria
- Coach: Leonardo Ponzio
- League: Liga Profesional
- 2025: 4th of 30
- Website: riverplate.com
| Home colours | Away colours | Third colours |

Club Atlético River Plate (CARP) (Spanish pronunciation: [ˈkluβ aˈtletiko ˈriβer ˈpleit]) is an Argentine professional sports club based in the Belgrano neighborhood of Buenos Aires. Founded in 1901, the club is named after the English-language name for the city's estuary, Río de la Plata. River's home stadium, the Monumental, is the largest in South America. River had the highest average home attendance of any association football club in the world in 2023 with 84,567. With more than 350,000 members at the end of 2023, River is one of the largest sports clubs by membership. It repeated this achievement in 2024 and 2025. With 72 official titles to date, River Plate is one of the most successful clubs among Argentina’s traditional Big Five of Argentine football.

Although a multi-sport club, River Plate is best known for its professional association football department, which has won Argentina's Primera División championship a record 38 times, most recently in 2023. River Plate have also won 16 national cups, making River Argentina's most successful team in domestic competitions with 54 titles in total. At international level, River have won 18 titles, including four Copa Libertadores, one Intercontinental Cup, one Supercopa Sudamericana, one Copa Sudamericana, three Recopa Sudamericanas, one Copa Interamericana, one Suruga Bank Championship, a record five Copa Aldaos, and one Tie Cup. In addition, River Plate's reserve team won the U-20 Copa Libertadores in 2012. After winning the 2014 Copa Sudamericana, 2015 Recopa Sudamericana and the 2015 Copa Libertadores, River Plate became the first team to simultaneously hold CONMEBOL's three current major international competitions.

River Plate are ranked first in the all-time Argentine Primera División table, having gained the most points, having played the most matches, and having the highest win percentage. River are also ranked first in the historical table of the Copa Libertadores, being the South American team with most games won and the most points gained. The club were placed ninth in the FIFA Club of the Century poll in 2000. In a survey published by the Argentine Football Association in 2016, 6 out of 11 players of the all-time greatest Argentina national team had played for River Plate.

River have a fierce rivalry with Boca Juniors. Matches between them are known as the Superclásico, and the rivalry is among the most heated in the sport, due to the fixture's global popularity and both clubs having the most fans in Argentina. Notable players who have played for River include José Manuel Moreno, Ángel Labruna, Adolfo Pedernera, Amadeo Carrizo, Alfredo Di Stéfano, Omar Sívori, Norberto Alonso, Daniel Passarella, Enzo Francescoli, Roberto Ayala, Ariel Ortega, Marcelo Salas, Hernán Crespo, Marcelo Gallardo, Pablo Aimar, Javier Saviola, Javier Mascherano, Radamel Falcao, Gonzalo Higuaín and Enzo Fernández.

== History ==
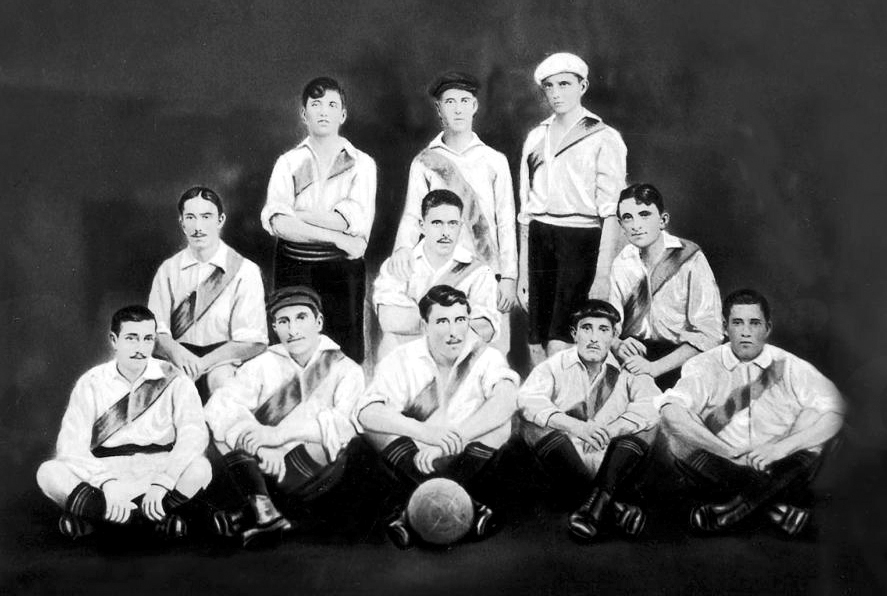
The team that achieved the promotion to first division in 1908.

According with the club's official history, River Plate was founded on 25 May 1901, close to the La Boca neighborhood (later the home of fierce rivals Boca Juniors). They were formed from the merger of two clubs, "Santa Rosa" and "La Rosales", with Leopoldo Bard elected as the first president. The name River Plate was chosen because of an incident during the construction of Buenos Aires Port: one of the members had seen how the workers of Dique nº 3 left their duties for a while to play a football match. The boxes they were working with just said "The River Plate" (the name the English gave to the Río de la Plata) and that inscription was taken to name the new club.

River Plate affiliated to the Argentine Football Association in 1905, debuting in the third division against Facultad de Medicina. On 13 December 1908, the team was promoted to first division after beating Racing Club 2–1. However, the match was declared null due to River supporters jumping onto the field to celebrate with the players, so a new match had to be played. River again won, this time 7–0, to achieve promotion.

In 1914 River won its first domestic championship, the Copa de Competencia Jockey Club and its first international title, the Copa de Competencia Chevallier Boutell. The nickname Los Millonarios came after the acquisition of winger Carlos Peucelle in 1931 for $10,000 and Bernabé Ferreyra for $35,000 (a large sum of money for the period) in 1932.

In the following years, River Plate consolidated its place as one of the most popular teams of Argentina, and the 20th century brought much success. The club's record of 28 official tournaments saw them dubbed El Campeón del Siglo (The Champions of the Century).

== Symbols ==
=== Kit ===
==== Kit evolution ====
| 1901–1904 | 1904–09 (Note: There are different versions about the origin of the red band; some state that it was first worn during a carnival celebration while other say that River Plate adopted the band to distinguish themselves from a team of Villa Devoto that also had white jerseys.) | 1909–1932 (Note: This jersey, worn as the home kit until 1932, has remained (with few exceptions) as the away kit) | 1932–present (Note: In March 1932, president of the club, Antonio Liberti, reissued the red band jersey, after he came to the changing room and said to players: "Take care of it, boys, because this is the River Plate jersey".) |

==== Kit suppliers and shirt sponsors ====
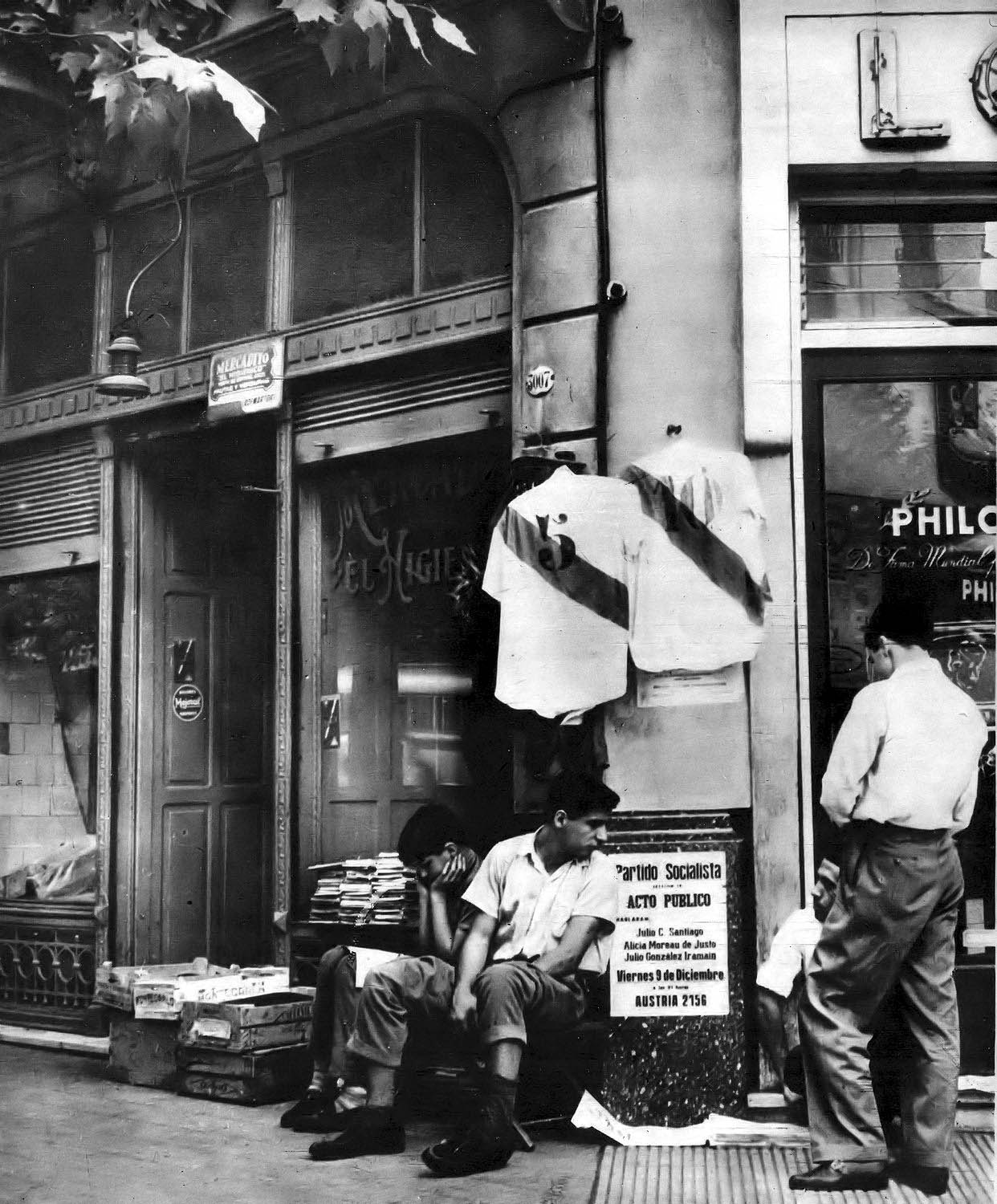
River Plate jerseys exhibited in a corner of the city of Buenos Aires in 1955

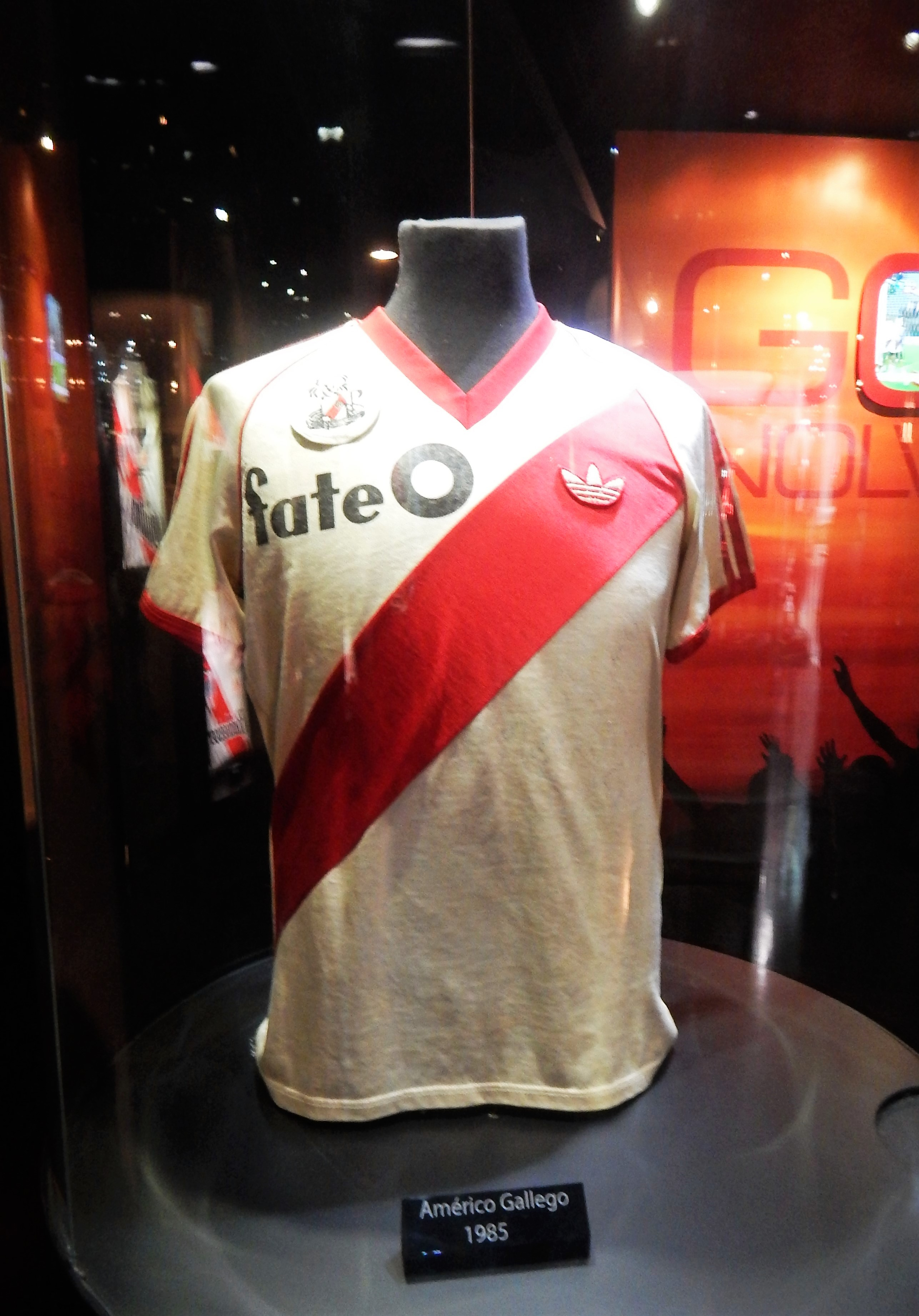
A 1985 Adidas jersey worn by Américo Gallego at the River Plate Museum

Adidas has been River Plate's uniform supplier since 1982, becoming one of the company's largest sponsorship deals in the world, only behind German club Bayern Munich. The US$60 million partnership with the German sports company signed in 2015 (extending the deal to 2021) marked the most expensive kit agreement in the history of Argentine football.

=== Badge ===
The first known logo of River Plate, dated 1914, follows an Art Nouveau style.

As in many football shirts and sports in general, the team's jersey has a badge on its front, as a symbol of the institution. When the River Plate jersey was created it did not have a badge, and its presence varied throughout the history, according to the designs of each era. Currently it is embroidered on the jersey, with three colors (red, white and black). Its format resembles that of the jersey, as it has a red stripe that crosses it, along with the acronym of the club (CARP) in black, and the background is white, in a stylized design.

When Hugo Santilli became chairman in 1984, he soon called to a competition where a new emblem would be chosen. The main objective of this new image was to eradicate the nickname Gallinas (Hens) that River's rivals (Boca Juniors fans mainly) used to mock them. Artists from Argentina took part in that competition. The club finally chose a logo designed by Claudio Loiseau (brother of cartoonist Caloi). This emblem showed the figure of a lion (wearing a River jersey) rising from the Monumental stadium.

We had to get into (lion figures) to avoid replicating symbols such as Plaza Hotel's or Peugeot's. Carlos (Loiseau) contacted designer Ronald Shakespear, who got us a bunch of lion designs... Carlos brought out ideas but he was not a designer but a cartoonist. Once he finished with that, I made the final drawing"

— Claudio Loiseau, designer of the lion emblem.

Once it was approved, the lion logo was added to the uniforms, debuting in 1985. With that emblem on their chests, River Plate won the Copa Libertadores de América and European/South American Cup. In 1989, when Santilli left the club so the lion went with him and has not been reestablished since.

In February 2022, River Plate launched its new corporate image, which included an update to the logo and a typography designed exclusively for the club. The corporate image was created and developed by "Grupo Berro", a branding and design studio that had been working on the corporate image for over two years.

=== Nicknames ===
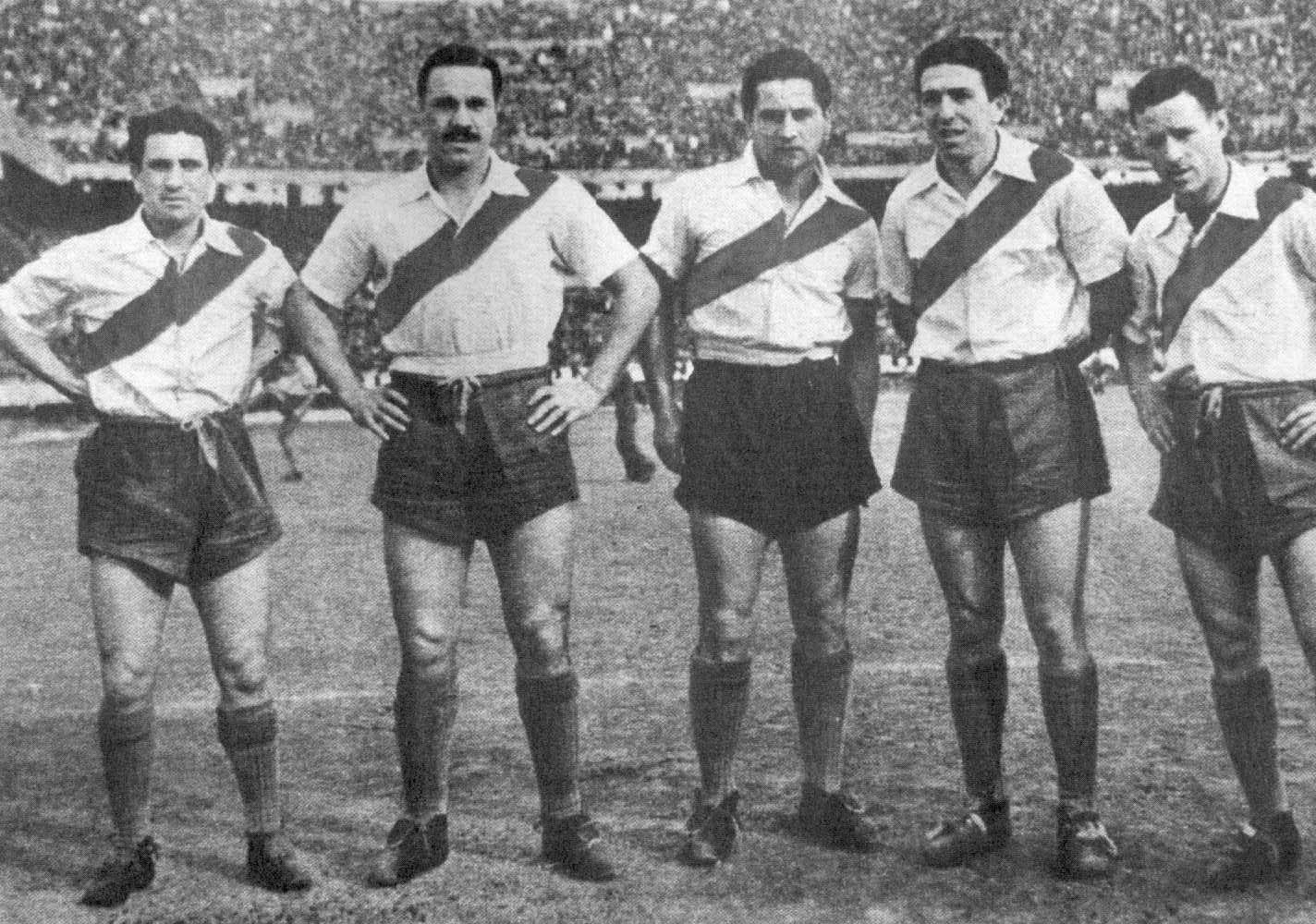
La Máquina in 1941. Fltr: Muñoz, Moreno, Pedernera, Labruna, Loustau

The "River Plate" name was chosen in 1901, when the team was still located at the La Boca neighbourhood, next to the Río de la Plata ("River Plate" in some English sources). Proposed names as "Club Atlético Forward", "Juventud Boquense" or "La Rosales" had been rejected. Pedro Martínez saw the name "The River Plate" written at ship containers, and proposed it as a name, which was finally accepted as the official name.

River fans and the media commonly use the nickname Los Millonarios (The Millionaires) for the club. The name originated from the 1930s following some expensive player transfers from other clubs, including Carlos Peucelle from Sportivo Buenos Aires in 1931 and Bernabé Ferreyra from Tigre in 1932.

Due to the red band in their shirt, it is also common to refer to River as El Equipo de la Banda (the team with the band) or simply La Banda (which means "the stripe", but can also mean "the band" -both as in "gang" and "musical group"). River Plate's forwards between 1941 and 1946 were given the nickname La Máquina (The Machine), due to their synchronization and movements on the field.

There was also a River Plate team that was known as La Maquinita (The Little Machine, as tribute to its predecessor) in the 1950s. Managed by José María Minella, the team earned the nickname after winning five championships in six years (1952–57). Some notable players were Alfredo Di Stéfano, Santiago Vernazza, Walter Gómez, Enrique Omar Sívori, among others. Some members of the original Máquina of the 1940s such as Labruna and Loustau, were also part of the team.

=== Anthem ===
The club's anthem was written in 1918, prior to a Superclásico, by Arturo Antelo—one of River's founders—and was later recorded for the first time in 1932 by Francisco Canaro, set to the melody of the Irish song "It's a Long Way to Tipperary".

Spanish original

Elevemos toda el alma en la humilde canción,
renovando con cariño la ingenua emoción.
Y con lazos triunfaremos
trataremos de unir
el glorioso pasado y el brillante porvenir.

River Plate, tu grato nombre
derrotado o vencedor
siempre cual un solo hombre
nos tendrá a su alrededor.
River Plate, tu grato nombre
derrotado o vencedor
¡Mientras viva tu bandera
la izaremos con honor!

River Plate, en ese nombre
de tan dulce vibración
hay un eco que estremece
y agiganta el corazón.
River Plate, en ese nombre
de tan dulce vibración
¡Mientras viva tu bandera
la izaremos con honor!

River Plate, tu grato nombre
clamaremos con amor.
Nuestra sangre está cruzada
en tu blanco pabellón.

River Plate, tu grato nombre
clamaremos con amor.
¡Mientras viva tu bandera
la izaremos con honor!

English translation

We will raise our whole soul in the humble song,
renewing with affection the innocent emotion.
And with bonds we shall triumph,
we shall strive to unite
the glorious past and the brilliant future.

River Plate, your beloved name,
whether defeated or victorious,
always, united as one,
will have us gathered around you.
River Plate, your beloved name,
whether defeated or victorious.
As long as your flag lives,
we shall raise it with honor!

River Plate, in that name,
of such sweet resonance,
there is an echo that moves us
and makes the heart grow greater.
River Plate, in that name,
of such sweet resonance.
As long as your flag lives,
we shall raise it with honor!

River Plate, your beloved name,
we shall proclaim with love.
Our blood is intertwined
with your white banner.

River Plate, your beloved name,
we shall proclaim with love.
As long as your flag lives,
we shall raise it with honor!

=== Motto ===
The club's current motto is "Vivir y jugar con Grandeza" (Live and play with Greatness), which began to be used in 2021, seeking to renew the club's identity and represent its philosophy.

For much of its history, the club's slogan was "El Más Grande, lejos" ("The Greatest, by far")—the best-known and most widely used slogan for two decades. It was an idea proposed by president Alfredo Davicce (1989-1997). It originated with a massive flag unfurled for the first time by the fans during a Superclásico against Boca in River's home stadium on October 27 1985. Later, "El Más Grande" would become one of the club's nicknames.

== Rivalry ==
River Plate and Boca Juniors are the two largest football clubs in Argentina, with more than half the country's football fans supporting the clubs. Due to the rivalry between them, the Boca Juniors vs River Plate Superclásico local derby match was listed by the BBC as one of the most famous derbies in the world. Attending the match was also acclaimed in 2004 as the number one of the Fifty sporting things you must do before you die by The Observer.

== Stadiums ==
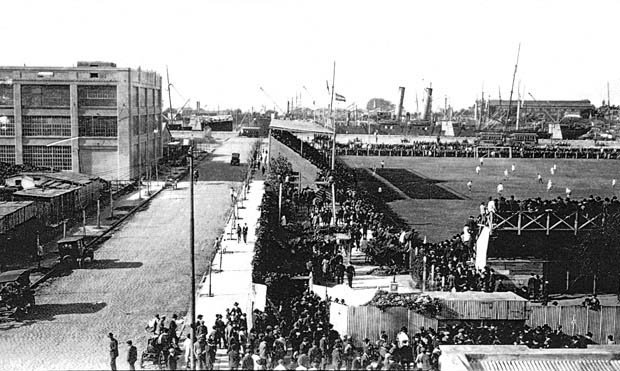
The stadium built by River Plate in La Boca. The club played its home games there from 1915 to 1923.

The Estadio Monumental located in the Belgrano neighborhood of Buenos Aires is River Plate's stadium. It was inaugurated on 25 May 1938, and its current capacity is 85,018 spectators, following renovations completed in 2025. Argentina national football team usually plays its home games at the stadium.

Since its establishment in 1901, River Plate's stadiums have been:

- Dársena Sur (1901–05, 1907–15): Located on the corner of Wenceslao Villafañe and Caboto streets of La Boca. The club returned in 1907 from Sarandí.
- Sarandí (1906–07): The club moved to that district in Greater Buenos Aires, near the railway station.
- La Boca (1915–23): River built a stadium on the corner of Pinzón and Gaboto streets in La Boca.
- Alvear y Tagle (1923–37): Located in the Recoleta district of Buenos Aires. The land where the stadium was built had been owned by Juan Manuel de Rosas.
- Antonio V. Liberti (Monumental) (1938–Present): Built on the same land where the Bajo Belgrano Horse Racing Track had existed years ago.
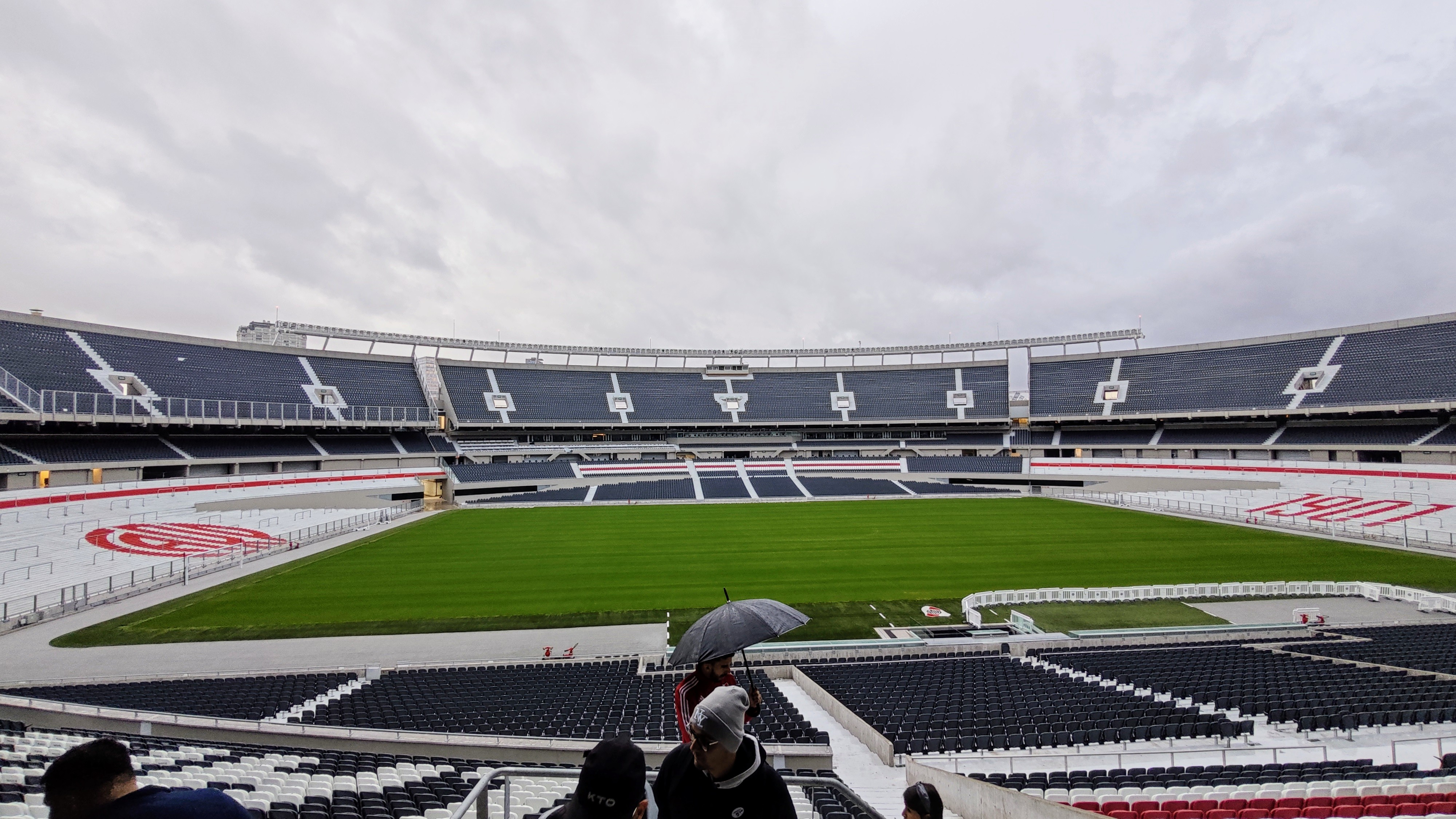
Panoramic view of the Monumental Stadium in 2024.

== Support ==
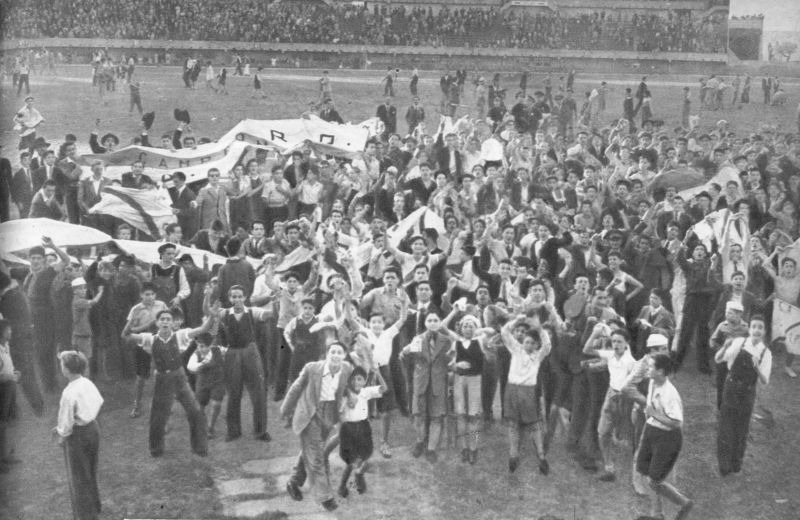
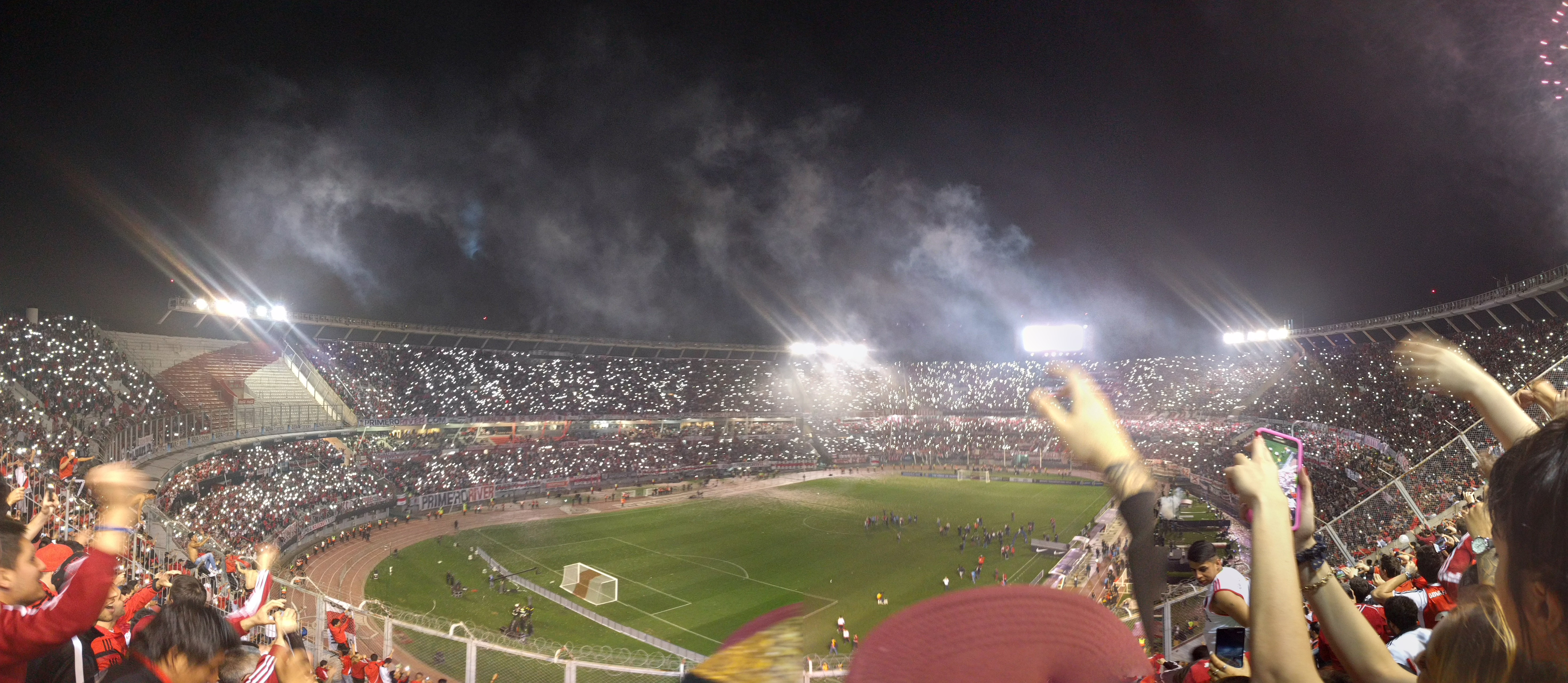
Two images of River Plate supporters: (left): celebrating in the streets in 1945; (right): welcoming the team in the 2015 Recopa Sudamericana

In 2023, River's average home attendance was 84,567, the highest average attendance of any association football club in the world, also having sold-out 48 home matches in a row during the year. It was also reported that River had more than 350,000 members at the end of 2023, making them one of the largest sports clubs by membership.

On 8 October 2012, "The world's longest football flag" was unveiled in a caravan in which approximately 15,000 River supporters took part. It was made entirely by fans who carried the 7,830 meters flag along the streets of Buenos Aires. The away jersey of the 2012–13 season was the most sold throughout the world during the month of September 2012, a first for an Argentine club. In 2015, the club participated in the FIFA Club World Cup and played against Sanfrecce Hiroshima at the Nagai Stadium in Osaka on 16 December, and on 20 December in the final against FC Barcelona at the International Stadium Yokohama. The number of River Plate supporters who traveled to Japan during that period were between 15,000 and 20,000, a record in the competition.

River Plate has official subsidiaries in provinces such as Santa Fe, Tucumán, Córdoba, Entre Ríos, Mendoza, Tierra del Fuego, Catamarca, among others, and in Spain, Mexico, Australia, the United States, Paraguay and Canada. There are also unofficial fan clubs in all Latin American countries, and also in Spain, Italy, England, Israel, Australia, Germany, the United States and New Zealand.

== Players ==
=== Current squad ===
As of 11 August 2026

Note: Flags indicate national team as defined under FIFA eligibility rules; some limited exceptions apply. Players may hold more than one non-FIFA nationality.

| No. | Pos. | Nation | Player |
|---|---|---|---|
| 2 | DF | ARG | Tobías Ramírez |
| 3 | DF | ARG | Francisco Ortega |
| 5 | DF | ARG | Juan Carlos Portillo |
| 6 | MF | ARG | Aníbal Moreno |
| 8 | MF | URU | Mauro Arambarri |
| 9 | FW | ARG | Sebastián Driussi |
| 10 | FW | ARG | Ángel Correa |
| 13 | DF | ARG | Lautaro Rivero |
| 15 | MF | ARG | Fausto Vera (on loan from Atlético Mineiro) |
| 18 | FW | ARG | Lucas Beltrán (on loan from Fiorentina) |
| 19 | FW | COL | Rafael Santos Borré |
| 20 | DF | URU | Giovanni González |
| 21 | DF | ARG | Marcos Acuña |
| 23 | MF | ARG | Thiago Almada |

| No. | Pos. | Nation | Player |
|---|---|---|---|
| 24 | MF | ARG | Juan Cruz Meza |
| 25 | FW | ARG | Lautaro Pereyra |
| 26 | MF | ARG | Tomás Galván |
| 28 | DF | ARG | Lucas Martínez Quarta (vice-Captain) |
| 29 | DF | ARG | Gonzalo Montiel |
| 30 | DF | ARG | Nicolás Otamendi (captain) |
| 31 | DF | ARG | Facundo González |
| 32 | FW | ARG | Agustín Ruberto |
| 33 | GK | ARG | Ezequiel Centurión |
| 41 | GK | ARG | Santiago Beltrán |
| 44 | MF | ARG | Lucas Silva |
| 50 | MF | ARG | Tobías Andrada |
| 57 | GK | ARG | Jeremías Martinet |

=== Other players under contract ===
Note: Flags indicate national team as defined under FIFA eligibility rules; some limited exceptions apply. Players may hold more than one non-FIFA nationality.

| No. | Pos. | Nation | Player |
|---|---|---|---|
| — | GK | ARG | Franco Jaroszewicz |
| — | DF | ARG | Agustín Obregón |

| No. | Pos. | Nation | Player |
|---|---|---|---|
| — | DF | ARG | Lisandro Bajú |
| — | FW | ARG | Alexis González |

=== Reserve squad ===
Note: Flags indicate national team as defined under FIFA eligibility rules; some limited exceptions apply. Players may hold more than one non-FIFA nationality.

| No. | Pos. | Nation | Player |
|---|---|---|---|
| 27 | MF | ARG | Santiago Espíndola |
| 43 | DF | ARG | Valentín Lucero |
| 45 | MF | ARG | Maximiliano Soria |
| 46 | DF | ARG | Lucas Flores |

| No. | Pos. | Nation | Player |
|---|---|---|---|
| 47 | FW | ARG | Tobias Goytia |
| 48 | DF | ARG | Ángel Susano |
| 52 | FW | NGR | Jonathan Spiff |

=== Out on loan ===
Note: Flags indicate national team as defined under FIFA eligibility rules; some limited exceptions apply. Players may hold more than one non-FIFA nationality.

| No. | Pos. | Nation | Player |
|---|---|---|---|
| — | DF | PAR | David Martínez (at Defensa y Justicia until 31 December 2026) |
| — | DF | ARG | Ulises Giménez (at Sarmiento until 31 July 2027) |
| — | DF | ARG | Brian Gutiérrez (at Montevideo City Torque until 31 July 2027) |
| — | DF | ARG | Daniel Zabala (at Huracán until 31 December 2026) |
| — | MF | ARG | Tiago Serrago (at Tigre until 31 December 2026) |
| — | MF | ARG | Leonel Jaime (at Peñarol until 31 December 2027) |
| — | MF | ARG | Juan Sayago (at Flamengo until 31 December 2026) |
| — | MF | ARG | Santiago Lencina (at Burgos until 31 July 2027) |

| No. | Pos. | Nation | Player |
|---|---|---|---|
| — | MF | PAR | Matías Galarza (at Inter Miami until 31 May 2027) |
| — | MF | ARG | Giuliano Galoppo (at Atlanta United until 31 May 2027) |
| — | FW | ARG | Tomás Nasif (at Platense until 31 December 2026) |
| — | FW | ARG | Bautista Dadín (at Aldosivi until 31 December 2026) |
| — | FW | ARG | Maximiliano Salas (at Independiente Rivadavia until 31 July 2027) |
| — | FW | ARG | Ian Subiabre (at Tigre until 31 December 2027) |
| — | FW | ARG | Joaquín Flores (at Central Córdoba until 31 December 2026) |

=== Current coaching staff ===
| Position | Staff |
|---|---|
| Head coach | (Argentina) Leonardo Ponzio |
| Assistant coach | (Argentina) Marcelo Escudero |
| Assistant coach | (Argentina) Christian Manfredi |
| Fitness coach | (Argentina) Cristian Segura |
| Fitness coach | (Argentina) Nicolás Paolorossi |
| Goalkeeping coach | (Argentina) Marcelo Barovero |
| Goalkeeping coach | (Argentina) Alberto Montes |
| Video analyst | (Argentina) Nahuel Hidalgo |
| Video analyst | (Argentina) Alejandro Albornoz |
| Doctor | (Argentina) Fernando Macías |
| Doctor | (Argentina) Christian Verdier |
| Kinesiologist | (Argentina) Jorge Bombicino |
| Kinesiologist | (Argentina) Franco Bombicino |
| Neurosciencist | (Argentina) Sandra Rossi |
| Neurosciencist | (Argentina) Mariela Arangio |
| Nutrionist | (Argentina) Marcelo Pudelka |
| Psychologist | (Argentina) Pablo Nigro |

Last updated: 7 May 2025
Source: Marcelo Gallardo, tras su primera práctica en su regreso a River: cómo quedó conformado su cuerpo técnico

=== Youth academy ===
From its creation in 1901 to the present, the lower divisions of River Plate have protagonized splendid moments in their categories. The River Plate Academy is recognized on a continental and world level for the amount of talents that have emerged throughout it. River produced many of the best players in the history of football, including most of the institution's top idols. Its main objective is to supply players with great future to the first team and educate academically, ethically and athletically its members.
Legends of football not only had the privilege of playing in the first division of the club Millonario, but also wore the red and white jersey since the youth categories. The lower divisions of River Plate, also known as "El Semillero" and the ''River Camp'' has always been the most fruitful of Argentina, the most important and also the one with the greatest success. Historically it is considered as the best soccer training school of the Americas and one of the best in the world.

==== Ballon d'Or winners ====
Two players from the River Plate academy won the Ballon d'Or.

Note: flags indicate national team they played for so the Ballon was awarded to European players only:

- (Spain) Alfredo Di Stéfano (1957, 1959, 1989 Super Ballon d'Or)
- (Italy) Omar Sívori (1961)

==== River players ranked among the 50 best footballers in South America in the 20th century ====
(according to a ranking made by IFFHS); Note: the ranking only includes River Plate players emerged from the youth academy:

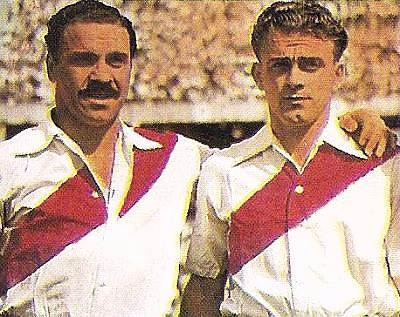
José Manuel Moreno and Alfredo Di Stéfano, ranked among the 50 best South American players of the XX century at the IFFHS website

| Rank. | Player | Votes | Pos. |
|---|---|---|---|
| 3 | (Argentina) Alfredo Di Stéfano | 161 | FW |
| 5 | (Argentina) José Manuel Moreno | 82 | FW |
| 12 | (Argentina) Adolfo Pedernera | 24 | FW |
| 16 | (Argentina) Omar Sívori | 19 | FW |
| 26 | (Argentina) Ángel Labruna | 12 | FW |
| 35 | (Argentina) Daniel Passarella | 8 | DF |

==== Notable players who emerged from the River Plate academy ====
- Pablo Aimar
- Matías Almeyda
- Norberto Alonso
- Julián Alvarez
- Éder Álvarez Balanta
- Eduardo Anzarda
- Leonardo Astrada
- Lucas Boyé
- Claudio Caniggia
- Amadeo Carrizo
- Fernando Cavenaghi
- Hernán Crespo
- Andrés D'Alessandro
- Carlos Daniel Tapia
- Martín Demichelis
- Ramón Díaz
- Alfredo Di Stéfano
- Radamel Falcao
- Enzo Fernández
- Rogelio Funes Mori
- Ramiro Funes Mori
- Marcelo Gallardo
- Gonzalo Higuaín
- Carlos Isola
- Matías Kranevitter
- Juan José López
- Maxi López
- Ángel Labruna
- Manuel Lanzini
- Erik Lamela
- Félix Loustau
- José Manuel Moreno
- Oscar Más
- Javier Mascherano
- Facundo Medina
- Norberto Menéndez
- Reinaldo Merlo
- Gonzalo Montiel
- Carlos Morete
- Mateo Musacchio
- Lucas Ocampos
- Ermindo Onega
- Daniel Onega
- Ariel Ortega
- Joaquín Panichelli
- Exequiel Palacios
- Adolfo Pedernera
- Roberto Pereyra
- Eliseo Prado
- Germán Pezzella
- Guido Rodríguez
- Néstor Rossi
- Alejandro Sabella
- Javier Saviola
- Omar Sívori
- Giuliano Simeone
- Giovanni Simeone
- Santiago Solari
- Pedro Troglio
- Ricardo Vaghi
- Norberto Yácono
- Roberto Zárate

=== FIFA World Cup winners ===
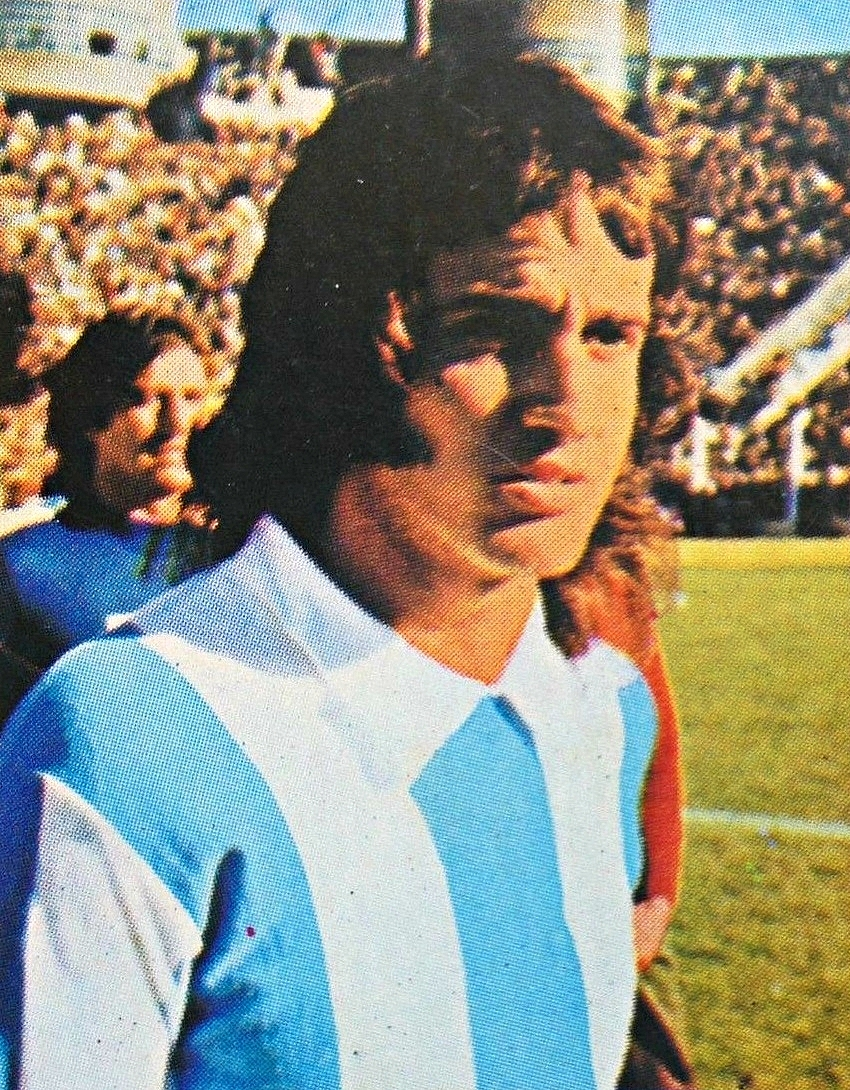
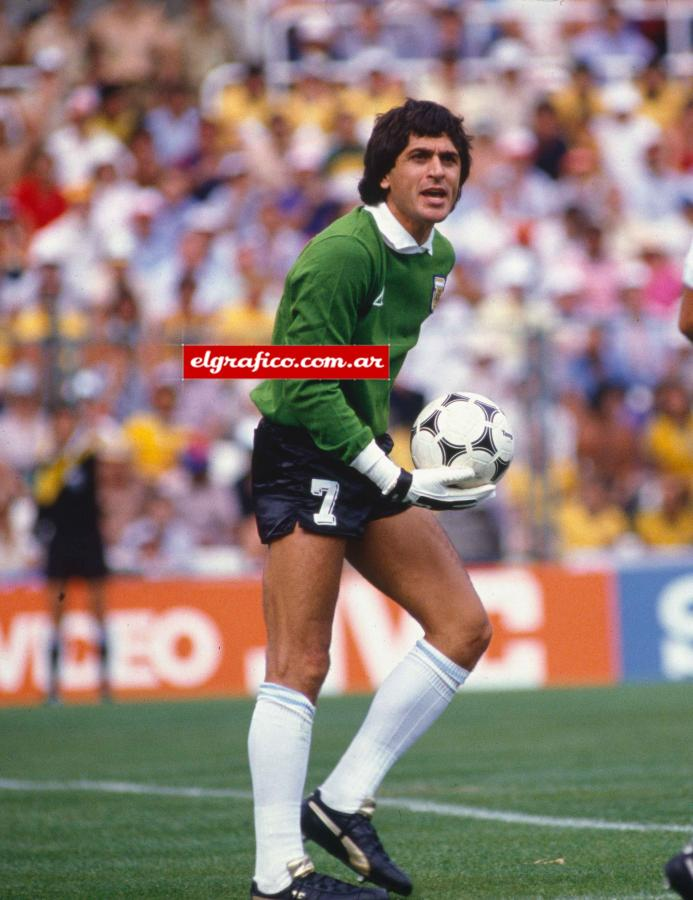
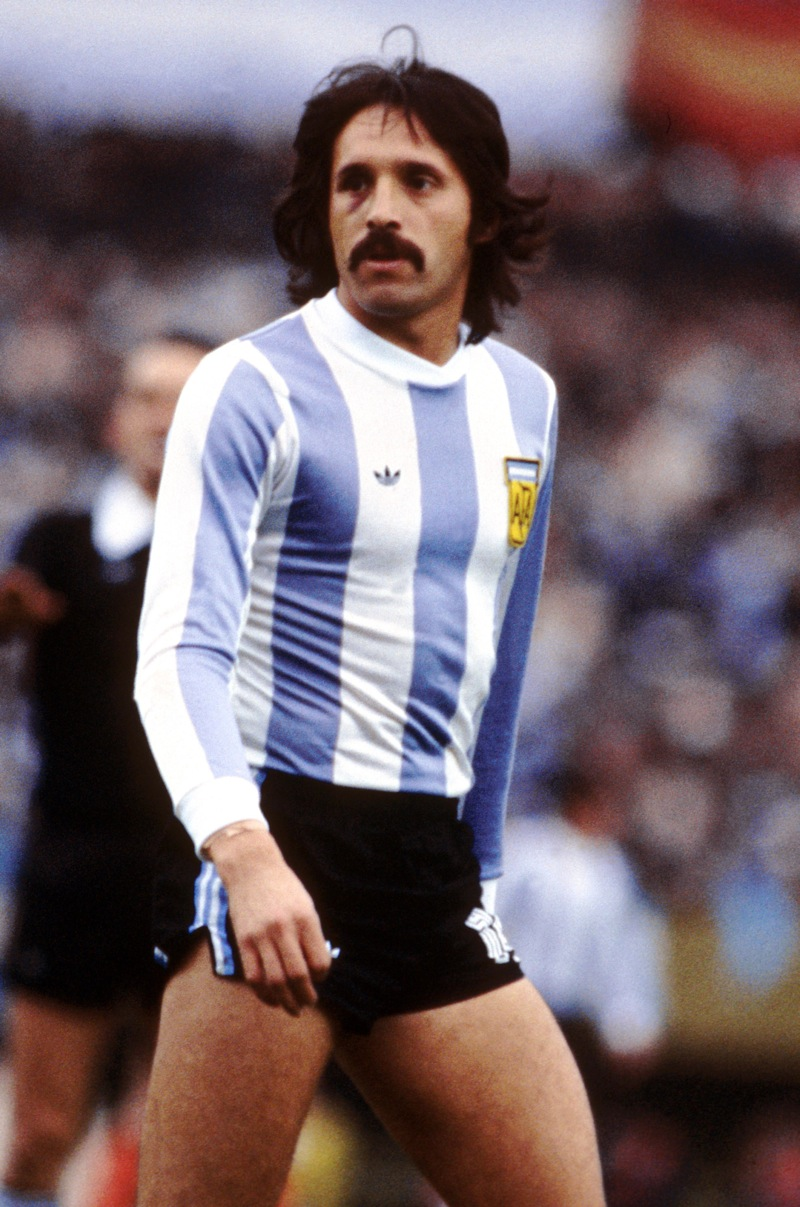
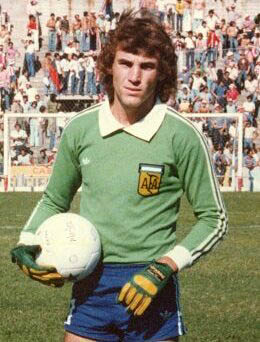
Fltr: Norberto Alonso, Ubaldo Fillol, Leopoldo Luque and Nery Pumpido, some River Plate players that were World Cup winners with Argentina
- Norberto Alonso (1978)
- Ubaldo Fillol (1978)
- Leopoldo Luque (1978)
- Oscar Ortiz (1978)
- Daniel Passarella (Captain 1978, DNP 1986)
- Héctor Enrique (1986)
- Nery Pumpido (1986)
- Oscar Ruggeri (1986)
- Franco Armani (2022)

== Notable managers ==
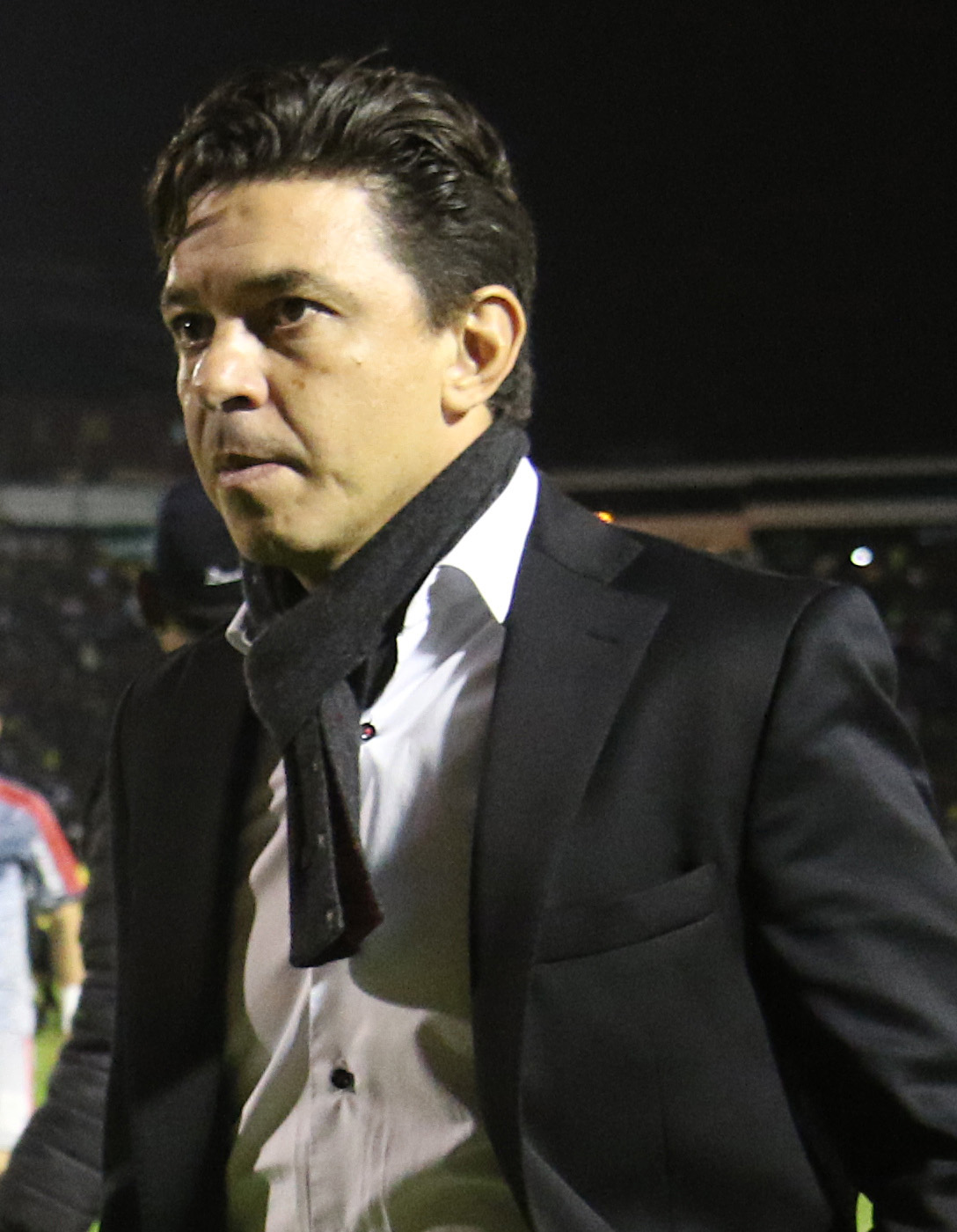
Marcelo Gallardo is the most successful River Plate manager in club's history with 14 titles won

Marcelo Gallardo is the club's most successful manager of all-time, with thirteen titles. Gallardo (appointed in 2014) was the club's manager until November 2022 and under his direction, River Plate won most of its international championships. Domestic titles won include three Copa Argentina (2015–16, 2016–17 and 2018–19) and two Supercopa Argentina (2017, 2019). He has been specially successful in the international scene, having won two Copa Libertadores (2015, 2018), one Copa Sudamericana (2014), three Recopa Sudamericana (2015, 2016, 2019), and one Suruga Bank Championship (2015). Several of these championship wins included memorable victories against archrivals Boca Juniors.

Ramón Díaz had three tenures on River Plate (1995–2000, 2001–02, and 2012–14), being the club's most successful manager in the domestic scene, having achieved six Primera División titles (1996–97 Torneo Apertura, 1996–97 Torneo Clausura, 1997–98 Torneo Apertura, 1999–2000 Torneo Apertura, 2001–02 Torneo Clausura, 2013–14 Torneo Final) and one Copa Campeonato (2014) (Note: The "Superfinal" is considered as a national cup by the Argentine Football Association.); internationally, he won the Copa Libertadores (1996) and one Supercopa Libertadores (1997).

José María Minella was another notable manager with eight titles won with River Plate, seven Primera División championships (1945, 1947, 1952, 1953, 1955, 1956, 1957) and one Copa Dr. Ricardo Aldao (1947).

Ángel Labruna had an outstanding career not only as player (he is club's all-time topscorer with 293 goals in 515 matches played), but as coach for the club, having won six Primera División championships (1975 Torneo Metropolitano, 1975 Torneo Nacional, 1977 Torneo Metropolitano, 1979 Torneo Nacional, 1979 Torneo Metropolitano, and 1980 Torneo Metropolitano).

Héctor Veira won the Copa Libertadores with River Plate, in 1986. That same year the team won the European/South American Cup played in Tokyo. Under his coaching the club also won the 1985–86 Argentine championship, totalizing three titles with River Plate.

== Honours ==
=== Senior titles ===
Keys

- Record
- ^{(s)} Shared record

| Type | Competition | Titles | Winning years |
|---|---|---|---|
| National (League) | Primera División | 38 | 1920 AAm, 1932 LAF, 1936 (Copa Campeonato), 1936 (Copa de Oro) (Note: The 1936 season was divided into two single round-robin tournaments, "Copa Campeonato" (won by River Plate) and "Copa de Honor" (won by San Lorenzo). At the end of the season, both teams played the "Copa de Oro", a single match won by River. In its Memoria y Balance (Annual Report) published by the AFA that year, River Plate is mentioned as "1936 Champion" while San Lorenzo is only mentioned as "Copa de honor winning team". In its 100th anniversary book published in 1993, the AFA listed River Plate as the only 1936 champion. In 2013, the AFA included three 1936 championships on its website, mentioning River Plate as Copa de Oro and Copa Campeonato winner and San Lorenzo as Copa de Honor winner, therefore both clubs added one league title to their honours. Moreover, some historians consider Copa de Oro a national cup instead of a league championship, stating that it was only contested to qualify an Argentine representative to play the Copa Aldao against the Uruguayan champion.) 1937, 1941, 1942, 1945, 1947, 1952, 1953, 1955, 1956, 1957, 1975 Metropolitano, 1975 Nacional, 1977 Metropolitano, 1979 Metropolitano, 1979 Nacional, 1980 Metropolitano, 1981 Nacional, 1985–86, 1989–90, 1991 Apertura, 1993 Apertura, 1994 Apertura, 1996 Apertura, 1997 Clausura, 1997 Apertura, 1999 Apertura, 2000 Clausura, 2002 Clausura, 2003 Clausura, 2004 Clausura, 2008 Clausura, 2014 Final, 2021, 2023 |
| National (Cups) | Copa Argentina | 3 | 2016, 2017, 2019 |
| National (Cups) | Supercopa Argentina | 3 | 2017, 2019, 2023 |
| National (Cups) | Trofeo de Campeones (LPF) | 2^{(s)} | 2021, 2023 |
| National (Cups) | Copa Campeonato | 1^{(s)} | 2014 |
| National (Cups) | Copa Jockey Club | 1 | 1914 |
| National (Cups) | Copa de Competencia (LAF) (Note: Organized by dissident association Liga Argentina de Football) | 1^{(s)} | 1932 |
| National (Cups) | Copa Ibarguren | 4 | 1937, 1941, 1942, 1952 (Note: Title shared ex aequo with Liga Cultural de Santiago del Estero.) |
| National (Cups) | Copa Adrián C. Escobar | 1 | 1941 |
| International | Copa Libertadores (Note: CONMEBOL competition) | 4 | 1986, 1996, 2015, 2018 |
| International | Copa Interamericana (Note: Organised by CONMEBOL and CONCACAF) | 1 | 1986 |
| International | Supercopa Libertadores | 1 | 1997 |
| International | Copa Sudamericana | 1 | 2014 |
| International | Recopa Sudamericana | 3 | 2015, 2016, 2019 |
| International | Suruga Bank Championship (Note: Organised by JFA and CONMEBOL) | 1 | 2015 |
| International | Tie Cup (Note: Organised by AFA and AUF together) | 1 | 1914 |
| International | Copa Aldao | 5 | 1936, 1937, 1941, 1945, 1947 |
| Worldwide | Intercontinental Cup (Note: Organised by UEFA and CONMEBOL together) | 1 | 1986 |

=== Other titles ===
Titles won in lower divisions:

- Primera B Nacional: 2011–12
- Segunda División: 1908

=== Youth titles ===
- U-20 Copa Libertadores (Note: Official u20 title organised by Conmebol.): 2012

=== Friendly titles ===
- Torneo Internacional Nocturno: 1944
- Copa Tres Ciudades: 1947
- Torneo Triangular: 1962
- Copa Ciudad de Bogotá: 1964
- Copa Confraternidad Iberoamericana: 1964
- Feria de Cali: 1965
- Copa Ciudad de Buenos Aires: 1969
- Torneo Villa de Madrid: 1978
- Torneo de Campeones: 1979
- Torneo Cuadrangular Rosa de Oro de Querétaro: 1985
- Copa 85th Aniversario: 1986
- Copa Misiones: 1986
- Copa Trasandina: 1992
- Supercopa Euroamericana (Note: Unofficial trophy contested between Copa Sudamericana and UEFA Europa League winners.): 2015
- Triangular Internacional Sodimac: 2022

== Other sports ==
Apart from football, the club hosts a large variety of sports such as athletics, basque pelota, bowls, chess, basketball, handball, cestoball, gymnastics, field hockey, karate, roller hockey, roller skating, swimming, taekwondo, tennis, volleyball, waterpolo, and eSports.

=== Basketball ===
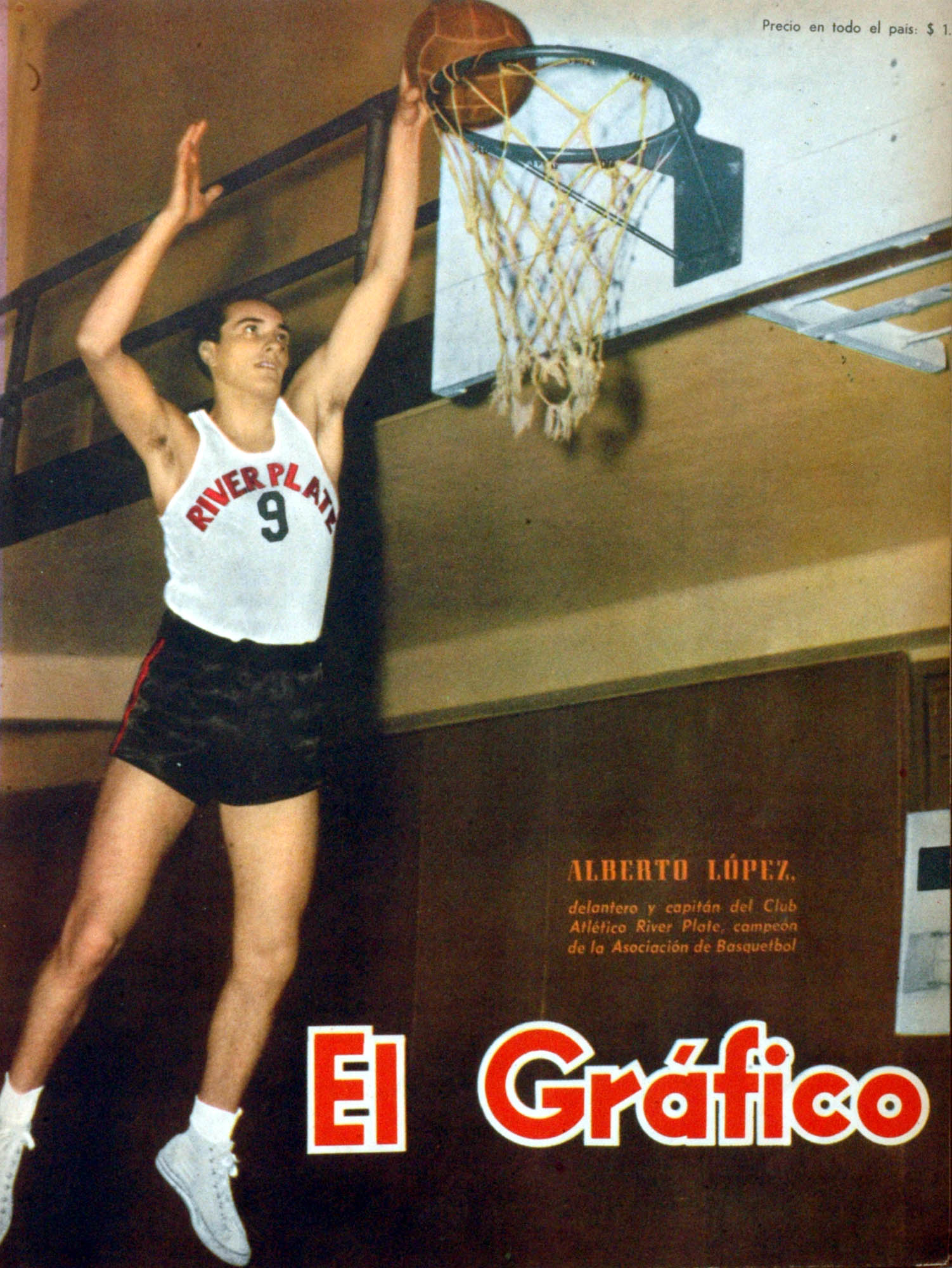
Alberto López won the 1950 World Cup with Argentina

The basketball team currently plays in the Torneo Federal de Básquetbol. In 1950, the first FIBA World Championship was played in Buenos Aires and Argentina claimed the gold medal with 3 River Plate players: Alberto López, Leopoldo Contarbio and Vito Liva. The club won a Campeonato Argentino title in 1983, and finished in the 2nd place in the Campeonato Sudamericano de Clubes Campeones de Básquetbol in 1984.

The last edition of the Campeonato Argentino was held in that year, and River Plate was defeated in the finals, then playing at its successor competition, Liga Nacional de Básquetbol, between 1985–93 and 2004–06. The team reached the finals in 1988, and for the 1989 and 1990 seasons, Héctor Campana became the top scorer of the LNB, playing for River Plate. The team also achieved 2nd place in 2004 and 2005 editions of Copa Argentina. Since 2014, after eight years of absence in professional basketball, River Plate returned to national tournaments playing the CABB Federal Basketball Tournament.

=== Field hockey ===
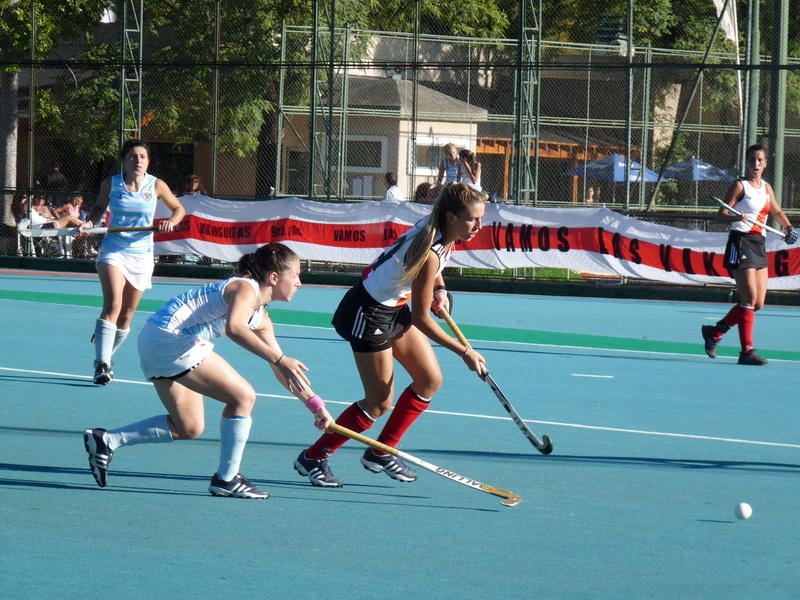
River Plate field hockey team playing Club Ciudad in 2011

The women's field hockey team is affiliated to the Buenos Aires Hockey Association (AHBA) and currently playing in Torneo Metropolitano A, the top division of regional hockey in Argentina.

In 2016, the squad (nicknamed Las Vikingas) won its first Metropolitano championship after beating Ciudad de Buenos Aires by 3–2 at the final.

In 2017, Las Vikingas won their third consecutive Hockey National League after defeating Club Italiano by 2–0 at the final, thus becoming one of the two clubs with most titles at the national tournament.

Two players from River Plate, Lucina von der Heyde and Bianca Donati, who were Junior World Champions in Chile 2016, made their debut in a world cup in London 2018. Von der Heyde was named the FIH Rising Star of the Year.

=== Futsal ===
The futsal team plays in the Argentine División de Honor. The team won three championships in 1991, 2002 and 2003, and two Copa Argentina de Futsal in 2016 and 2017. The team also achieved a third place in the Copa Libertadores de Futsal in 2013.

=== Handball ===
River is one of the founding clubs of the Federación Metropolitana de Balonmano (Fe.Me.Bal.) and it is also the institution that won more championships in local history.

All these titles have been obtained in the metropolitan and national levels, either in Metropolitan, Aperturas, Clausuras, Super 4 or Nacionales Tournaments, or the Federal League. The men's team won 32 domestic titles and the gold medal in the South American Men's Club Handball Championship in 1984. The team also achieved 2 Bronze medals in the same competition and 4 Bronze medals in the Pan American Men's Club Handball Championship. The women's team won 9 national titles, and the silver medal in the South American Women's Club Handball Championship in 1984 and the bronze medal in 1987.

The more prominent players in the club's history are Guillermo Till, Claudio Straffe, Freddy Ambrosini, Gabriel Canzoniero and Juan Ojea.

=== Swimming ===
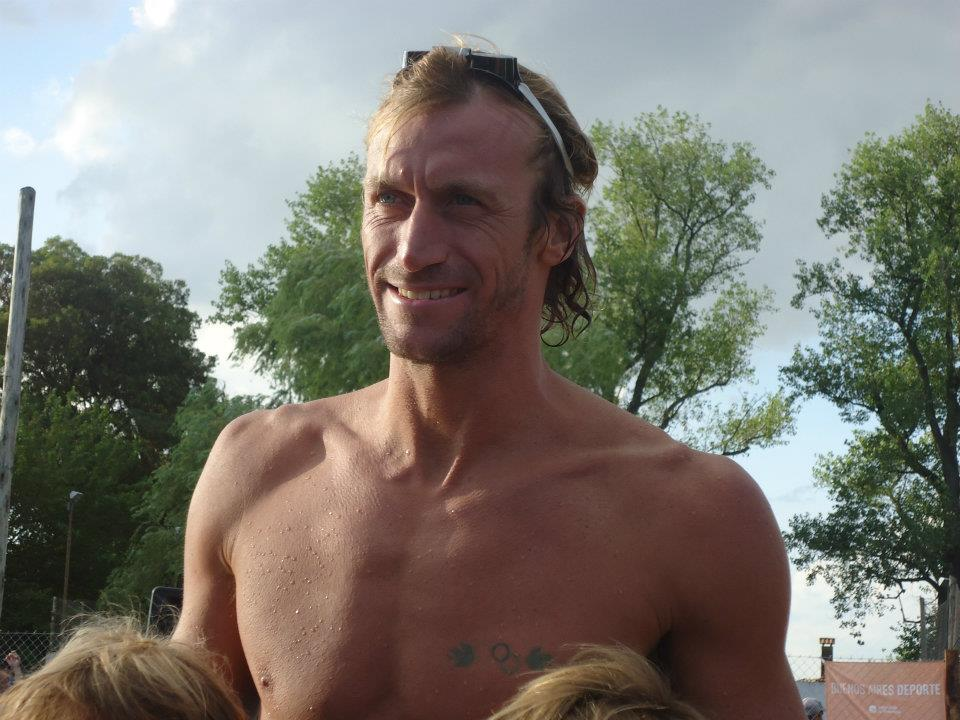
José Meolans competed for River Plate and represented Argentina in four Olympic Games

The current swimming team has its origins in 2003, after many years in which the Club Atlético River Plate had no representatives in the national championships of this discipline.

The draft to form the team was led by Professor Rodolfo Sacco and had the best results that had never been achieved in the institution. The team began to form from a contractual relationship with the swimmer José Meolans, one of the Argentine swimmers with most titles won.

Many high-level swimmers, trained in other institutions began to approach to be part of what would be the best team in the country for the coming years.

Other swimmers from River Plate who represented Argentina in the Olympics include Meolans himself, Georgina Bardach, Eduardo Germán Otero, Walter Arciprete, Agustín Fiorilli, María del Pilar Pereyra, Juan Pereyra, Damián Blaum, Javiera Salcedo, Pablo Martín Abal, Cecilia Biagioli.

=== Tennis ===
Tennis has been played at River Plate since 1923. The facilities at River include ten clay courts and one hard court. The club fields many teams in official tournaments organized by the Asociación Argentina de Tenis (AAT), and hosts competitions and programs aimed at developing tennis in Argentina.

Gabriela Sabatini, who is considered the best Argentine women's tennis player in history and an icon in national women's sport, began practicing at River at age 6, under the direction of Professor Daniel Fidalgo, with whom she trained for seven years. When she was 12 years old, she participated in the Mundialito Infantil de Caracas, winning the competition, and ratifying once again the talent she had already shown during her participation in metropolitan and national children's tournaments.

=== Volleyball ===
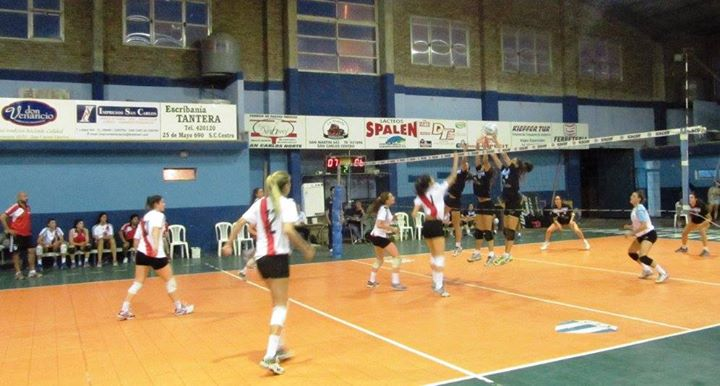
Women's volleyball at River Plate

River Plate Women's division reached the national title four times, being one of the top champions of the league and the first to be champion three consecutive times (2005 to 2007).

The men's volleyball team won the Liga Argentina de Voleibol in the 1998–99 season with the Brazilians Jefferson, Marcos Dreyer, and the nationals Marcelo Román, Diego Gutiérrez and Luis Gálvez and the Súper 4 in 2003. The team also won 8 Metropolitan Leagues between 1956 and 2011.

=== Women's Football ===
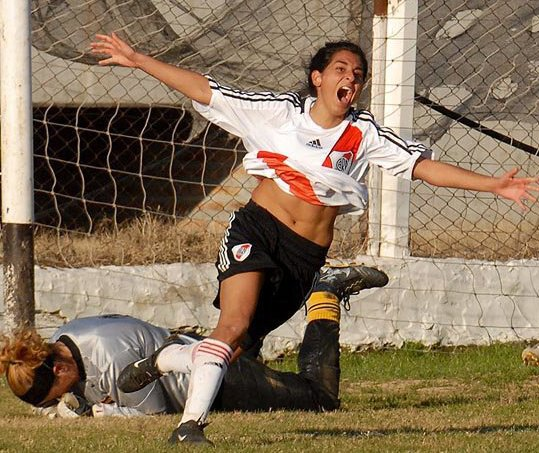
María Pía Gomez scoring a goal for the women's team in 2011

The River Plate women's football team plays in the Campeonato de Fútbol Femenino and have won the championship 11 times of which five were in succession from 1993 to 1997. The team achieved the third place in the 2017 Copa Libertadores Femenina.

=== Other ===
In addition to the mentioned sports, River Plate's sections include artistic gymnastics, artistic roller skating, athletics, basque pelota, boxing, bowls, chess, karate, rhythmic gymnastics, roller hockey, taekwondo, table tennis and waterpolo.

== See also ==
- List of world champion football clubs
