= Swimming at the 2010 South American Games – Men's 5 km open water =

The men's 5 km open water event at the 2010 South American Games was held on March 23, 2010 at 10:00.

== Medalists ==
Gold	Silver	Bronze
Ivan Alejandro Ochoa; Ecuador	Allan do Carmo; Brazil	Damián Blaum; Argentina; Erwin Maldonado; Venezuela

== Results ==
Rank	Athlete	Result
1st place, gold medalist(s)	Ivan Alejandro Ochoa (ECU)	57:12.3
2nd place, silver medalist(s)	Allan do Carmo (BRA)	57:14.3
3rd place, bronze medalist(s)	Damián Blaum (ARG)	57:16.4
3rd place, bronze medalist(s)	Erwin Maldonado (VEN)	57:16.4
5	Gabriel Villagoiz (ARG)	57:16.7
6	Filipe Alcantara (BRA)	57:19.7
7	Rolando Salas (VEN)	58:19.1
8	Roberto Penailillo (CHI)	58:31.0
9	Miguel Peñaloza (COL)	59:43.2
10	Alvaro Pfeifer (CHI)	1:02:08.6
11	Ricardo Jose Peralta (ECU)	1:03:10.6
12	David Céspedes (COL)	1:03:30.9
13	Hector Leonardo Bustillo (BOL)	1:22:44.9
