= Diogo Villarinho =

Brazilian swimmer (born 1994)

Personal information
- Full name: Diogo Villarinho
- Born: 11 March 1994 (age 32) Goiânia, Goiás, Brazil

Sport
- Sport: Swimming
- Strokes: Freestyle
- Club: Minas Tênis Clube
Medal record
World Championships
Silver medal – second place	2015 Kazan	Team
South American Games
Gold medal – first place	2014 Santiago	Team

Diogo Villarinho (born 11 March 1994) is a Brazilian swimmer, who specialized in open water marathon.

== Career ==
At the 2013 World Aquatics Championships, in Barcelona, he finished 15th in the Men's 25 km, and 52nd in the Men's 10 km race.

At the 2014 South American Games, in Santiago, he won a gold medal in the Team's 3 km, and finished 4th in the Men's 10km.

At the 2015 FINA World Championships in Kazan, he finished 21st in the 10 km marathon. Three days later, he won the silver medal in the Mixed 5km Team Event. On August 1, he finished 18th in the 25 km marathon.

At the 2019 World Aquatics Championships in Gwangju, South Korea, he finished 4th in the Open water swimming Team, 36th in the Men's 5 km marathon, and 22nd in the Men's 1500 metre freestyle.

At the 2019 Pan American Games held in Lima, Peru, he finished 6th in the Men's 800 metre freestyle and in the Men's 1500 metre freestyle.
