= Swimming at the 2014 South American Games – Men's 10 km open water =

Men's 10 km open water swimming at the 2014 South American Games
- Dates: March 16, 2014
- Competitors: 12 from 8 nations
- Winning time: 1:56:43

Medalists
| gold medal | Allan do Carmo | Brazil |
| silver medal | Diego Vera | Venezuela |
| bronze medal | Santiago Enderica | Ecuador |

The men's 10 km open water swim competition at the 2014 South American Games took place on March 16 at the C.A.R. Laguna Curauma.

== Results ==
The race was started at 10:00.

| Rank | Swimmer | Nationality | Time |
|---|---|---|---|
| 1st place, gold medalist(s) | Allan do Carmo | Brazil | 1:56:43 |
| 2nd place, silver medalist(s) | Diego Vera | Venezuela | 1:56:45 |
| 3rd place, bronze medalist(s) | Santiago Enderica | Ecuador | 1:56:50 |
| 4 | Diogo Villarinho | Brazil | 1:56:51 |
| 5 | Guillermo Bertola | Argentina | 1:56:53 |
| 6 | Luis Bolaños | Venezuela | 1:56:54 |
| 7 | Esteban Enderica | Ecuador | 1:57:00 |
| 8 | Miguel Tapia Salinas | Chile | 1:59:06 |
| 9 | Vicente Kubierschky | Chile | 2:03:15 |
| 10 | Nicolas Magnani | Uruguay | 2:10:02 |
| 11 | Walter Quilla | Bolivia | 2:16:56 |
| 12 | Jean Aragon | Peru | DNF |
