= Swimming at the 2014 South American Games – Team 3 km open water =

Team 3 km open water swim at the 2014 South American Games
- Dates: March 17, 2014
- Winning time: 34:05:29

Medalists
gold medal	Allan do Carmo, Ana Marcela Cunha and Diogo Villarinho	Brazil
silver medal	Esteban Enderica, Santiago Enderica and Samantha Arevalo	Ecuador
bronze medal	Miguel Tapia Salinas, Vicente Kubierschky and Kristel Köbrich	Chile

The team 3 km open water swim competition at the 2014 South American Games took place on March 17 at the C.A.R. Laguna Curauma.

== Results ==
The race was started at 10:00.

Rank	Swimmer	Nationality	Time
1st place, gold medalist(s)	Allan do Carmo; Ana Marcela Cunha; Diogo Villarinho	Brazil	34:05:29
2nd place, silver medalist(s)	Esteban Enderica; Santiago Enderica; Samantha Arevalo	Ecuador	34:44:24
3rd place, bronze medalist(s)	Miguel Tapia Salinas; Vicente Kubierschky; Kristel Köbrich	Chile	34:54:93
4	Guillermo Bertola; Martín Yunges; Cecilia Biagioli	Argentina	35:04:70
5	Diego Vera; Liliana Hernandez; Luis Bolaños	Venezuela	36:08:81
