= Allan do Carmo =

Brazilian swimmer (born 1989)

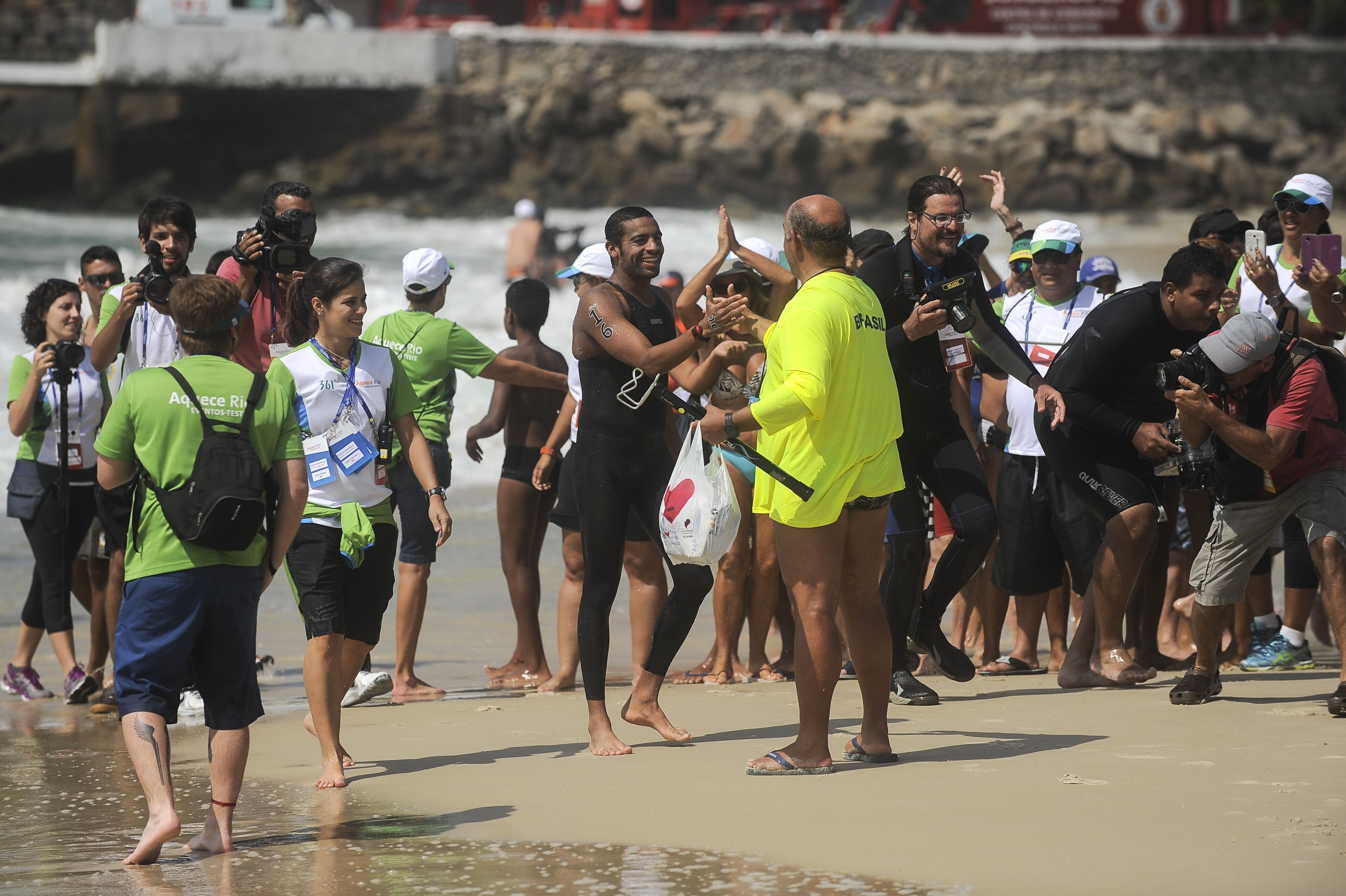

Personal information
- Full name: Allan Lopes Mamédio do Carmo
- National team: Brazil
- Born: 3 August 1989 (age 37) Salvador, Bahia, Brazil
- Height: 1.68 m (5 ft 6 in)
- Weight: 60 kg (132 lb)

Sport
- Sport: Swimming
- Strokes: Open water marathon
Medal record
Men's swimming
Representing Brazil
World Championships
| Silver medal – second place | 2015 Kazan | Team |
| Bronze medal – third place | 2013 Barcelona | Team |
Pan American Games
| Bronze medal – third place | 2007 Rio de Janeiro | 10 km marathon |
South American Games
| Gold medal – first place | 2006 Buenos Aires | 5 km marathon |
| Gold medal – first place | 2014 Santiago | 10 km marathon |
| Gold medal – first place | 2014 Santiago | 3 km team |
| Silver medal – second place | 2010 Medellín | 5 km marathon |
- Updated on 30 July 2015

Allan Lopes Mamédio do Carmo (born 3 August 1989) is a Brazilian swimmer, who specialized in open water marathon. He is considered one of the fastest professional open water swimmers in the world, finishing near the top of FINA World Cup races for the 10 km marathon. He also won a bronze medal for his category at the 2007 Pan American Games in Rio de Janeiro.

== Career ==
Do Carmo qualified for the 2008 Summer Olympics in Beijing, after placing sixth in the 10 km Marathon Swimming Olympic test event at Shunyi Olympic Rowing-Canoeing Park. He swam in the first-ever Olympic men's 10 km open water marathon, against a field of 24 other competitors, including former pool swimmers Petar Stoychev of Bulgaria and Thomas Lurz of Germany. Do Carmo finished the race in fourteenth place, with a time of 1:52:16.6, approximately twenty-five seconds behind winner Maarten van der Weijden of the Netherlands.

In 2010, do Carmo narrowly missed out of the medal podium, when he finished fourth for the 10 km open water marathon at the Pan Pacific Championships in Long Beach, California, United States, with a time of 1:56:04.67, two minutes behind Canada's Richard Weinberger. On that same year, do Carmo claimed a silver medal in the 5 km, but achieved again a fourth-place finish in the 10 km at the South American Games in Medellín. He also finished 4th in the 10 km marathon.

At the 2011 FINA World Championships in Shanghai, do Carmo placed fifth in the 25 km marathon, with a time of 5:11:32.2; however, he displayed a poor performance in the 10 km marathon, when he finished the race farther from the medal podium in fiftieth place in 2:05:42.5. Few months later, do Carmo recovered from a major setback with a seventh-place time of 2:08.28 in the 10 km at the Pan American Games in Guadalajara, Mexico.

In 2012, do Carmo offered another shot for a bid to the Summer Olympics in London by participating at the FINA Olympic Marathon Swim Qualifier, held in Setubal, Portugal. He competed against a field of 61 open water swimmers including Stoychev, David Davies of Great Britain, and Oussama Mellouli of Tunisia, who previously won an Olympic gold medal from the pool. Do Carmo, however, failed to qualify for his supposedly second Olympics, after finishing in nineteenth place, with a time of 1:46:38.0.

At the 2013 FINA World Championships in Barcelona, do Carmo finished seventh in the men's 10 km race. Later, in the team event, he won the bronze medal with the Brazilian team, along with Samuel de Bona and Poliana Okimoto. He also swam the 25 km race, finishing 5th, reaching 3 seconds behind the race winner.

At the 2015 FINA World Championships in Kazan, he finished 9th in the 10 km marathon. Three days later, he won the silver medal in the Mixed 5km Team Event. On August 1, he finished 16th in the 25 km marathon.

At the 2016 Summer Olympics, he finished in 18th place in the Men's marathon 10 kilometre.

At the 2017 FINA World Championships in Budapest, he finished 13th in the 25 km marathon and 29th in the 10 km marathon. He also participated at the Mixed 5km Team Event, along with Viviane Jungblut, Ana Marcela Cunha and Fernando Ponte, finishing 6th.

Awards
| Preceded by (Germany) Thomas Lurz | FINA Open Water Swimmer of the Year; 2014 | Succeeded by (United States) Jordan Wilimovsky |
