= Jonathan Spiff =

Nigerian footballer (born 2007)

- Spiff in 2026

Personal information
- Full name: Jonathan Spiff Asuzu
- Date of birth: 23 February 2007 (age 19)
- Place of birth: Buenos Aires, Argentina
- Height: 1.87 m (6 ft 2 in)
- Position: Forward

Team information
- Current team: River Plate
- Number: 52

Youth career
- 2014–: River Plate

Senior career*
Years	Team	Apps	(Gls)
2026–	River Plate	2	(0)

International career
2025	Nigeria U20	0	(0)
- * Club domestic league appearances and goals

Jonathan Spiff Asuzu (born 23 February 2007) is a professional footballer who plays as a forward for Argentine Primera Division club River Plate. Born in Argentina, he was called up to the Nigeria national under-20 team.

== Early life ==
Spiff was born on 23 February 2007 in Buenos Aires, Argentina to a Nigerian Igbo father, who arrived to Argentina in 2006, and an Argentine mother from Entre Ríos.

== Club career ==
=== River Plate ===
In 2014, Spiff joined the lower divisions of River Plate at the age of 7 after passing a test in his first attempt.

In 2024, he scored 19 goals in the Sixth Division and maintained that level in the Fifth, which caught the attention of Marcelo Escudero, who called him up for the first time for a match against Godoy Cruz in 2025.

On 20 May 2026, Spiff made his professional debut for River Plate coming on as a substitute in the 89th minute for right back Ulises Giménez in the 1–1 draw against Red Bull Bragantino at the 2026 Copa Sudamericana.

== International career ==
In 2025, Spiff was called up by the Nigeria U-20 national team for the 2025 FIFA U-20 World Cup, but he did not play any matches.
