= Valentín Lucero =

Argentine footballer (born 2006)

Personal information
- Date of birth: 1 April 2006 (age 20)
- Place of birth: Trenel, La Pampa
- Height: 1.75 m (5 ft 9 in)
- Positions: Left-back; left midfielder; left winger

Team information
- Current team: River Plate
- Number: 43

Youth career
- 2011–2016: All Boys de Trenel
- 2019–: River Plate

Senior career*
Years	Team	Apps	(Gls)
2026–	River Plate	1	(0)
- * Club domestic league appearances and goals

Valentín Lucero (born 1 April 2006) is an Argentine professional association football player who plays as a left-back for Argentine Primera División club River Plate. Lucero can also play as left midfielder or left winger.

== Club career ==
=== Early career ===
Lucero was born in Trenel, and began his youth career at Club Atlético All Boys de Trenel, where he played until 2016. After passing two trials for River Plate, he was added to the club's Ninth Division squad.

=== River Plate ===
He signed his first contract with the club in 2026, committing to the club until December 2027. He was first called up to the first team for the match against Red Bull Bragantino, corresponding to the fifth round of the group stage of the 2026 Copa Sudamericana, played on 20 May 2026. The match ended in a 1–1 draw, and Lucero did not enter the game.

He made his official debut on 2 August 2026, in the 0–1 defeat against Rosario Central, replacing Lautaro Rivero with six minutes remaining.

He made his official debut in an international competition on 19 August, in the 0–0 draw against Independiente Santa Fe in the first leg of the Round of 16 of the 2026 Copa Sudamericana replacing Tobías Andrada.
