= Stéfano Di Carlo =

President of River Plate football club

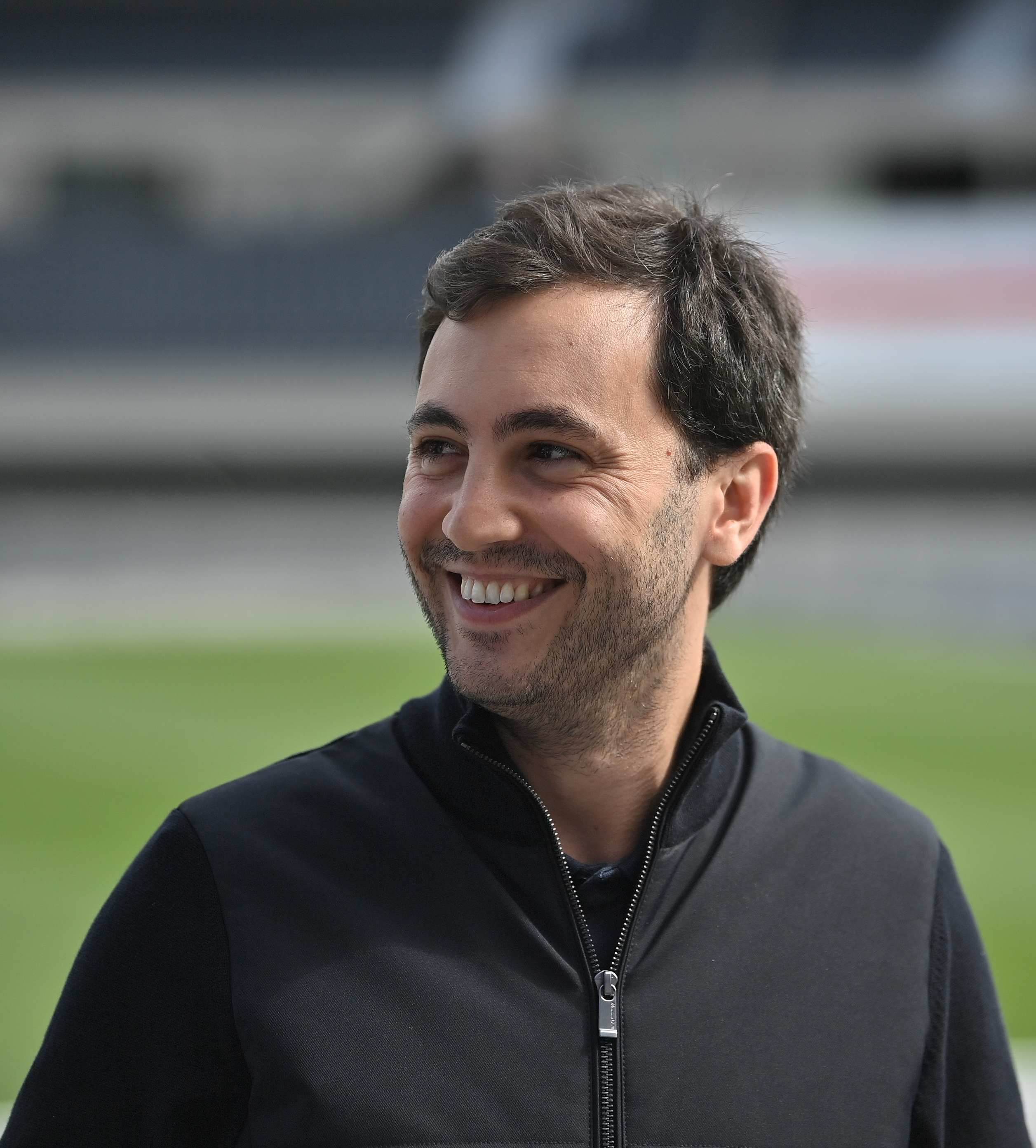
- Born: Stéfano Dante Cozza Di Carlo; 13 May 1989 (age 37); Buenos Aires Province, Argentina
- Occupations: Sports executive, businessman
- Employer: Club Atlético River Plate
- Known for: President of Club Atlético River Plate
Association football career
Team information
- Current team: Club Atlético River Plate (president)
Managerial career
- Years: Team
- 2018–2021: Club Atlético River Plate (second vice president)
- 2025–: Club Atlético River Plate (president)

Stéfano Dante Cozza Di Carlo (born 13 May 1989), is an Argentine sports executive. He is currently the president of Club Atlético River Plate, having won the club’s presidential election as the candidate of the ruling party.

== Biography ==
Di Carlo comes from a family historically linked to River Plate’s leadership. He is the grandson of Osvaldo Di Carlo, who served as club president in 1989 (known for the famous “Di Carlo banner”) and was vice president when River won the 1986 Intercontinental Cup. His great-grandfather, Ángel Di Carlo, was a club executive during the construction and first expansion of the Estadio Monumental.

== Career at River Plate ==
Di Carlo began his involvement in the club’s internal politics in 2013, joining Rodolfo D'Onofrio’s executive team. During that administration, he worked in areas related to communications and education.

In 2018, he was appointed second vice president of River Plate. During his tenure, he promoted the creation of the River ID digital platform, aimed at managing services for club members. Under the presidency of Jorge Brito, he also took part in projects involving the renovation of the Monumental Stadium and the acquisition of new facilities for the club’s youth divisions.

In June 2024, his candidacy for the club’s presidency was officially announced by the current administration. He was elected president on 1 November 2025, winning 61.77% of the vote.

=== Election results ===
==== 2025 ====
Candidate	Party/Group	Votes	%
Stéfano Di Carlo	Filosofía River	15,960	61.77%
Carlos Trillo	River Somos Todos	4,191	16.22%
Luis Belli	River Primero	2,502	9.68%
Daniel Kiper	River Campeón Deportivo y Social	2,141	8.29%
Pablo Lunati	Ficha Limpia en River	1,045	4.04%
Total valid votes			
Null and blank votes			
Registered voters		87,286	
Polling stations			
Total votes cast		25,890	100.00%

== Business activity ==
Outside of sports, Di Carlo is the president and co-founder of Grupo IDIX, a group of companies operating in the technology and communications sectors. Its business lines include firms such as Think Solutions, ATTI, Fan Factory, and Ronda 360, specialising in digital transformation and event management.
