= Damián Blaum =

Argentine swimmer

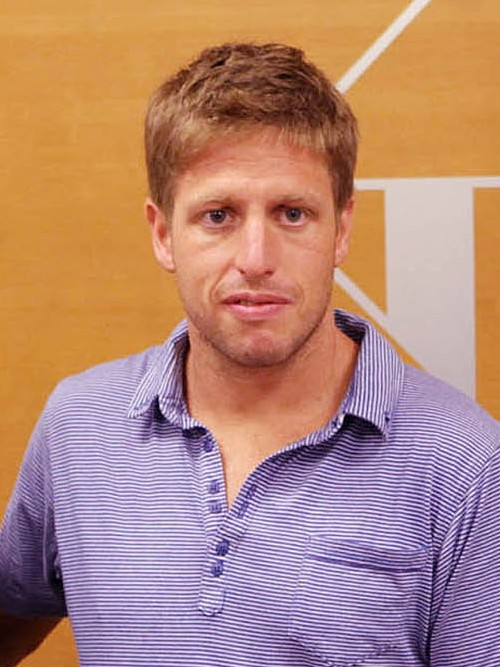

Personal information
- Nationality: Argentina
- Born: 11 June 1981 (age 45) Buenos Aires, Argentina

Sport
- Sport: Swimming
- Strokes: Open Water
- Club: River Plate

Damián Blaum (born 11 June 1981 in Buenos Aires, Argentina) is an Olympic open water swimmer from Argentina. Blaum swam for Argentina at the 2008 Olympics where he finished 21st in the Men's 10K event. He is Jewish.
