= 1909 Tie Cup final =

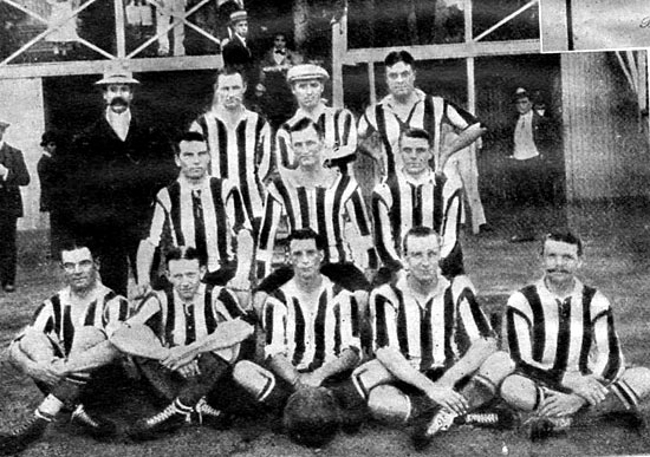
- Team of Alumni, winners
- Event: 1909 Tie Cup
Alumni	CURCC
(Argentina)	(Uruguay)
4	0
- Date: 5 September 1909
- Venue: Estadio GEBA, Buenos Aires
- Referee: Mariano Reyna

The 1909 Tie Cup final was the final match to decide the winner of the Tie Cup, the 10th edition of the international competition organised by the Argentine and Uruguayan Associations together. The final was contested by Argentine Alumni and Uruguayan CURCC.

In the match, played at Estadio GEBA in Palermo, Buenos Aires, Alumni beat CURCC 4–0, with goals by Eliseo Brown (3) and Alfredo Brown, achieving not only its sixth Tie Cup trophy but the record of titles won by any team. It was also the last international title won by the team before Alumni was officially dissolved in April 1913.

== Qualified teams ==
Team	Qualification	Previous final app.
(Argentina) Alumni	1909 Copa de Competencia (A) champions	6 (**1901**, 1902, **1903, 1906, 1907, 1908**)
(Uruguay) CURCC	1909 Copa de Competencia (U) champions	3 (1904, 1905, 1907)

- **Bold** indicates winning years

== Overview ==
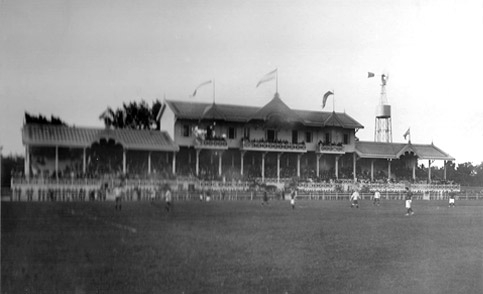
Estadio GEBA, venue of the final

Alumni qualified for the final after having won the Copa de Competencia Jockey Club, where the squad beat Rosarian teams Provincial (4–0) and Rosario Central (3–1 in Colegiales), San Isidro (3–2) and Newell's Old Boys in the final (5–1). The match was held in Gimnasia y Esgrima Stadium in Palermo on 5 September 1905. There was a low attendance due to bad weather.

The rain fallen during almost all the morning prior to the match left the field so muddy that players had problems to control the ball. Even though, Eliseo Brown received the ball 40 meters from the rival goal and started his run. When he was 25 meters from the goal Brown shot for the first goal of Alumni. On 40 minutes, Weiss passed to Arnold Watson Hutton who shot to the goal. Goalkeeper Pintos stopped the shot but the ball rebounded on his hands so Alfredo Brown took advantage of the play to score the second goal. Three minutes later, another pass from Weiss was connected by Eliseo Brown who scored the third goal.

The fourth goal came in the second half, with few minutes left when Eliseo Brown scored the last one for the final 4–0 of Alumni over CURCC. He was also the topscorer of the match with three goals. This edition of the Tie Cup was the last international title won by Alumni. In 1911 the club ceased its participation in official football competitions and two year later it was definitively dissolved.

== Match details ==
1909 Tie Cup Final
5 September 1909
14:20

Alumni (Argentina)	4–0	(Uruguay) CURCC
E. Brown 19', 40', 89'; A. Brown 43'	Report

Estadio G.E.B.A., Buenos Aires
Referee: Mariano Reyna

**Alumni**	**CURCC**

GK	(England) George Scholefield
DF	(Argentina) Jorge Brown
DF	(Argentina) Juan Domingo Brown
MF	(Argentina) Patricio Browne
MF	(Argentina) Ernesto Brown
MF	(Argentina) A. Jacobs
FW	(Argentina) Gottlob Weiss
FW	(Argentina) Alfredo Brown
FW	(Argentina) Arnold Watson Hutton
FW	(Argentina) Eliseo Brown
FW	(Argentina) James Lawrie

GK	(England) Leonard Crossley
DF	(Uruguay) Juan Laguzzi
DF	(Uruguay) Eleuterio Pintos
MF	(Uruguay) Guillermo Manito
MF	(Scotland) (Uruguay) John Harley
MF	(Uruguay) Alfredo Betucci
FW	(Uruguay) José Piendibene
FW	(Uruguay) Felipe Canavessi
FW	(Uruguay) Agustín Manito
FW	(Uruguay) Carlos Scarone
FW	(Uruguay) Pedro Zibechi
