= 1908 Tie Cup final =

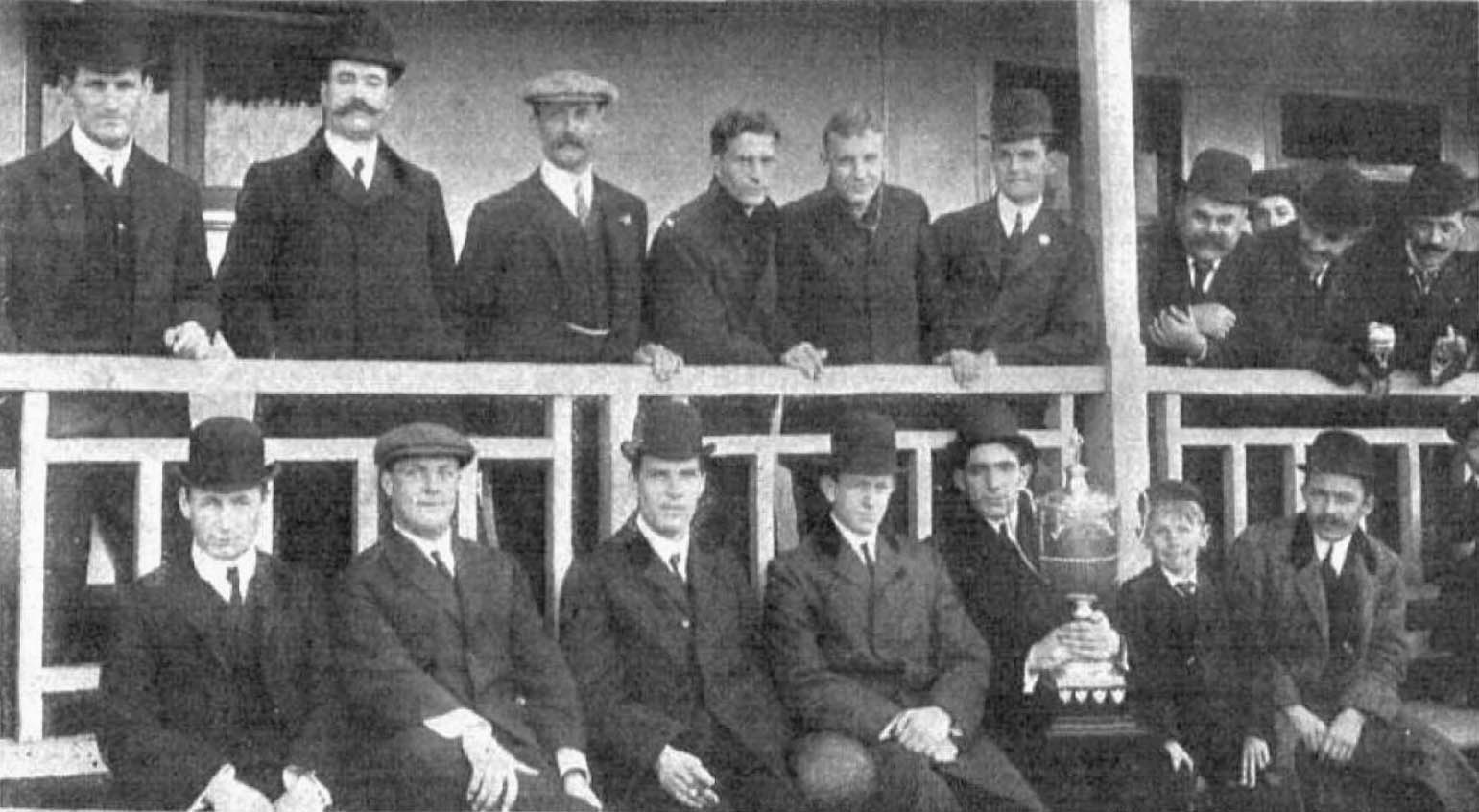
- The Alumni players with the trophy
- Event: 1908 Tie Cup
Alumni	Wanderers
(Argentina)	(Uruguay)
4	0
- Date: 6 September 1908
- Venue: Belgrano A.C., Buenos Aires
- Referee: Guillermo Jordán
- Attendance: 7,000

The 1908 Tie Cup final was the final match to decide the winner of the Tie Cup, the 9th edition of the international competition organised by the Argentine and Uruguayan Associations together. The final was contested by Argentine Alumni and Uruguayan Wanderers, which played its first final.

In the match, played at Belgrano Athletic venue on Superí street in Belgrano, Alumni beat Wanderers 4–0, with three goals by Alfredo Brown, achieving its fifth Tie Cup trophy.

== Qualified teams ==
Team	Qualification	Previous final app.
(Argentina) Alumni	1908 Copa de Competencia (A) champion	5 (**1901**, 1902, **1903, 1906, 1907**)
(Uruguay) Wanderers	1908 Copa de Competencia (U) champion	(none)

- **Bold** indicates winning years

== Overview ==
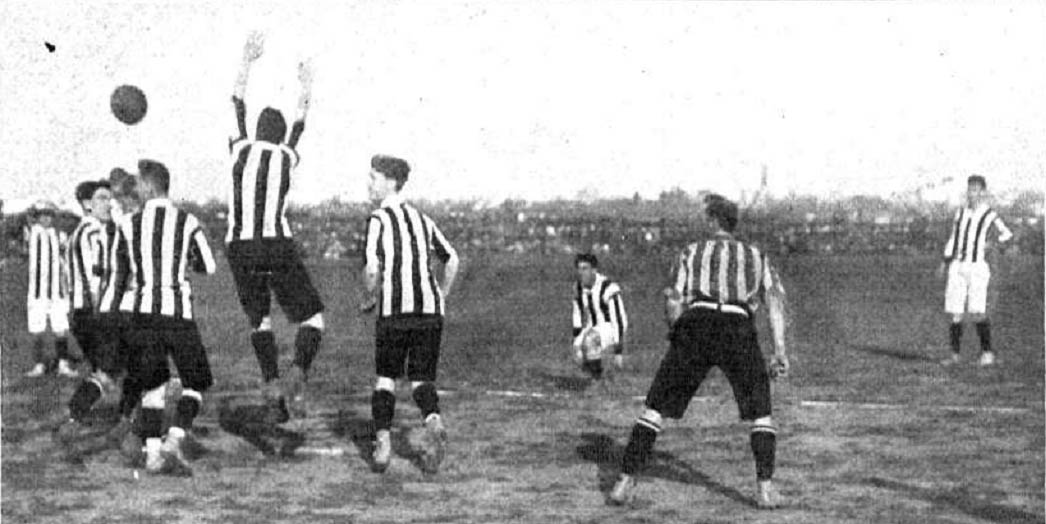
Scene of the match at Belgrano Athletic

Alumni qualified for the final after having won the Copa de Competencia Jockey Club, where the squad defeated San Martín A.C. (3–1), Belgrano (3–0), and Argentino de Quilmes in the final (5–0). The match was held in the Belgrano Athletic venue on Superí and Virrey del Pino streets on 6 September 1908, with an attendance of 7,000.

On 6 minutes, Ernesto Brown drove a corner kick into the penalty area that Bertone turned the ball into Wanderer's own goal. Four minutes later, Alfredo Brown received the ball from a throw-in and after eluding Apesteguy shot to the goal scoring the second goal for Alumni. In the second half, Weiss ran to make a pass to Alfredo Brown who scored his second goal for the 3–0. On 65 minutes, goalkeeper Saporiti hit the ball from a corner kick, but the ball was reached by Alfredo Brown who kicked it with a strong shot that became the fourth goal for Alumni.

== Match details ==
1908 Tie Cup Final
6 September 1908
14:00

Alumni (Argentina)	4–0	(Uruguay) Wanderers
Bertone 6' (o.g.); A. Brown 10', 60', 65'	Report

Belgrano A.C., Buenos Aires
Attendance: 7,000
Referee: Guillermo Jordán

**Alumni**	**Wanderers**

GK	(Argentina) J. Murphy
DF	(Argentina) Jorge Brown
DF	(Argentina) Juan Domingo Brown
MF	(Argentina) Patricio Browne
MF	(Argentina) Walter Buchanan
MF	(Argentina) Ernesto Brown
FW	(Argentina) Gottlob Weiss
FW	(Argentina) Alfredo Brown
FW	(Argentina) Arnold Watson Hutton
FW	(Argentina) Eliseo Brown
FW	(Argentina) James Lawrie

GK	(Uruguay) C. Saporiti
DF	(Uruguay) M. Apesteguy
DF	(Uruguay) J. C. Bertone
MF	(Uruguay) L. Piñeyro Carve
MF	(Uruguay) F. Branda
MF	(Uruguay) A. Parravicini
FW	(Uruguay) J. Raymonda
FW	(Uruguay) D. Rebagliatti
FW	(Uruguay) H. Gallinal
FW	(Uruguay) A. Zumarán
FW	(Uruguay) R. Marquisio
