= 1910 Tie Cup final =

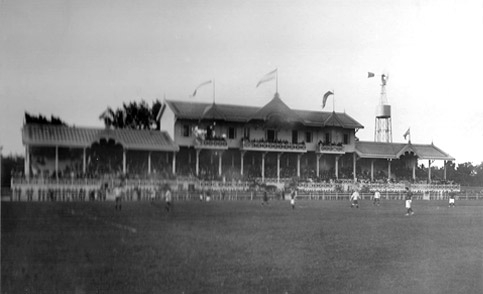
- Estadio GEBA, venue of the final
- Event: 1910 Tie Cup
Estudiantes BA	CURCC
(Argentina)	(Uruguay)
2	2
- The playoff was never played so no champion was crowned
- Date: 7 August 1910
- Venue: Estadio GEBA, Buenos Aires
- Referee: Héctor Alfano

The 1910 Tie Cup final was the final match to decide the winner of the Tie Cup, the 11th edition of the international competition organised by the Argentine and Uruguayan Football Associations. The final was contested by Argentine C.A. Estudiantes and Uruguayan CURCC. It was the last Tie Cup played by the CURCC before the club dissolved in 1915. (Note: The date of dissolution refers to CURCC as a "cricket" institution, due to some versions state the football section had separated from the club in 1913 while others say football became active in CURCC until its dissolution.)

In the match, played at Estadio GEBA in Palermo, Buenos Aires, the teams tied 2–2 so a playoff needed to be played to determine a winner. The rematch was never scheduled, so the trophy was declared desert in 1911.

== Qualified teams ==
Team	Qualification	Previous final app.
(Argentina) Estudiantes BA	1910 Copa Competencia (A) champion	(none)
(Uruguay) CURCC	1910 Copa Competencia (U) champion	4 (1904, 1905, 1907, 1909)

- **Bold** indicates winning years

== Overview ==
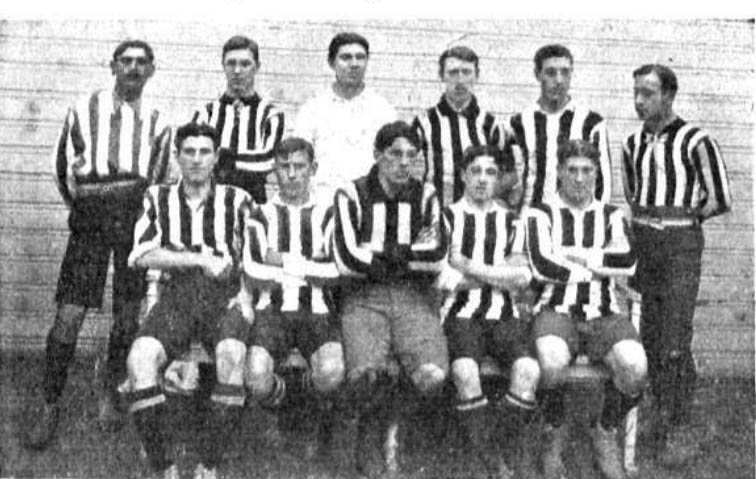
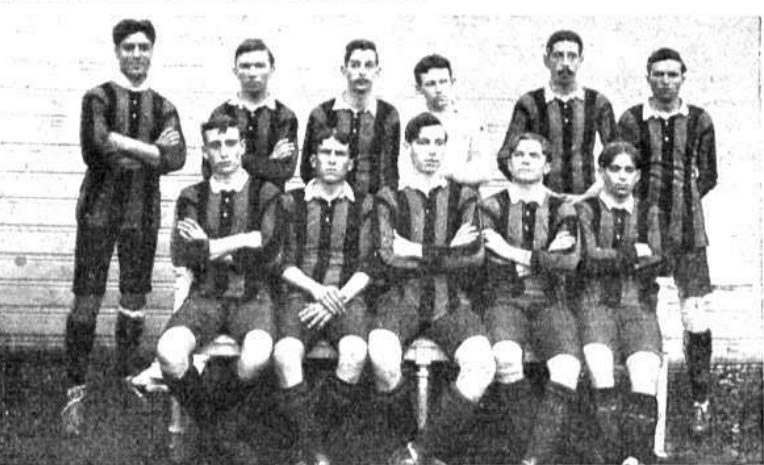
Teams of Estudiantes (left) and CURCC posing before the match

Estudiantes earned its place in the final after having won the 1910 Copa de Competencia Jockey Club, where the squad beat Argentino de Rosario (1–0 in Palermo), Newell's Old Boys (3–3, 4–3 in Palermo and Rosario respectively), and Gimnasia y Esgrima in the final (3–1 at Ferro C. Oeste). The match was held in Gimnasia y Esgrima Stadium in Palermo (which had been completely refurbished for the Copa Centenario Revolución de Mayo) on 7 August 1910.

Estudiantes took advantage with only 5 seconds played, when forward Maximiliano Susán scored the first goal. The same player scorded again on 5', to put Estudiantes 2–0 over CURCC. Pedro Zibecchi scored a goal for the visitors to make the score 2–1. In the second half, CURCC forced a draw on 12' after a free kick by Zibecchi.

As strong rain fell during the match, referee Héctor Alfano agreed with both captains to suspend the game on 61 minutes. With the 2–2 result, a playoff was scheduled for August 21 to determine a champion. However, the break up between both associations, AFA and AUF, after the 1910 Copa Lipton match held on August 15, meant that the playoff was not carried out. In April 1911 the Cup was officially declared desert with no champion crowned.

== Match details ==
1910 Tie Cup Final
7 August 1910
14:20

Estudiantes BA (Argentina)	2–2	(Uruguay) CURCC
Susán 1', 5'	Report	Carlos Scarone 42'; Luis Quaglia 56'

Estadio GEBA, Buenos Aires
Referee: Hétor Alfano

**Estudiantes (BA)**	**CURCC**

GK	(Argentina) E. Rojo
DF	(Argentina) A. Harris
DF	(Argentina) R. Lennie
MF	(Argentina) C. Rossi
MF	(Argentina) S. Parkinson
MF	(Argentina) A. Longhi
FW	(Argentina) José Susán
FW	(Argentina) F. Broggi
FW	(Argentina) Maximiliano Susan
FW	(Argentina) A. Maiztegui
FW	(Argentina) J. Luperne

GK	(England) Leonard Crossley
DF	(Uruguay) Juan Laguzzi
DF	(Uruguay) Eleuterio Pintos
MF	(Uruguay) Alfredo Betucci
MF	(Scotland) (Uruguay) John Harley
MF	(Uruguay) Carlos Ronzoni
FW	(Uruguay) Felipe Canavessi
FW	(Uruguay) Luis Quaglia
FW	(Uruguay) José Piendibene
FW	(Uruguay) Carlos Scarone
FW	(Uruguay) Pedro Zibechi

Suspended at 61' due to rain
