= 1905 Tie Cup final =

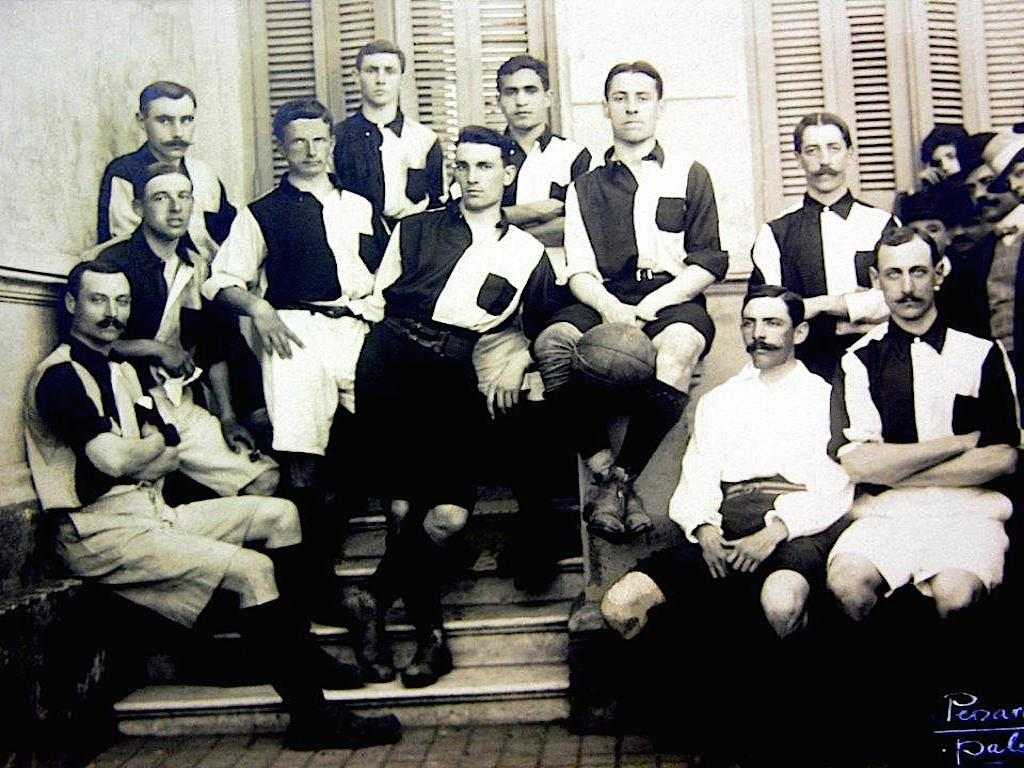
- Rosario A.C., champions
- Event: 1905 Tie Cup
| Rosario A.C. | CURCC |
| (Argentina) | (Uruguay) |
| 4 | 3 |
- (after extra time)
- Date: 3 September 1905
- Venue: Sociedad Sportiva, Buenos Aires
- Referee: Guillermo Jordán

The 1905 Tie Cup final was the final match to decide the winner of the Tie Cup, the 6th edition of the international competition organised by the Argentine and Uruguayan Associations together. The final was contested by the same teams than the previous year, Argentine Rosario A.C. and Uruguayan CURCC.

In the final, played at Sociedad Sportiva Argentina in Palermo, Buenos Aires, Rosario beat CURCC 4–3 in extra time, winning its second consecutive title and the third by then. Rosario also held the record of consecutive finals played, with five.

== Qualified teams ==
| Team | Previous final app. |
|---|---|
| (Argentina) Rosario A.C. | 5 (1900, 1901, **1902**, 1903, **1904**) |
| (Uruguay) CURCC | (none) |

- **Bold** indicates winning years

== Overview ==
This edition was contested by 10 clubs, 9 from Argentina and only one from Uruguay. Playing in a single-elimination tournament, Rosario A.C. beat Rosario Central 2–0 at Plaza Jewell in the Rosarino zone, qualifying to the semifinal, where they beat Belgrano 3–0 also in Plaza Jewell. On the other hand, CURCC directly entered in semifinal, where they defeated Alumni 1–0 at Parque Central.

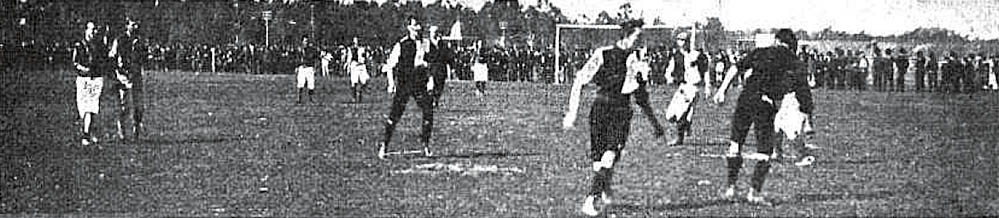
Scene of the final played at Sociedad Sportiva

The final was held in Sociedad Sportiva Argentina on September 3, 1905, with a high attendance. On 8 minutes Wells scored the first goal after goalkeeper Carbone failed to catch a shot by Le Bas. The second goal came soon after when Parr scored after a pass from Ricardo Le Bas from the left side while Carbone tried to stop the shot. CURCC replied with Camacho scoring after a pass from Pena. In the second half, the Uruguayan team forced the draw when Camacho headed the ball to the goal after a failure of Knight. Only two minutes after, Zibecchi shoot for the third goal of CURCC, which went to a 3–2 win after having recovered from a 0–2 disadvantage.

Nevertheless, referee Jordan awarded Rosario a penalty after Mazzulo touched the ball with his hand. Wells scored to tie the match, 3–3. That was the final result on 90 minutes so an extra time was played to determine the champion. On overtime, CURCC scored another goal that was annulled by the referee alleging foul to defender Knight. After that play, Stocks ran carrying the ball and after dribbling some adversaries, shot it to CURCC's goal. The ball hit the underside of the crossbar, bouncing down toward the line and was throwed out by Carbone. Referee Jordan conceded the goal to Rosario, causing CURCC players to leave the field in disagreement with his decision. Meanwhile, CURCC supporters jumpered into the field so the match was suspended with Rosario winning 4–3.

== Road to the final ==
- H: home
- A: away

| Rosario A.C. | | Round | CURCC | |
|---|---|---|---|---|
| Opponent | Result | Stage | Opponent | Result |
| (Argentina) Rosario Central | 2–0 (H) | Rosario zone | – | – |
| (Argentina) Belgrano A.C. | 3–0 (H) | Semifinal | (Argentina) Alumni | 1–0 (H) |

== Match details ==
1905 Tie Cup Final
3 September 1905
1:10 PM

| Rosario A.C. (Argentina) | 4–3 (a.e.t.) | (Uruguay) CURCC |
|---|---|---|
| M. O'Wells (2); J. Parr; Wilfred Stocks | Report | Aniceto Camacho; Pedro Zibechi; Ceferino Camacho |

Sociedad Sportiva Argentina, Buenos Aires
Referee: Guillermo Jordán

| **Rosario** | **CURCC** |

| GK | (Argentina) E. Knight |
| DF | (Argentina) Ricardo Le Bas |
| DF | (Argentina) George Middleton |
| MF | (Argentina) H. Talbot |
| MF | (Argentina) M. O'Wells |
| MF | (Argentina) K. Middleton |
| FW | (Argentina) Eduardo Le Bas |
| FW | (Argentina) Albert Le Bas |
| FW | (Argentina) J. Parr |
| FW | (Argentina) G. Roberts |
| FW | (Argentina) Wilfred Stocks |

| GK | (Uruguay) Francisco Carbone |
| DF | (Uruguay) Ángel Irisarri |
| DF | (Uruguay) Guillermo Davies |
| MF | (Uruguay) Luis Carbone |
| MF | (Uruguay) Lorenzo Mazzucco |
| MF | (Uruguay) Ceferino Camacho |
| FW | (Uruguay) Juan Pena |
| FW | (Uruguay) Edmundo Acevedo |
| FW | (Uruguay) Aniceto Camacho |
| FW | (Uruguay) Eugenio Mañana |
| FW | (Uruguay) Pedro Zibechi |
