= 1907 Tie Cup final =

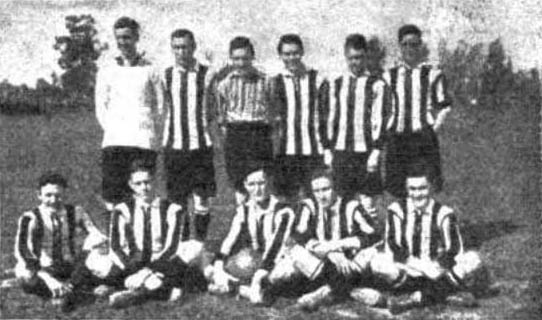
- Team of Alumni, winners
- Event: 1907 Tie Cup
Alumni	CURCC
(Argentina)	(Uruguay)
3	1
- Date: 29 September 1907
- Venue: Ferro Carril Oeste, Buenos Aires
- Man of the Match: Alfredo Brown
- Referee: S.F. Butterfield
- Attendance: 7,000

The 1907 Tie Cup final was the final match to decide the winner of the Tie Cup, the 8th edition of the international competition organised by the Argentine and Uruguayan Associations together. The final was contested by Argentine Alumni and Uruguayan CURCC.

In the final, played at Ferro Carril Oeste Stadium in Caballito, Buenos Aires with a full attendance of 7,000, Alumni beat CURCC 3–1, with goals by Alfredo Brown (2) and Eliseo Brown. The Argentine club won its fourth Tie Cup trophy while its captain Alfredo Brown was acclaimed as "man of the match" by the crowd at Ferro C. Oeste.

Since this edition, Argentine and Uruguayan clubs played in their own "Copa de Competencia" –Copa de Competencia Jockey Club (established that same year) and Copa de Competencia (Uruguay) respectively– and the winner of each competition qualified to the final.

== Qualified teams ==
Team	Qualification	Previous final app.
(Argentina) Alumni	1907 Copa de Competencia (A) champions	4 (**1901**, 1902, **1903, 1906**)
(Uruguay) CURCC	1907 Copa de Competencia (U) champions	2 (1904, 1905)

- **Bold** indicates winning years

== Venue ==
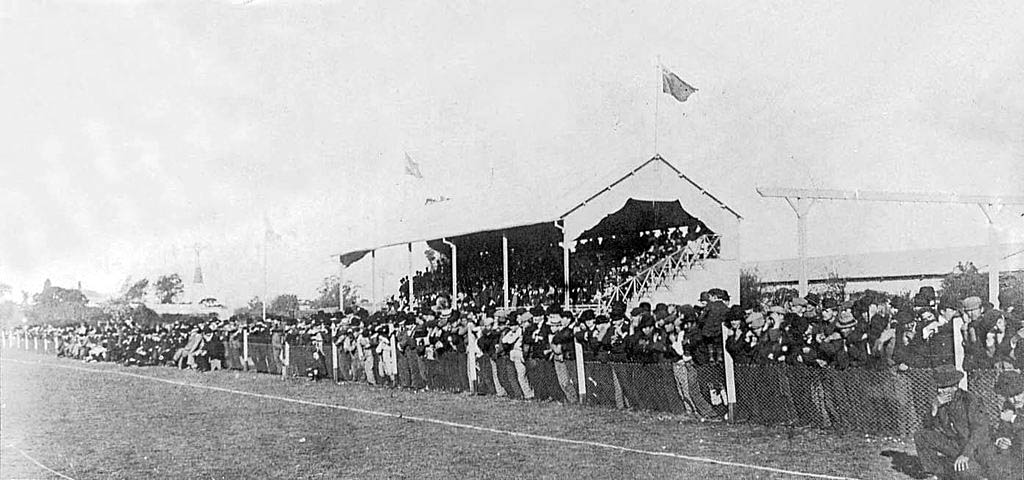
Ferro C. Oeste stadium in Caballito was the venue

== Overview ==
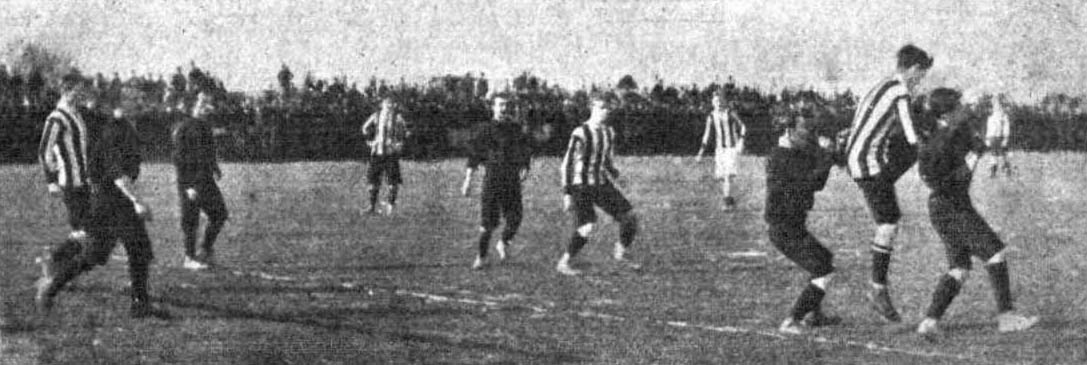
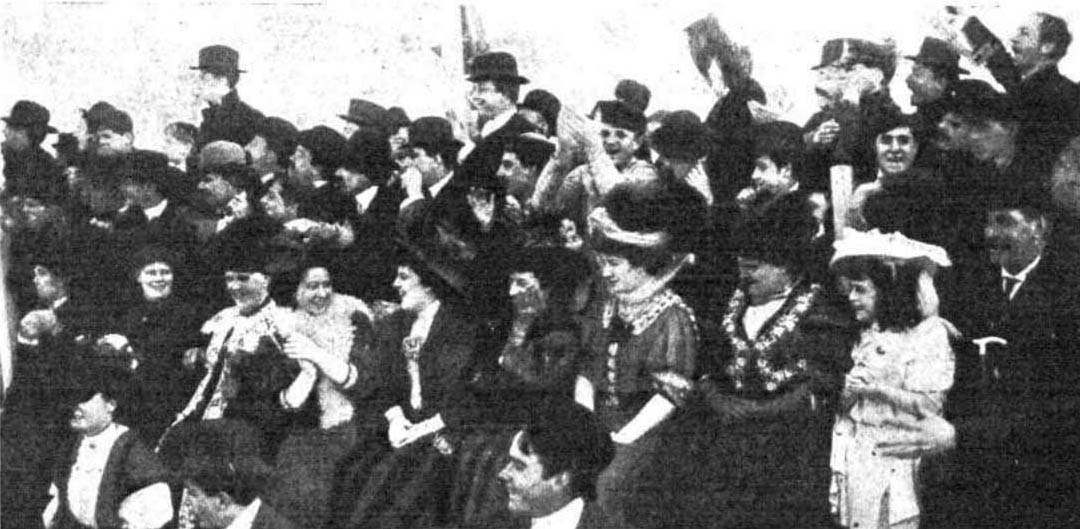
Two scenes of the match at Ferro C. Oeste, (above): players of both teams disputing the ball; (below): spectators celebrating the first goal of Alumni

Since this edition, Argentine and Uruguayan teams competed in their own competitions separately, with only the champions of the respectives Copa Competencia (Argentine and Uruguayan Cups) contested the final.

Alumni qualified for the final after having won the "Copa de Competencia Jockey Club", where the squad easily defeated all of its opponents, such as Porteño (8–0), Rosario Central (5–0), Reformer (5–0) and Reformer in the final (4–0). The match was held in Ferro Carril Oeste Stadium in Caballito on 29 September 1907, with an attendance of 7,000 spectators that filled the capacity of the venue.

With only 8 minutes played, CURCC forward Manito made a pass from the side to the Alumni's penalty area that hit one of goal posts before crossing the line, becoming the first goal of the match. Players of Alumni were surprised by the movement and did not react, thinking that a goal like that would not be possible. Five minutes later, Weiss made a long pass that Alfredo Brown finally connected to force a draw scoring for Alumni.

In the second half, Alumni had one player less on the field, nevertheless the Argentine side continued in offensive position, and after a corner kick, Juan Domingo Brown passed to his brother Alfredo, who dribbled three opponents before scoring the second goal for Alumni with a strong shot. Eliseo Brown scored the third goal for Alumni, securing a win that allowed Alumni to win their fourth title.

== Match details ==
1907 Tie Cup Final
29 September 1907

Alumni (Argentina)	3–1	(Uruguay) CURCC
A. Brown 13', 54'; E. Brown 81'	Report	Manito 8'

Ferro Carril Oeste, Buenos Aires
Attendance: 7,000
Referee: S.F. Butterfield

**Alumni**	**CURCC**

GK	(Argentina) W. A. Campbell
DF	(Argentina) Jorge Brown
DF	(Argentina) Juan Domingo Brown
MF	(Argentina) Guillermo Ross
MF	(Argentina) Carlos Lett
MF	(Argentina) Arthur Jacobs
FW	(Argentina) Gottlob Weiss
FW	(Argentina) Alfredo Brown
FW	(Argentina) Ernesto Brown
FW	(Argentina) Eliseo Brown
FW	(Argentina) James Lawrie

GK	(England) Leonard Crossley
DF	(Uruguay) Ángel Irisarri
DF	(Uruguay) M. Devincenzi
MF	(Uruguay) Guillermo Manito
MF	(Uruguay) Lorenzo Mazzucco
MF	(Uruguay) Ceferino Camacho
FW	(Uruguay) Eleuterio Pintos
FW	(Uruguay) Agustín Manito
FW	(Uruguay) Aniceto Camacho
FW	(Uruguay) Eugenio Mañana
FW	(Uruguay) Pedro Zibecchi
