= 1906 Tie Cup final =

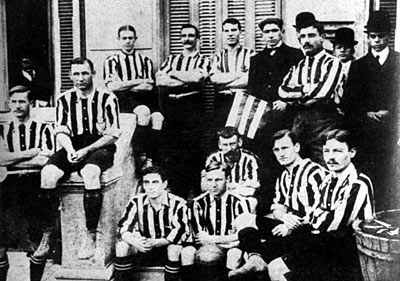
- An Alumni team of 1906
- Event: 1906 Tie Cup
Alumni	Belgrano A.C.
(Argentina)	(Argentina)
10	1
- Date: 30 August 1906
- Venue: Quilmes Stadium
- Referee: Guillermo Jordán

The 1906 Tie Cup final was the final match to decide the winner of the Tie Cup, the 4th edition of the international competition organised by the Argentine and Uruguayan Associations together. For the fifth time since 1900, there were two Argentine teams in the final, Alumni and Belgrano A.C., both from the Belgrano neighborhood, that also had a strong rivalry.

The match was held in the former Guido y Sarmiento Stadium of Quilmes Atlético Club on 30 August 1906. Alumni won its third Tie Cup trophy after beating Belgrano A.C. 10–1, the highest result in the history of the Tie Cup finals.

It was the last edition played under a group stage. Since 1907, the Tie Cup would be contested by the winners of the respective competitions in each country, Copa de Competencia Jockey Club (Argentina) and Copa de Competencia (Uruguay), playing a unique match to decide the champion.

== Qualified teams ==
Team	Previous final app.
(Argentina) Alumni	**1901**, 1902, **1903**
(Argentina) Belgrano A.C.	1900

- **Bold** indicates winning years

== Overview ==
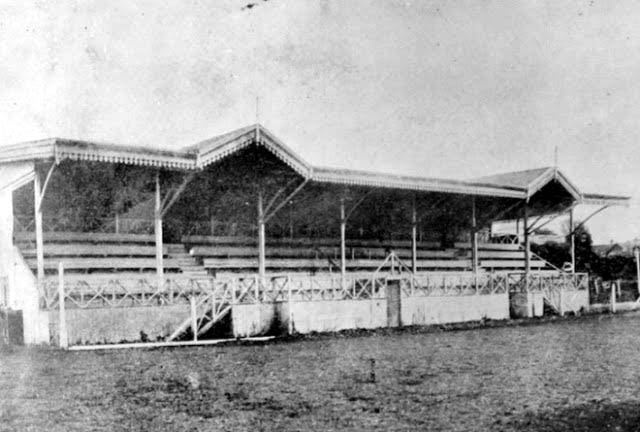
Quilmes Stadium, venue

Playing in a single-elimination tournament, Alumni beat Estudiantes (BA) 4–2 in Palermo, Reformer (3–2 in Campana), and then Belgrano Extra (presumibably a second team of Belgrano A.C.) 2–1 at Sociedad Sportiva Argentina. In the semifinals, Alumni defeated Uruguayan Montevideo Wanderers 2–0 at Estadio Gran Parque Central.

On the other hand, Belgrano beat San Isidro 6–0 as visitor, Quilmes (2–2 at San Martín, 5–3 in Quilmes), reaching the semifinal where the squad defeated Rosario Central 5–2 in Quilmes.

The final was played at Quilmes A.C. Stadium, and Alumni easily defeated Belgrano with a 10–1, achieving the highest score in a Tie Cup Final. Eliseo Brown was the keyplayer of the match, scoring 5 goals. According to media coverage, Alumni made a great performance, with the team showing coordinated movements (specially from its attacking players, who were absolutely effective showing great accuracy in their passing and shots).

== Road to the final ==
- H: home
- A: away

Alumni		Round	Belgrano A.C.	
Opponent	Result	Stage	Opponent	Result
(Argentina) Estudiantes (BA)	4–2 (A)	Preliminary round	(Argentina) San Isidro	6–1 (A)
(Argentina) Reformer	3–2 (A)	First round	(Argentina) Quilmes	2–2 (H) (Note: Finished at 80'.); 5–3 (A)
(Argentina) Belgrano Extra (Note: Second team of Belgrano A.C.)	2–1 (N) (Note: Played at Sociedad Sportiva Argentina.)	Second round	–	–
(Uruguay) Wanderers	2–0 (A)	Semifinal	(Argentina) Rosario Central	5–2 (N) (Note: Played at Quilmes AC ground.)

== Match details ==
1906 Tie Cup Final
30 August 1906

Alumni (Argentina)	10–1	(Argentina) Belgrano A.C.
A. Brown 10', 12', 67'; E. Brown ?', 32', 59', 65' (?); E.A. Brown 80'	Report	Dickinson 63' (o.g.); Whaley 88'

Quilmes Stadium, Quilmes
Referee: Guillermo Jordán

**Alumni**	**Belgrano**

GK	(Argentina) José Buruca Laforia
DF	(Argentina) Jorge Brown
DF	(Argentina) Juan Domingo Brown
MF	(Argentina) Andrés Mack
MF	(Argentina) Carlos Buchanan
MF	(Argentina) Patricio Browne
FW	(Argentina) Gottob E. Weiss
FW	(Argentina) Alfredo Brown
FW	(Argentina) Eliseo Brown
FW	(Argentina) Carlos Lett
FW	(Argentina) Ernesto Brown

GK	(Argentina) H. Doming
DF	(Argentina) W.W. Gordon
DF	(Argentina) Walter Buchanan
MF	(Argentina) Charles Dickinson
MF	(Argentina) Haroldo M. Grant
MF	(Argentina) George N. Dickinson
FW	(Argentina) Arthur H. Forrester
FW	(Argentina) Harold T. Ratcliff
FW	(Argentina) Carlos H. Whaley
FW	(Argentina) R. Singers
FW	(Argentina) Wilfredo Stocks
