= 1904 in Argentine football =

Football in Argentina
- Season: 1904

Men's football
- Primera División: Belgrano A.C.
- Segunda División: Barracas A.C. II
- Tercera División: Estudiantes (BA) III

1904 in Argentine football saw Belgrano A.C. winning the Argentine championship ending a run of four consecutive titles for Alumni. Estudiantes de Buenos Aires was promoted to Primera by the Association after the good campaigns made in lower divisions and the contribution made by the club to the practice of football.

Flores did not register to play the tournament after a poor performance in the last season.

== Primera División ==
The 1904 championship had a 6 team, league format, with each team playing the other twice.

=== Final standings ===
Pos	Team	Pts	G	W	D	L	Gf	Ga	Gd
1	Belgrano AC	18	10	9	0	1	30	9	+21
2	Alumni	13	10	5	3	2	18	9	+9
3	Lomas AC	11	10	5	1	4	9	10	-1
4	Barracas Athletic	10	10	5	0	5	13	16	-3
5	Estudiantes (BA)	5	10	2	1	7	12	27	-15
6	Quilmes	2	10	1	0	9	8	19	-11

== Lower divisions ==
=== Primera B ===
- Champion: Barracas Athletic II

=== Copa Bullrich ===
- Champion: Barracas Athletic II

=== Primera C ===
- Champion: Estudiantes (BA) III

== International cup ==
=== Tie Cup ===
- Champion: (Argentina) Rosario AC

==== Final ====
14 August 1904

Rosario A.C. (Argentina)	3–2 (a.e.t.)	(Uruguay) CURCC
	Report

Flores Old Ground, Buenos Aires
Attendance: 1,200
Referee: W. Leslie

== International friendlies ==
English team Southampton toured on Argentina that year, playing several friendly matches v. clubs and combined teams. It was the first time a professional British team visited Argentina.

Date	Venue/City	Rival	Score
26-Jun	Buenos Aires	Alumni	3–0
3-Jul	Buenos Aires	Británicos (Note: Team formed by British players that played in the Argentine league during the first years of the 20th Century.)	3–0
6-Jul	Buenos Aires	Belgrano A.C.	6–1
9-Jul	Buenos Aires	Argentinos (Note: Team formed by Argentinean players from the Argentine league during the first years of the 20th Century.)	8–0
10-Jul	Buenos Aires	Liga Argentina (Note: All-star team of the Argentine league.)	5−3
