= Charles Whaley =

Anglo-Argentine cricketer and footballer

Personal information
- Full name: Charles H. Whaley
- Born: Not known
- Died: Not known
- Batting: Unknown
- Bowling: Unknown

Career statistics
Competition	First-class
Matches	2
Runs scored	31
Batting average	10.33
100s/50s	–/–
Top score	21*
Balls bowled	96
Wickets	0
Bowling average	–
5 wickets in innings	–
10 wickets in match	–
Best bowling	–
Catches/stumpings	2/–
- Source: Cricinfo, 29 January 2022

Charles H. Whaley (dates of birth and death not known) was an Anglo-Argentine first-class cricketer and footballer.

== Background ==
Whaley played football as a striker for Belgrano Athletic Club and was the leading scorer for the club in the 1906 Tie Cup with 13 goals, including scoring Belgrano's only goal in their 10–1 Final defeat to Alumni. The following season, he was Belgrano's leading goalscorer in the Copa de Honor Municipalidad de Buenos Aires, with 6 goals. In October 1907, he appeared for the Argentina national team against Uruguay at Montevideo. He was again the leading goalscorer in the 1908 Tie Cup, with 5. In addition to playing international football, Whaley also played two first-class cricket matches for the Argentine cricket team against the touring Marylebone Cricket Club in February 1912, scoring 31 runs in these two matches, with a highest score of 21 not out. He also bowled 16 wicketless overs across both matches.
