= 1904 Tie Cup final =

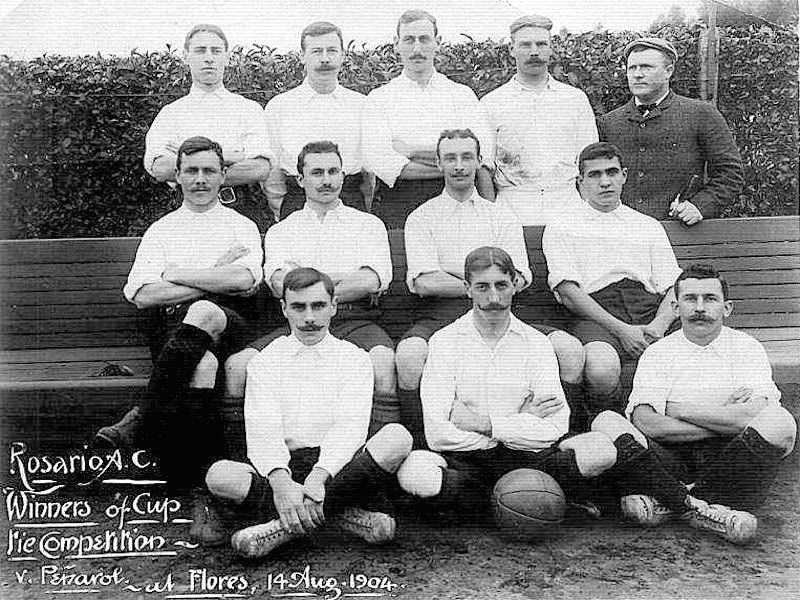
- Rosario A.C., champions
- Event: 1904 Tie Cup
Rosario A.C.	CURCC Peñarol
(Argentina)	(Uruguay)
3	2
- Date: August 14, 1904; 122 years ago
- Venue: Flores Old Ground, Buenos Aires
- Referee: W. Leslie
- Attendance: 1,200

The 1904 Tie Cup final was the final match to decide the winner of the Tie Cup, the 5th edition of the international competition organised by Argentine and Uruguayan Associations together

Argentine Rosario A.C. beat Uruguayan side, CURCC (the first team of that country to play a final as the previous finals had been contested only by Argentine sides) at Flores Old Ground stadium by 3–2 after extra time, winning its second title in this competition.

== Qualified teams ==
Team	Previous final app.
(Argentina) Rosario A.C.	4 (1900, 1901, **1902**, 1903)
(Uruguay) CURCC	(none)

- **Bold** indicates winning years

== Overview ==
Twelve teams took part of the competition, 8 from Argentina and 4 from Uruguay, after Flores and Montevideo Wanderers desisted to participate.

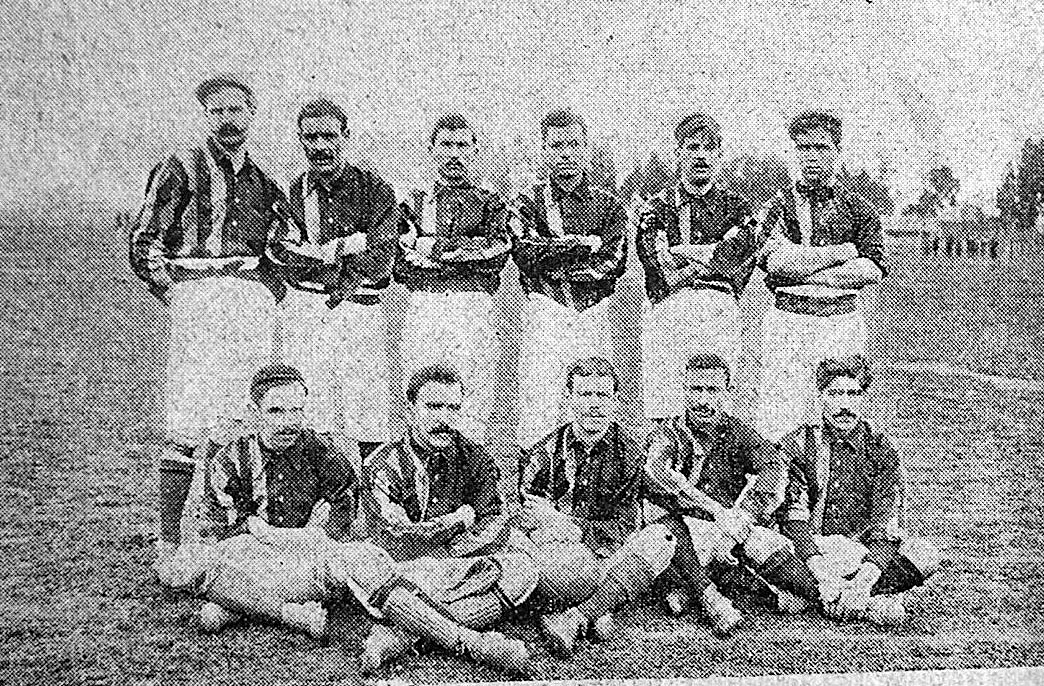
The CURCC team that played the final

In quarter finals, Rosario A.C. had beaten Rosario Central 2–0 (E.C. Jewell, Wells) in Plaza Jewell. The club then thrashed Barracas A.C. (that had previously eliminated Alumni) 5–3, also in Plaza Jewell. Rosario A.C. was losing the match 2–3 with only 19 minutes remaining to play. Uruguayan footballers Gaudencio Pigni and brothers Carlos and Bolívar Céspedes (that had escaped from their country due to the Civil War) played for Barracas A.C.

On the other hand, CURCC had become finalist after beating Albion (4–0), Nacional (2–1) and Lomas (4–1) on successive stages.

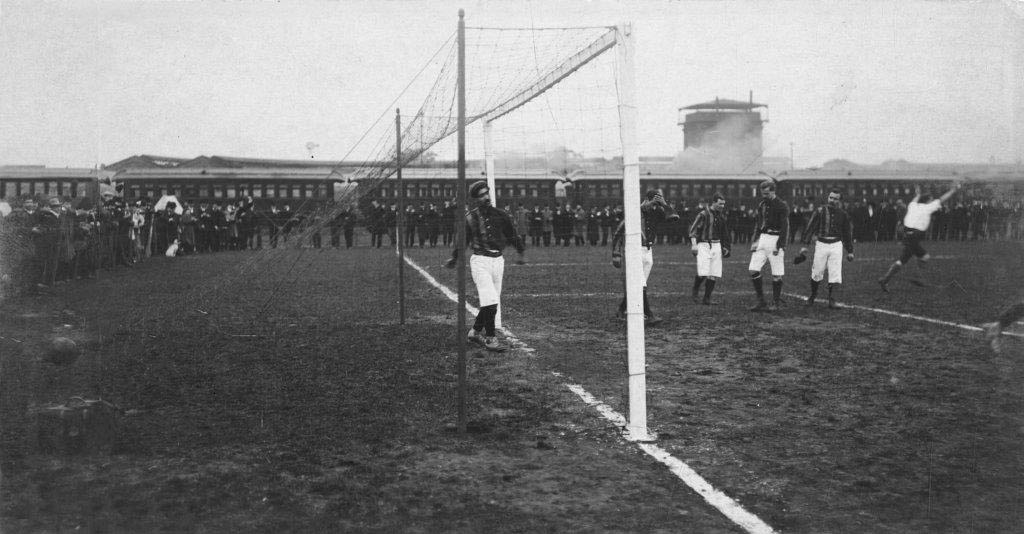
Players of Rosario celebrating the first goal scored by Alfredo Le Bas while the CURCC players regret

This final was the last relevant match played at Flores Ground, a field that could not host a large number of spectators due to its poor infrastructure. Because of that (and the cold weather) only 1,200 persons attended the match.

Rosario scored the first goal in the 10th minute when Le Bas shot to the CURCC's goal after a pass by Parr. In the second half, Camacho ran to the goal, being fouled by Wells when he was about to shoot. Pena converted the penalty kick to goal for the 1–1 tie, which would be the final score within the 90 minutes.

An extra time of 30' had to be played to crown a champion. In the 5th minute, Wells scored the 2nd goal for Rosario. The rest of the match saw Rosario shooting to CURCC goal but their kicks were stopped by Uruguayan goalkeeper Villalba. With only 5 minutes remaining, Alberto Le Bas scored the 3rd goal for the local squad. Three minutes later, Aniceto Camacho scored the 2nd for CURCC for the definitive 3–2 result.

This achievement contributed to consolidate Rosario Athletic as the strongest team of Rosario, being the first team from the city to win an international competition. Nevertheless, the club would abandon the practise of football in the 1910s, focusing on rugby union and field hockey.

== Road to the final ==
- H: home
- A: away

Rosario A.C.		Round	CURCC	
Opponent	Result	Stage	Opponent	Result
(Argentina) Rosario Central	2–0 (H)	Rosario zone	–	–
(Argentina) Barracas A.C.	1–0 (A)	Semifinal	(Argentina) Lomas	4–1 (H)

== Match details ==
1904 Tie Cup Final
14 August 1904

Rosario A.C. (Argentina)	3–2 (a.e.t.)	(Uruguay) CURCC
Alfredo Le Bas 10'; Wells 95'; Alberto Le Bas 115'	Report	Juan Pena (p.) 65'; Aniceto Camacho 118'

Flores Old Ground, Buenos Aires
Attendance: 1,200
Referee: W. Leslie

**Rosario**	**CURCC**

GK	H. Dorming
DF	R.W. Le Bas
DF	M.O. Wells
MF	H. Talbot
MF	E.C. Jewell
MF	C. Parr
FW	A.E. Le Bas
FW	A.O. Le Bas
FW	A.E. Wells
FW	J. Parr
FW	G. Topping

GK	J. Villalba
DF	A. Camacho
DF	W. Davies
MF	J. Camacho
MF	L. Mazzucco
MF	C. Camacho
FW	J. Pena
FW	E. Mañana
FW	W. Matheson
FW	E. H. Acevedo
FW	A.E. Acevedo
