= 1903 Tie Cup final =

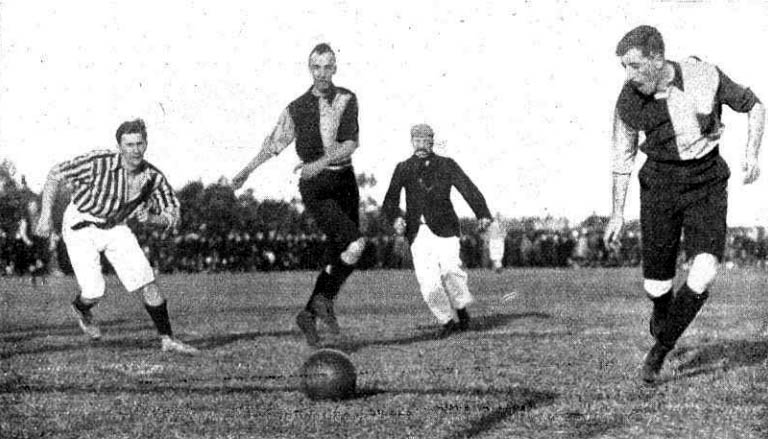
- A moment of the match
- Event: 1903 Tie Cup
Alumni	Rosario A.C.
(Argentina)	(Argentina)
3	2
- Date: August 16, 1903; 122 years ago
- Venue: Sociedad Sportiva, Buenos Aires
- Referee: R. W. Rudd

The 1903 Tie Cup final was the final match to decide the winner of the Tie Cup, the 4th edition of the international competition organised by Argentine and Uruguayan Associations together. As its previous editions, the final was contested by two teams from Argentina, Alumni (third consecutive final contested) and Rosario A.C. (fourth consecutive final).

The match, held in Sociedad Sportiva Argentina stadium, was won by Alumni 3–2 after extra time, winning its 2nd. title in this competition.

== Qualified teams ==
Team	Previous final app.
(Argentina) Alumni	**1901**, 1902
(Argentina) Rosario A.C.	1900, 1901, **1902**

- **Bold** indicates winning years

== Overview ==
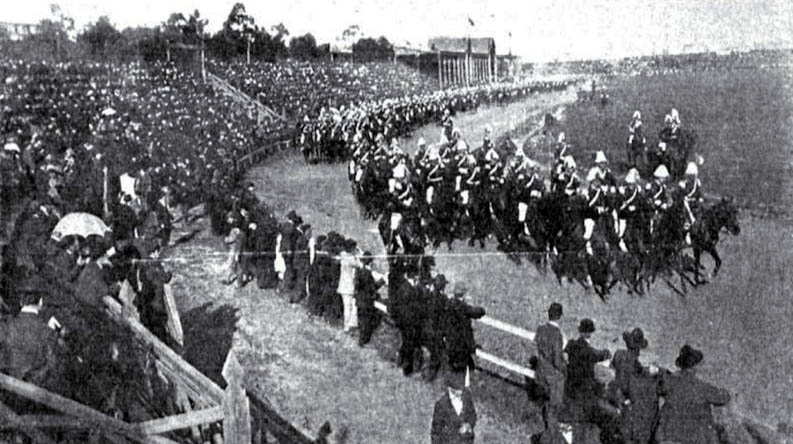
Sociedad Sportiva Argentina, venue of the final

The cup was contested by nine teams, with five playing in the Argentine Primera División, two from Rosarian League and two playing in Uruguayan league. Flores could not register in the tournament while Estudiantes (BA) declined to participate.

In the first round, Alumni achieved a large victory over arch-rival Belgrano A.C. (6–1) at Quilmes stadium while Rosario A.C. had thrashed Rosario Central 5–0 in Plaza Jewell. In semifinals, Alumni defeated Club Nacional de Football (1–0 at Parque Central) while Rosario A.C. beat Quilmes 2–0 in Plaza Jewell.

Although Rosario A.C. did not win the Cup, the club was in the road to consolidate not only as the main team in its city of origin but one of the strongest teams in Argentina, with four consecutive international finals played. Nevertheless, the club would abandon the practise of football in the 1910s, focusing on rugby union and field hockey.

== Road to the final ==
- H: home
- A: away

Alumni		Round	Rosario A.C.	
Opponent	Result	Stage	Opponent	Result
(Argentina) Belgrano A.C.	6–1 (N) (Note: Played at Quilmes A.C. ground.)	First round	–	–
–	–	Rosario zone	(Argentina) Rosario Central	5–0
(Uruguay) Nacional	1–0 (A)	Semifinal	(Argentina) Quilmes	2–0 (H)

== Match details ==
1903 Tie Cup Final
16 August 1903

Alumni (Argentina)	3–2 (a.e.t.)	(Argentina) Rosario A.C.
	Report

Sociedad Sportiva Argentina, Buenos Aires
Attendance: 4,000
Referee: W. Leslie

**Alumni**	**Rosario**

GK	Mc Kechnie
DF	Carlos Brown
DF	Walter Buchanan
MF	Arturo Mack
MF	Carlos Buchanan
MF	Ernesto Brown
FW	Patricio Dillon
FW	Juan Moore
FW	Jorge Brown
FW	S. Leonard
FW	Eugenio Moore

GK	F. Boardman
DF	R. Le Bas
DF	H. Middleton
MF	F. Warner
MF	E. Jewell
MF	C. Parr
FW	Alfredo Le Bas
FW	A.E. Wells
FW	J. Parr
FW	J. Topping
FW	Alberto Le Bas
