= Flores Old Ground =

Defunct multi-purpose stadium in Buenos Aires, Argentina

- Old Ground
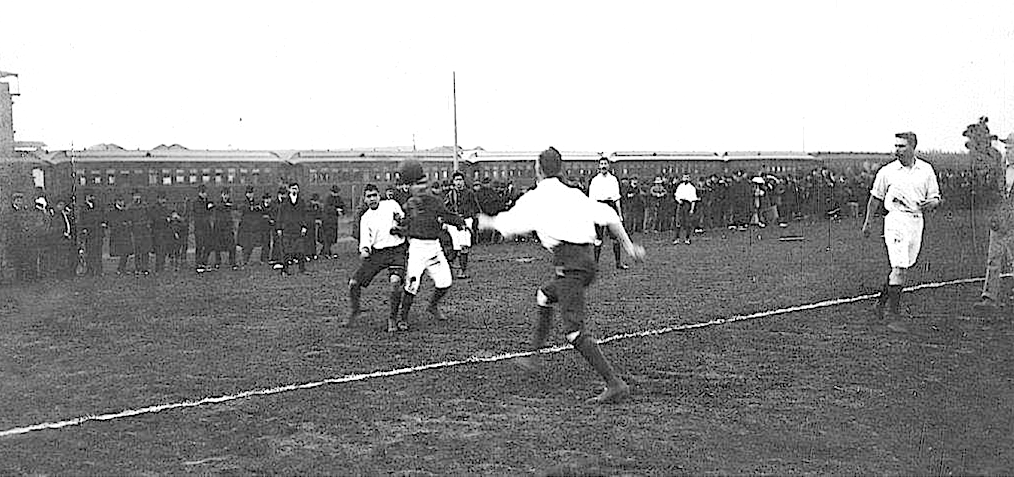
- View of the venue during a football match in 1904; some BA Western Railway coaches are visible at background
- Interactive map of Flores Old Ground
- Location: Caballito, Buenos Aires
- Owner: Flores A.C.
- Type: Stadium
- Surface: Grass

Construction
- Built: c. 1892
- Closed: c. 1907; 119 years ago

Tenants
- Flores A.C. (football, rugby, polo teams); Tie Cup finals (1900, 1904)

The Flores Old Ground (also known as "Old Polo Ground" or "Old Polo Field" or "Flores Polo Ground") was the stadium of defunct Flores Athletic Club. Located in the barrio of Caballito, Buenos Aires, just behind the Buenos Aires Western Railway freight sheds, it hosted several polo, rugby union, association football and cricket matches during the period Flores A.C. was active.

== History ==
By 1860 a big British community lived in the "porteños" neighborhoods of Caballito and Flores, with most of their members working in commerce activities. They usually spent summertime in their country houses located in Barracas, Belgrano and Flores, which was the favorite place of Argentine high society families to spend their free time. Some of the biggest palaces (such as "Miraflores", built in 1886 and currently a school, or "Las Lilas") had been erected in that zone.

"It is believed that the Flores Old Ground was located close to current Club Ferro Carril Oeste headquarters, between Avellaneda streets and the Sarmiento Railway tracks"

— Walter Ford, former player of the first polo match registered in Argentina, during an interview by Francisco Ceballos in the 1940s.

Flores A.C. was established in the same lot where in 1875 the first polo match had been played in Argentina.

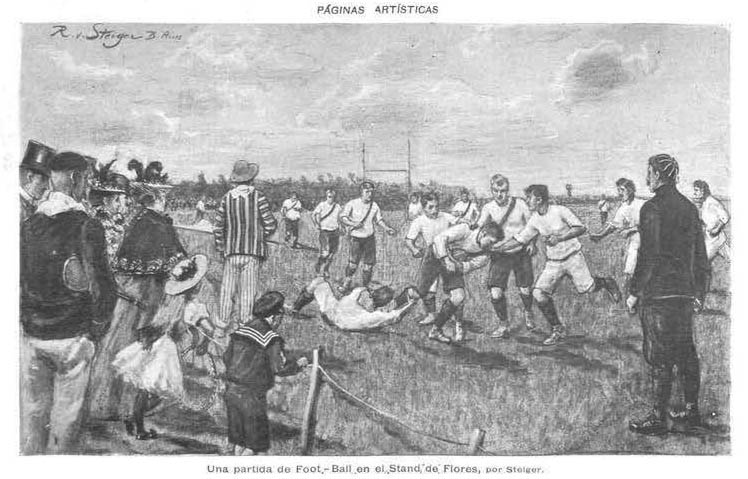
Illustration of a rugby union match at Flores Old Ground, 1899

The stadium was a multi-purposed venue, being used by the polo, rugby union and football teams from the club during the last years of the 19th century. The Old Ground was a recurrent venue not only for the Flores A.C. team (which played in Primera División from 1893 to 1897) but for other football teams such as Buenos Aires F.C. (Note: This was not the BAFC founded by the Hogg brothers but another football team that only participated in the 1891 championship. The squad (whose jersey was red and white in vertical stripes) played regularly at Flores Old Ground during that season.) in 1891. Moreover, the first final match of Argentine football (between St. Andrew's and Old Caledonians) was held in the Old Ground.

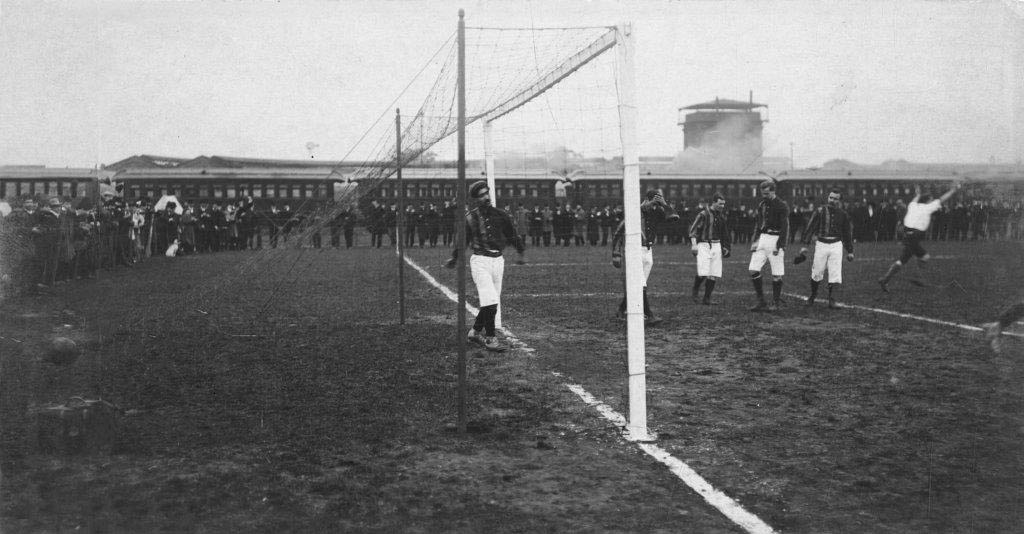
1904 Tie Cup Final: Rosario A.C. scoring to CURCC at Flores Old Ground

The Old Ground was also used as home venue by the rugby union (as the club was one of the founding members of Argentine Rugby Union) and polo teams from the institution.

In fact, the first registered rugby union match played by Flores A.C. was on July 19, 1896, against Buenos Aires FC at Flores Ground. The stadium was also used by the Buenos Aires FC to play Rosario Athletic Club.

The first notable football match played at Flores was the 1891 Argentine Primera División final when St. Andrew's defeated Old Caledonians 3–1. Both teams had been declared champions of the first official championship but the Association obliged them to play a match to decide which team would be awarded medals.

In 1900, the Old Ground hosted the Tie Cup final match when Belgrano A.C. beat Rosario A.C. by 2–0. The stadium would be used for another final game in 1904 when Rosario A.C. defeated Uruguayan team CURCC by 3–2.

In 1907 Flores Athletic sold some of its facilities to club Ferro Carril Oeste, for m$n 700. The agreement included two fields, but it is unclear if the Old Ground was part of the transaction.

== See also ==
- Flores Athletic Club
