= Tie Cup =

Tie Cup Competition
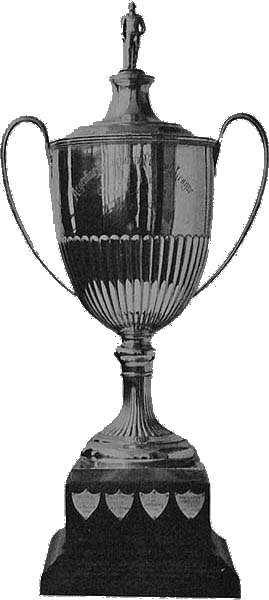
- The trophy awarded to champions
- Organiser(s): AFA; AUF
- Founded: 1900
- Abolished: 1919; 107 years ago
- Region: Buenos Aires city Greater Buenos Aires
- Related competitions: Copa Competencia (Arg); Copa Competencia (Uru)
- Last champions: (Argentina) Boca Juniors (1919)
- Most championships: (Argentina) Alumni (6 titles)

The Tie Cup Competition (also known as Copa de Competencia Chevallier Boutell) was an international football tournament played between representatives of the Argentina and Uruguay Associations. It was one of the earliest international football tournaments played between members of different national football associations, played on an annual basis until 1919.

== History ==
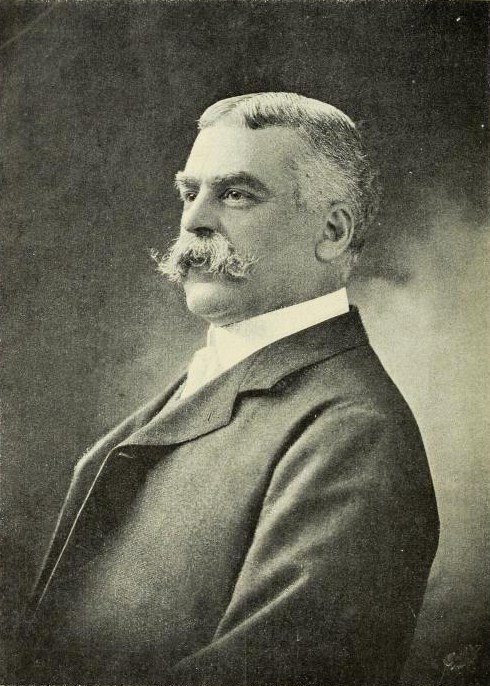
Francis Chevallier-Boutell donated the trophy

The competition was inspired by English FA Cup, with its trophy donated by Francis Hepburn Chevallier-Boutell, president of the Argentine Football Association (AFA), in 1900.

Initially, the competition included a total of four teams, with two from AFA, one from AUF and one from Liga Rosarina. That format remained until 1907, when the cup was contested between one representative each from Argentina and Uruguay. The participants were determined via qualification cups (Argentine Copa de Competencia Jockey Club and Uruguayan Copa de Competencia).

The Tie Cup was played only by First Division teams until 1918 when the Argentine Association stated that clubs from División Intermedia (the second division by then) were added to the competition.

== Format ==
The final matches were always played in the Buenos Aires Metropolitan Area (Buenos Aires city and Greater Buenos Aires). From 1900 to 1908, the cup was played under a single-elimination tournament format, contested by clubs from the Buenos Aires metropolitan area and Rosario (Argentina), and Montevideo (Uruguay).

From 1909 until the end of the competition, the Uruguayan representative was the winner of Copa de Competencia (Uruguay), while from 1913 to 1919, the Argentine representative was the winner of Copa de Competencia Jockey Club.

== List of champions ==
=== Finals ===
The following list includes all the editions of the Tie Cup Competition:

Keys

- a.e.t.: result/match won after extra time
- Second playoff result

Ed.	Year	Champion	Final score	Runner-up	Venue	City
1	1900	(Argentina) Belgrano AC (1)	2–0	(Argentina) Rosario AC	Flores Old Ground	Buenos Aires
2	1901	(Argentina) Alumni (1)	2–1 (a.e.t.)	(Argentina) Rosario AC	Lomas A.C.	Lomas de Zamora
3	1902	(Argentina) Rosario AC (1)	1–1 (a.e.t.)	(Argentina) Alumni	Sociedad Sportiva	Buenos Aires
3	1902	(Argentina) Rosario AC (1)	1–1 (a.e.t.) (Note: First playoff)	(Argentina) Alumni	Sociedad Sportiva	Buenos Aires
3	1902	(Argentina) Rosario AC (1)	2–1 (a.e.t.) (Note: Second playoff)	(Argentina) Alumni	Sociedad Sportiva	Buenos Aires
4	1903	(Argentina) Alumni (2)	3–2 (a.e.t.)	(Argentina) Rosario AC	Sociedad Sportiva	Buenos Aires
5	1904	(Argentina) Rosario AC (2)	3–2 (a.e.t.)	(Uruguay) CURCC (Note: The football division separated from the club, changing to Club Atlético Peñarol in 1913. Peñarol has been recognized by FIFA as the continuity of CURCC. Nevertheless, its main rival, Club Nacional de Football, alleged that CURCC and Peñarol were different clubs which coexisted until 1915, when CURCC was definitely dissolved.)	Flores Old Ground	Buenos Aires
6	1905	(Argentina) Rosario AC (3)	4–3 (a.e.t.)	(Uruguay) CURCC	Sociedad Sportiva	Buenos Aires
7	1906	(Argentina) Alumni (3)	10–1	(Argentina) Belgrano AC	Quilmes A.C.	Quilmes
8	1907	(Argentina) Alumni (4)	3–1	(Uruguay) CURCC	Ferro C. Oeste	Buenos Aires
9	1908	(Argentina) Alumni (5)	4–0	(Uruguay) Wanderers	Belgrano A.C.	Buenos Aires
10	1909	(Argentina) Alumni (6)	4–0	(Uruguay) CURCC	GEBA	Buenos Aires
11	1910	(No champion crowned) (Note: Estudiantes (BA) and CURCC played the final that ended in a 2–2 tie. A second game should have to be played after that, but it never happened and the tournament was therefore abandoned without proclaiming a champion.)			GEBA	Buenos Aires
12	1911	(Uruguay) Wanderers (1)	2–0	(Argentina) San Isidro	GEBA	Buenos Aires
13	1912	(Argentina) San Isidro (1)	1–0	(Uruguay) Nacional	Racing Club	Avellaneda
14	1913	(Uruguay) Nacional (1)	1–0	(Argentina) San Isidro	Racing Club	Avellaneda
15	1914	(Argentina) River Plate (1)	1–0	(Uruguay) Bristol	Ferro C. Oeste	Buenos Aires
16	1915	(Uruguay) Nacional (2)	2–0	(Argentina) Porteño	GEBA	Buenos Aires
17	1916	(Uruguay) Peñarol (1)	3–0	(Argentina) Rosario Central	Racing Club	Avellaneda
18	1917	(Uruguay) Wanderers (2)	4–0	(Argentina) Independiente	Racing Club	Avellaneda
19	1918	(Uruguay) Wanderers (3)	2–1	(Argentina) Porteño	GEBA	Buenos Aires
20	1919	(Argentina) Boca Juniors (1)	2–0	(Uruguay) Nacional	Sportivo Barracas	Buenos Aires

=== Titles by team ===
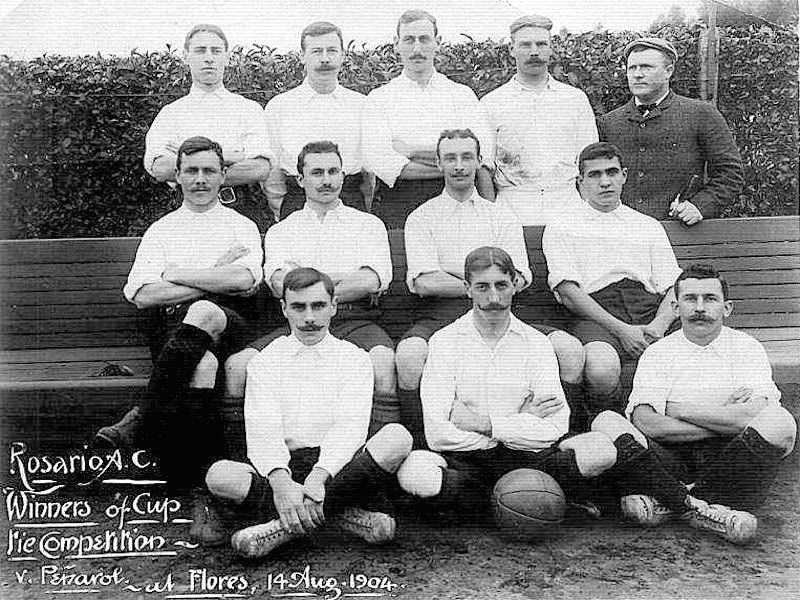
Rosario A.C., 1904 winner

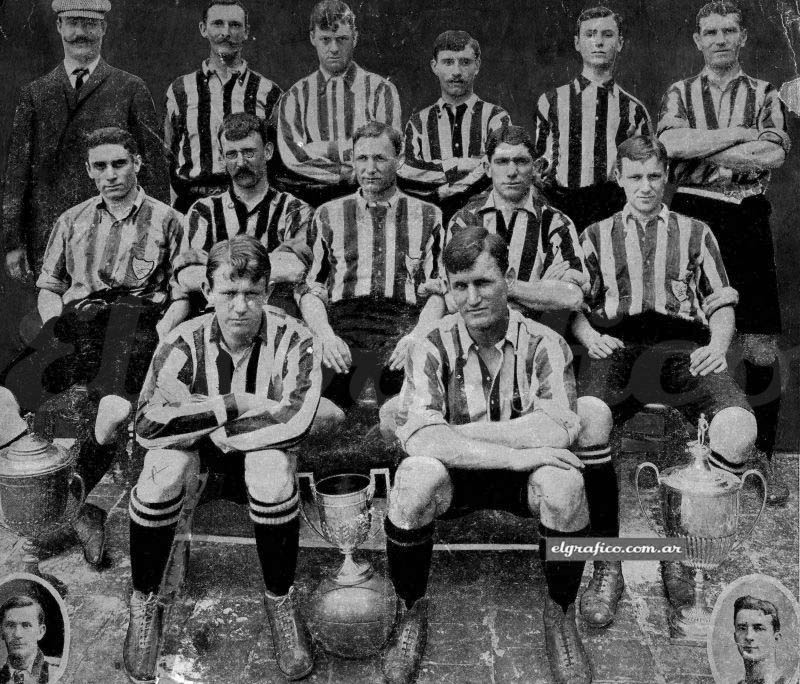
Argentine club Alumni (posing with the cup among other trophies) is the most winning team with 6 titles

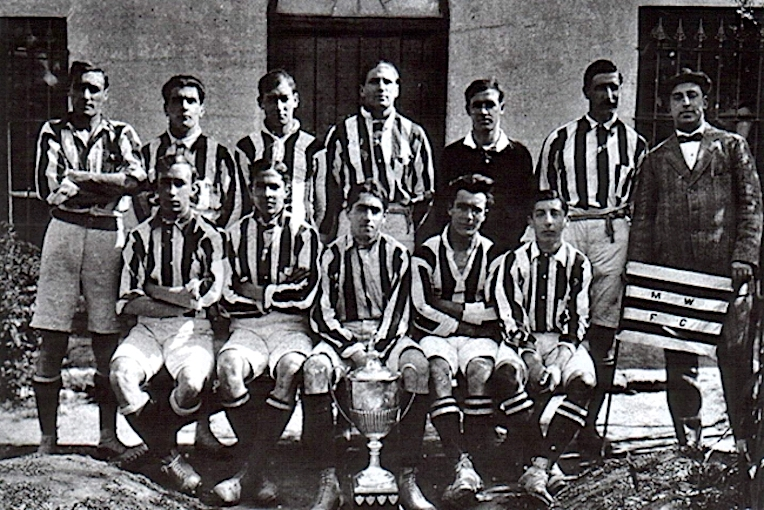
Montevideo Wanderers with the trophy in 1911

Team	Titles	Years won
(Argentina) Alumni	6	1901, 1903, 1906, 1907, 1908, 1909
(Argentina) Rosario AC	3	1902, 1904, 1905
(Uruguay) Wanderers	3	1911, 1917, 1918
(Uruguay) Nacional	2	1913, 1915
(Argentina) Belgrano AC	1	1900
(Argentina) San Isidro	1	1912
(Argentina) River Plate	1	1914
(Uruguay) Peñarol	1	1916
(Argentina) Boca Juniors	1	1919

=== Titles by country ===
Country	Titles	Teams
Argentina	13	Belgrano AC, Alumni, Rosario AC, San Isidro, River Plate, Boca Juniors
Uruguay	6	Wanderers, Nacional, Peñarol

== Topscorers ==
=== By year ===
Year	Player	Goals	Club
1900	Spencer Leonard	3	Alumni
1901	Spencer Leonard	2	Alumni
1901	Juan J. Moore	2	Alumni
1901	Julian Parr	2	Rosario AC
1901	Alberto Le Bas	2	Rosario AC
1902	Jorge Brown	4	Alumni
1902	Julian Parr	4	Rosario AC
1903	Jorge Brown	5	Alumni
1904	Arthur Wells	4	Rosario AC
1904	M.O. Wells	4	Rosario AC
1906	Charles Whaley	13	Belgrano AC
1907	Eliseo Brown	10	Alumni
1908	Charles Whaley	5	Belgrano AC
1909	Maximiliano Susan	12	Estudiantes (BA)
1910	Manuel González	11	Newell's Old Boys
1911	Juan O. Gil	6	San Isidro
1912	Julio Fernández	5	San Isidro
1913	Alberto Marcovecchio	9	Racing
1914	Alberto Marcovecchio	5	Racing
1915	Martín Garat	5	Porteño
1916	Guillermo Dannaher	4	Columbian
1917	Domingo Brisotti	4	Banfield
1917	Jorge Calandra	4	Estudiantes (LP)
1917	Pascual Garré	4	Independiente
1918	Pascual Polimeni	5	Porteño
1918	Humberto Libonatti	5	Gimnasia y Esgrima (R)
1919	Alberto Marcovecchio	7	Racing
1919	Ennis Hayes	7	Rosario Central

== See also ==
- Copa de Competencia Jockey Club
- Copa de Competencia (Uruguay)
- Francis Hepburn Chevallier-Boutell
