= Sociedad Sportiva Argentina =

Defunct sports club in Buenos Aires, Argentina

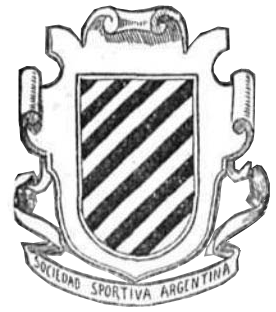
- Full name: Sociedad Sportiva Argentina
- Nicknames: Sportiva, Hípica
- Sport: List: Equestrianism; Football; Aviation; Aerostatics; Aeronautics; Boxing; Cycling; Trot; Sulky races; Show jumping; Athletics; Auto racing; Motorcycle racing; Rugby union
- Founded: 23 September 1899
- Folded: 1914; 112 years ago
- Based in: Buenos Aires
- Location: Florida 183
- Stadium: Av. Vértiz and Av. Dorrego, Palermo

The Sociedad Sportiva Argentina was an Argentine multi-sports club sited in Buenos Aires. The headquarters were located in Florida street nº 183 while the stadium was sited in Palermo, next to Hipódromo Argentino. Originally established in 1899 under the name "Sociedad Hípica Argentina" for the practise of equestrian activities, the Sociedad Sportiva would held a large variety of sport events in several disciplines, such as football, athletics, auto racing, aviation, aerostatics, aeronautics, boxing, bicycle racing, motorcycle racing, polo, rugby union, trot, sulky races, show jumping, among others.

The institution (nicknamed La Sportiva) was the main sports club of Argentina in the 1910 decade, and was considered a predecessor of the Argentine Olympic Committee (COA).

The club closed its doors in 1914, when the National Army took over the stadium after the second period of 5 years (counting from 1909) came to an end. In 1924 the Ministry of War led by Agustín P. Justo expropriated the lands and transferred them to the National Army, which has served as administrator since then. On those lands, there is now the "Campo Hípico Militar" (including the main polo stadium of Argentina, Campo Argentino de Polo, also known as La Catedral del Polo and current venue for the Campeonato Abierto Argentino).

== History ==
=== Beginning and consolidation ===
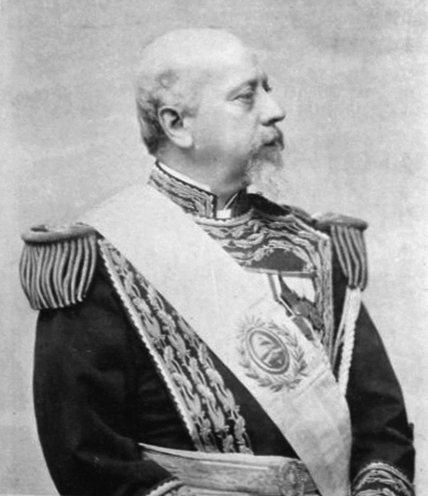
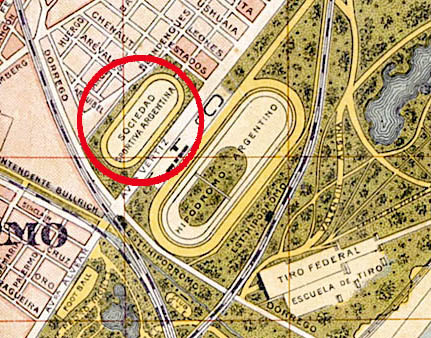
(Left): President of Argentina Julio A. Roca, one of the Sociedad Sportiva founders; (right): Location of the SSA on Avenida Virrey Vértiz (now Avenida del Libertador) of Palermo, near Hipódromo Argentino, from an old map of Buenos Aires

On September 23, 1899, "Sociedad Hípica Argentina" was established with the purpose of promote amateur equestrian activities. President of Argentina Julio Argentino Roca encouraged the creation of the club, being also one of its founders. The Municipality of Buenos Aires granted the new institution a land in Palermo to develop its activities. Club facilities included two tracks and a polo field. A grandstand was also built and inaugurated in 1900.

During the first two years of existence, the club focused on equestrian activities, including dressage and other disciplines such as gymnastics and calisthenics. In June 1902, Baron Antnio de Marchi (who had married one of Roca's daughters), became president of Sociedad Hípica. Under his presidency, the club changed its name to "Sociedad Sportiva Argentina", expanding the range of activities to other sports.

Club's facilities included two tracks (one of 1,100 x 20 m for trot and sulky competitions and the other of 1,000 x 20 m for show jumping). In the centre of both tracks, there was a land of 335 x 116 m used for polo and football matches. Around the tracks there also were grandstands divided into two sections, one for member and their families and another for general public. Other disciplines practised there were athletics and even car, motorcycle and bicycle racing. Football, polo and racing seasons ran from Abril to September.

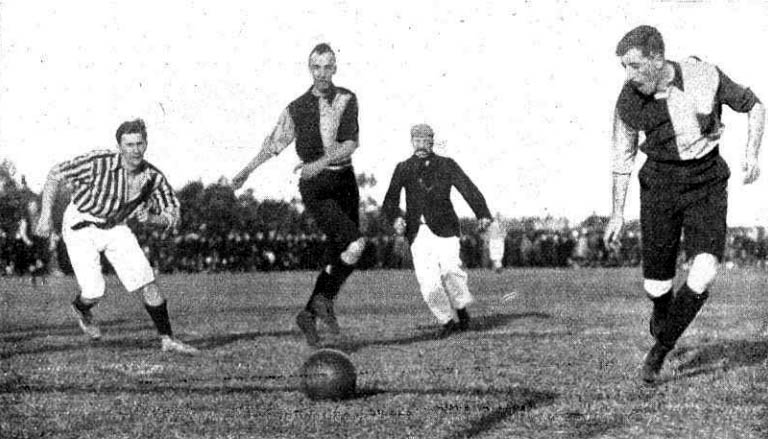
Scene of the match Alumni v Rosario A.C. at Sociedad Sportiva, 1903 Tie Cup Final

In football, the SSA held the Tie Cup finals of 1902, 1903 (played by Rosario A.C. and Alumni in both occasions) and 1905. In September 1903, the Argentina national football team played its first home game at Sociedad Sportiva, when the side lost to "Orientales" (represented by all players of Club Nacional de Football) by 3–2. Other notable football match played at SSA was the one between English club Southampton FC and Alumni on June 26, 1904, won by the visitors by 3–0. President Roca was one of the attendants. That same year, the SSA also held a Greco-Roman wrestling exhibition.

In 1904 the Sociedad Sportiva sold its facilities to the Ministry of War, although the concession stated they should be transferred to the Municipality of Buenos Aires. Nevertheless, the club would continue in that location during the 10 successive years. The Automóvil Club Argentino was established in the SSA clubhouse.

Football returned in 1905 when another English team, Nottingham Forest, toured Argentina to play a series of friendly matches, some of them at SSA. On August 15, 1905, the Argentina and Uruguay national teams played the first edition of Copa Lipton at SSA. The following year, the South Africa national team (affiliated with English "The Football Association") visited Argentina, playing Alumni at Sociedad Sportiva on June 24. Alumni won by 1–0, being the first win of an Argentine football squad against a British-related team.

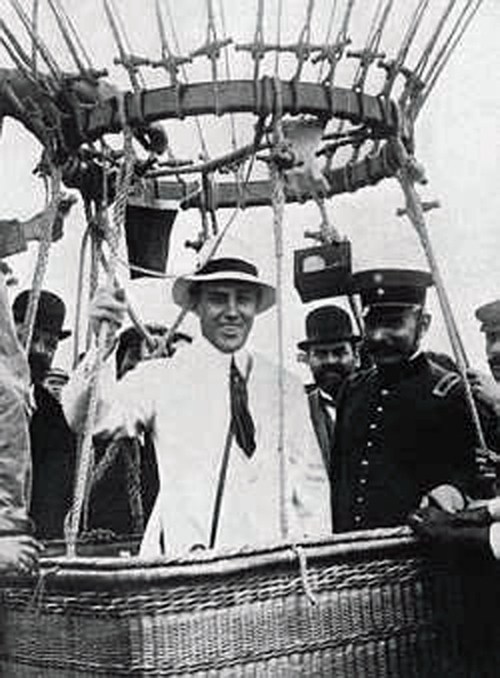
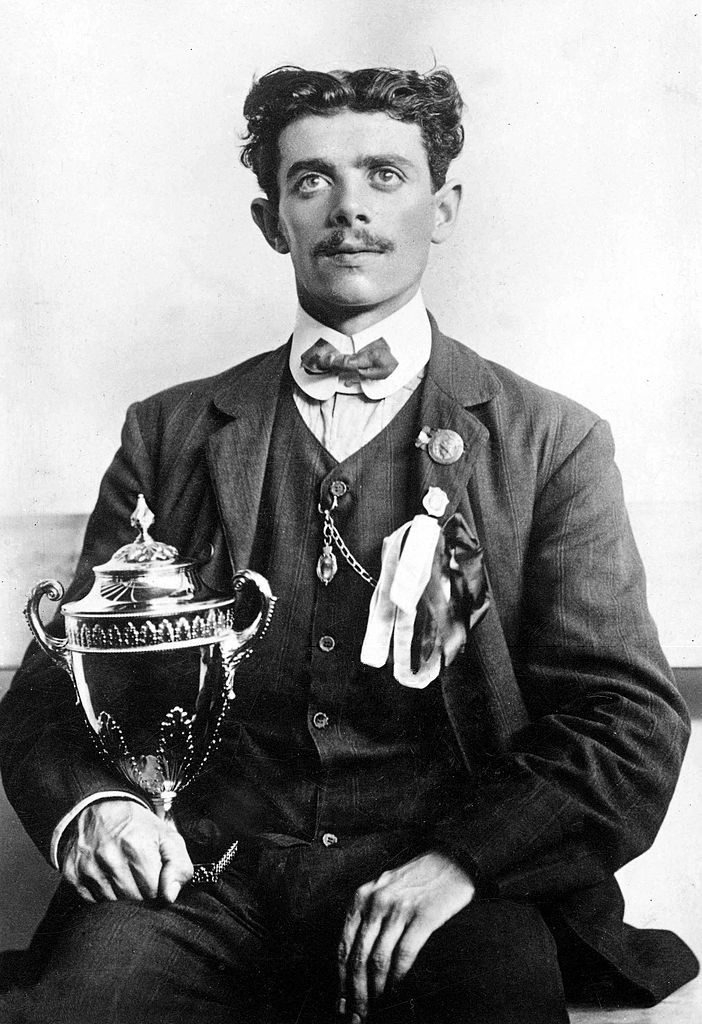
(Left): Jorge Newbery on board the Pampero balloon departed from Sociedad Sportiva to make his famous crossing of Río de la Plata in 1907; (right): Italian athlete Dorando Pietri was the main attraction of the Centennial Olympic Games held in the Sociedad Sportiva in 1910

On 25 December 1907, Jorge Newbery and Aarón Anchorena crossed the Río de la Plata in the balloon El Pampero before landing in Conchillas, Uruguay. El Pampero set out from the Sociedad Sportiva Argentina. In 1908, the traditional military parade commemorating the Argentine Declaration of Independence was held in the Sociedad Sportiva.

For the 1909 football season, the Football Association invited English teams Tottenham Hotspur and Everton to play a total of eight friendly matches vs. local teams. The five matches played in Buenos Aires were held in SSA, installing additional grandstands for a capacity of 10,000 people.

The Sociedad Sportiva also served as venue for the "Juegos Olímpicos del Centenario" ("Centennial Olympic Games), a series of competitions held as part of the celebrations to commemorate the Argentine Centennial in 1910. Italian athlete Dorando Pietri was the main attraction of the Games, and winner of the marathon celebrated in the SSA stadium.

Another milestone in Sociedad Sportiva's history was to have hosted the first Argentina national rugby union team match ever, when on June 12, 1910, the national side played British and Irish Lions in occasion of their first tour to Argentina. The people of Argentina termed it the "Combined British", also known as "Great Britain XV". Argentina lost 28–3, with the only try for Argentina being scored by Buenos Aires F.C. player Frank Heriot. (Note: Some sources cited C. McCarthy (player of Lomas A.C.) as the author of the first try instead Heriot.).

=== Decline ===
In 1912, the Sociedad Sportiva football team affiliated to dissident body Federación Argentina de Football (FAF) to play the Primera División championship. The team made poor campaigns, finishing in the last position in both, 1912 and 1913 seasons. That brief period would be the only participation of the club in official competitions.

With the predominance of Gimnasia y Esgrima Stadium as a football-specific venue in the 1910s decade, the SSA stadium would receive less attention to held football matches.

During its tour on South America, English club Exeter City had to play several matches in Buenos Aires. Despite the Argentine Football Association had rented the SSA stadium to the local Army, the Municipality of Buenos Aires revoked the rent claiming they were the owners of the lands so Exeter City moved to Racing Stadium to play its games vs. local combined teams. As a result, the Ministry of War, Gregorio Vélez, took the Sociedad Sportiva stadium, which returned to the Municipal government and the club was subsequently dissolved. The stadium was renamed "Stadium Municipal".

American boxer Jack Johnson made an exhibition fight in the Stadium in 1915. The Buenos Aires Council Member gave a special permission to hold the fight because the practise of boxing was prohibited in the city by then (boxing would be reinstalled in 1924).

In 1917, the AFA agreed with the Municipal Government to build a stadium with capacity for 50,000 spectators in the same place where the "Sportiva" facilities were located. Nevertheless, the project was never carried out. In 1924 the Minister of War, Agustín P. Justo, ordered the Army to occupy the SSA facilities again, claiming the field would be used for polo matches. Subsequently, the Army built the polo fields, opening them in 1928 (current Campo Argentino de Polo). The lands were the Sportiva were located, became "Campo Hípico Argentino" (or "Campo Hípico Militar") under the administration of the Army. The Campo Argentino de Polo was later rented to Argentine Polo Association.

== Gallery ==
Sports and social events at Sociedad Sportiva

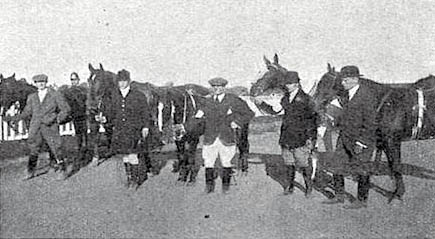
Winners of a trot competition, 1909

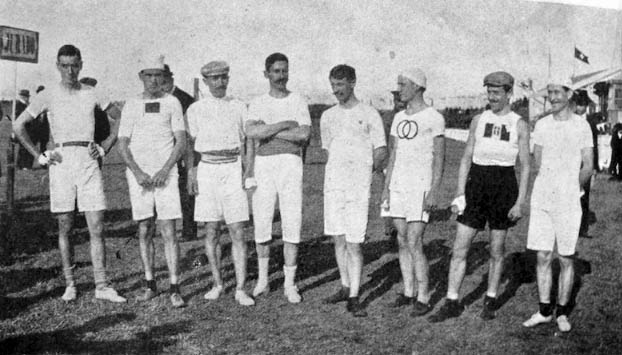
Runners of the marathon celebrating the Centennial of Argentina

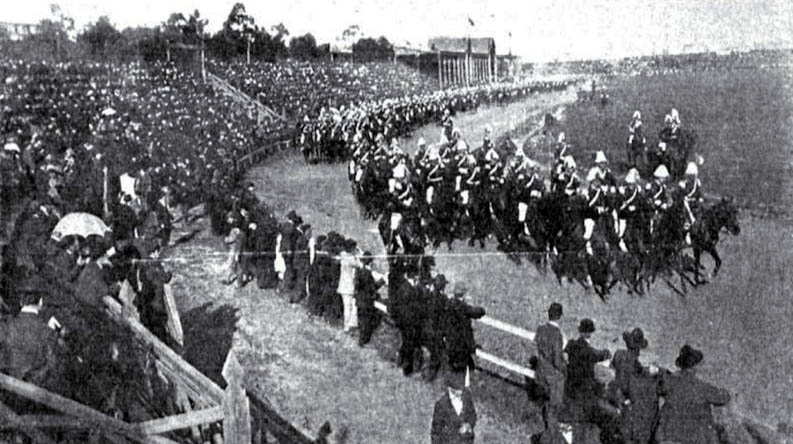
Military parade, 1910

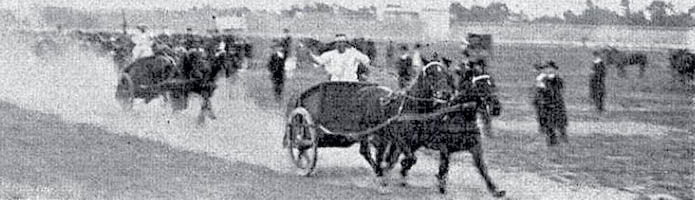
Roman biga race, c. 1910

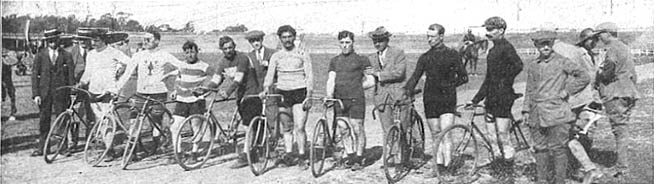
Cycling race in benefit of the Argentine Army, 1912

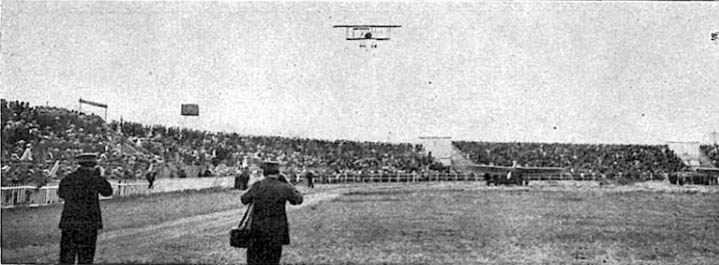
French aviator Marcel Paillette about to land on the stadium, 1912
