= Plaza Jewell =

Multi-use stadium in Rosario, Argentina

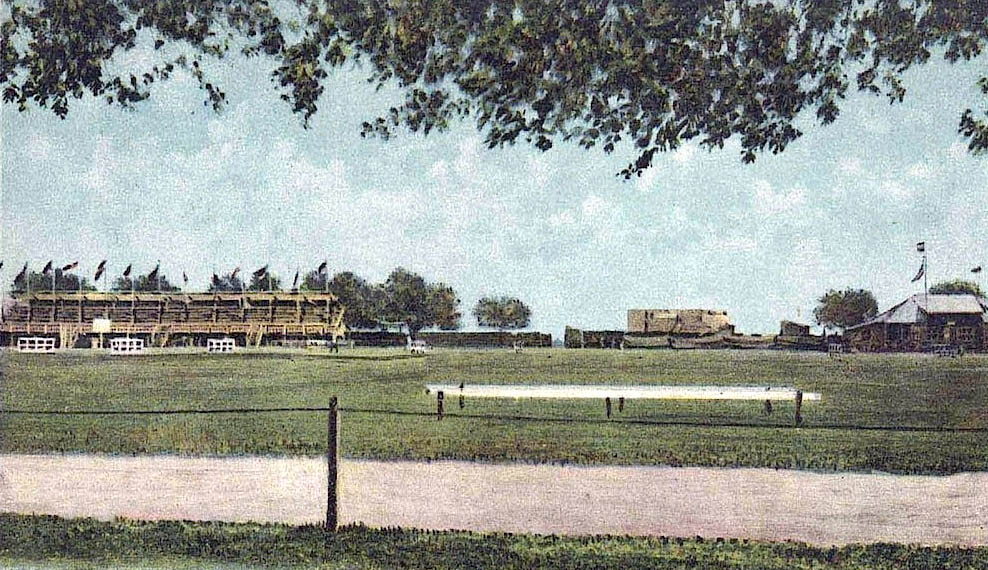
- The stadium depicted on a postcard c. 1900
- Interactive map of Plaza Jewell
- Address: Gould 865
- Location: Rosario, Argentina
- Owner: Club Atlético del Rosario
- Capacity: 4,000
- Type: Stadium
- Surface: Grass
- Current use: Rugby union

Construction
- Opened: 1889; 137 years ago

Tenants
- Atlético del Rosario football (1889–1916); Atlético del Rosario rugby (1889–present); Rosario Rugby Union team

Plaza Jewell is the name given to Club Atlético del Rosario headquarters and sports ground. It is located in the city of Rosario in Argentina, close to Mariano Moreno bus station and Rosario Norte railway station.

Having been opened in 1889, Plaza Jewell is the oldest sports ground in Argentina. Since its inauguration, the ground has held football (until 1916, when the club abandoned the practise of the sport) and rugby union matches, among other sports. Plaza Jewell stadium is the home venue of the rugby union senior squad, that currently competes in URBA Top 12.

== History ==
Rosario Cricket Club (established in 1867) had set its field on Presidente Roca and Jujuy streets, where the first inter-club rugby union (29 June 1886) and association football (12 July 1887) matches were played against the Buenos Aires Cricket Club teams. In 1884 the club changed its name to "Rosario Athletic Club", which would become its definitive name.

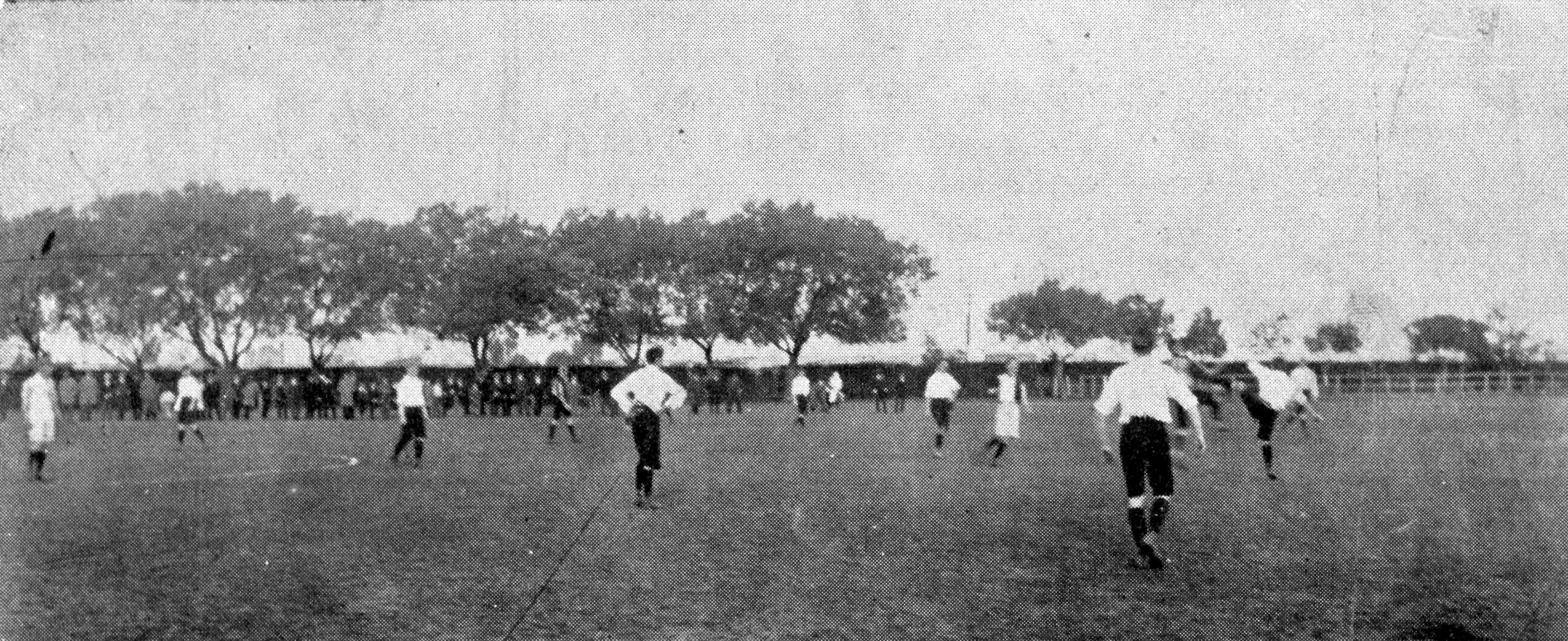
Association football match at Plaza Jewell, Rosario A.C. v Quilmes, 1903

In 1889 Rosario Athletic moved to its current location on Gould street, near the Rosario Norte and Santa Fe stations of Buenos Aires and Rosario and Province of Santa Fe railways, respectively. The land, donated by brothers Charles and Edward Jewell to the club, was named "Plaza Jewell" in honour of them. Officially inaugurated on August 30, Plaza Jewell is the oldest sports field in Argentina.

Rosario A.C. played its football and rugby home matches at Plaza Jewell. As club had the honour to be the first institution from Rosario playing in Primera División (in the 1894 season), Rosario A.C. played its home games at Plaza Jewell.

Some of the most relevant football matches played in Plaza were the win over Rosario Central 2–0 and Barracas A.C. (that had previously eliminated Alumni) 5–3, overcoming to a partial 2–3 with only 19 minutes remaining to play. Both matches of the 1904 Tie Cup, which Rosario would win after beating CURCC in the final. Curiously, the final was not held in Plaza Jewell but in Flores Old Ground of Buenos Aires.

Another historic landmark at Plata Jewell was the beginning of Clásico Rosarino (Rosarian Derby), where arch-rivals Rosario Central and Newell's Old Boys played each other for the first time on June 18, 1905. This inaugural derby was a game of the "Copa Santiago Pinasco", the first football competition in the city. Ricardo Le Bas (who was also the first president of Liga Rosarina de Football, as Rosario A.C. had been a founding member) was the referee of that match. The Atlético del Rosario football team was a regular participant in Rosario league until the club abandoned football in 1916.

In 1905, English side Nottingham Forest toured Argentina and Uruguay for the first time. Plaza Jewell held the only match in Rosario, where the English team beat a Rosario Combined –composed of players of Rosario Central and Rosario A.C. 5–3. One year later, the South Africa Football Association (a national side composed by British-origin players) also played a Rosario Combined at Plaza Jewell, with a large victory of 9–0 over the local team.

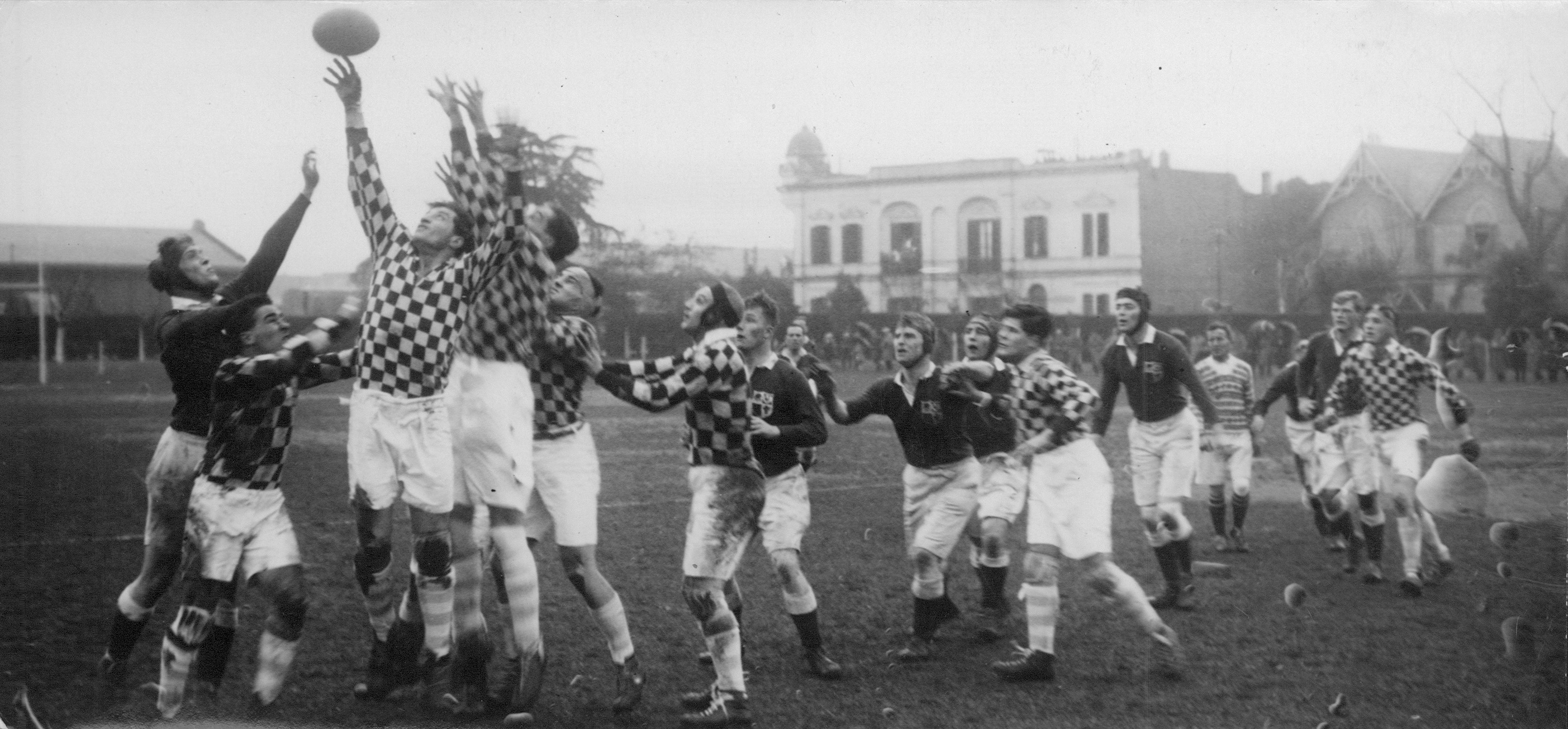
The British Lions playing a Universitario–Gimnasia y Esgrima combined at Plaza Jewell on August 3, 1927

On July 19, 1927, the British Isles Combined (composed of 23 players from England, Scotland and Ireland under the direction of James Baxter) arrived in Argentina to play a fixture of nine games.

After playing Argentina, the Lions moved to Rosario to play a combined team composed by players of porteños clubs Universitario and Gimnasia y Esgrima due to the impossibility of joining a competitive team with the small number of players in Rosario. Players of both teams arrived in Rosario after a long journey by train from Retiro to Rosario Norte station, the same day of the match. On August 3, 1927, the Lions defeated the combined team by 24–0 in a rainy day held in Plaza Jewell.

In 1967, Atlético del Rosario decided to organise a four-team football tournament to celebrate of its 100th. anniversary. It would be held in Plaza Jewell. The club invited the four main teams of Santa Fe Province, Rosario Central, Newell's Old Boys (Rosario) and Unión and Colón (Santa Fe) to take part of the competition (named "Copa Centenario" with a trophy awarded for the occasion). Nevertheless, the lack of available dates (all the invited teams were competing in the 1967 Primera División championship by those times) caused the competition was never carried out.

In 1969, the Scotland national rugby union team played vs the Rosario RU at Plaza Jewell, during their tour of Argentina that included six matches in the country.

== International matches ==
=== Rugby ===
The stadium has hosted several rugby union matches, such as follows:

Date	Event	Home team	Score	Away team	Ref.
3 Aug 1927	British Isles tour	Combined team (Note: Formed by Universitario and Gimnasia y Esgrima de Buenos Aires players.)	0–27	British Isles	
28 Jul 1932	Junior Springboks tour	Rosario RU	3–53	South Africa	
18 Sep 1969	Scotland tour	Rosario RU	6–20	Scotland	
2 Sep 1970	Ireland tour	Rosario RU	6–11	Ireland	
1 Nov 1972	South Africa tour	Rosario RU	12–42	Ireland	
