= 1902 Tie Cup final =

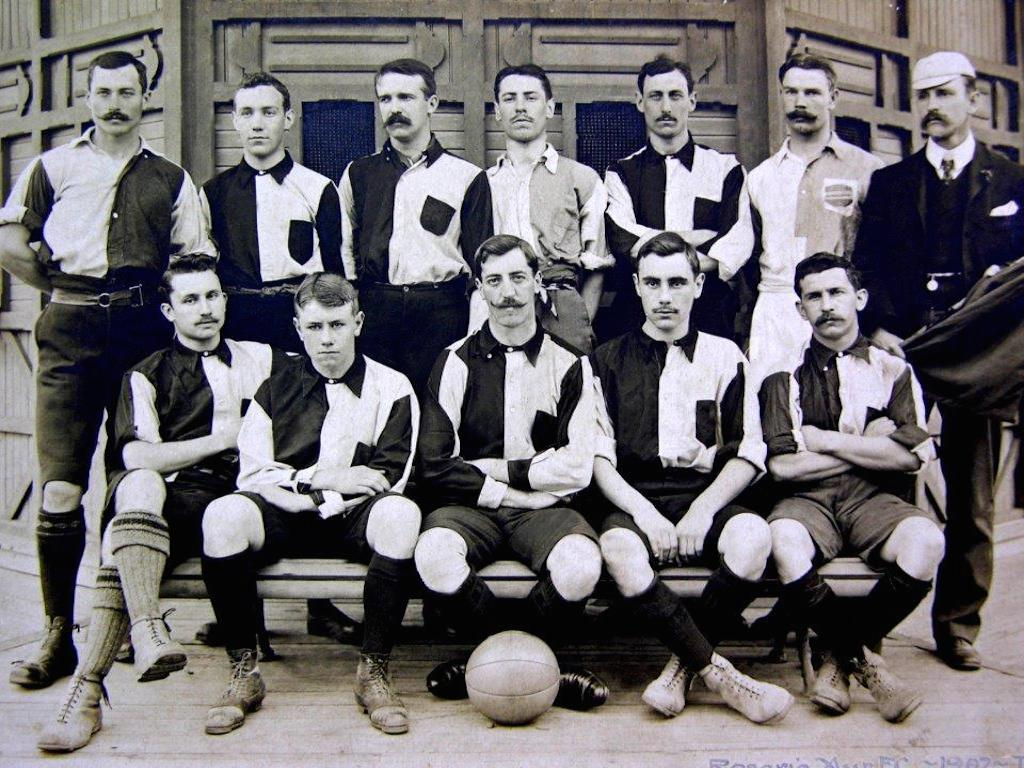
- Team of Rosario A.C., winners
- Event: 1902 Tie Cup
Alumni	Rosario A.C.
(Argentina)	(Argentina)
1	1
- (after extra time)
- Date: 24 August 1902
- Venue: Sociedad Sportiva, Buenos Aires

1902 Tie Cup final (Playoff)
- Event: 1902 Tie Cup
Alumni	Rosario A.C.
(Argentina)	(Argentina)
1	1
- (after extra time)
- Date: 14 September 1902
- Venue: Sociedad Sportiva, Buenos Aires

1902 Tie Cup final (2nd. Playoff)
- Event: 1902 Tie Cup
Alumni	Rosario A.C.
(Argentina)	(Argentina)
1	2
- (after extra time)
- Date: 28 September 1902
- Venue: Sociedad Sportiva, Buenos Aires

The 1902 Tie Cup final was the final match to decide the winner of the Tie Cup, the 3rd edition of the international competition organised by the Argentine and Uruguayan Associations together. The final was contested by the two same teams of the previous edition, Argentine sides Alumni and Rosario A.C., from Buenos Aires and Rosario respectively.

The winner was decided after a third match, where Rosario took revenge from the previous final and beat Alumni 2–1 in extra time after the match and the playoff ended 1–1 in both cases. All the matches were played at Sociedad Sportiva Argentina in Palermo, Buenos Aires. Rosario won its first Tie Cup after being finalist in the two previous editions.

== Qualified teams ==
Team	Previous final app.
(Argentina) Alumni	**1901**
(Argentina) Rosario A.C.	1900, 1901

- **Bold** indicates winning years

== Overview ==
For this edition, the number of participating teams increased to 11, 6 from Argentina and 5 from Uruguay. Playing in a single-elimination tournament, Rosario entered directly to the semifinal, where the squad beat Belgrano 2–0 at Plaza Jewell. On the other hand, Alumni defeated Barracas 2–0 at Quilmes A.C., Lomas (2-0 also in Quilmes), qualifying for the semifinal where the team beat Uruguayan CURCC at Paso del Molino.

The final was held in Sociedad Sportiva Argentina in Palermo, Buenos Aires on August 24, 1902. For the first time, tickets were charged, with all money collected went to charity. The match ended 1–1 and an extra time was added, with no modifications on the score. The game continued with an additional extra time of 20 minutes, but the match ended with no new goals. As a result, a playoff was scheduled for September 14 at the same venue. A new 1–1 draw (with three extra times of 30, 20 and 7 minutes) paved the road for a second playoff on September 28, also at La Sportiva. In that match, J. Moore scored but his goal was annulled. With a persistent attack by the Alumni players, Dillon scored after goalkeeper Boardman failed to stop a shot from Leonard. Nevertheless, in the play that followed the Alumni goal, Rosario A.C. forced the draw after J. Parr pushed the ball to the goal.

As the third match ended tied, an extra time of 30 minutes was played with no goals scored. After that, it was decided that the match would continued until one of the teams scored, ("golden goal" rule). It happened when J. Parr scored after a pass by Alfredo Le Bas. That goal crowned Rosario as new champion, finally beating Alumni 2–1 and winning its first Tie Cup trophy. J. Parr was proclaimed as the most valuable player.

== Road to the final ==
- H: home
- A: away

Alumni		Round	Rosario A.C.	
Opponent	Result	Stage	Opponent	Result
(Argentina) Barracas A.C.	1–1 (a.e.t.); 2–0 (N) (Note: Played at Lomas A.C. and Quilmes A.C. grounds respectively.)	Preliminary round	–	–
(Argentina) Lomas A.C.	2–0 (N) (Note: Played at Quilmes A.C. ground.)	First Round	–	–
(Uruguay) CURCC	2–0 (A)	Semifinal	(Argentina) Belgrano A.C.	2–0 (H)

== Match details ==
=== Final ===
1902 Tie Cup Final
24 August 1902

Alumni (Argentina)	1–1 (a.e.t.)	(Argentina) Rosario A.C.
Goal	Report	Goal

Sociedad Sportiva Argentina, Buenos Aires

=== Playoff ===
1902 Tie Cup Final
14 September 1902

Alumni (Argentina)	1–1 (a.e.t.)	(Argentina) Rosario A.C.
Goal	Report	Goal

Sociedad Sportiva Argentina, Buenos Aires

=== 2nd. Playoff ===
1902 Tie Cup Final
28 September 1902

Alumni (Argentina)	1–2 (a.e.t.)	(Argentina) Rosario A.C.
Moore	Report	Parr

Sociedad Sportiva Argentina, Buenos Aires

GK	(Argentina) J. Mac Kechnie
DF	(Argentina) Walter Buchanan
DF	(Argentina) Carlos Carr Brown
MF	(Argentina) Andrés Mack
MF	(Argentina) Carlos Buchanan
MF	(Argentina) Ernesto Brown
FW	(Argentina) Juan J. Moore
FW	(Argentina) Spencer Leonard
FW	(Argentina) Jorge Brown
FW	(Argentina) Eugenio Moore
FW	(Argentina) Patricio Dillon

GK	(Argentina) T. Boardman
DF	(Argentina) R. Le Bas
DF	(Argentina) George Middleton
MF	(Argentina) F. Warner
MF	(Argentina) E. Jewell
MF	(Argentina) C. Parr
FW	(Argentina) Alfredo Le Bas
FW	(Argentina) H. Middleton
FW	(Argentina) Alberto Le Bas
FW	(Argentina) J. Parr
FW	(Argentina) G. Toping
