= 1900 Tie Cup final =

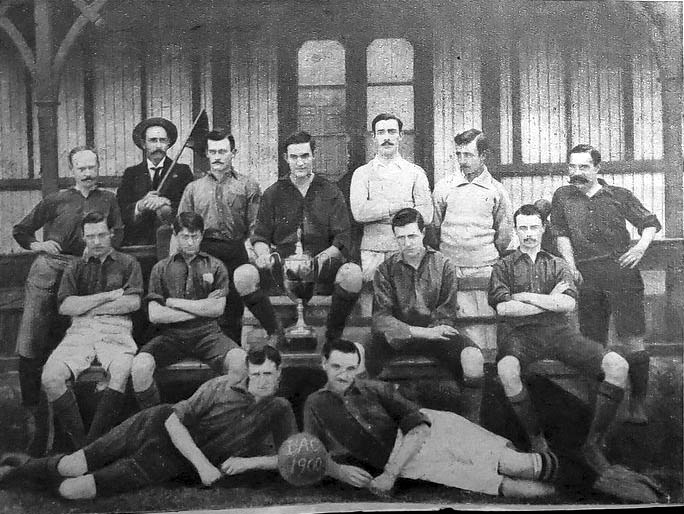
- Players of Belgrano A.C. with the trophy
- Event: 1900 Tie Cup
Belgrano A.C.	Rosario A.C.
(Argentina)	(Argentina)
2	0
- Date: 26 August 1900
- Venue: Flores Old Ground, Buenos Aires

The 1900 Tie Cup final was the final match to decide the winner of the Tie Cup, the 1st edition of the international competition organised by the Argentine and Uruguayan Associations together. The final was contested by two Argentine sides, Belgrano A.C. and Rosario A.C., from Buenos Aires and Rosario respectively.

The match was held in the Flores Old Ground in Caballito, Buenos Aires, on 25 August 1900. Belgrano won 2–0 with goals by F. Wiberley and Winston Coe, achieving its first Tie Cup trophy.

== Qualified teams ==
Team	Previous final app.
(Argentina) Belgrano A.C.	(none)
(Argentina) Rosario A.C.	(none)

== Overview ==
The first edition of the Tie Cup was contested by 6 teams, 4 from Argentina and 2 from Uruguay. Playing in a single-elimination tournament, Belgrano defeated Lomas (4–2 in Quilmes AC), and Albion in the semifinal (1–0 at Paso del Molino, Montevideo).

On the other hand, Rosario only played one match, qualifying for the final after beating English High School 3–1 at Plaza Jewell.

The final was played at the Flores Old Ground in Buenos Aires. In a very even game, Belgrano took advantage when Wibberley scored on 20'. After the goal, there were many attempts from Belgrano's players to score a second goal, but goalkeeper Herbert D. Dorming saved Rosario's goal in each one of them. Where there were only 2' left in the first half, Belgrano scored its second goal by forward Winston Coe.

== Road to the final ==
- H: home
- A: away

Belgrano A.C.		Round	Rosario A.C.	
Opponent	Result	Stage	Opponent	Result
(Argentina) Lomas A.C.	4–2 (N) (Note: Played at Quilmes A.C. ground.)	First Round	–	–
(Uruguay) Albion	1–0 (A)	Semifinal	(Argentina) English High School	2–0 (H)

== Match details ==
1900 Tie Cup Final
26 August 1900

Belgrano A.C. (Argentina)	2–0	(Argentina) Rosario A.C.
Wibberley 20'; Coe 43'	Report

Flores Old Ground, Buenos Aires
Referee: D.B.B. Syer

Belgrano A.C.	Rosario A.C.

GK	(Argentina) R. Barker
DF	(Argentina) G. Mc Farlane
DF	(Argentina) W. Creaven
MF	(Argentina) Anthony Addecott
MF	(Argentina) Harold Ratcliff
MF	(Argentina) Eduardo Duggan
FW	(Argentina) P. Mess
FW	(Argentina) Walter E. Malm
FW	(Argentina) Charles Dickinson
FW	(Argentina) F. Wibberley
FW	(Argentina) Winston Coe

GK	(Argentina) Herbert D. Dorming
DF	(Argentina) Jorge A. Middleton
DF	(Argentina) William S. Penman
MF	(Argentina) G. Bradford
MF	(Argentina) Eduardo C. Jewell
MF	(Argentina) S. Angel
FW	(Argentina) G. Topping
FW	(Argentina) Julian G. Parr
FW	(Argentina) A. E. Wells
FW	(Argentina) Miguel Green
FW	(Argentina) Alfredo W. Le Bas
