= Copa de Competencia (Uruguay) =

- Organiser(s): AUF
- Founded: 1900
- Abolished: 1925; 101 years ago
- Region: Uruguay
- Qualifier for: Tie Cup
- Related competitions: Copa Competencia (Arg)
- Last champions: Nacional (1923)
- Most championships: Nacional (8 titles)

Copa de Competencia was a Uruguayan football competition organized by the Uruguayan Football Association (AUF) that which took place between 1900 and 1925. The champion of this tournament qualified to play the Tie Cup (also known as "Copa Chevallier Boutell") against the Argentine champion of Copa de Competencia Jockey Club.

== History ==
The first Copa de Competencia champion was Albion F.C. in 1900, the same year that AUF was established.

From 1900 to 1906 the winner qualified to the semifinals of Tie Cup. In 1907 the rule was modified therefore the winner was allowed to play the final against the Argentine winner, being the matches always played in Buenos Aires. It lasted until 1919. the 1921 and 1923 editions were disputed by Uruguayan teams only.

The most successful team was Nacional which awarded the trophy 8 times.

== List of champions ==
Ed.	Year	Champion	Runner-up
1	1900	Albion	
2	1901	CURCC	
3	1902	CURCC	
4	1903	Nacional	
5	1904	CURCC	Nacional
6	1905	CURCC	Montevideo Wanderers
7	1906	Montevideo Wanderers	
8	1907	CURCC	
9	1908	Montevideo Wanderers	Nacional
10	1909	CURCC	Oriental
11	1910	CURCC	Montevideo Wanderers
12	1911	Montevideo Wanderers	River Plate FC
13	1912	Nacional	River Plate FC
14	1913	Nacional	Montevideo Wanderers
15	1914	Nacional	Peñarol
16	1915	Nacional	Central
17	1916	Peñarol	River Plate FC
18	1917	Montevideo Wanderers	Universal
19	1918	Montevideo Wanderers	Nacional
20	1919	Nacional	Peñarol
21	1921	Nacional	Central
22	1923	Nacional	Belgrano
23	1925	Not finished	

== Titles by team ==
Team	Titles	Years won
Nacional	8	1903, 1912, 1913, 1914, 1915, 1919, 1921, 1923
CURCC/Peñarol (Note: With Peñarol being recognised as a CURCC's continuity by FIFA, the club included the championships won by CURCC in its own honours. Controversy exists on the date of the founding of C.A. Peñarol. The club's official position assumes a change of name of CURCC (founded on December 28, 1891). On the other hand, some historians state that "C.A. Peñarol" was established on December 13, 1913.)	8	1901, 1902, 1904, 1905, 1907, 1909, 1910, 1916
Montevideo Wanderers	5	1906, 1908, 1911, 1917, 1918
Albion	1	1900

== See also ==
- Copa de Competencia Jockey Club
- Tie Cup
