= 1901 Tie Cup final =

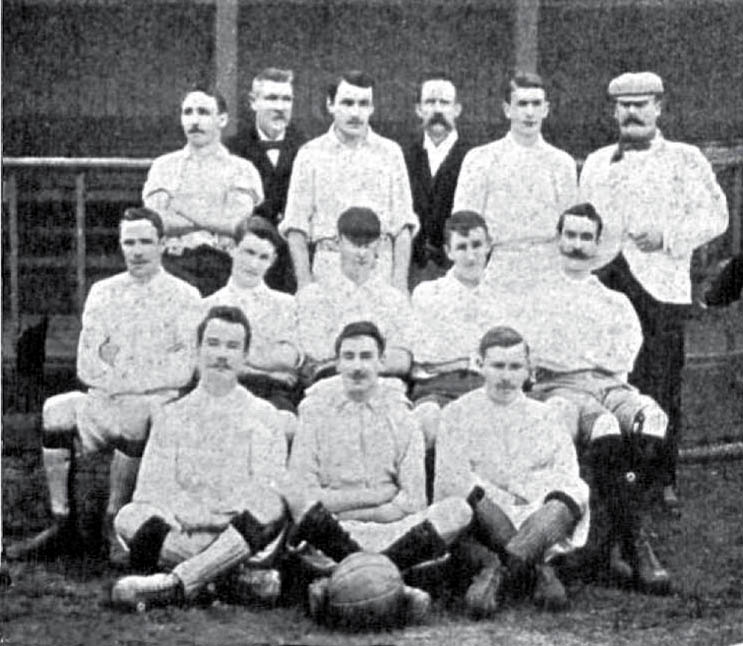
- Team of Alumni, winner in the final
- Event: 1901 Tie Cup
Alumni	Rosario A.C.
(Argentina)	(Argentina)
2	1
- (after extra time)
- Date: 25 August 1901
- Venue: Lomas A.C., Lomas de Zamora

The 1901 Tie Cup final was the final match to decide the winner of the Tie Cup, the 2nd edition of the international competition organised by the Argentine and Uruguayan Associations together. The final was contested by two Argentine sides, Alumni and Rosario A.C., from Buenos Aires and Rosario respectively.

Alumni played its first final while Rosario contested its second consecutive final. The match was held in the Lomas Athletic field in the suburb of Lomas de Zamora, on 25 August 1901. Alumni won 2–1 in extra time with goals by Spencer Leonard and Patricio Dillon, achieving its first Tie Cup trophy.

== Qualified teams ==
Team	Previous final app.
(Argentina) Alumni	(none)
(Argentina) Rosario A.C.	1900

== Overview ==
This edition was contested by 6 teams, 4 from Argentina and 2 from Uruguay. Playing in a single-elimination tournament, Belgrano defeated Lomas (4–0 in Quilmes AC), and Uruguayan side CURCC in the semifinal (1–0 at Parque Central, Montevideo).

On the other hand, Rosario only played one match, qualifying for the final after thrashing Belgrano 6–2 at Plaza Jewell.

The final was played at the Lomas Athletic field in Lomas de Zamora, Greater Buenos Aires. The match lead a great expectation from supporters of both clubs, who arrived in a train run for the occasion by British railway company Ferrocarril del Sud. On 8 minutes Alumni's S. Leonard scored the first goal. After that, Rosario persistently attacked but their attempts were blocked by the Alumni backs. Nevertheless, in the second half Rosario forced a 1–1 draw when A. Robinson scored on 60'. As the match ended tied, an 30' extra time was played to determine a winner, but no goal was scored during that time. Therefore, a new extra time (20') was added to decide which team would be champion, with Patricio Dillon scoring the second goal that crowned Alumni as champion, after 140 minutes of play.

== Road to the final ==
- H: home
- A: away

Alumni		Round	Rosario A.C.	
Opponent	Result	Stage	Opponent	Result
(Argentina) Lomas A.C.	4–0 (N) (Note: Played at Quilmes A.C. ground.)	First Round	–	–
(Uruguay) CURCC	1–0 (A)	Semifinal	(Argentina) Belgrano A.C.	6–2 (a.e.t.) (H)

== Match details ==
1901 Tie Cup Final
25 August 1901

Alumni (Argentina)	2–1 (a.e.t.)	(Argentina) Rosario A.C.
Leonard 8'; Dillon 140'	Report	60' A. Robinson

Lomas A.C., Lomas de Zamora

Alumni	Rosario A.C.

GK	(Argentina) A. Coste
DF	(Argentina) Walter Buchanan
DF	(Argentina) Carlos Carr Brown
MF	(Argentina) Tomás Brown
MF	(Argentina) Andrés Mack
MF	(Argentina) Ernesto Brown
FW	(Argentina) Patricio Dillon
FW	(Argentina) Juan J. Moore
FW	(Argentina) Spencer Leonard
FW	(Argentina) C. Taylor
FW	(Argentina) Eugenio Moore

GK	(Argentina) A. Willcox
DF	(Argentina) G. Middleton
DF	(Argentina) W. Penman
MF	(Argentina) V. Parr
MF	(Argentina) H. Middleton
MF	(Argentina) C. Parr
FW	(Argentina) Alfredo Le Bas
FW	(Argentina) A. Robinson
FW	(Argentina) M. Green
FW	(Argentina) J. Parr
FW	(Argentina) Alberto Le Bas.
