= Club Atlético del Rosario =

Argentine sports club

(Argentina) Atlético del Rosario
- Full name: Club Atlético del Rosario
- Union: URBA
- Nickname: Plaza
- Founded: 27 March 1867; 159 years ago
- Location: Rosario, Santa Fe, Argentina
- Ground: Plaza Jewell
- President: Leandro Salvatierra
- Coach(es): Mauro Cingolani; Nicolas Torno
- League: Top 14
- 2026: 10th.
Team kit

Official website
- atleticodelrosario.club

Club Atlético del Rosario is an Argentine amateur sports club from Rosario, Santa Fe. One of the oldest clubs still in existence in the country, Atlético del Rosario was a pioneer of football in Rosario, being the first team from that city to play in Primera División, the top division of the Argentine football league system. At the international level, Rosario A.C. was also the first team outside Buenos Aires to win an international tournament, the Tie Cup on three occasions. Atlético was also a founding member of the Liga Rosarina de Football, the main body that organised the practice of association football in Rosario from 1905 to 1930.

Nowadays, Atlético del Rosario is mostly known for its rugby union team, having been a founding member of the "River Plate Rugby Union Championship" (current Argentine Rugby Union) in 1899. The senior squad currently plays in Primera A, the second division of the URBA league system.

Club's home venue and headquarters are located on Plaza Jewell. The ground, opened in 1889, is the oldest in Argentina.

The club also has a women's field hockey team playing in the Litoral A championship, the first division of the Litoral Hockey Association league system. Apart from rugby and hockey, sports practised at the club are cricket, football, tennis, and swimming.

Atlético del Rosario was also founding member of many sports bodies in Argentina, some of them are Argentine Rugby Union (1899); Liga Rosarina de Football (1905), Argentine Tennis Association (1912), Rosario Rugby Union (1928), among others.

== History ==
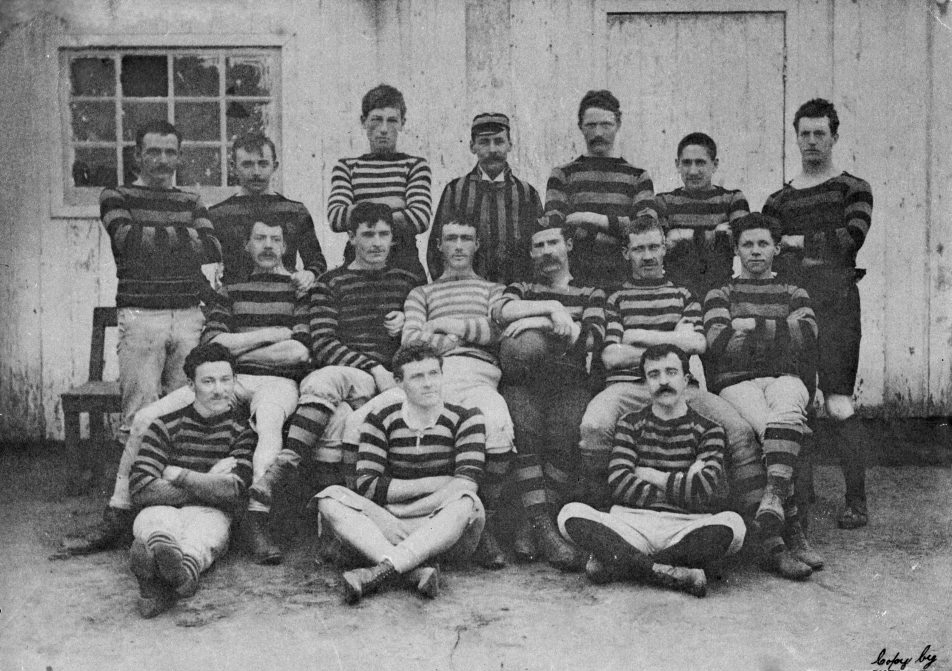
Rosario A.C. squad of 1884, the oldest photo of a rugby team in Argentina

The club was founded as a cricket institution by workers of the British company Central Argentine Railway that were building the Rosario–Córdoba line. Originally named "Rosario Cricket Club", it was established on March 27, 1867. The RCC and the Buenos Aires Cricket Club (established in 1864) are recognised as the first sports club of Argentina.

During its first years of existence, the club had several fields that served for sports practice. The club rented a land on Presidente Roca and Jujuy streets, where many sports (such as baseball, bicycle races, cricket, croquet, football, polo, quoits, rugby, tennis) were practised. The "Justas Atléticas" (an annual athletics competition) were also held there. Due to the variety of sports practiced, the club was referred to as "the Athletic Society" instead of "the Cricket Society". Finally, the club changed its name to "Rosario Athletic Club", between May and August 1884.

Some highlights during those years were the first inter-club rugby union (29 June 1886) and association football (12 July 1887) matches, played against Buenos Aires Cricket Club teams.

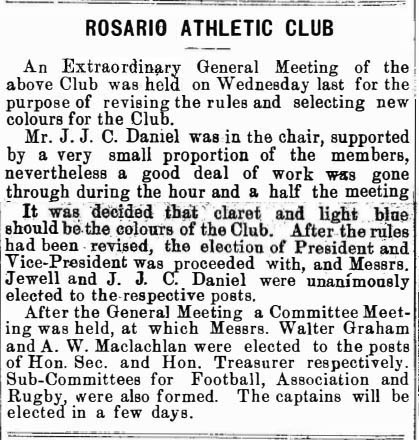
In 1892, the club adopted the claret and light blue colors, as reported in local newspapers

In 1889 the club moved to its current location at Plaza Jewell, named after brothers Charles and Edward Jewell who gifted a 24,000 m2 land to the club. Officially inaugurated on August 30, Plaza Jewell is the oldest sports ground in Argentina. In April 1892, Atlético del Rosario adopted "claret and light blue" as its official colors in a general meeting, remaining as club's colors since then.

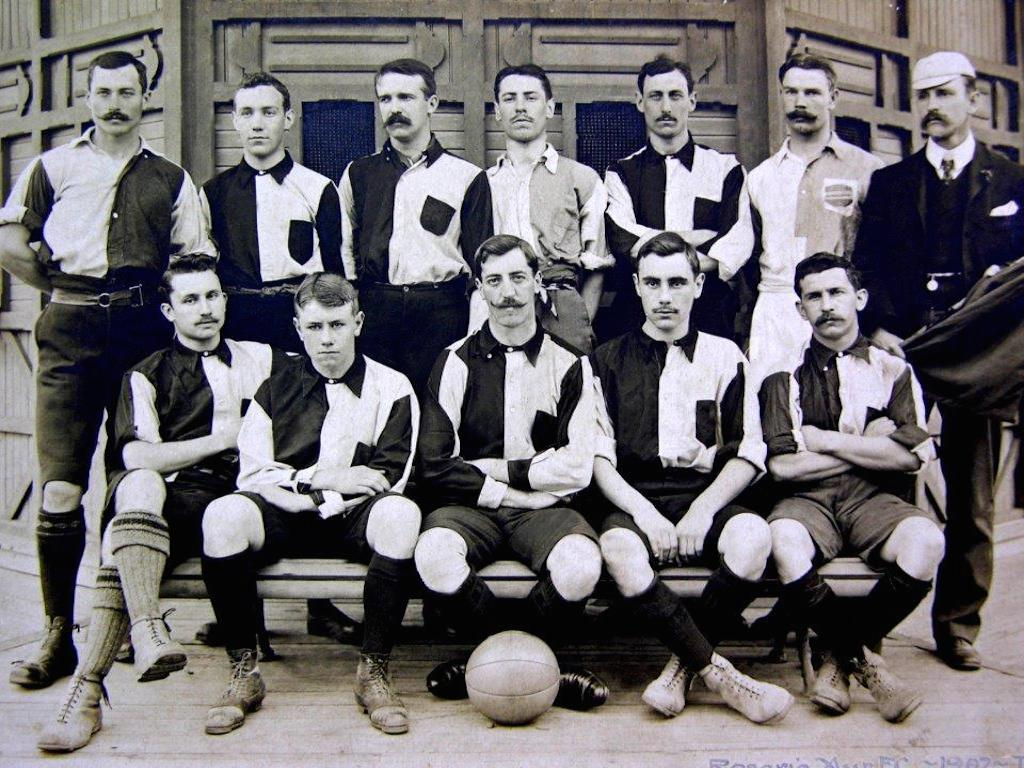
The team that won the international football Tie Cup in 1902

In football, the club had the honour to be the first club from Rosario playing in Primera División although the squad only participated in the 1894 championship. Rosario A.C. was invited by the Argentine and Uruguayan Football Associations to participate in the Tie Cup, played by teams of Buenos Aires, Rosario and Montevideo. Rosario AC won the 1902 (defeating legendary Alumni by 2–1 in the playoff match), 1904 (beating Uruguayan CURCC 3–2) and 1905 (winning over CURCC again by 4–3) editions totaling 3 championships in 6 years. The line-up vs. CURCC in 1905 was: ER.S. Knight; R.O. Le Bas, G. Middleton; H. Talbot, M.O. Wells, R. Stuart; E.O. Le Bas, A.O Le Bas, G. Roberts, J.G. Parr, W. Stocks. Rosario AC was also a founding member of "Liga Rosarina de Football", playing all its tournaments until 1916.

Apart from football, Rosario AC had an active participation in rugby union. On 28 June 1886 Rosario AC played the first inter-clubs match in Argentina, when the team faced Buenos Aires Football Club in the city of Rosario.

Thirteen years later, in 1899, along with Buenos Aires FC, Lomas and Belgrano AC, the club would become a founding member of the "River Plate Rugby Championship", the origin of today's Argentine Rugby Union. Rosario AC's rugby field is considered the oldest in Argentina, having been inaugurated in 1899.

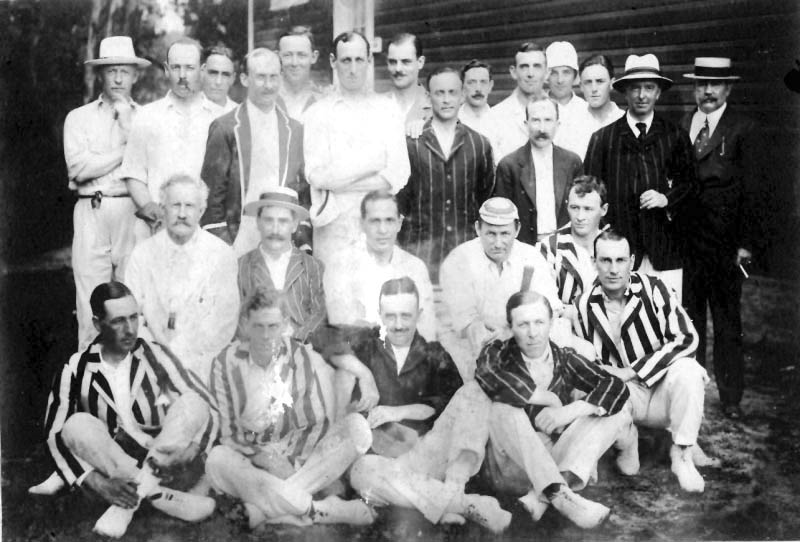
Rosario and Buenos Aires cricket teams posing together in 1916

In late 1916 Rosario Athletic closed its football section. The reasons for that decision remain unclear to present. (Note: There are two theories about this. The Asociación Rosarina de Fútbol states that the club left football due to its teams had been dismantled. Another view by football historian Oscar Barnade states that CAR left football after a riot between supporters of Rosario Central and Newell's Old Boys in Plaza Jewell in 1917.)

In 1928 Atlético del Rosario, then playing in the Unión de Rugby de Buenos Aires championship, became a founding member of the Unión de Rugby de Rosario. As a founding member of the URBA and the URR, the club has the particularity of being a full member of both unions to this day. Field hockey was added as a sport in 1930, being played by women's teams and first. In 1955 the team started to play in the tournaments held by "Asociación Argentina Amateur de Hockey Sobre Césped", promoting to Primera División in 1959. The club won two championships in 1975 and 1978 but in 1991 it was relegated to the second division.

From 1956, Atlético would only take part in the local competitions, before rejoining URBA competitions in 1983. When playing in the URBA, the team uses CA San Isidro's home ground in San Isidro, Buenos Aires, in order to facilitate travel for the visiting teams. In 1991 Atlético was relegated to the second division, where it played the 1992 season promoting to Grupo I that same year. In 1994, Atlético del Rosario took part in the creation of Unión de Rugby de Buenos Aires, which organized its own championships succeeding The River Plate Rugby Union. One year later Atlético won its four Primera División title, shared with Hindú Club. In 2000 the club won its 5th title and last to date, defeating CA San Isidro at the finals.

In 2016, Atlético del Rosario reintroduced the practice of football in the club (more than 100 years after the sport had been abandoned), with the organization of internal tournaments.

Atlético del Rosario returned to the top division of rugby in 2025 after being runner-up of Primera A.

== Uniforms ==
Football (1905)	Football (–1917)	Rugby	Field hockey

== Honours ==
=== Football ===
- Tie Cup (3): 1902, 1904, 1905

=== Rugby union ===
- Torneo de la URBA (5): 1905, 1906, 1935, 1996, 2000
- Torneo del Litoral (27): 1929, 1930, 1932, 1933, 1936, 1949, 1950, 1951, 1957, 1961, 1962, 1965, 1967, 1970, 1973, 1974, 1975, 1976, 1977, 1978, 1979, 1980, 1981, 1982, 1983, 1984, 1985

=== Field hockey ===
Women's

- Metropolitano de Primera División (2): 1971, 1975

== Institutions founded ==
Beyond its sporting achievements, Atlético del Rosario is regarded as a founding member of many sports bodies in Argentina, they are:

- Cricket North & South (1891)
- Amateur Athletic Association of the River Plate (1892)
- Rosario Association Football League (1896)
- Argentine Rugby Union (1899) (Note: Founded as "The River Plate Rugby Union")
- Liga Rosarina de Football (1905)
- Argentine Cricket Association (1913)
- Argentine Tennis Association (1914) (Note: Founded as "The Lawn Tennis of the River Plate")
- Santa Fe Tennis Federation (1922)
- Rosario Rugby Union (1928) (Note: Founded as "Santa Fe Rugby Union")
- Santa Fe Swimming Federation (1933)
- Rosario Swimming Federation (1956)
- Litoral Field Hockey Association (1966)
- Rosario Tennis Association (1994)
- Buenos Aires Rugby Union (1995)
