= 1906 Argentine Primera División final =

1906 Primera División final
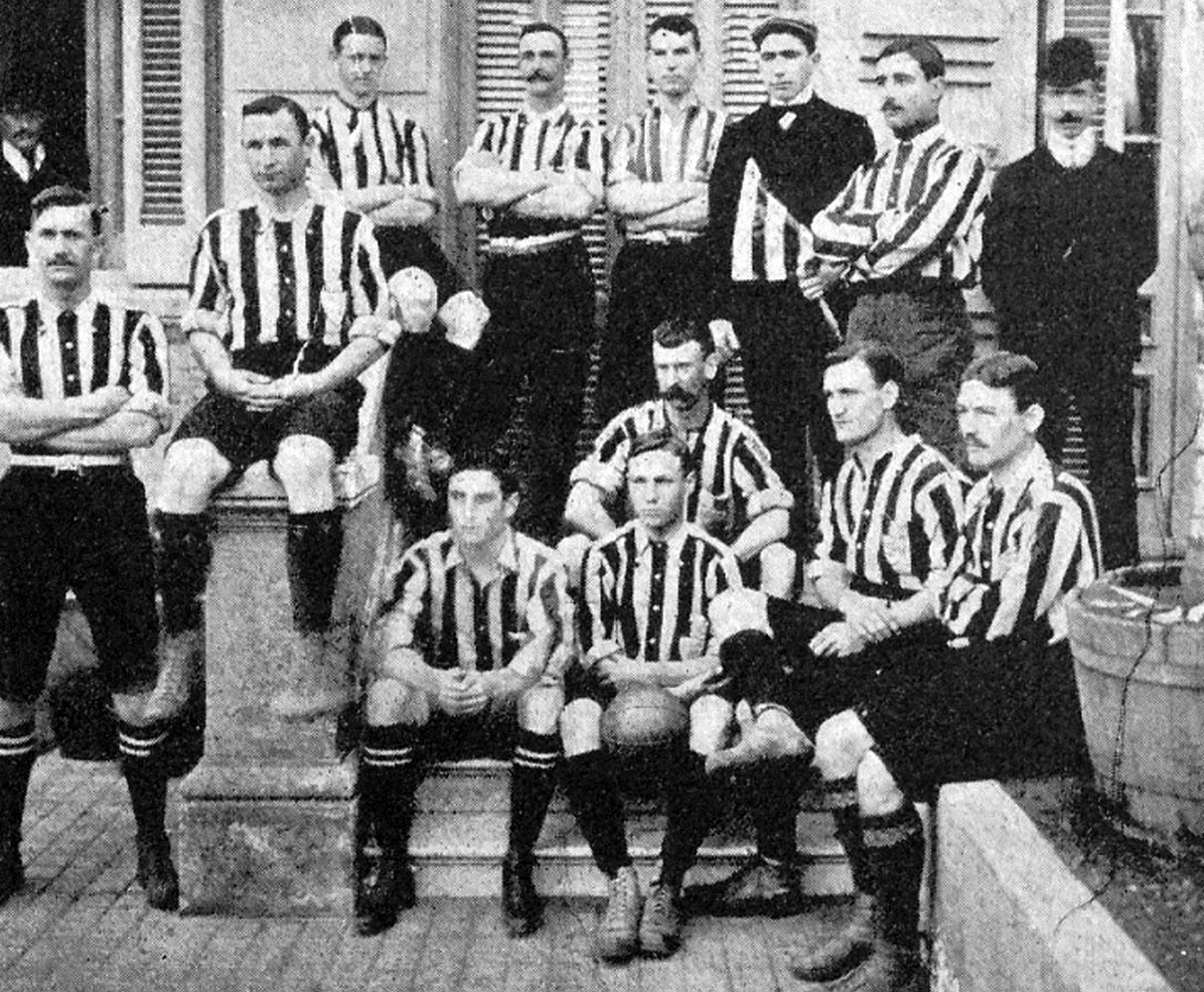
- A team of Alumni, champions
- Event: 1906 Primera División
Alumni	Lomas
4	0
- Date: 7 October 1906
- Venue: C.A. Porteño Stadium, Buenos Aires

The 1906 Argentine Primera División final was the playoff that determined the winner of 1906 season of Argentine Primera División. It was contested by Alumni and Lomas Athletic Club (winners of groups B and A respectively), in order to decide a champion.

It was the first league final contested by Alumni while Lomas played their second final since 1897 when they had won the championship after beating Lanús A.C. after three games.

Alumni easily defeated Lomas 4–0 to win their 6th league title.

== Qualified teams ==
Team	Previous finals app.
Alumni	(none)
Lomas	**1897**

Bold indicates winning years

== Venue ==
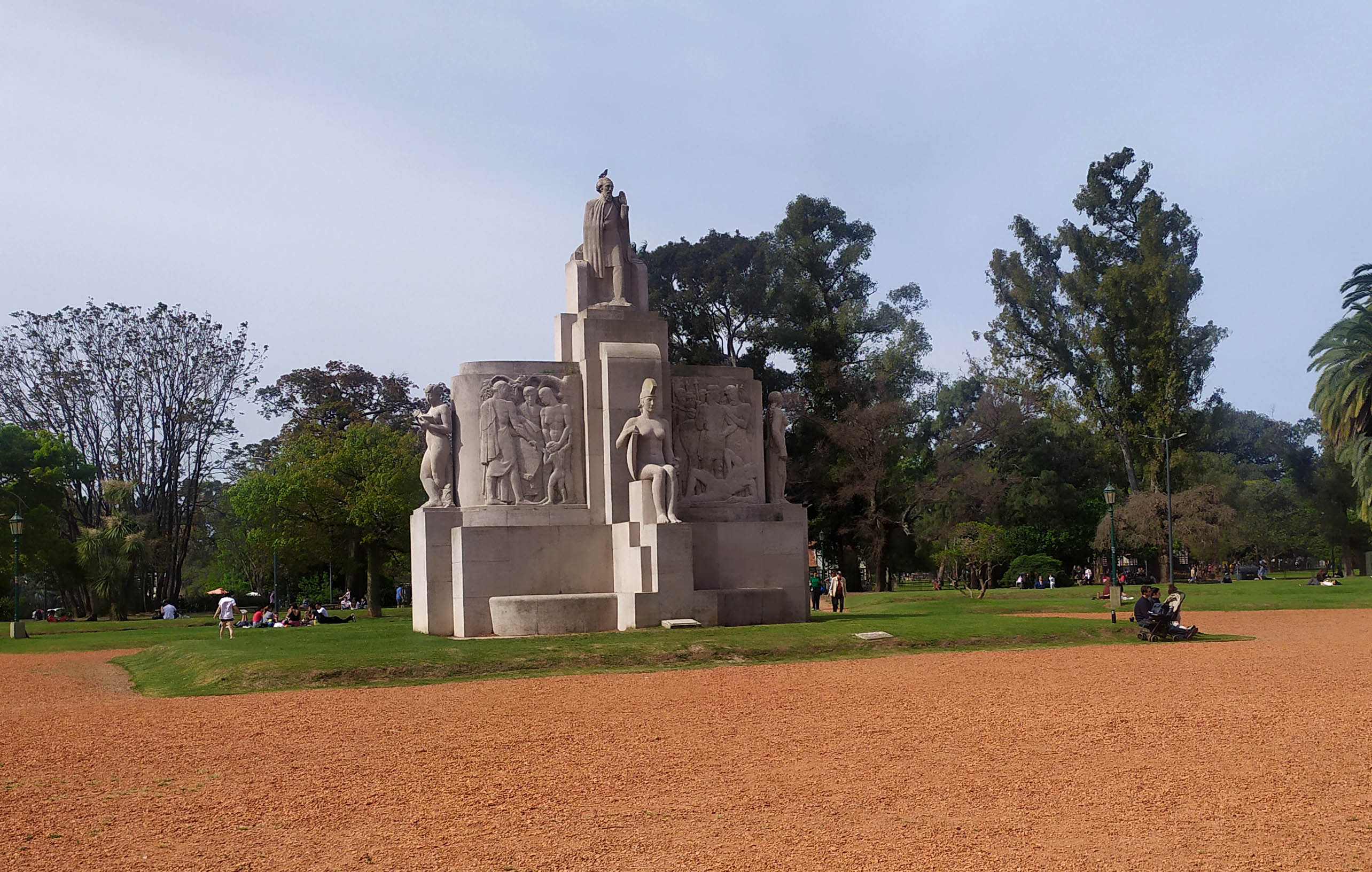
Plaza Holanda of Parque 3 de Febrero. C.A. Porteño stadium was located there

The match was held in the Club Atlético Porteño Stadium, which was the club's first playing field since 1901. It was located at Parque Tres de Febrero in Palermo, Buenos Aires, more precisely on Av. Alvear (now Avenida del Libertador) and Godoy Cruz. The stadium was later demolished to build the industrial pavilion for an exhibition that took part as part of the Centennial of Argentina celebrations of 1910.

The club then rented a field in the same neighborhood, on a land located next to Hipódromo Argentino and the Golf station (nowadays "Lisandro de la Torre" station) of Central Argentine Railway. The field was also known as the Golf. The club remained there until 1945.

Porteño then established its headquarters in the city of San Vicente in Buenos Aires Province, where it has remained since 1971.

== Background ==
Teams participating in the 1906 championship were divided into two zones, where they played each other in a double round-robin tournament which qualified the best placed teams of each zone to the final. Lomas won the group A earning 15 points, totalising 7 wins, 1 draw, and 2 losses. On the other hand, Alumni won the group B with 14 points, totalising 7 wins, and a loss.

Some of the highlighted matches of Alumni included wins over Belgrano Extra (5–1 and 9–0), Belgrano A.C. (3–0, and 4–1), while the only defeat was against Quilmes (2–4, although Alumni won 4–0 in second round).

In the case of Lomas, the team's most notable wins were over Barracas A.C. (4–0 and 6–1). The team was also defeated by Reformer (3–5), and San Martín A.C. (0–3).

== Match details ==
1906 Argentine Primera División Final
7 October 1906

Alumni	4–0	Lomas
Lett 24'; Eliseo Brown 35', 43'; Campbell 80' (o.g.)	Report

C.A. Porteño Stadium, Buenos Aires
Referee: W. A. Jordan

**Alumni**
**Lomas**

GK	(Argentina) José Buruca Laforia
DF	(Argentina) Juan Domingo Brown
DF	(Argentina) Jorge Brown
MF	(Australia) Andrés Mack
MF	(Argentina) Carlos Buchanan
MF	(Argentina) Patricio Barron Browne
FW	(Argentina) Gottlob Eduardo Weiss
FW	(Argentina) Carlos Lett
FW	(Argentina) Arnold Watson Hutton
FW	(Argentina) Ernesto Brown
FW	(Argentina) Eliseo Brown

GK	R. E. Green
DF	R. Walker
DF	Jack B. Campbell
MF	O. Saint J. Gebbie
MF	(Scotland) William Stirling
MF	O. W. Pfeiffer
FW	Roberto Cotman
FW	Duncan H. Cotman
FW	G. E. Evans
FW	Arturo Jacobs
FW	J. Henry Lawrie

=== Aftermath ===
The final was the first played by two of the teams which are considered predecessors of football in Argentina. Lomas is often regarded as the first great football team of Argentina, having won six consecutive titles between 1893 and 1898.

On the other hand, Alumni consolidated as a natural successor to Lomas A.C., becoming the most successful team of Argentine football with 22 titles (10 leagues, 5 national cups, and 7 international cups) won until the team retired from competitions in 1911.

Despite their legacy of greatness, none of them remain active in football. Alumni was officially dissolved in 1913, although former Alumni players would occasionally reunite to play exhibition matches. As for Lomas, the team disaffiliated from the Argentine Football Association in 1909, and the club abandoned the practise of the sport. Subsecquently Lomas consolidated in other sporting activities such as women's field hockey, where the senior squad became the most winning team in Argentina.
