= All-time Argentine Primera División table =

Argentine football league statistics

The All-time Argentine Primera División table is a cumulative record of all match results, points and goals of every team that has played in the Argentine association football top division since the first championship held in 1891.

This table does not include other Argentine competitions such as domestic cups.

== Positions ==
Updated as of 22 Nov, 2020

Teams in italics are currently playing in lower divisions.

Pos.	Club	Pts. (Note: Until the 1994–95 season, two points were awarded by game won. From the 1995–96 season, this number increased to three points awarded.)	Pld.	W	W2	W3	D	L	% W	% D	% L	First	Tit.
1	River Plate	5425	3804	2016	1575	441	952	836	53	25	22	1909	36
2	Boca Juniors	5242	3689	1912	1428	484	934	843	52	25	23	1913	34
3	San Lorenzo	4798	3677	1698	1284	414	988	991	46	27	27	1915	15
4	Independiente	4765	3735	1702	1362	340	1021	1012	46	27	27	1912	16
5	Racing	4609	3662	1624	1266	358	1003	1035	44	27	28	1911	18
6	Vélez Sarsfield	4276	3531	1447	1046	401	981	1103	41	28	31	1919	10
7	Estudiantes (LP)	4229	3624	1443	1074	369	974	1207	40	27	33	1912	6
8	Gimnasia y Esgrima (LP)	3461	3219	1135	832	303	888	1196	35	28	37	1916	1
9	Huracán	3421	3157	1222	1062	160	817	1118	39	26	35	1914	5
10	Newell's Old Boys	3350	2936	1060	737	323	907	969	36	31	33	1939	6
11	Rosario Central	3116	2800	997	717	280	842	961	36	30	34	1939	4
12	Lanús	2836	2606	876	508	368	716	1014	34	27	39	1920	2
13	Argentinos Juniors	2793	2744	857	614	243	836	1051	31	30	38	1922	3
14	Ferro Carril Oeste	2603	2788	861	810	51	830	1097	31	30	39	1913	2
15	Banfield	2390	2324	761	541	220	648	915	33	28	39	1897	1
16	Platense	2375	2467	800	748	52	723	944	32	29	38	1913	0
17	Chacarita Juniors	1976	2090	681	612	69	545	864	33	26	41	1925	1
18	Colón	1813	1575	522	229	293	476	577	33	30	37	1966	0
19	Atlanta	1737	2041	617	617	0	503	921	30	25	45	1912	0
20	Quilmes	1610	1765	545	447	98	422	798	31	24	45	1893 (Note: A team named "Quilmes Rovers" took part of that championship. As the club settled on 5 November 1887 as the date of its foundation, considering "Quilmes and Polo Club" (then named "Quilmes Rovers A.C.") as its predecessor. Nevertheless, Argentine football historian Jorge Gallego stated that the original institution founded in 1887 was dissolved and the current club was founded on 5 November 1897 as "Quilmes Cricket Club". According to his version, this club was not related with any other institution previously founded in the city of Quilmes. Other sources affirm that reverend J.T. Stevenson (recognised as founder of "Quilmes C.C.") arrived in Argentina in 1895, taking part in the meeting of 1897 when the QCC was established. Therefore, the date of foundation is still disputed.)	2
21	Tigre	1481	1627	484	343	141	372	771	30	23	47	1913	0
22	Unión	1436	1373	417	278	139	463	493	30	34	36	1967	0
23	Talleres (C)	1240	1102	382	239	143	333	387	35	30	35	1969	0
24	Belgrano (C)	912	797	249	101	148	266	282	31	33	35	1968	0
25	Arsenal	792	601	204	0	204	180	217	34	30	36	2002	1
26	All Boys	604	666	181	135	46	196	289	27	29	43	1923	0
27	Godoy Cruz	593	457	160	3	157	116	181	35	25	40	1974	0
28	Estudiantes (BA)	591	723	219	219	0	153	351	30	21	49	1904	0
29	Dep. Español	566	557	172	134	38	184	201	31	33	36	1967	0
30	Instituto	548	566	172	136	36	168	226	30	30	40	1973	0
