= Charles Dickinson (footballer) =

Argentine footballer (1881–1955)

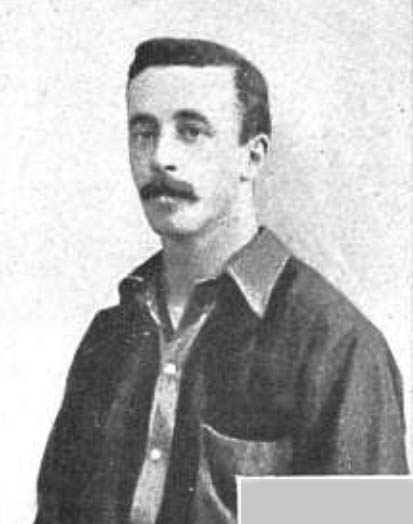

Personal information
- Full name: Carlos Edgard Dickinson
- Date of birth: 5 May 1881
- Place of birth: Buenos Aires, Argentina
- Date of death: 20 April 1955 (aged 73)
- Place of death: Buenos Aires, Argentina
- Position: Midfielder

Senior career*
Years	Team	Apps	(Gls)
1890–1910	Belgrano A.C.		
- * Club domestic league appearances and goals

Carlos Dickinson or Charles Dickinson (1881–1955) was an Argentine footballer, who played as midfielder in Belgrano Athletic Club and the Argentina national football team. Dickinson won seven titles with Belgrano.

== Career ==
Dickinson was born in Buenos Aires, son of a family of British origin. He began his career Belgrano, club where he won the championships of 1899, 1904 and 1908.

Charles Dickinson participated in the first official match of Argentina team against the Uruguay, marking the first goal of the victory of the Argentina team by 6–0.

== Titles ==
Belgrano Athletic Club

- Primera División (4): 1899, 1900, 1904, 1908
- Copa de Honor Municipalidad de Buenos Aires (1): 1907
- Tie Cup (1): 1900
- Copa de Honor Cousenier (1): 1907
