= Maximiliano Susan =

Argentinian footballer (1888–1965)

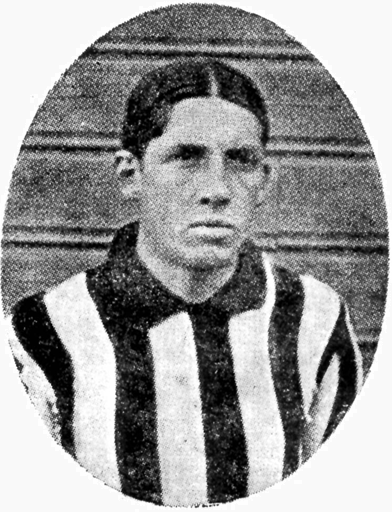
- Susan with Estudiantes de Buenos Aires

Personal information
- Date of birth: 19 June 1888
- Place of birth: Buenos Aires
- Date of death: 26 February 1965 (aged 76)
- Place of death: Heado

Youth career
- 1904: Estudiantil Porteño
- 1905: Argentino (R)
- 1905: San Isidro

Senior career*
Years	Team	Apps	(Gls)
1906–1920	Estudiantes (BA)		(109)

International career
1908–1913	Argentina	22	(8)
- * Club domestic league appearances and goals

Maximiliano Susan (19 June 1888 – 26 February 1965) was an Argentine footballer who played as forward (and sometimes as right or left wing). Consolidated as one of the biggest scorers of Argentina during the early 20th century, Susán played his entire senior career for Estudiantes de Buenos Aires, where he is regarded as one of the greatest players in the club's history. With that club he won the 1910 Copa de Competencia Jockey Club, the only title of Estudiantes in top national competitions.

At international level, Susan played for the Argentinian national team, debuting in 1908. He played a total of 22 games for Argentina, scoring 8 goals. His brother José Claudio was also a footballer, being his teammate in Estudiantes.

== Career ==
Susan was born in Buenos Aires and began his youth career in 1904 in Estudiantil Porteño, playing in the 4th and 3rd. divisions of the club until he moved to Rosario to play for Club Argentino one year later, soon returning to play for San Isidro's 4th. division. Susan started his senior career in 1906 when he joined Estudiantes de Buenos Aires, which had recently promoted to Primera División. Susan's debut in Primera was on 24 May 1906 v San Martín A.C. (Estudiantes lost 4–2 and Susan scored his first official goal). Susan was one of the key players of Estudiantes in the 1907 season when the team was runner-up to Alumni, also achieving their best campaign in Primera División. That same year Susan (who had started studying at the University of Buenos Aires) moved to Córdoba to continue his studies there because of a conflict in the Buenos Aires University seat. In Córdoba, Susan joined the Escuela de Agronomía team and then the university team that participated in regional "Liga Cordobesa".

The following year Susan scored 15 goals in 16 matches, ranking third among the top scorers of the season after Eliseo Brown with 19.

Susán consolidated himself as a prominent footballer in 1908 when he scored 18 goals in 17 matches, being called up for the Argentina national team that toured on Brazil. Susan made great performances, scoring 6 goals in 6 matches.

Susan broke his own records in 1909, when he scored 33 goals in 23 matches with Estudiantes. On 25 May 1909, Susan became the player with the record of goals scored in a game (which still stands) after scoring 12 goals (the last 7 consecutively) for Estudiantes in the 18–0 win over Lomas A.C. at the 1909 Copa Competencia Jockey Club. The match was held in the Estudiantes field located on Avenida del Libertador and Oro street in Palermo. That was the largest defeat suffered by an Argentine football team to date (including professional era). But it was also the last day Lomas played football officially. On 10 June, Susan played for Alumni v English side Everton during their tour on South America. Susan left his place as spectator to replace Gottlob Weiss who can't be in time for the match.

Estudiantes became the first Argentine team to tour on Brazil in 1910, but Susan was not part of the team so he travelled to Chile with the Argentina national team. Susan scored 4 goals in 4 matches. Susán made his third tour with Argentina in September 1912 being part of the team that went to Brazil. Susan scored 7 goals in 7 matches. That same year, Susan graduated as veterinary.

One of the matches of the 1912 tour was against a Rio de Janeiro combined (named themselves "Brazil", as most of the regional representatives by then) (Note: before the CBF was established – between the Argentina national team and diverse representatives (named themselves "Brazil"), such as Liga Paulista and Liga Carioca combined, or clubs (Paulistano, SC Americano), among others.) At the end of the first half, Argentina was leading the score 3–0. Former President of Argentina Julio Argentino Roca went to the change room and tried to persuade the Argentine players to let Brazil win alleging diplomatic and commercial reasons. Nevertheless, the footballers did not pay attention to him and in the second half Argentina scored two goals else for a decisive 5–0 win.

Roca came to the change room, he was upsed and told us "boys, we need to be more diplomatic, Brazil is celebrating the Grito de Ipiranga so it's not fair if they lose the match... we should let them win, do it for the peace of América, boys"... after that, we won the match 5–0.

— Susan about the incident with Julio Roca

On 15 August 1913, Susan scored 4 goals to Uruguay in Copa Lipton, becoming the first player to have scored four goals for Argentina.

Susan retired from football in 1916 at 28 years old. Nevertheless, he continued linked to the sport working at the referee committee although he left his charge in 1941 alleging corruption in the body. In 1942 was elected mayor of Morón Partido although his tenure was short.

Susan died in Haedo, Buenos Aires, in 1965.

== Honours ==
Estudiantes

- Copa de Competencia Jockey Club: 1910
