= 1905 Argentine Primera División =

14th season of top-tier football league in Argentina

Primera División
- Season: 1905
- Champions: Alumni (5th title)
- Promoted: Reformer
- Relegated: (none)
- Matches played: 43
- Top goalscorer: Tristán González (Estudiantes BA); Carlos Lett (Alumni) (12 goals each)
- Biggest home win: Alumni 14–0 Reformer
- Biggest away win: Barracas A.C. 1–12 Reformer

The 1905 Argentine Primera División was the 14th season of top-flight football in Argentina. The season began on May 7 and ended on September 24 The 1905 championship was expanded to include 7 teams, who played in a league format, with each team playing the other twice.

Alumni was the champion, winning its 5th league title in six seasons. The squad won the tournament after a 1–1 draw v. Estudiantes de Buenos Aires, one fixture before the end of the season. The line-up for that match was: José Buruca Laforia; Carlos Carr Brown, Jorge Gibson Brown; Andrés Mack, Patricio Barron Browne, Ernesto Brown; Gottlob Eduardo Weiss, Juan J. Moore, Alfredo Brown, Eliseo Brown, Eugenio Moore.

A new team, Reformer, from the city of Campana, registered to play the tournament. The team made a poor campaign, finishing the season with 60 goals conceded in 12 matches played.

== Final standings ==
Pos	Team	Pld	W	D	L	GF	GA	GD	Pts
1	Alumni (C)	12	10	1	1	43	8	+35	21
2	Belgrano A.C.	12	9	0	3	31	12	+19	18
3	Estudiantes (BA)	12	8	1	3	36	18	+18	17
4	Quilmes	12	6	0	6	32	15	+17	12
5	Reformer	12	3	1	8	20	60	−40	7
6	Lomas	12	3	1	8	12	41	−29	7
7	Barracas A.C.	12	1	0	11	8	28	−20	2

(C) Champions
