= 1903 Argentine Primera División =

12th season of top-tier football league in Argentina

Primera División
- Season: 1903
- Champions: Alumni (4th title)
- Promoted: Flores
- Matches played: 30
- Goals scored: 116 (3.87 per match)
- Top goalscorer: (Argentina) Jorge Brown (Alumni) (12 goals)
- Biggest home win: Alumni 6–0 Flores
- Biggest away win: Flores 0–12 Barracas A.C.

The 1903 Argentine Primera División was the 12th season of top-flight football in Argentina. The season began on April 26 and ended on August 9.

Alumni won its fourth consecutive league championship. On 26 July 1903 the squad lost its first league game in four years. Flores A.C., which had left the Association in 1898, returned to the competition under the name "Club Atlético de Flores".

The championship was expanded to a 6 team league format in 1903, with each team playing the other twice. In February 1903, the association changed its name from "The Argentine Association Football League" to "Argentine Football Association"

== Final standings ==
Pos	Team	Pld	W	D	L	GF	GA	GD	Pts
1	Alumni (C)	10	9	0	1	40	4	+36	18
2	Belgrano A.C.	10	7	1	2	21	11	+10	15
3	Barracas A.C.	10	5	1	4	22	13	+9	11
4	Lomas	10	2	4	4	17	17	0	8
5	Quilmes	10	3	2	5	14	22	−8	8
6	Flores	10	0	0	10	2	49	−47	0

(C) Champions
