= 1910 Argentine Primera División =

19th season of top-tier football league in Argentina

Primera División
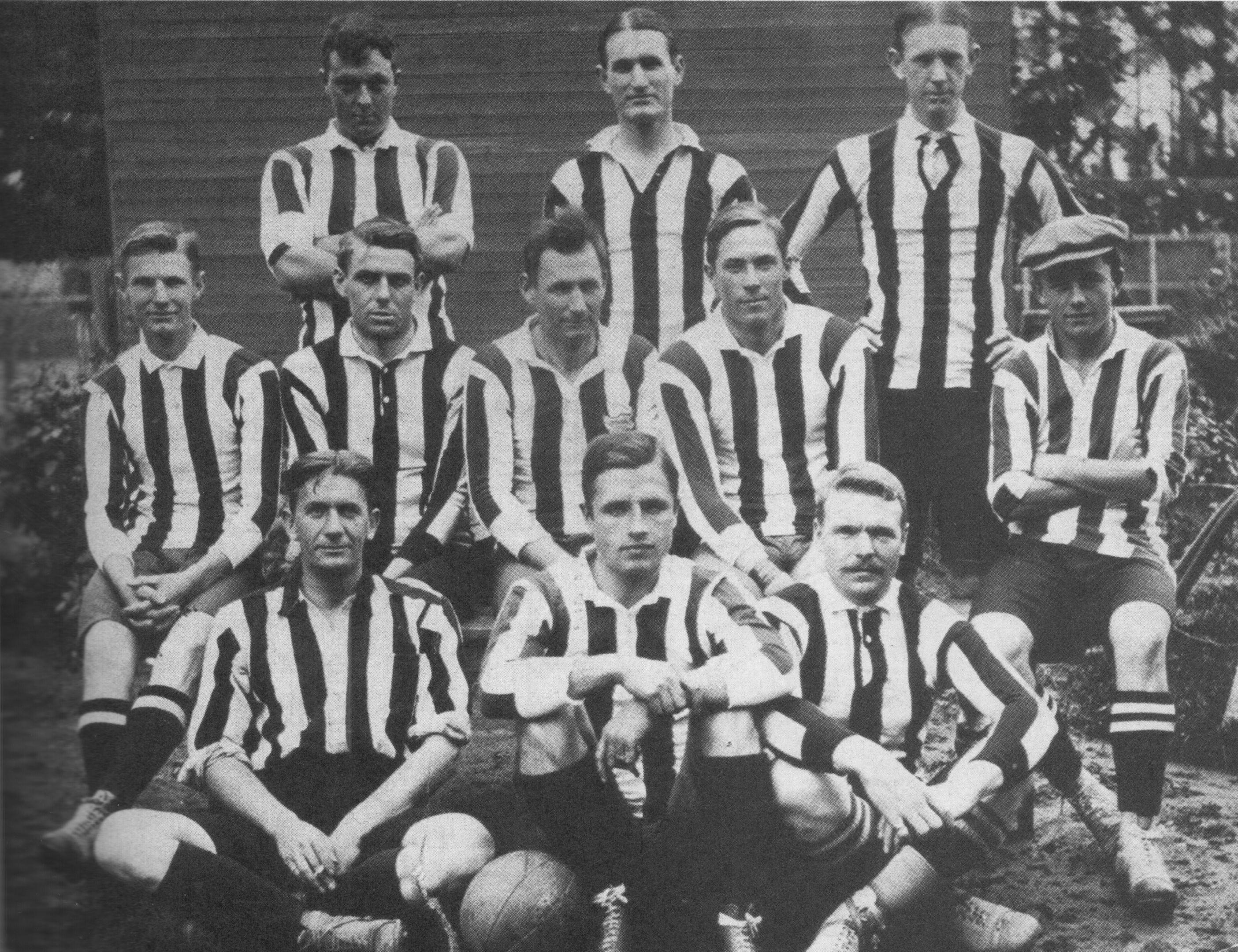
- Alumni, champions
- Season: 1910
- Champions: Alumni (9th title)
- Promoted: Gim. y Esgrima (BA)
- Relegated: Argentino (Q)
- Matches played: 74
- Top goalscorer: (Argentina) A. W. Hutton (9 goals)
- Biggest home win: Alumni 6–0 Gim. y Esg. (BA) –
- Biggest away win: Argentino (Q) 1–7 Gim. y Esg. (BA)

The 1910 Argentine Primera División was the 19th season of top-flight football in Argentina. The season began on April 24 and ended in December. The championship was reduced from 10 to 9 teams, with each team playing the other twice.

Gimnasia y Esgrima de Buenos Aires (promoted last year) made its debut at the top division while Argentino de Quilmes was relegated to Segunda División.

Alumni won its 9th title in 11 seasons.

== Final table ==
Pos	Team	Pld	W	D	L	GF	GA	GD	Pts
1	Alumni (C)	16	10	5	1	42	13	+29	25
2	Porteño	16	8	5	3	33	25	+8	21
3	Belgrano A.C.	16	8	3	5	42	24	+18	19
4	Estudiantes (BA)	16	8	3	5	33	29	+4	19
5	San Isidro	16	6	6	4	30	27	+3	18
6	Gimnasia y Esgrima (BA)	16	5	5	6	29	25	+4	15
7	River Plate	16	4	4	8	27	37	−10	12
8	Quilmes	16	2	4	10	24	52	−28	8
9	Argentino (Q) (R)	16	2	3	11	21	49	−28	7

(C) Champions; (R) Relegated
