= 1902 Argentine Primera División =

11th season of top-tier football league in Argentina

Primera División
- Season: 1902
- Champions: Alumni (3rd title)
- Promoted: Barracas A.C.
- Relegated: (none)
- Matches played: 17
- Goals scored: 52 (3.06 per match)
- Top goalscorer: (Argentina) Jorge Brown (Alumni) (11 goals)
- Biggest home win: Alumni 10–0 Belgrano A.C.

The 1902 Argentine Primera División was the 11th season of top-flight football in Argentina. Alumni won its 3rd consecutive league championship. Barracas A.C. (promoted in 1901) added to the tournament.

The first division championship was expanded to a 5-team league format, with each team playing the other twice. The tournament started on May 11 and ended on September 21. There were not relegations.

== Final standings ==
| Pos | Team | Pld | W | D | L | GF | GA | GD | Pts |
|---|---|---|---|---|---|---|---|---|---|
| 1 | Alumni (C) | 8 | 7 | 1 | 0 | 24 | 3 | +21 | 15 |
| 2 | Barracas A.C. | 8 | 5 | 0 | 3 | 12 | 13 | −1 | 10 |
| 3 | Quilmes | 8 | 3 | 1 | 4 | 6 | 6 | 0 | 7 |
| 4 | Belgrano A.C. | 8 | 1 | 3 | 4 | 17 | 20 | −3 | 5 |
| 5 | Lomas | 8 | 1 | 1 | 6 | 3 | 10 | −7 | 3 |

(C) Champions
