= 1906 Argentine Primera División =

15th season of top-tier football league in Argentina

Primera División
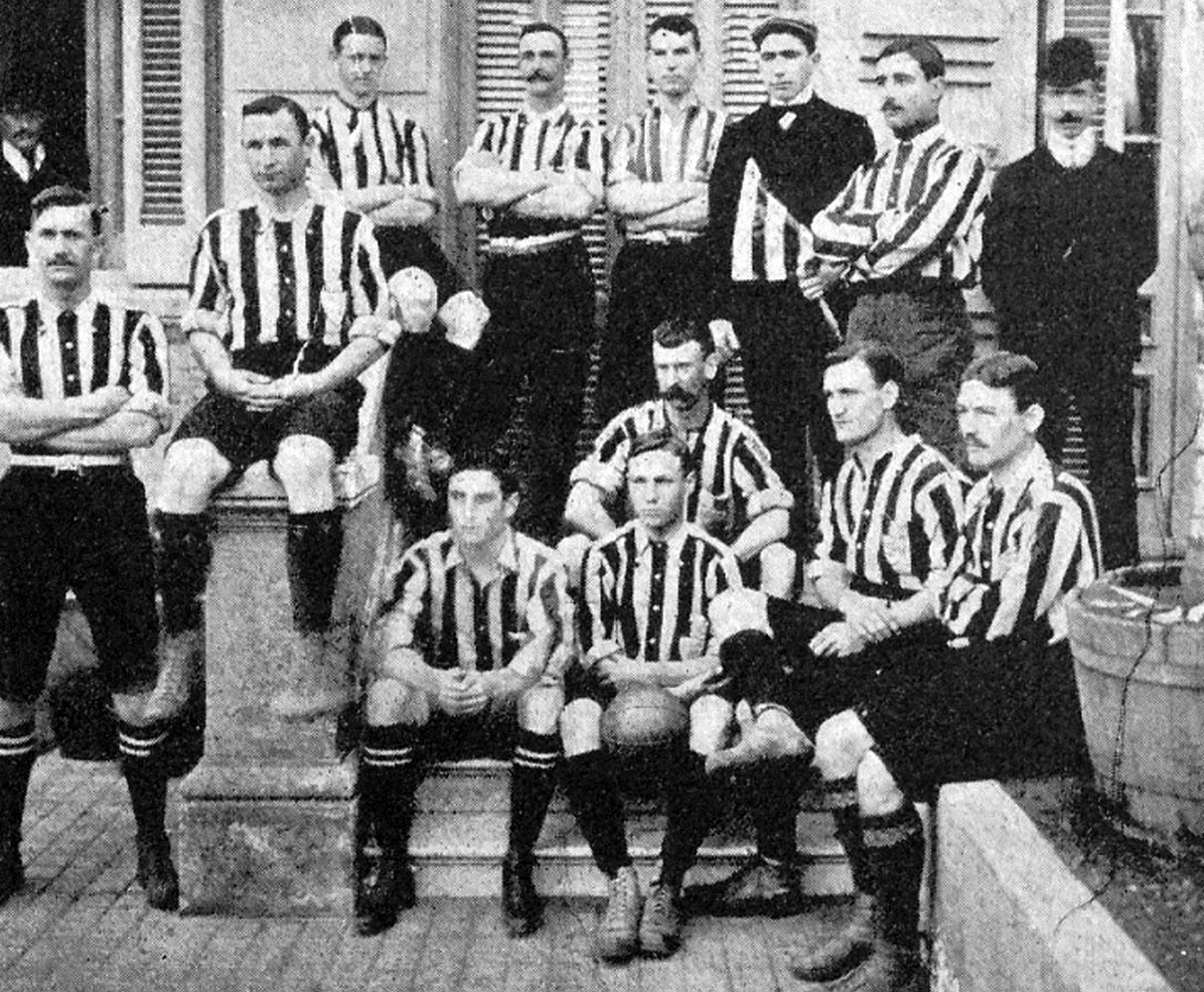
- Alumni, champion
- Season: 1906
- Dates: 29 April – 7 October
- Champions: Alumni (6th title)
- Promoted: San Isidro; Argentino (Q); San Martín A.C. Belgrano Extra
- Relegated: (none)
- Matches played: 51
- Goals scored: 215 (4.22 per match)
- Top goalscorer: (Argentina) Eliseo Brown (Alumni) (England) Percy Hooton (Quilmes) (Argentina) Henry Lawrie (Lomas) (South Africa) Carlos Whalley (Belgrano A.C.) (8 goals each)
- Biggest home win: Reformer 11–0 Barracas A.C.
- Biggest away win: Belgrano Extra 1–5 Alumni

The 1906 Argentine Primera División was the 15th season of top-flight football in Argentina. The 1906 championship was expanded to include 11 teams. The teams were split into two groups with each team playing the others in their group twice. The two group winners played in a championship decider.

The season began on April 29 and ended on October 7. San Isidro, Argentino de Quilmes and San Martín A.C. (from the homonymous city) made their debuts in Primera. Belgrano A.C. also registered a "B" team (named "Belgrano Extra") to play the tournament. Alumni regaining the Argentine championship for the 6th time in seven seasons.

== Final tables ==
=== Group A ===
Pos	Team	Pld	W	D	L	GF	GA	GD	Pts
1	Lomas	10	7	1	2	23	14	+9	15
2	San Martín A.C.	10	5	2	3	17	9	+8	12
3	Estudiantes (BA)	10	6	0	4	22	19	+3	12
4	San Isidro	10	5	0	5	23	22	+1	10
5	Reformer	10	4	0	6	30	22	+8	8
6	Barracas A.C.	10	1	1	8	8	37	−29	1 (Note: 2 points deducted)

=== Group B ===
Pos	Team	Pld	W	D	L	GF	GA	GD	Pts
1	Alumni (C)	8	7	0	1	28	6	+22	14
2	Quilmes	8	6	0	2	26	13	+13	12
3	Belgrano A.C.	8	5	0	3	23	15	+8	10
4	Argentino (Q)	8	1	0	7	5	19	−14	2
5	Belgrano Extra	8	1	0	7	9	38	−29	2

(C) Champions

=== Championship final ===
Date	Team 1	Res.	Team 2	Venue	City
7 Oct	Alumni	4–0	Lomas	Estadio C.A. Porteño	Buenos Aires
