= 1907 Argentine Primera División =

16th season of top-tier football league in Argentina

Primera División
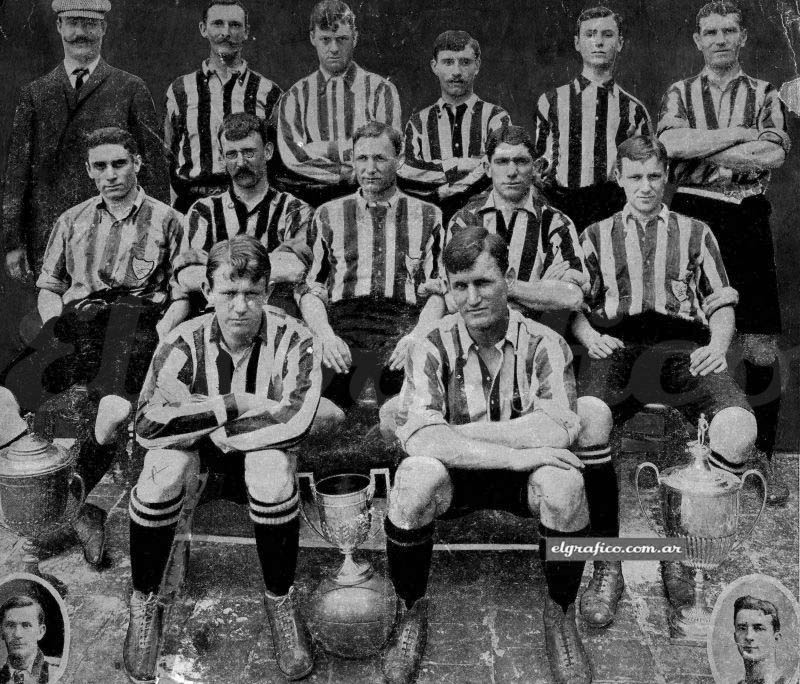
- Alumni, champion
- Season: 1907
- Champions: Alumni (7th title)
- Promoted: Porteño
- Relegated: Barracas A.C.
- Matches played: 111
- Top goalscorer: (Argentina) Eliseo Brown (24 goals)
- Biggest home win: Barracas A.C. 9–1 San Martín A.C.
- Biggest away win: Quilmes 2–7 Alumni

The 1907 Argentine Primera División was the 16th season of top-flight football in Argentina. The season began on April 21 and ended on November 11. The 1907 championship featured eleven teams, with each team playing the other twice.

Alumni regained the championship winning its 7th first division title in eight seasons. The squad crowned champion after thrashing San Isidro by 5-1 at Ferro C. Oeste stadium. The line-up for that match was: T. Duncan; Juan Domingo Brown, Jorge Gibson Brown; Guillermo R. Ross, Carlos Lett, Ernesto Brown; Gottlob Eduardo Weiss, Alfredo Brown, Juan Brown, Eliseo Brown, J. Henry Lawrie.

The relegation system was established since this tournament. Barracas A.C. withdrew after 7 fixtures and was disaffiliated by the Association.

== Final standings ==
Pos	Team	Pld	W	D	L	GF	GA	GD	Pts
1	Alumni (C)	20	17	3	0	76	13	+63	37
2	Estudiantes (BA)	20	13	5	2	51	25	+26	31
3	San Isidro	20	11	3	6	51	31	+20	25
4	Quilmes	20	11	2	7	44	31	+13	24
5	Belgrano A.C.	20	10	3	7	26	26	0	23
6	Porteño	20	8	6	6	42	41	+1	22
7	Reformer	20	8	1	11	36	53	−17	17
8	Argentino (Q)	20	6	4	10	23	50	−27	16
9	Lomas	20	4	3	13	21	50	−29	11
10	San Martín A.C.	20	4	2	14	24	70	−46	10
11	Barracas A.C. (R)	20	2	0	18	17	21	−4	4 (Note: Barracas A.C. withdrew after 7 fixtures and was disaffiliated from the Association.)

(C) Champions; (R) Relegated
