= 1911 Argentine Primera División =

20th season of top-tier football league in Argentina

Primera División
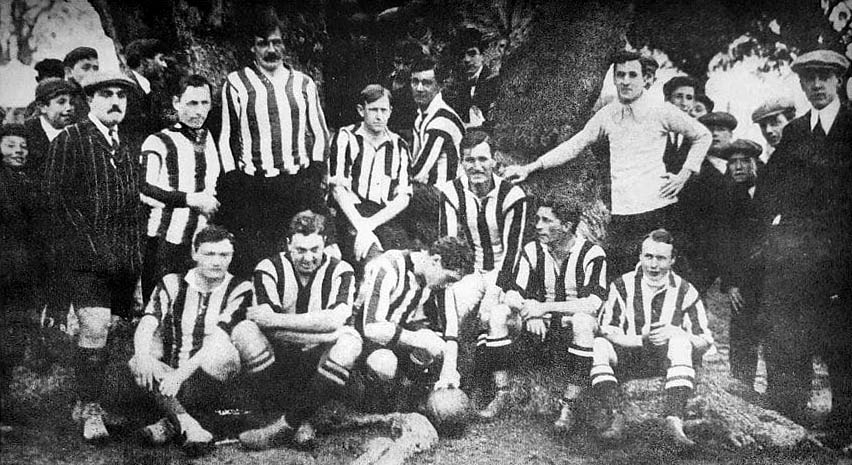
- Alumni, champion
- Season: 1911
- Dates: 30 April – 26 November
- Champions: Alumni (10th title)
- Promoted: Racing Club
- Relegated: (none)
- Matches played: 72
- Top goalscorer: (Argentina) Ricardo Malbrán (Argentina) Ernesto Lett (Argentina) Antonio Piaggio (11 goals each)
- Biggest home win: Alumni 6–0 Estudiantes (BA)
- Biggest away win: Quilmes 0–7 Alumni

The 1911 Argentine Primera División was the 20th season of top-flight football in Argentina. The season began on April 30 and ended on November 26.

The championship featured 9 teams, with each team playing the other twice. Racing Club made its debut.

Alumni regain the championship for the third time in succession, by beating Porteño in a championship playoff. It was the team's 10th title in 12 seasons and was also its last tournament disputed so the football team was disbanded at the end of the season due to financial problems.

== Standings ==
Pos	Team	Pld	W	D	L	GF	GA	GD	Pts
1	Alumni (C)	16	11	1	4	48	15	+33	23
2	Porteño	16	10	3	3	26	12	+14	23
3	San Isidro	16	7	4	5	29	24	+5	18
4	Racing	16	6	5	5	26	24	+2	17
5	River Plate	16	6	4	6	22	31	−9	16
6	Gimnasia y Esgrima (BA)	16	5	4	7	28	31	−3	14
7	Belgrano A.C.	16	4	5	7	23	28	−5	13
8	Estudiantes (BA)	16	2	8	6	20	36	−16	12
9	Quilmes	16	2	4	10	23	43	−20	8

(C) Champions

=== Championship playoff ===
Alumni and Porteño finished level on points at the top of the table, being necessary the dispute of a playoff match, won by Alumni.

Date	Team 1	Res.	Team 2	Venue	City
26 Nov	Alumni	2–1	Porteño	Estadio GEBA	Buenos Aires
