= Arnold Watson Hutton =

Argentine footballer (1886–1951)

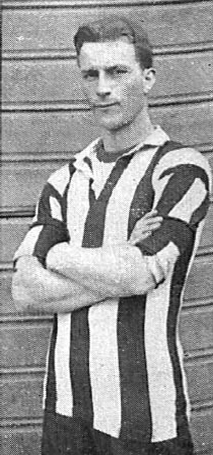

Personal information
- Full name: Arnold Pencliffe Watson Hutton
- Date of birth: 20 August 1886
- Place of birth: Buenos Aires, Argentina
- Date of death: 29 July 1951 (aged 64)
- Place of death: Buenos Aires, Argentina
- Position: Striker

Senior career*
Years	Team	Apps	(Gls)
1902–1911	Alumni		
1911–1914	Belgrano		

International career
1906–1913	Argentina	17	(6)
- * Club domestic league appearances and goals

Arnold Pencliffe Watson Hutton (20 August 1886 – 29 July 1951) was an Argentine footballer who played as a striker for Alumni and Belgrano A.C. As an international, he played for the Argentina national team.

Other sports practised by Hutton representing his country include cricket, tennis and waterpolo.

== Biography ==
Arnold Watson Hutton, known as "Arnoldo" in Argentina, was the son of Alexander Watson Hutton, a Scotsman known as the father of Argentine football for his role in founding the Argentine Football Association and the Alumni A.C. Arnold shared his father's keen interest in sports and made his debut for Alumni on 14 April 1902 at the age of 15.

As a teenager, Watson Hutton travelled to Europe, studying in Scotland and Germany. When he returned to Argentina he was part of the Alumni team that won the Primera División championship in 1906, and he made his debut for the Argentina national team in a Copa Newton match against Uruguay at Sociedad Sportiva. He scored the first goal for the 2–1 victory in a game attended by over 5,000.

Watson Hutton went on to play 17 times for the national side, scoring six goals and winning two international tournaments. In 1910 he was the top scorer in the Argentine league with 13 goals.

He played for Alumni until the club were disbanded in 1911. After the dissolution of Alumni, Watson Hutton moved to rival Belgrano where he continued his career until his retirement from football two years later.

In cricket, he represented Argentina in a single first-class match against the touring Marylebone Cricket Club at Buenos Aires in 1912. He was dismissed without scoring by Morice Bird in the Argentine first innings and was not called upon to bat in their second innings, with Argentina winning the match by 4 wickets.

Watson Hutton, a scrum-half, played in the first ever international contested by the Argentina rugby union team.
