= 1909 Argentine Primera División =

18th season of top-tier football league in Argentina

Primera División
- Season: 1909
- Champions: Alumni (8th title)
- Promoted: River Plate
- Relegated: Reformer; Lomas
- = Tie Cup: Alumni
- Copa de Honor Cousenier: San Isidro
- Matches played: 91
- Top goalscorer: (Argentina) Eliseo Brown (Alumni) (17 goals)
- Biggest home win: Alumni 9–0 San Isidro
- Biggest away win: Argentino (Q) 1–10 Estudiantes (BA)

The 1909 Argentine Primera División was the 18th season of top-flight football in Argentina. The season began on May 2 and ended on November 21. The championship featured 10 teams, with each team playing the other twice.

Alumni won the championship, achieving its 8th title in 10 seasons. River Plate made its debuts at the top division while Lomas and Reformer were relegated, being the first teams in the history of Primera División to be relegated under the new system.

== Final table ==
Pos	Team	Pld	W	D	L	GF	GA	GD	Pts
1	Alumni (C)	18	15	2	1	74	19	+55	32
2	River Plate	18	11	2	5	35	26	+9	24
3	Quilmes	18	8	4	6	36	39	−3	20
4	Estudiantes (BA)	18	8	3	7	40	31	+9	19
5	Belgrano AC	18	6	6	6	36	35	+1	18
6	San Isidro	18	7	3	8	33	27	+6	17
7	Porteño	18	7	2	9	35	39	−4	16
8	Argentino (Q)	18	5	4	9	19	40	−21	14
9	Reformer (R)	18	3	6	9	21	42	−21	12
10	Lomas (R)	18	1	6	11	17	48	−31	8

(C) Champions; (R) Relegated
