= 1900 Argentine Primera División =

9th season of top-tier football league in Argentina

Primera División
- Season: 1900
- Champions: English High School (1st title)
- Promoted: English High School; Quilmes
- Relegated: (none)
- Tie Cup: (all Argentine teams)
- Matches played: 11
- Goals scored: 44 (4 per match)
- Top goalscorer: (England) Spencer Leonard (English H.S.) (8 goals)
- Biggest home win: English H.S. 5–0 Quilmes
- Biggest away win: Quilmes 0–4 English H.S.

The 1900 Primera División was the 9th season of top-flight football in Argentina. The season began on May 20 and ended on September 8.

The title was won by the English High School A.C., after their members joined again to the team to request their affiliation to the Association. Quilmes Rovers also returned under its new name "Quilmes Atlético Club". Both teams replaced Lobos and Lanús Athletic.

The championship continued with the 4 team league format, with each team playing each other twice.

== Final table ==
Pos	Team	Pld	W	D	L	GF	GA	GD	Pts
1	English High School (C)	6	5	1	0	18	3	+15	11
2	Lomas	6	2	1	3	9	9	0	5
3	Belgrano A.C.	6	2	0	4	8	13	−5	4
4	Quilmes	6	2	0	4	9	19	−10	4

(C) Champions
