= 1904 Argentine Primera División =

13th season of top-tier football league in Argentina

Primera División
- Season: 1904
- Champions: Belgrano A.C. (2nd title)
- Promoted: Estudiantes (BA)
- Relegated: (none)
- Matches played: 19
- Goals scored: 90 (4.74 per match)
- Top goalscorer: Alfredo Brown (Alumni) (11 goals)
- Biggest home win: Belgrano A.C. 6–2 Estudiantes (BA)
- Biggest away win: Barracas A.C. 1–5 Alumni

The 1904 Argentine Primera División was the 13th season of top-flight football in Argentina. The season began on May 9 and ended on September 24. The 1904 championship had a 6 team league format, with each team playing the other twice.

Flores did not register to play the tournament after a poor performance in the last season. Estudiantes de Buenos Aires was promoted to Primera by the Association after the good campaigns made in lower divisions and the contribution made by the club to the practice of football.

Belgrano A.C. was the champion, ending a run of four consecutive titles for Alumni. The club won the tournament 6 fixtures before the end of the season, when the squad beat Quilmes by 4-0 with the following line-up: J. W. Howard; George N. Dickinson, H. J. Reeves; C. Edgard Dickinson, Harold T. Ratcliff, H. Frasser; H. A. Ruggeroni, Norman G. Forrester, H. B. Knight, S. Rioboó, E. Frilling.

== Final standings ==
Pos	Team	Pld	W	D	L	GF	GA	GD	Pts
1	Belgrano A.C. (C)	10	9	0	1	30	9	+21	18
2	Alumni	10	5	3	2	18	9	+9	13
3	Lomas	10	5	1	4	9	10	−1	11
4	Barracas A.C.	10	5	0	5	13	16	−3	10
5	Estudiantes (BA)	10	2	1	7	12	27	−15	5
6	Quilmes	10	1	0	9	8	19	−11	2

(C) Champions
