= 1908 Argentine Primera División =

17th season of top-tier football league in Argentina

Primera División
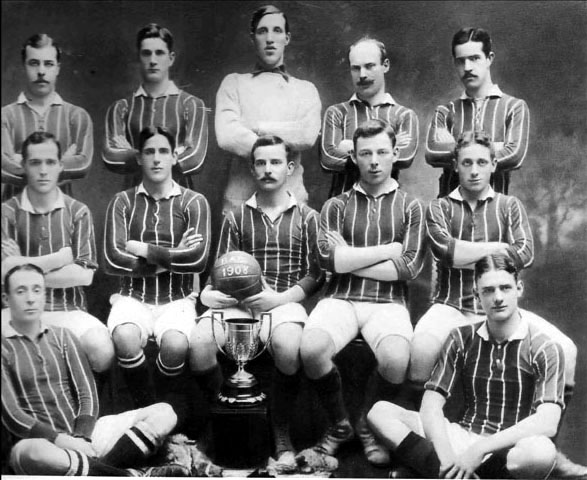
- Belgrano A.C., champion
- Season: 1908
- Champions: Belgrano A.C. (3rd title)
- Promoted: Nacional (Floresta) (Note: Disaffiliated by the Association due to the poor conditions of its stadium, according to the rules. The team had played only 2 matches.)
- Relegated: San Martín A.C.
- Top goalscorer: (Argentina) Eliseo Brown (Alumni) (19 goals)
- Biggest home win: Alumni 12–0 Reformer
- Biggest away win: Quilmes 0–7 Alumni

The 1908 Argentine Primera División was the 17th season of top-flight football in Argentina. The season began on April 26 and ended on November. The championship was reduced from 11 to 10 teams, with each team playing the other twice.

Belgrano Athletic won its third title, ending a run of three consecutive league championships for Alumni.

== Final standings ==
Pos	Team	Pld	W	D	L	GF	GA	GD	Pts
1	Belgrano A.C. (C)	18	15	1	2	49	20	+29	31
2	Alumni	18	13	1	4	74	18	+56	27
3	Argentino (Q)	18	12	1	5	44	26	+18	25
4	San Isidro	18	11	1	6	36	26	+10	23
5	Estudiantes (BA)	18	11	2	5	37	20	+17	22 (Note: Docked 2 points)
6	Quilmes	18	8	1	9	46	54	−8	17
7	Porteño	18	6	1	11	23	41	−18	13
8	Reformer	18	3	2	13	10	57	−47	8
9	Lomas	18	3	1	14	19	50	−31	7
10	San Martín A.C. (R)	18	2	1	15	16	42	−26	3 (Note: Docked 2 points and was relegated at the end of the tournament)

(C) Champions; (R) Relegated
