= Alumni Athletic Club =

Alumni
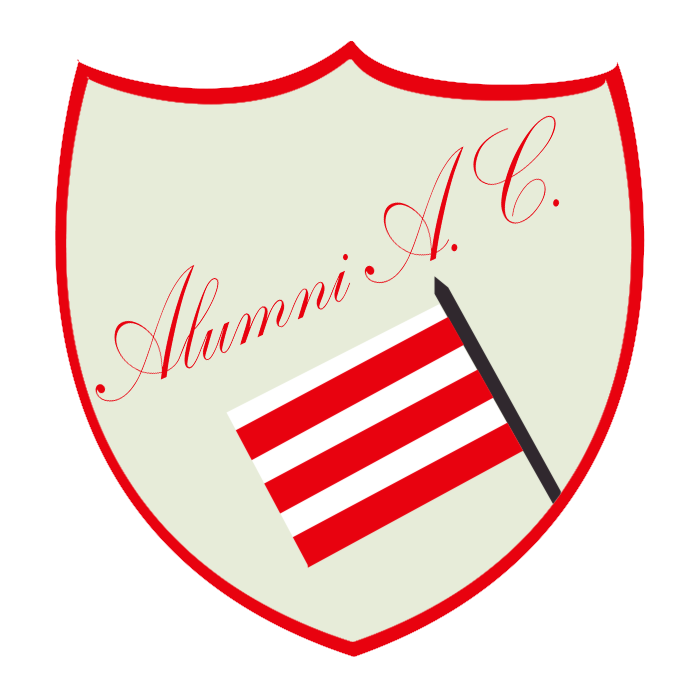
- Full name: Alumni Athletic Club
- Founded: 3 October 1898 (Note: Although the football team of the Buenos Aires English High School had participated in the Argentine Primera División in 1893 and 1895, the club was officially established in 1898 under the same name "Buenos Aires English High School A.C.". The name "Alumni" was adopted in 1901 when the Association stated that clubs with school names should be change their names to avoid advertisement purposes.)
- Dissolved: 1913; 113 years ago
- Ground: (none)
- League: Primera División
- 1911: 1st (champion)
Home colours

Alumni Athletic Club, or simply Alumni, was an Argentine football team active during the first years of the sport in that country. Although officially founded in 1898, the team had been formed in 1893 when a group of students from the Buenos Aires English High School joined Alexander Watson Hutton (considered the "father" of Argentine football) to form a team in order to participate in the championship organized by the Argentine Association Football League (then Argentine Football Association, which had been created that year).

The squad was active until 1911 and was disbanded in 1913 due to internal problems. During the years Alumni was active, the team won a total of 22 titles, including 15 domestic titles (10 Primera División championships and 5 national cups). At international level, Alumni won 7 titles, becoming one of the most important clubs in the history of Argentine football.

== History ==
=== The Buenos Aires English High School ===
On 25 February 1882, Scottish Professor Alexander Watson Hutton arrived to Buenos Aires. Hutton, considered "the father" of Argentine football, had been hired as Director of Saint Andrew's Scots School but resigned a short time later because the institution did not have funds to acquire sports facilities, which were considered by Hutton as an essential component of his teaching methods.

Watson Hutton then created the Buenos Aires English High School (BAEHS) to put in practise his ideas about education, with a special predilection for football. The BAEHS opened on 1 February 1884. To start with the practise of football in Argentina, Watson Hutton brought William Watters from Scotland, to work as a trainer. It was Watters who brought the first footballs from the United Kingdom.

=== First official match ===
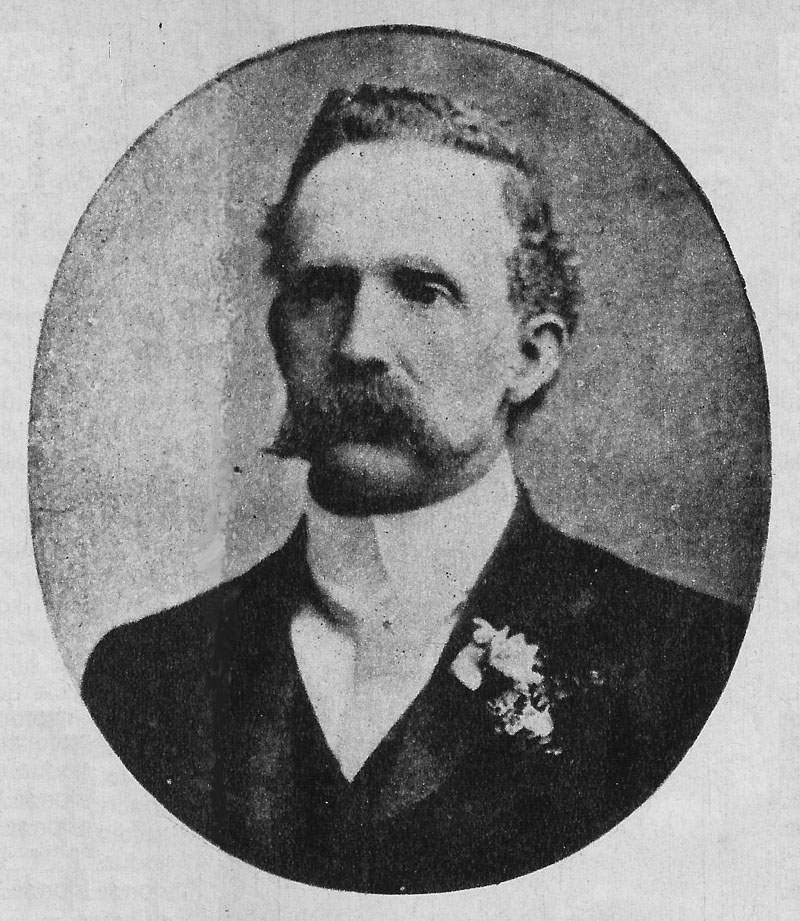
Alexander Watson Hutton, founder of Alumni and considered "the father" of Argentine football

By 1890 football in Buenos Aires had yet to be regulated by any federation although there were many institutions where the game was practised, such as Buenos Aires English High School, St. Andrew's Scots School, Flores Collegiate, Flores English College, Old Caledonians Football Club, Saint John's Football Club, Scotch Club and Buenos Aires Football Club.

In 1891 the Argentine Football Association League, the first football association outside United Kingdom, was established with the purpose of organising a championship, giving birth to the Primera División, the oldest football competition in South America. The following teams were registered: St. Andrew's Scots School, Old Caledonians, Buenos Aires and Rosario Railway, Belgrano Football Club (a predecessor of current Belgrano Athletic Club) and Buenos Aires Football Club. Nevertheless, this new tournament was badly criticized and was boycotted by most of the clubs. The title was won by St. Andrew's, considered today as the first Primera División champion ever, being recognised even by the AFA although the Association organised its first championship in 1893.

The AAFL was dissolved after the 1891 season. As a result, in 1892 no championship was held. On 21 February 1893, Watson Hutton created a new football league with the same name (current Argentine Football Association), with himself appointed as president.

The first championship organised by the new Association was the 1893 tournament, with five teams taking part: Lomas AC (which would be the champion), Flores, Quilmes Rowers, Buenos Aires al Rosario Railway and Buenos Aires English High School making its debut.

The BAEHS decided not to take part in the 1894 championship, which caused many of its players to move to other teams such as Lobos AC and Lanús Athletic Club.

=== Creation of an Athletic Club ===
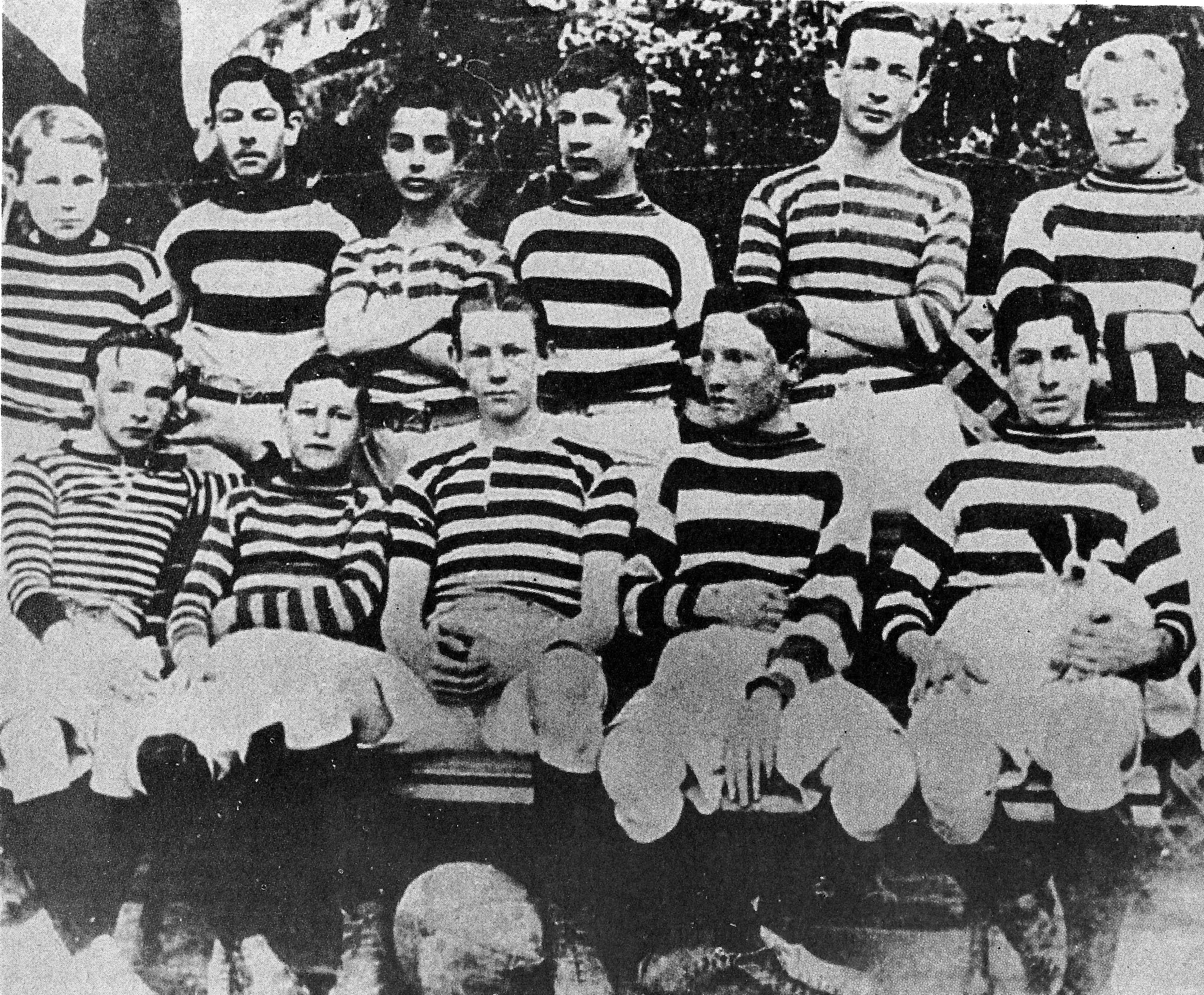
Buenos Aires English High School team, circa 1899

The BAEHS team returned to Primera División for the 1895 championship, won by Lomas. The team made a poor campaign, finishing in the last position. The BAESH would not take part in a Primera División tournament until 1900. As they had done in 1894, the students of the school played for other teams during this period.

In 1898 the Minister of Justice and Public Instruction ruled that teaching of physical exercises would be obligatory for all the national schools programs. Furthermore, it was required that each school had to create a sports club formed by their current and former students. As a result, on 3 October 1898, "English High School Athletic Club" was founded. The school bought its first facility in the Coghlan district of Buenos Aires, near the train station, with the purpose of practicing physical activities as it was required

In 1899 the Argentine Football Association created the second division, where the club registered a team. The championship was won by Banfield; English High School A.C. was the runner up. In 1900 the club decided to compete at the Primera División tournaments again, so some of its players returned to the team. Walter Buchanan, Juan McKechnie and Guillermo and Heriberto Jordán came from Lobos A.C. while brothers Tomás, Carlos and Jorge Brown came from Lanús A.C.

=== The long success ===
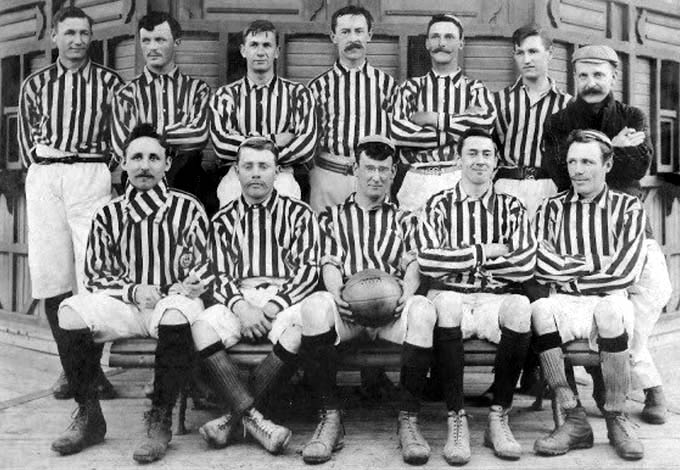
The team of 1903, champions

English High School won its first title in 1900, totaling 11 points in 6 games played. It began the long series of titles (10 over 11 seasons played) won by the team during its short existence in Argentine football.

At the end of the season, the Buenos Aires Herald newspaper decided to award a trophy (named "Herald Trophy") to the most popular team of Argentina. To establish this, the Herald made a survey among its readers, who had to send a voucher indicating their favorite team. The survey finished on 31 July 1900, and the English High School AC was awarded as "the most popular team" with 6.942 votes, followed by Quilmes (3.467 votes) and Belgrano Athletic (3.358).

In 1901 the Association forbade football teams to use names of Schools so BAEHS had to register a new name to play at football tournaments. One of club's members and former student Carlos Rowers, came up with the name "Alumni" which was immediately approved, therefore the team changed to "Alumni Athletic Club".

Under its new name, Alumni would win 3 consecutive championships (1901, 1902 and 1903). The 1901 team won all its games, scoring 12 goals and only receiving 1 in 6 matches played. Alumni also won its first international competition, the Tie Cup where teams from Buenos Aires, Rosario and Montevideo took part. The squad defeated Rosario Athletic by 2–1 at the final.

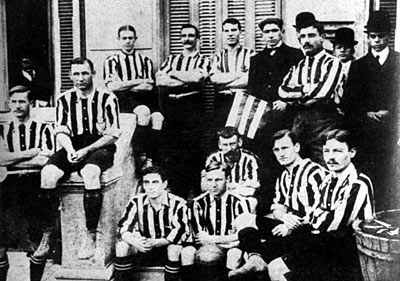
Alumni won a total of four championships in 1906

In 1902 Alumni finished unbeaten again, winning 7 of 8 games, scoring 24 goals (an average of 3 per game). The 1903 team won 9 of 10 games, with only one defeat to Belgrano AC by 1–0. Alumni scored 40 goals in the tournament (an average of 4 per game), with large victories over Lomas (3–0, 4–2), Flores AC (6–0, 10–0), Quilmes (4–0, 3–0) and Barracas AC (4–0). The 1903 team also won its second Tie Cup, defeating Rosario Athletic by 3–2.

In 1904 Alumni finished second to Belgrano Athletic, winning only 5 of 10 matches with 2 losses. The next year Alumni won another championship, with the adding of goalkeeper José Buruca Laforia and forward Carlos Lett (who would be the topscorer of the tournament with 12 goals). Alumni won 10 of 12 matches having lost only one and scoring 43 goals. The squad also achieved some highlights such two thrashing victories against Lomas (7–1 and 11–1), and a devastating 14–0 to Reformer AC. Alumni also won the first edition of the domestic Copa de Honor Municipalidad de Buenos Aires that same year, defeating Quilmes 1–0 at the final.

In 1905 Alumni also won its first domestic cup, the Copa de Honor Municipalidad de Buenos Aires, where the team eliminated Estudiantes (BA) and Belgrano AC before defeating Quilmes 1–0 at the final, with a goal scored during extra time.

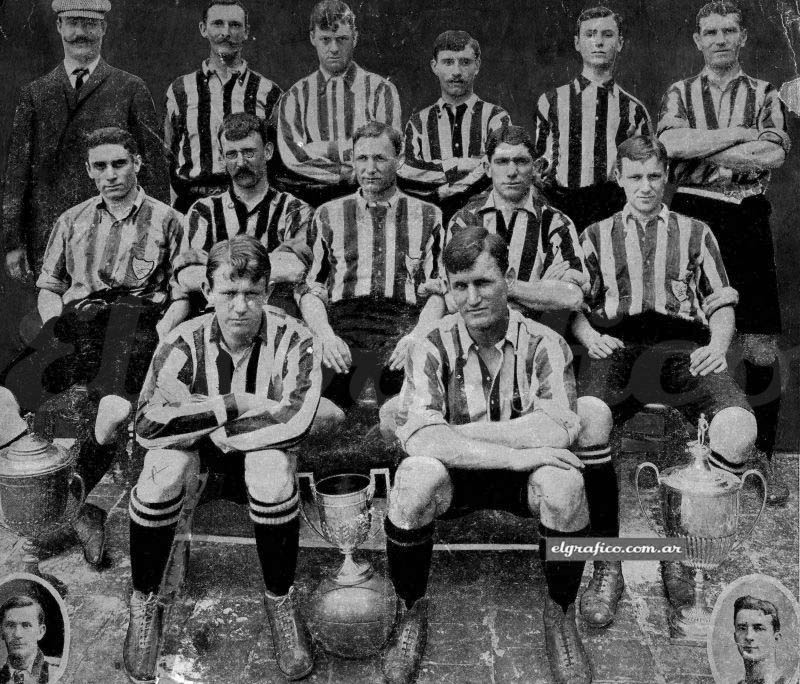
In 1907 Alumni won the Primera División title, finishing unbeaten

For the 1906 season, the Argentine tournament changed its format, with all its teams divided into two separated groups. The teams finishing first of each group played a final match in order to proclaim a champion. Alumni and Lomas won their respective zones, playing the final game that was won by Alumni 4–0. During the regular season, Alumni achieved largest victories to Belgrano AC (3–0, 4–0) and Quilmes (4–0). Alumni not only won its 6th. Primera División title, but its second consecutive Copa de Honor Municipalidad de Buenos Aires to Estudiantes (BA) by 3–1, the Tie Cup (demolishing Belgrano AC by 10–1), and the Copa de Honor Cousenier (against Uruguayan team Nacional). To sum up, Alumni won all the tournaments contested that year.

On 24 June, Alumni played the South African national team at Sociedad Sportiva Argentina stadium (where current Campo Argentino de Polo is located). The South Africa team had reaffiliated to The Football Association and was formed exclusively by white players, with seven of them born in South Africa and 8 originated from England and Scotland. At least 12,000 spectators attended the match, with the president of Argentina, José Figueroa Alcorta among them. The game finished 1–0 with a goal scored by Alfredo Brown in the 51st minute.

The victory was largely celebrated by the media for being the first time an Argentine squad defeated a British team. Local newspaper La Nación wrote: "For our national football, the Alumni v South Africa match was a great triumph that will be remembered for a long time in everyone's memory, serving as example and stimulus for the future", while British-origin newspaper The Standard wrote "it was a glorious victory and what happened in La Sportiva is promising for Argentine football".

Nevertheless, Alfredo Brown, who scored the only goal of the match, admitted the superiority of the British team when he said:

It were not the Alumni forwards who beat South Africa. It was Laforia –the goalkeeper– who did not allow a loss or a tie. He was unbeateable, extraordinary. South Africa played better than us. I did not more than take advantage of an excellent pass from Weiss, catching the ball at a distance of 6 or 7 meters from the goal. I only had to place my foot. I simulated to shot with the right one, but I let to pass the ball and kick it with the left foot, when the goalkeeper was completely undecided and confused.

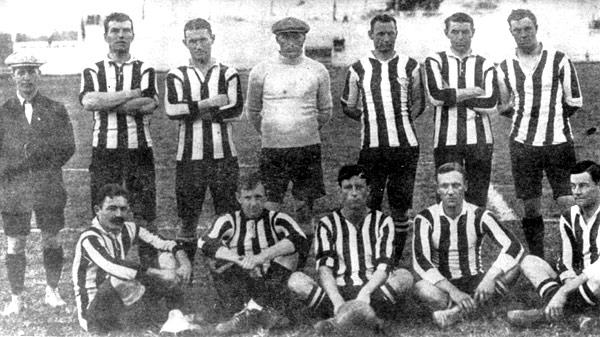
Although the team decreased its goal average, Alumni won another championship in 1910

Alumni won another title the following season, the 1907 championship. The squad finished unbeaten, totaling 37 points with 17 wins. Alumni achieved a large number of thrashing victories over some rivals, such as San Martín AC (7–0), Reformer (7–0 and 4–0), Quilmes (7–2), Barracas AC and San Isidro (5–0 both), Lomas (4–0 and 5–0), Argentino de Quilmes (5–1 both times), and Belgrano AC (4–0). Due to that outstanding performance on the field, the team reached a record of 76 goals scored in 20 matches (3,8 goals per game). That year Alumni won another domestic cup, the Copa de Competencia Jockey Club defeating Belgrano AC at the final, and its 4th Tie Cup championship, defeating CURCC at Ferro Carril Oeste stadium.

Although Alumni did not win a Primera División title in 1908 (where finished 2nd to Belgrano AC), the team got its third consecutive Copa Jockey Club title, easily defeating Argentino de Quilmes by 5–0 in the final. Internationally, Alumni also won another edition of Tie Cup, easily beating Montevideo Wanderers by 4–0 in Buenos Aires.

Alumni continued its successful campaign winning the Primera División championship in 1909, with 32 total points in 18 matches played with only 1 loss. Alumni scored 74 goals (achieving its highest average: 4,11 goals per game), with some large victories over San Isidro (with a devastating 9–0), Belgrano Athletic (6–2), Lomas (8–1 and 4–0), Reformer (7–1) and Estudiantes de Buenos Aires 6–1. Alumni also defeated River Plate (which debuted in Primera División) 3–1 being the first time both teams played against. That was not the only title won by the squad so Alumni won its 3rd consecutive Copa Jockey Club, demolishing Rosarino team Newell's Old Boys by 5–1 in the final match. The team also won by 4th. consecutive time the Tie Cup, beating CURCC 4–0. It would be the last international title won by Alumni, which totaled 7 championships before its dissolution.

Alumni won again a Primera División tournament in 1910. The team got 25 points in 16 matches played, with 42 goals scored (decreasing its goal average to 2,62). The team easily defeated River Plate (3–0 both times), with large wins over Argentino de Quilmes (6–1), Quilmes (5–0) and Gimnasia y Esgrima (BA) (6–0).

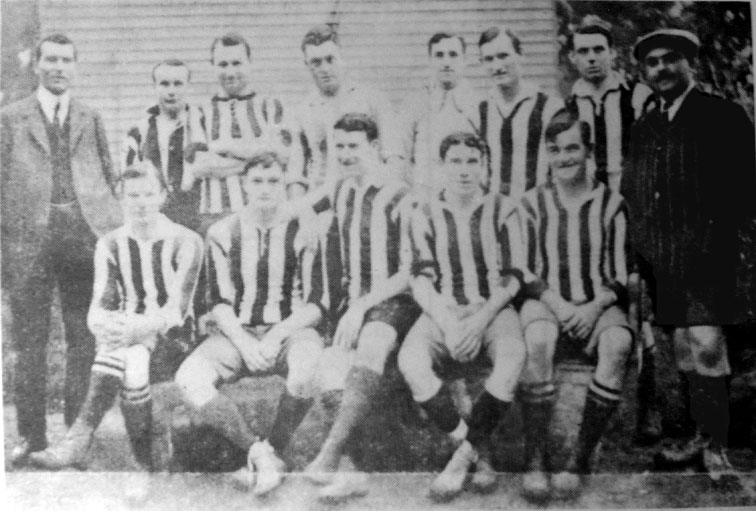
Alumni in 1911, the last year it played in Primera División

The 1911 season was the last time Alumni played officially. From then on, the team would be occasionally reunited for some friendly matches or exhibitions to keep the legend alive. With the 1911 title, Alumni won its second trichampionship after the first success of 1900–1902. That was the season where Alumni finished with the most losses (4) in 16 matches played. Alumni also shared the first position with Porteño so both teams had to play a championship playoff. The game (hosted in Gimnasia y Esgrima de Buenos Aires stadium) was won by Alumni 2–1, thus becoming the new Argentine football champion. Alfredo Brown and Lett were the scorers for Alumni.

During the regular season, Alumni's highlights were some large victories to Quilmes (7–0), River Plate (3–0 and 5–1), Gimnasia y Esgrima (BA) (5–1), Racing Club (5–1, although Racing had defeated them 3–1 in the first round), Estudiantes (BA) (6–0) and San Isidro (5–0).

Alumni finished its last season in official tournaments winning its 10th. league title and becoming the most successful team of Argentina by then with 22 official championships (10 league titles, 5 national cups and 7 international titles). Alumni is also placed 6th. in the all-time ranking of most winning Primera División championships, along with Vélez Sársfield with 10 titles each.

=== Dissolution ===
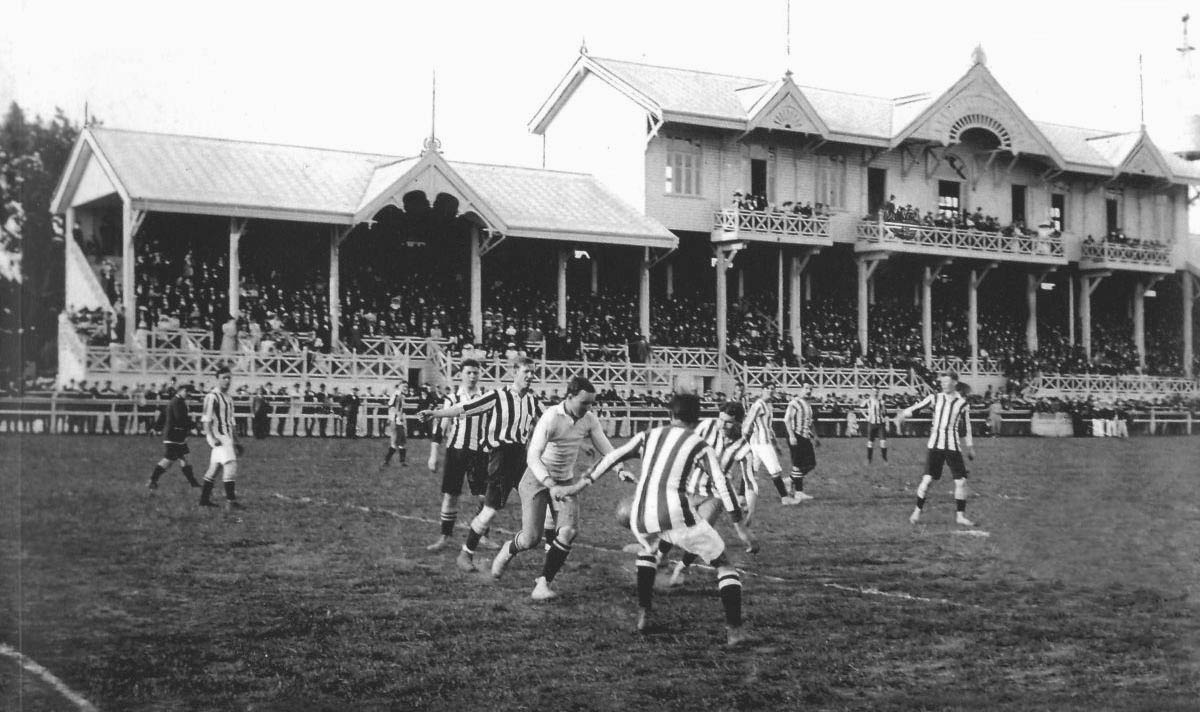
Last Alumni's (in white shorts) official game, vs. Porteño at Gimnasia y Esgrima (BA), 1911

Despite being registered for the 1912 tournament, the team did not play any match. Alumni forfeited its games against Estudiantes (BA), Quilmes and Racing, respectively. After those forfeits, and based on the rules for the competition, the Association disaffiliated Alumni. Many of its players moved to Quilmes, other team with British origins, which finally would obtain the title that year.

Alumni A.C. Dear member: You are invited to a meeting which will be celebrated on 24 April in the A.F.A. building, located in Maipú street 131, at 9 p.m. The object is to discuss about the dissolution of the club and how the funds will be distributed according to our rules.

— La Nación, 18 to 24 April 1913.

There were two main reasons for Alumni's demise: the first cause was the shortage of players due to the fact that Alumni rarely admitted players outside the English High School. The second reason was that Alumni was losing a lot of money (due to the fact that the club often donated its incomes to benefit) and it seemed unlikely that the team could fulfil its matches for 1912 season. The club was dissolved on 24 April 1913. All the members were invited to the assembly, but only 7 attended.

Once the team was disbanded, the assets ($12.322,29) were donated to eight public institutions, the Hospital Británico and the Patronato de la Infancia were among them

Despite having been dissolved, former Alumni players used to reunite to play friendly matches.

=== Rebirth through rugby ===
In 1951 the English High School asked its former students for permission to re-establish the name "Alumni" for a rugby team, which would be immediately approved so the "Asociación Alumni" was founded and has remained to date.

== Players ==
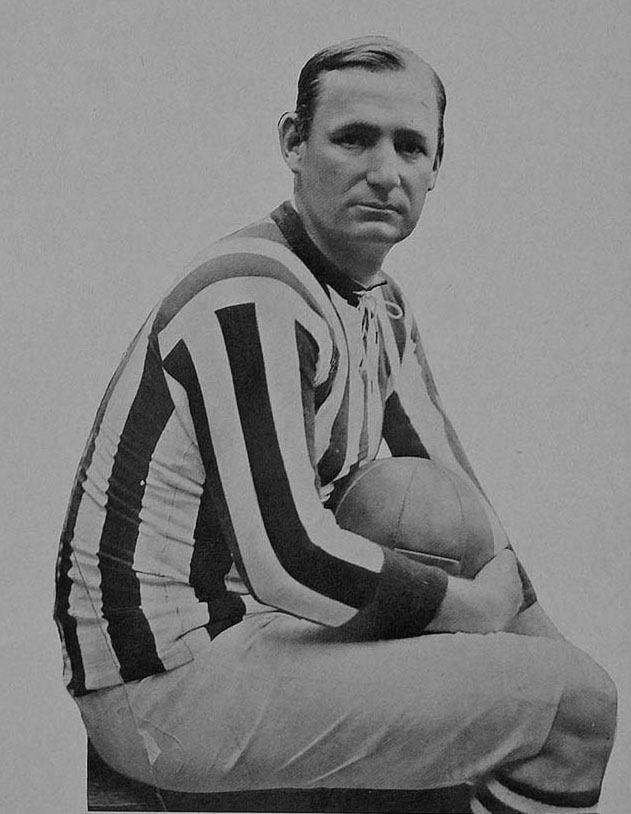
Jorge Brown was also Argentina national team captain between 1908 and 1914

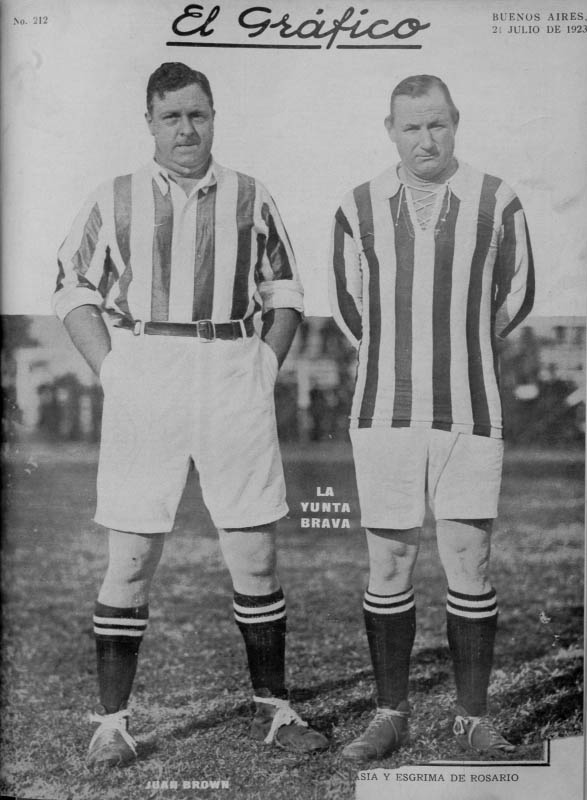
Juan and Jorge Brown pictured in 1923

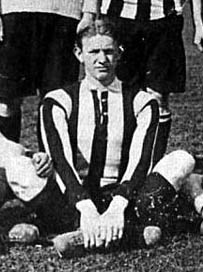
Eliseo Brown is Alumni all-time topscorer with 68 goals

The most prominent Alumni's player was Jorge Brown, who was the team's captain during two periods: first from 1903 to 1906, and then from 1910 until its dissolution. Five of Jorge's brothers were also players for Alumni: Alfredo, Eliseo, Carlos, Juan and Ernesto, and his cousin Juan Domingo as well.

Another notable player was the goalkeeper José Buruca Laforia, who arrived at the club in 1905 and remained until 1907. Juan McKechnie (1891–94, 1900–04) was another remarkable goalkeeper who gave sterling service to the team.

Alumni was also famous due to its notable strikers, with many of them being the top scorers of the first division championships. Amongst them were Alfredo and Eliseo Brown, Carlos and Ernesto Lett and Arnoldo Watson Hutton.

Many Alumni footballers were usually called up to play for the Argentina national team. Moreover, four of the Brown brothers were repeatedly called together for a match, while five of the Brown cousins took part of Alumni squad for the Brazil tour from 2 June to 14 July 1907.

With a team consisting of many Alumni players, the Argentina national football team won the Copa Lipton four consecutive times: 1906 (8 players from Alumni), 1907 (7), 1908 (5) and 1909 (7). The squad also obtained the Copa Newton in 1906 (with 7 players from Alumni), 1907 (4), 1908 (7) and 1909 (3). Argentina also won the "Copa de Honor Gran Premio de Argentina" in 1909 (7) and 1911 (6).

=== Topscorers by season ===
Season	Player	Goals
1900	Spencer Leonard	8
1902	(Argentina) Jorge Brown	11
1903	(Argentina) Jorge Brown	12
1904	(Argentina) Alfredo Brown	11
1905	(Argentina) Carlos Lett	12
1906	(Argentina) Eliseo Brown	8
1907	(Argentina) Eliseo Brown	24
1908	(Argentina) Eliseo Brown	19
1909	(Argentina) Eliseo Brown	17
1910	(Argentina) Arnold Watson Hutton	13
1911	(Argentina) Ernesto Lett	10

=== Team Captains ===
Period	Player
1899–1902	(Australia) (Argentina) Andrés Mack
1903–04	(Argentina) Jorge Brown
1905	(Argentina) Juan J. Moore
1906	(Argentina) Jorge Brown
1907–10	(Argentina) Alfredo Brown
1910–11	(Argentina) Jorge Brown

== Uniform ==
The English High School uniform was based on what students wore at school: a white T-shirt with horizontal red stripes. When the team changed its name in 1901 so the uniform was changed to vertical red stripes. The shorts were white in most of the cases, but Alumni also used a black model and other in navy blue.

1893–1900	1901–11

== Records and facts ==
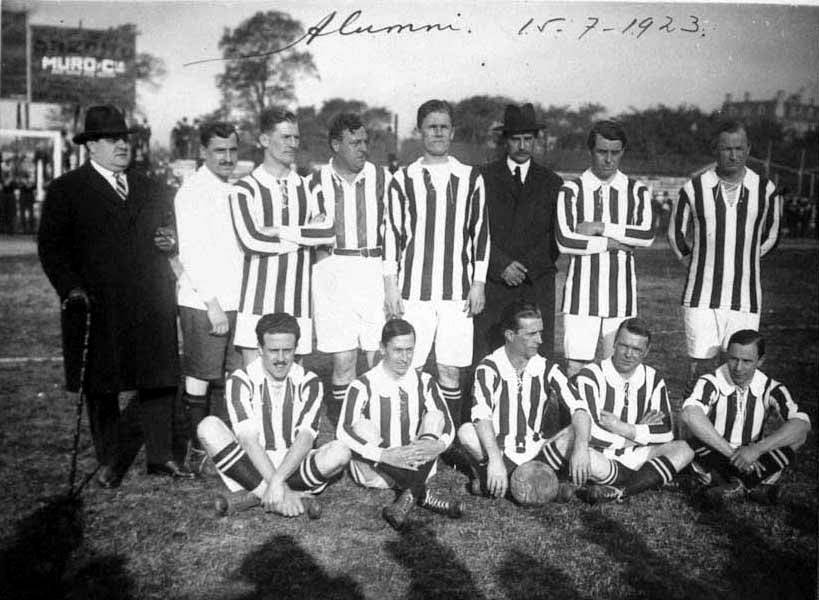
Players of Alumni in a match of "Liga de Veteranos" on 15 July 1923, more than ten years after its dissolution

- The first Argentine football team to defeat a British squad, South Africa (affiliated to the English Association and composed of white players, with most of them of British origins) in 1906.
- The first club to win three or more consecutive championships in three different times: 1900–1903; 1905–1907; 1909–1911.
- Eliseo Brown was the Argentine Primera División top scorer four consecutive times: 1906 (8 goals), 1907 (24), 1908 (19) y 1909 (17).
- The first Rioplatense club which won the Primera División, the Tie Cup and the Copa de Honor Cousenier within the same year (1906). The club also won the Copa de Honor Municipalidad de Buenos Aires, totaling 4 titles (all the tournaments contested).
- In 1904, football club Barracas Central adopted the red and white uniform colors as a tribute to Alumni. Other clubs that took the red and white colors honoring Alumni were Estudiantes de La Plata and Talleres de Remedios de Escalada (both in 1906), Unión de Santa Fe and now defunct Boca Alumni (both in 1907).
- The traditional Uruguay national football team light blue color was adopted after River Plate F.C. wore a jersey that color when defeated Alumni 2–1, on 10 April 1910. Until then Uruguay had worn several shirt models.
- The Club Atlético Alumni, located in Villa María, Córdoba, Argentina, choose not only its name but its color to honour the legacy of Alumni.
- Alumni never played against Boca Juniors (due to the club abandoned official competitions in 1911, while Boca Juniors debuted in Primera División in 1913), Independiente (1912) or San Lorenzo (1915).

== Special awards ==
- Trophy awarded by the Argentine Association in recognition to the first tri-championship won by the team (1900, 1901 and 1902).
- Copa Recompensa (Reward Cup), awarded by the Argentine Association in recognition to the titles of 1905, 1906, 1907, 1909, 1910 and 1911.
- Herald Trophy as "the most popular team of Argentina", according to a survey organized in 1900 by the Buenos Aires Herald, won by Alumni with 6.942 votes.

== Largest victories ==
During its short existence, Alumni achieved a considerable number of large victories over its rivals. Lomas Athletic, Reformer, Belgrano Athletic and San Isidro were some of the teams thrashed by Alumni several times. The list below includes the results by 4 or more goals of difference over its opponents.

Largest victories of Alumni A.C.
Year	Competition	Rival	Score	Date
1900	Primera División	Quilmes	4–0	14 Jun
1900	Primera División	Quilmes	5–0	15 Aug
1901	Tie Cup	Lomas	4–0	29 Jun
1902	Primera División	Barracas AC	8–1	29 Jun
1902	Primera División	Belgrano AC	10–0	3 Aug
1903	Primera División	Flores	6–0	3 May
1903	Primera División	Quilmes	4–0	10 May
1903	Primera División	Belgrano AC	4–0	31 May
1903	Primera División	Flores	10–0	5 Jul
1903	Tie Cup	Belgrano AC	6–1	21 Jun
1904	Primera División	Barracas AC	5–0	7 Aug
1905	Primera División	Lomas	7–1	14 May
1905	Primera División	Reformer	14–0	21 May
1905	Primera División	Lomas	11–1	8 Sep
1906	Primera División	Belgrano Extra	5–1	20 May
1906	Primera División	Belgrano Extra	9–0	1 Jul
1906	Primera División	Quilmes	4–0	23 Sep
1906	Primera División	Lomas	4–0	7 Oct
1906	Tie Cup	Belgrano AC	10–1	30 Aug
1906	Copa de Honor MCBA	Rosario Central	6–1	27 May
1907	Primera División	Argentino (Q)	5–1	5 May
1907	Primera División	Lomas	4–0	12 May
1907	Primera División	San Martín AC	7–0	25 May
1907	Primera División	Barracas AC	5–0	2 Jun
1907	Primera División	Lomas	5–0	30 Jun
1907	Primera División	Belgrano AC	4–0	7 Jul
1907	Primera División	Reformer	7–0	14 Jul
1907	Primera División	Argentino (Q)	5–1	15 Sep
1907	Primera División	San Isidro	5–0	22 Sep
1907	Primera División	Quilmes	7–2	20 Oct
1908	Primera División	Porteño	6–0	7 Jun
1908	Primera División	Reformer	12–0	21 Jun
1908	Primera División	San Martín AC	5–1	19 Jul
1908	Primera División	Quilmes	7–0	30 Aug
1908	Primera División	Quilmes	7–0	8 Sep
1908	Primera División	Argentino (Q)	7–0	27 Sep
1908	Primera División	San Isidro	5–1	18 Oct
1908	Primera División	Reformer	4–0	25 Oct
1908	Tie Cup	Wanderers	4–0	6 Sep
1909	Tie Cup	CURCC	4–0	5 Sep
1909	Primera División	Belgrano AC	6–2	2 May
1909	Primera División	Lomas	8–1	20 May
1909	Primera División	CURCC	7–1	18 Jul
1909	Primera División	San Isidro	9–0	26 Sep
1909	Primera División	Lomas	4–0	24 Oct
1909	Primera División	Estudiantes (BA)	6–1	7 Nov
1910	Primera División	Argentino (Q)	6–1	30 Aug
1910	Primera División	Quilmes	5–0	4 Sep
1910	Primera División	Gim. y Esg (BA)	6–0	2 Oct
1911	Primera División	Quilmes	7–0	4 Jun
1911	Primera División	Gim. y Esg. (BA)	5–1	23 Jul
1911	Primera División	Racing	5–1	6 Ago
1911	Primera División	River Plate	5–1	3 Sep
1911	Primera División	Estudiantes (BA)	6–0	8 Sep
1911	Primera División	San Isidro	5–0	24 Sep

== Honours ==
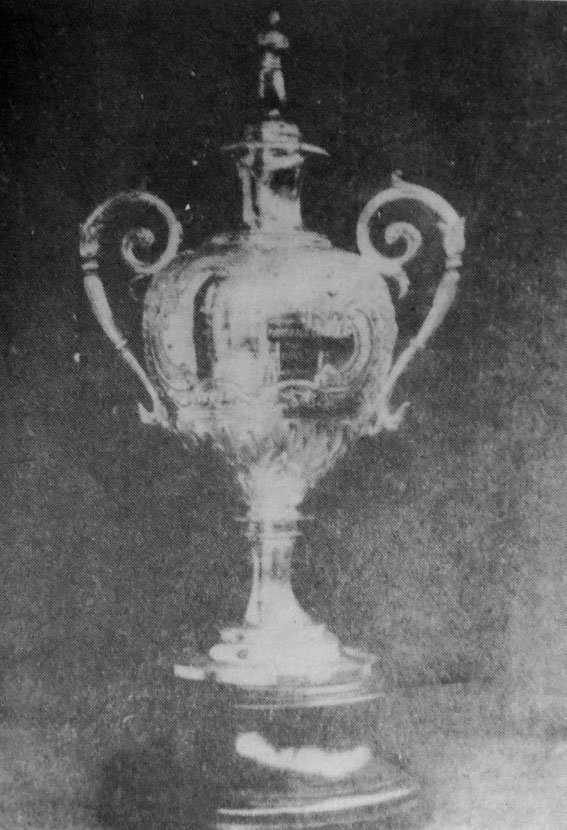
The trophy awarded to Alumni, in recognition of the 1900, 1901 and 1902 titles

=== National ===
==== League ====
- Primera División (10): 1900, 1901, 1902, 1903, 1905, 1906, 1907, 1909, 1910, 1911

==== National cups ====
- Copa de Honor Municipalidad de Buenos Aires (2): 1905, 1906
- Copa de Competencia Jockey Club (3) 1907, 1908, 1909

=== International ===
- Tie Cup (6): 1901, 1903, 1906, 1907, 1908, 1909
- Copa de Honor Cousenier (1): 1906
