= Reformer Athletic Club =

Reformer
- Full name: Reformer Athletic Club
- Founded: 1903
- Dissolved: 1910
- Ground: Campana, Buenos Aires
- League: Primera División
- 1909: 9° (relegated)
Home colours

Reformer Athletic Club was an Argentine sports club based in the city of Campana, Buenos Aires. Founded by British-origin citizens, Reformer was mostly known for its football squad, which played in Primera División during the first years of football in Argentina.

Apart from football, sports practised in the club included athletics, bocce, cricket, and tennis.

== History ==
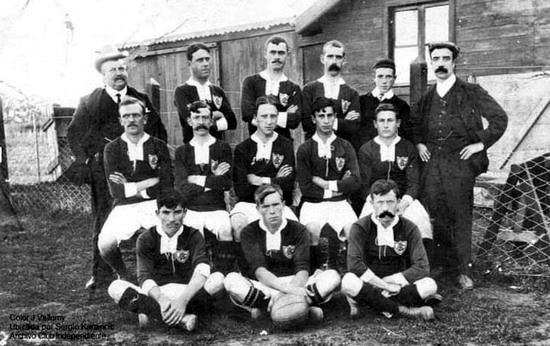
A Reformer squad of 1905

Reformer Athletic Club was founded by British-origin employees of the River Plate Fresh Meat Company, a meatpacking plant placed in the city of Campana, in Buenos Aires Province. Apart from football, several sports were practised at the club, such as athletics, bowls, cricket and tennis. Reformer is widely considered the pioneer of the sports clubs in Campana.

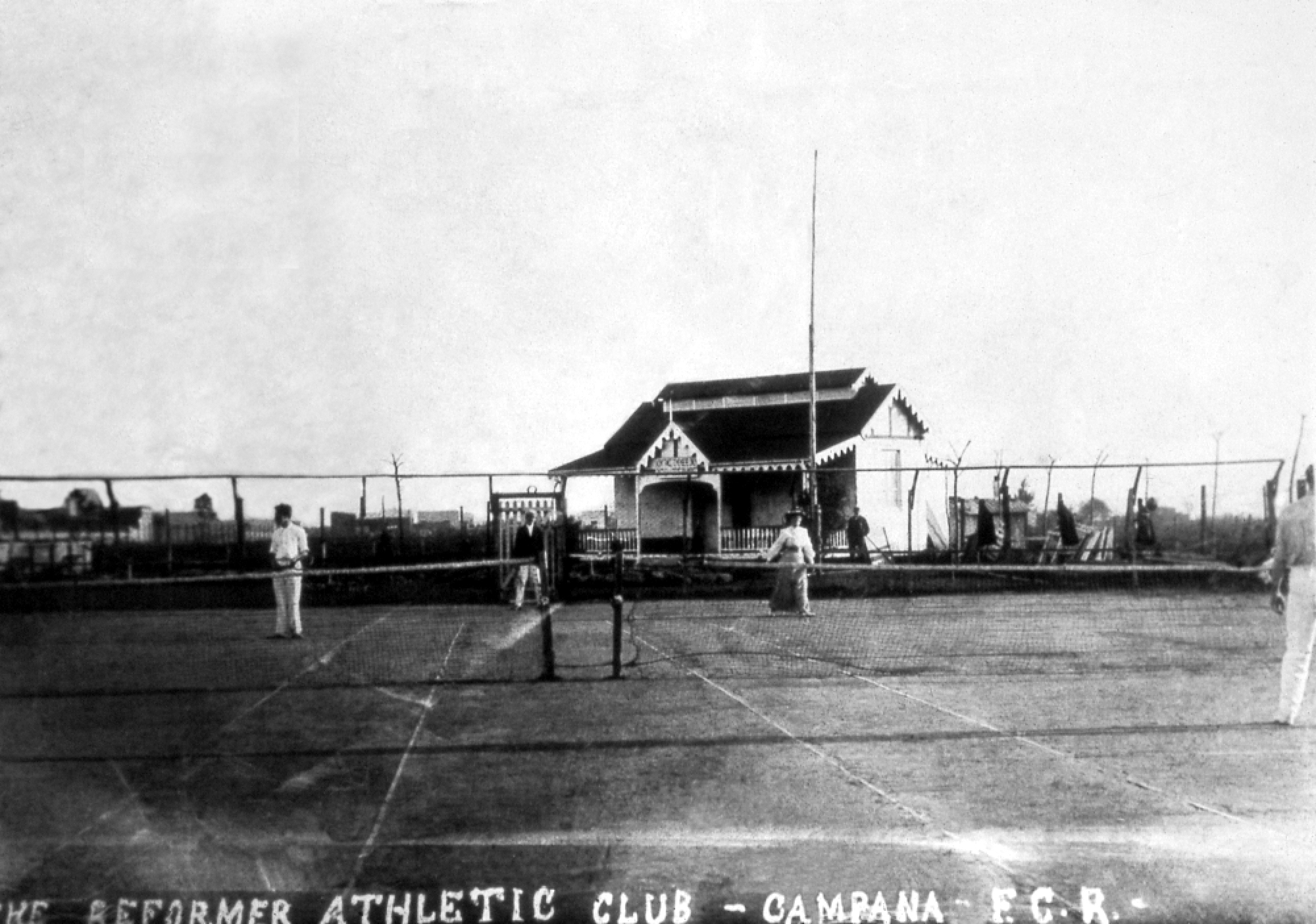
Clubhouse and courts

There are no records about the exact date of establishment of Reformer A.C., although it is believed that it was in 1903, shortly prior to the club registered a football squad with the Argentine Football Association to play the 1905 Primera División championship. Ernest Cunningham was not only the meatpacking plant manager but the football team captain.

Reformer debuted in Primera División on 28 May 1905 v Estudiantes (BA), with the following line up: W. Nash; James Paterson, Felipe Mallet; Herbert Barron, Mauricio Mallet, Percy Compton; Alejandro Christensen, John Sullivan, Harry Cunningham, Richard Gibbs, Stanley Burt. Reformer was easily defeated by Estudiantes, 8–0.

In its first season in official tournaments, Reformer made a poor campaign, finishing the season with 60 goals conceded in 12 matches played.

In 1909 Reformer was relegated (along with Lomas), both becoming the first teams in the history of Primera División to be relegated under the promotion and relegation system. Reformer played the Segunda División championship until 1910 when the team was dissolved.
