= Barracas Athletic Club =

Barracas A.C.
- Full name: Barracas Athletic Club
- Founded: 1901
- Dissolved: 1907; 118 years ago
- Ground: (None)
- League: Primera División
- 1907: 11° (relegated)
Home colours

Barracas Athletic Club was a football club from Lanús, Greater Buenos Aires, Argentina. The club was notable for having played several seasons in Argentine Primera División, the top division of Argentine football league system.

== History ==
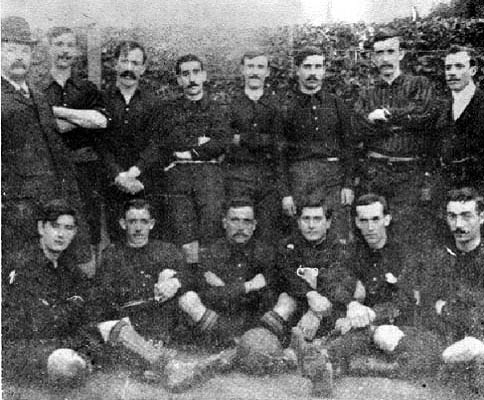
Barracas A.C. in 1904, with Uruguayan brothers Carlos and Bolívar Céspedes as part of the team

Established in 1901, the club debuted in Primera División in 1902 after winning the Segunda División title one year before. In its first season in the top division, Barracas A.C. made a good campaign, finishing 2nd. to Alumni.

The squad continued playing all the tournaments until 1907 when the team finished last and was relegated to the second division. It is believed that Barracas A.C. was dissolved that same year.

Uruguayan brothers Carlos and Bolívar Céspedes (considered football pioneers of that country, being part of the Club Nacional de Football that won its first titles in Uruguayan Primera División) played for Barracas A.C. when they exiled from Uruguay due to the civil war of 1904. José Buruca Laforia, who was Barracas goalkeeper, gave his place to recently arrived Amílcar Céspedes, while he switch to forward position.

At the end of the war, the Céspedes brothers returned to Montevideo where they joined Nacional again. Nevertheless, in 1905 Carlos and Bolívar died of smallpox, at the age of 21 and 20 respectively.

== Honours ==
=== National ===
- Segunda División (1): 1901
