= AFA Liga Profesional de Fútbol =

Argentine association football league

Argentine Primera División
- Organising body: AFA
- Founded: 12 April 1891; 135 years ago
- First season: 1891
- Country: Argentina
- Confederation: CONMEBOL
- Number of clubs: 30
- Level on pyramid: 1
- Relegation to: Primera Nacional
- Domestic cup(s): Copa Argentina; Supercopa Argentina; Trofeo de Campeones; Supercopa Internacional
- International cup(s): Copa Libertadores; Copa Sudamericana
- Current champions: Belgrano (2026 Apertura) (1st title); Estudiantes LP (2025 Clausura) (7th title); Boca Juniors (2026 Liga) (36th title)
- Most championships: River Plate (38 titles)
- Most appearances: Hugo Gatti (765)
- Top scorer: Ángel Labruna (295)
- Broadcasters: ESPN Premium; TNT Sports (Argentina)
- Website: ligaprofesional.ar
- Current: 2026

The Primera División (Spanish pronunciation: [pɾiˈmeɾa ðiβiˈsjon]; English: "First Division"), known officially as Liga Profesional de Fútbol, or Torneo "Mercado Libre" (Torneo MELI) for sponsorship reasons, is a professional association football league in Argentina and the highest level of the Argentine football league system. Organised by the Argentine Football Association (AFA), it operates on a system of promotion and relegation with the Primera Nacional (Second Division). The teams placed lowest at the end of the season are relegated.

Argentina held its first championship in 1891, making it the first country outside the United Kingdom to establish a football league. The Football League had debuted in England in 1888, followed by the Scottish and Irish leagues in 1890. In the early years, only teams from Buenos Aires, Greater Buenos Aires, La Plata, Rosario, Santa Fe and Córdoba were affiliated to the national association. Teams from other cities would join in later years.

In 1931, the Primera División became professional when 18 clubs left the amateur leagues to form their own professional competition.

The Argentine championship was ranked as one of the top ten strongest leagues worldwide for the 2015 calendar year by the International Federation of Football History & Statistics (IFFHS). Argentina placed 4th after La Liga (Spain), Serie A (Italy), and Bundesliga (Germany), but has since descended to 19th in the 2021 list. In 2023, the IFFHS ranked Liga Profesional in the 10th. place with 966,5 points (Italian Serie A was first with 1619,5 points).

== Format and teams ==
=== Championship ===
The competition format for this season consists of three tournaments (Torneo Apertura, Torneo Clausura and Campeón de Liga) each with five stages. In the first stage, the thirty teams were divided into two groups of fifteen teams each and will play in a single round-robin format. Additionally, each team will play two inter-zone matches: against its rival from the other zone, and the second against a second team, determined by a draw. The top eight teams in each group will advance to the round of 16.

The final stages (round of 16, quarter-finals, semi-finals and final) will be played on a single-leg basis. In addition, the team that accumulates the most points in the aggregate table will obtain the official title of 'Campeón de Liga'.

=== Relegation ===
Relegation is based on an averaging system. At the end of the season, the two teams with the worst three-year averages are relegated, while the winner and runner-up of Primera Nacional championship are promoted to Primera.

=== Domestic cups ===
The Primera División champion gains a place to play the Trofeo de Campeones de la Liga Profesional, where winners of Apertura and Clausura tournament play to define a cup champion.

=== International cups ===
As of 2026 AFA Liga Profesional de Fútbol, six clubs from Argentina are eligible to play the Copa Libertadores. The champions of Apertura and Clausura automatically qualify for the tournament. Besides, four clubs placed 2nd to 5th in the aggregate table also qualify to the competition. The 6th. team eligible to Copa Libertadores is the winner of Copa Argentina.

For the Copa Sudamericana, six teams are eligible. Clubs placed 6th to 11th in the table at the end of the tournament, gain a place to play the cup.

== History ==
=== Round-robin amateur tournaments (1891–1931) ===
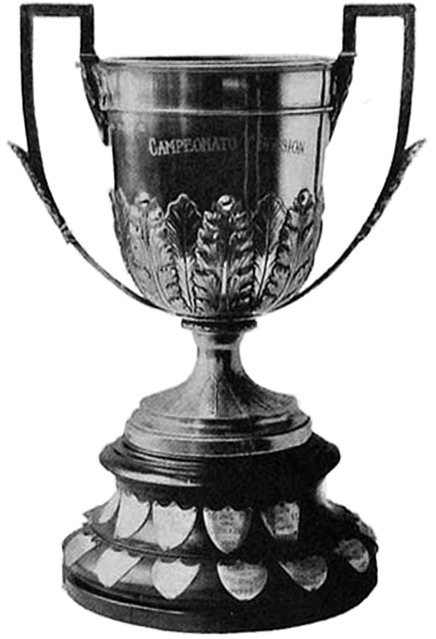
The Copa Campeonato was the first trophy awarded by the AFA, then abandoned and re-issued from 2013 to 2015.

In 1891 the Association Argentine Football League was established, with Alex Lamont of St. Andrew's Scots School as one of its board members. The AAFL was the first football league outside of the British Isles., to establish a football league. The first amateur Primera División matches were played on 12 April 1891: Buenos Aires FC vs. St. Andrew's and Old Caledonians vs. Belgrano FC.

=== Professional era tournaments (1931–1966) ===
A single double round-robin tournament was played each year, and the team with the most points was crowned as champion, except for 1936, during that year the winners of Copa de Honor and the Campeonato played a match for the championship title. The single tournament arrangement lasted until 1966.

During this period, the traditional "Big Five" clubs, namely, River Plate, Boca Juniors, Independiente, Racing and San Lorenzo dominated Argentine football. No other team besides them had won the league championship in these 36 years. The most serious title challenge came from Banfield in 1951, when they finished with the same number of points as Racing Club in the league table. However, they lost 1–0 in the two-legged first place playoffs and gave the title to Racing.

The averaging system for relegations was implemented for the first time in the 1957 championship, with Ferro Carril Oeste becoming the first team to be relegated under that system. Averaging continued until 1963, when the championship returned to its old format (with the worst placed teams being relegated). Nevertheless, there were no relegations until 1967 (with Unión (SF) and Deportivo Español being sent to Primera B after playing a relegation tournament contested by teams of First and Second divisions to define the promotions and relegations).

=== Metropolitano and Nacional (1967–1985) ===
In 1967, the single tournament format was abandoned and replaced by two championships in each year: the Metropolitano and the Nacional. The Metropolitano only allowed clubs competing in the old tournament to participate, while the Nacional was open to teams from regional tournaments. The format of competition was also altered, with the double round-robin tournament replaced by the two-group championship Metropolitano and single round-robin Nacional in that year.

This change revolutionized Argentine football, allowing smaller clubs—such as Estudiantes de La Plata, Vélez Sarsfield, and Chacarita Juniors—to challenge the dominance of the five clubs that had previously won all championships.

Between 1967 and 1969, the Metropolitano and Nacional had gone through several format changes. In the first three years, the Metropolitano was a two-group championship, with the best two teams from each group competing the semi-finals of the knock-out stage.

The six best teams of each group would advance to the Nacional, with four more teams coming from regional tournaments, to compete for the Nacional championship in a single round-robin format. The seventh and eighth team of each group, alongside four teams from regional tournaments, played the Promocional tournament, which, in 1969, was replaced by the Petit tournament contested without regional teams. The ninth to twelfth teams of each group entered the Reclasificatorio tournament to determine the relegating teams.

In 1970, the format of the Metropolitano and Nacional underwent a reform. Since that year, and until 1985, the Nacional had become a group tournament with playoffs, while the Metropolitano had been competed under a single or double round-robin system, except for the 1974, 1976 and 1979 edition, which were also contested as a group tournament with playoffs.

Despite the format change in 1970, teams still entered the Nacional championship, Petit tournament and Reclasificatorio tournament according to their rankings in the Metropolitano in that year. However, in 1971, the tournaments were separated. Teams did not enter the Nacional by finishing at the top ranks of Metropolitano. On the other hand, the Petit tournament and Reclasificatorio tournament were abandoned. The Metropolitano and Nacional became two truly individual tournaments. Although the old system was reused in 1972, the separation was instituted again in 1973 and was adopted throughout the remaining Metropolitano and Nacional era.

The Metropolitano was always played first, until the order of the tournaments was reversed in 1982.

After 20 years since the last time it had been used, the average system for relegations returned in the 1983 Metropolitano championship, two years after San Lorenzo was relegated. That year, River Plate finished 18° out of 19 teams and would have been relegated under the old system, along with Racing de Córdoba. The first teams to be relegated on average were Racing and Nueva Chicago. Boca Juniors was also struggling at that time and had a dismal 1984 season. These facts have led to speculation that the averaging system was instituted to minimize the chance of big teams being relegated.

=== European-styled seasons (1985–1991) ===
Following the advice of Argentina national football team's then coach Carlos Salvador Bilardo, the structure of play was modified in 1985. Traditionally, like other countries in Southern Hemisphere, football season began and ended according to the calendar year. However, upon the reform, European style season was adopted for the first time among all the South American countries. Moreover, instead of holding two championships every year, only one double round-robin tournament was contested, like football leagues in Europe. The team topping the table at the end of season was crowned the champion.

In 1985, after the Nacional was played, the Metropolitano was not held, while the new single tournament (1985/86) was played for the first time.

In 1988–89 season, three points were given to match winners. If a draw occurred, A penalty shootout took place and the winner of the shootout would get two points while the loser still had one. This format was scrapped in the following season.

=== Apertura and Clausura (1991–2012) ===
Five years later, the single championship was split into two single-round tournaments, giving birth to the Apertura and Clausura arrangement. In 1991 the two champions played winner-take-all matches. This practice was very controversial, especially since one of the biggest teams, Boca Juniors, lost the finals against Newell's Old Boys, costing them their first official championship since 1981 despite an unbeaten run in the Clausura. In 1992 the game was held as well (this time between Newell's Old Boys and River Plate), but regardless of the result (which favored River Plate) both teams were awarded the title of Champion. After 1992, the practice was quickly abandoned, so that two champions (on equal footing) were crowned every season and no deciding game is played.

Originally, two points were given to match winners except in the 1989–90 season. Starting in 1995–96, the rule was changed and three points were given for a win, one for a draw and none for a loss.

The 1999–2000 season introduced the promotion and relegation system for the first time, where the two clubs placed 1st and 2nd within the four teams with the lowest average, had to play a two-leg series with teams from Primera B Nacional to keep their place in the division.

=== Inicial and Final (2012–2014) ===
For the 2012–13 season, the Torneo Apertura and Clausura became "Torneo Inicial" and "Torneo Final," being disputed with the same format as before but proclaiming only one champion each season, unlike the last format that had two champions (Apertura and Clausura, respectively).

Before those changes, a controversial project for the 2012–13 season had been proposed: it consisted in a new tournament that would contain both the Primera División and Primera B Nacional teams: the former was not going to have any relegated team in its 2011–12 season and include sixteen teams from the latter, Primera B Nacional. The tournament would also include a team from the Primera B Metropolitana and one from the Torneo Argentino A, creating a 38-team league. These changes were strongly opposed by the media and the people, and finally the tournament was called off. However, the project for the new format was successfully picked up starting from the 2015 season.

=== Superfinal (2013–2014) ===
Once the initial and final tournaments had finished, both winners had to play a match for the Copa Campeonato (familiarly known as Superfinal). The AFA had previously determined that the first edition (played in 2013) would be considered as a Primera División official title (2012–13 season), therefore Vélez Sarsfield was awarded its 10th official championship after defeating Newell's.

Nevertheless, from the 2014 edition it was determined that the Superfinal would not be considered as a Primera División title but an official cup.

Due to this the 2015 and 2016 seasons were played as single tournaments with only one champion per season, the Copa Campeonato has not been held since then.

=== 2014–20: One tournament again and Superliga ===
Starting August 2014, the "Torneo de Transición" was held, with 20 teams participating (17 from the 2013–14 season and 3 promoted from the 2013–14 Primera B Nacional). No teams were relegated at the end of the championship.

In 2015, the format switched to a tournament with 30 teams. The first five clubs of the Zonas A & B of 2014 Primera B Nacional season promoted to the Primera División. Those 10 teams, with the addition of the 20 clubs currently participating in the top division, qualified to contest the next season.

That same year, the AFA announced the format for the next five seasons of the Primera División:

- In the first half of 2016, the league was contested by 30 teams. One team was relegated to and one team was promoted from Primera B Nacional.
- From August 2016 to June 2017, the league was also contested by 30 teams. Four teams were relegated to and two teams were promoted from Primera B Nacional.
- From August 2017 to June 2018, the league was contested by 28 teams. Four teams will be relegated to and two teams will be promoted from Primera B Nacional. This season was also the first "Superliga Argentina", organised by the homonymous entity, that is administered independently and has its own statute. Therefore, the AFA focused exclusively in the Argentina national teams. The 2017–18 season was the first championship organised by the body.
- From August 2018 to June 2019, the Superliga was contested by 26 teams. Four teams were relegated to and two teams were promoted from Primera B Nacional.

=== 2020–present ===
In February 2020, President of AFA Claudio Tapia stated that the Superliga had been established to position Argentine football as a product, but it failed in that purpose. As a result, the AFA would take over the organisation of Primera División championships, according to Tapia's statement. One month after those announcements, the president of the Superliga, Mariano Elizondo, resigned.

The Superliga was replaced by a similar body, named "Liga Profesional de Fútbol", directly linked to AFA and presided by Marcelo Tinelli. It was expected that Superliga was dissolved once the 2020 edition of Copa de la Superliga Argentina finished, but due to the COVID-19 pandemic the cup was cancelled, accelerating times. In May 2020, the LPF was launched by the AFA.

2025 saw the return of Apertura and Clausura tournaments, crowning two champions within the season. The championship also featured a new format (similar to defunct Copa de la Liga Profesional) with clubs divided into two zones and post-season playoffs.

== Division levels ==
Year	Level	Relegation to
1891–1898	1	(None)
1899–1910	1	Segunda División
1911–1926	1	División Intermedia
1927–1932	1	Primera División B
1933–1948	1	Segunda División
1949–1966	1	Primera División B
1967–1986	1	Primera División B Torneo Regional
1986–present	1	Primera B Nacional

== Clubs ==
As of 2024, twenty-eight teams are competing in the league, the 26 teams that took part in the previous season as well as two promoted teams from the 2023 Primera Nacional.

== Champions ==
Since the first championship held in 1891, 30 clubs have won the Primera División title at least once. The list include all the titles won by each club since the first Primera División championship held in 1891. Clubs in italic no longer exist or are currently disaffiliated from the AFA.

Rank	Club	Titles	Winning seasons
1	River Plate	38	1920 AAmF, 1932 LAF, 1936 (Copa Campeonato), 1936 (Copa de Oro), (Note: The Association awarded River Plate both titles, Copa Campeonato and Copa de Oro, as individual titles.) 1937, 1941, 1942, 1945, 1947, 1952, 1953, 1955, 1956, 1957, 1975 Metropolitano, 1975 Nacional, 1977 Metropolitano, 1979 Metropolitano, 1979 Nacional, 1980 Metropolitano, 1981 Nacional, 1985–86, 1989–90, 1991 Apertura, 1993 Apertura, 1994 Apertura, 1996 Apertura, 1997 Apertura, 1997 Clausura, 1999 Apertura, 2000 Clausura, 2002 Clausura, 2003 Clausura, 2004 Clausura, 2008 Clausura, 2014 Final, 2021, 2023
2	Boca Juniors	36	1919, 1920, 1923, 1924, 1926, 1930, 1931 LAF, 1934 LAF, 1935, 1940, 1943, 1944, 1954, 1962, 1964, 1965, 1969 Nacional, 1970 Nacional, 1976 Metropolitano, 1976 Nacional, 1981 Metropolitano, 1992 Apertura, 1998 Apertura, 1999 Clausura, 2000 Apertura, 2003 Apertura, 2005 Apertura, 2006 Clausura, 2008 Apertura, 2011 Apertura, 2015, 2016–17, 2017–18, 2019–20, 2022, 2026 Liga
3	Racing	18	1913, 1914, 1915, 1916, 1917, 1918, 1919 AAmF, 1921 AAmF, 1925 AAmF, 1949, 1950, 1951, 1958, 1961, 1966, 2001 Apertura, 2014, 2018–19
4	Independiente	16	1922 AAmF, 1926 AAmF, 1938, 1939, 1948, 1960, 1963, 1967 Nacional, 1970 Metropolitano, 1971 Metropolitano, 1977 Nacional, 1978 Nacional, 1983 Metropolitano, 1988–1989, 1994 Clausura, 2002 Apertura
5	San Lorenzo	15	1923 AAmF, 1924 AAmF, 1927, 1933 LAF, 1936 (Copa de Honor), 1946, 1959, 1968 Metropolitano, 1972 Metropolitano, 1972 Nacional, 1974 Nacional, 1995 Clausura, 2001 Clausura, 2007 Clausura, 2013 Inicial
6	Vélez Sarsfield	11	1968 Nacional, 1993 Clausura, 1995 Apertura, 1996 Clausura, 1998 Clausura, 2005 Clausura, 2009 Clausura, 2011 Clausura, 2012 Inicial, 2012–13 Superfinal, 2024
7	Alumni	10	1900, (Note: Under the name "English High School AC") 1901, 1902, 1903, 1905, 1906, 1907, 1909, 1910, 1911
8	Estudiantes (LP)	7	1913 FAF, 1967 Metropolitano, 1982 Metropolitano, 1983 Nacional, 2006 Apertura, 2010 Apertura, 2025 Clausura
9	Newell's Old Boys	6	1974 Metropolitano, 1987–88, 1990–91, 1992 Clausura, 2004 Apertura, 2013 Final
10	Huracán	5	1921, 1922, 1925, 1928, 1973 Metropolitano
10	Rosario Central	5	1971 Nacional, 1973 Nacional, 1980 Nacional, 1986–87, 2025 Liga
10	Lomas Athletic	5	1893, 1894, 1895, 1897, 1898
13	Argentinos Juniors	3	1984 Metropolitano, 1985 Nacional, 2010 Clausura
13	Belgrano Athletic	3	1899, 1904, 1908
15	Estudiantil Porteño	2	1931, 1934
15	Ferro Carril Oeste	2	1982 Nacional, 1984 Nacional
15	Lanús	2	2007 Apertura, 2016
15	Porteño	2	1912 FAF, 1914 FAF
15	Quilmes	2	1912, 1978 Metropolitano
20	Arsenal	1	2012 Clausura
20	Banfield	1	2009 Apertura
20	Belgrano	1	2026 Apertura
20	Chacarita Juniors	1	1969 Metropolitano
20	Dock Sud	1	1933
20	Gimnasia y Esgrima (LP)	1	1929
20	Lomas Academy	1	1896
20	Old Caledonians	1	1891
20	Platense	1	2025 Apertura
20	Sportivo Barracas	1	1932
20	St. Andrew's	1	1891

== Top scorers ==
The all-time top scorer of Primera División Argentina is forward Arsenio Erico with 295 goals. Most players on the all-time top scorers table had their golden age before the 1970s, with all of the top five all-time scorers having retired before 1973. The only player retired after that year in the top twenty list is Martín Palermo, who played for Estudiantes (LP) and Boca Juniors in Primera División.

== Media coverage ==
In Argentina, matches are broadcast by American companies ESPN and Turner, which signed a contract for 5 years where both companies agreed to pay A$ 3,200 million per year. Local company Torneos, who was formerly the official broadcaster of the Argentine championship from 1985 until 2009, will take over the content production of the games for Fox and La Corte will handle content production for Turner while Cablevisión, DirecTV and Telecentro will be the TV operators.

Until the agreement with Fox and Turner was signed, Argentine football matches were broadcast nationally by El Trece, Telefe, America TV, and Channel 7. Games were free in Argentina from 2009 to 2016 thanks to the "Fútbol para Todos" (Football for Everyone) program, when the National Government and AFA decided rescind the agreement. The Government paid A$9,500 million for 7 years.

The league attracts television audiences beyond South America, Europe, Africa and MENA. The matches are broadcast in over 80 countries. In Latin America the matches are broadcast live by ESPN (three matches per week), TyC Sports International (all the matches per week) and another streaming platforms like Prende TV, Star+ and Fanatiz (together with AFA Play). In the United States, the matches are streamed on Paramount+ since 2021. BeIN Sports broadcasts the games live in France Dubai Sports broadcasts the games live in MENA regions. ITV showed highlights on a regional basis with the introduction of overnight broadcasting in 1988–89. Channel 5 showed highlights from 1999 to 2003, while Premier Sports showed live games across 2011 and 2012.

In the United States, in the 2004–05 season, ESPN Deportes (instead of Fox Sports networks), broadcast some matches from El Clásico del Domingo (Like other football competitions as Bundesliga, Ligue 1 or Copa Libertadores).
