= Belgrano Athletic Club =

Argentine sports club

Coordinates: 34°34′24.70″S 58°27′47.43″W

(Argentina) Belgrano
- Full name: Belgrano Athletic Club
- Union: URBA
- Nickname: Marrón
- Founded: 17 August 1896; 130 years ago
- Location: Belgrano, Buenos Aires, Argentina
- Ground: Estadio Belgrano Athletic
- President: Marcelo Ruiz
- Coach: Francisco Gradín
- League: Top 14
- 2026: 7th.
1st kit	2nd kit

Official website
- belgranoathletic.club

Belgrano Athletic Club is an Argentine amateur sports club from Belgrano, Buenos Aires. One of Argentina's oldest institutions still in existence, Belgrano was one of the four clubs that founded the Argentine Rugby Union in 1899. The senior team currently competes at Top 12, the first division of the Unión de Rugby de Buenos Aires league system.

Belgrano Athletic was one of the most prominent teams during the first years of football in Argentina, having won three domestic league titles, one national cup and two international cups. Belgrano's arch-rival during those years was Alumni, also from Belgrano neighborhood. Belgrano disaffiliated from the Argentine Association in the late 1910s, focusing on rugby union and other sports. Football is no longer practised at the club.

Belgrano's field hockey team currently takes part of Metropolitano championships organised by the Buenos Aires Hockey Association.

The club's facilities are divided between two locations: its main building (Sede Virrey del Pino) sited in Belgrano and another one located in Pilar (Anexo Pinazo).

Apart from the sports mentioned above, several activities are practised at the club nowadays, such as bowls, contract bridge, cricket, squash, swimming, and tennis.

== History ==
=== The beginning: Football ===
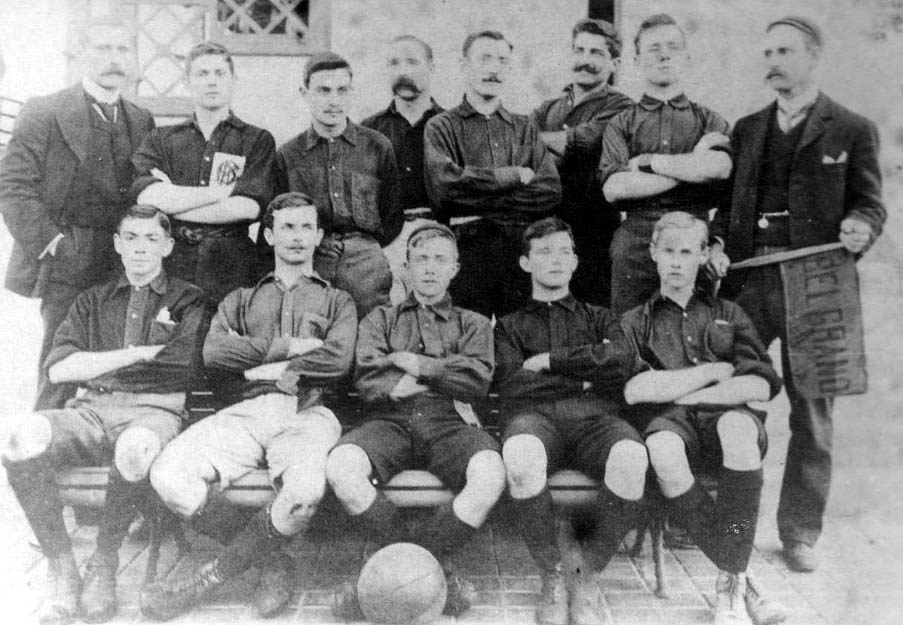
The 1902 Belgrano football team

The club was formed from the merger of Buenos Aires and Rosario Railway A.C. and St. Lawrence Club (a neighbour institution which had been formed shortime ago) on 17 August 1896. The recently created "Belgrano Athletic Club" took over the land (and field) rented by the BA&RR on Virrey del Pino and Superí to set their headquarters.

Belgrano AC participated in the Primera División from 1896 to 1916. The squad won three league titles in 1899, 1904 and 1908, and also won a number of other tournaments including domestic cup Copa de Honor and international competitions Tie Cup (in 1900) and Copa de Honor Cousenier (1907).

Belgrano Athletic played one of the earliest football rivalries against Belgrano neighbours Alumni, the most successful team of Argentine until its dissolution in 1911. Both teams were so strong that they won all of the thirteen league titles contested between 1899 and 1911 (that was the last year of Alumni football team competing in Argentine league, being officially dissolved in 1913).

Belgrano AC would achieve a historic victory over River Plate, defeating the Millonario 10–1 in 1912. That was the worst defeat of River Plate in club's history.

Despite being one of the most notable football teams during the first years of that sport in Argentina, Belgrano was relegated from the Argentine Primera División, along with Quilmes in 1916.

Belgrano never returned to the first division, and the club later disaffiliated from the Argentine Association, focusing on the practise of other sports, mainly rugby union.

=== Rugby union ===
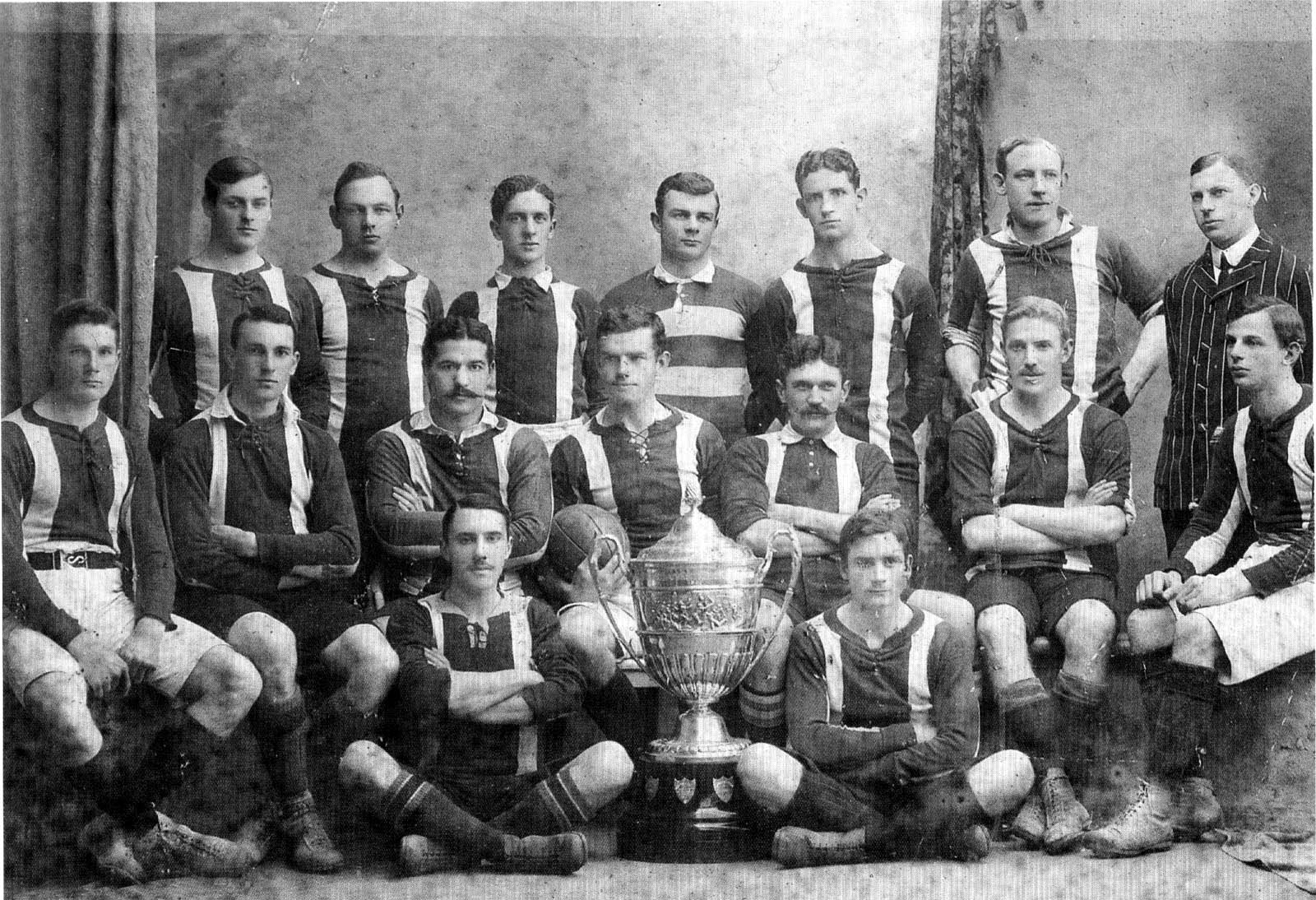
The Belgrano Athletic rugby union team that won its first championship in 1907

Belgrano Athletic rugby union team is one of the most successful teams in the Unión de Rugby de Buenos Aires, having won a total of 10 provincial titles. In 1899, along with club Buenos Aires, Lomas, Flores and Rosario AC, Belgrano became a founding member of the "River Plate Rugby Championship", the origin of today's Argentine Rugby Union.

The first title obtained in rugby union was in 1907, playing 16 matches with 13 victories, 1 drew and only 2 lost. The team scored 233 points and only received 29 at the end of the tournament. That same year the club built the stadium's grandstands (commonly made of woods by the time) with a capacity of 600. In 1909 the Government of Argentina approved the statute (rules) of the club. Its main rivals are Belgrano district's other big club, Alumni. In 2016, Belgrano won its 11° URBA championship after 48 years without league titles. Belgrano defeated former champion Hindú at the final, played in San Isidro.

=== Field hockey ===
Belgrano is founding member of the Argentine Hockey Association, established in 1908. The club has more than 400 registered female players that are part of 25 teams. Club teams play their home matches at the two artificial turf pitches in Sede Pinazo, while the Virrey del Pino Field is used only for training sessions.

== Team image ==
=== Uniform evolution ===
It is believed that the first Belgrano A.C. football squad wore black (or dark grey) and gold shirts, as they were depicted in early team photos. In 1907 the club adopted the Buenos Aires and Rosario Railway corporate colours (red, green and silver) as most of the club members were employees of that company. In 1919 Belgrano A.C. changed its colours again, adopting the brown (specifying "chocolate" tone according to the statute of that time) and gold of the FC Central Argentino's coaches.

==== Football ====
1896–1907	1907–16 (Note: This uniform has been worn as the away kit by the rugby team, as a tribute to the football squad of the club)

==== Rugby ====
1896–1919	1919–present

== Venue ==
Belgrano's home venue (popularly known as "Virrey del Pino" because of its location on Virrey del Pino and Superí streets in Belgrano) host rugby and cricket match. After some time playing on Pampa and Melián streets, the club acquired that land in 1902 to two of its members, Charles Dickinson (who was also a notable footballer of the club) and Roberts.

The first grandstands were built with wood from surplus railway material. By 1910, the field had an official grandstand, with roof, named "Donald Forester", which has remained up to present days.

== Honours ==
=== Cricket ===
- Primera División (45): 1902–03, 1905–06, 1906–07, 1907–08, 1908–09, 1910–11, 1911–12, 1914–15, 1918–19, 1923–24, 1925–26, 1926–27, 1928–29, 1929–30, 1931–32, 1932–33, 1953–54, 1954–55, 1955–56, 1958–59, 1961–62, 1965–66, 1967–68, 1968–69, 1969–70, 1970–71, 1973–74, 1974–75, 1980–81, 1981–82, 1983–84, 1984–85, 1988–89, 1989–90, 1991–92, 1997–98, 2001–02, 2005–06, 2010–11, 2013–14, 2015–16, 2019–20, 2020–21, 2021–22, 2022–23

=== Football ===
==== National ====
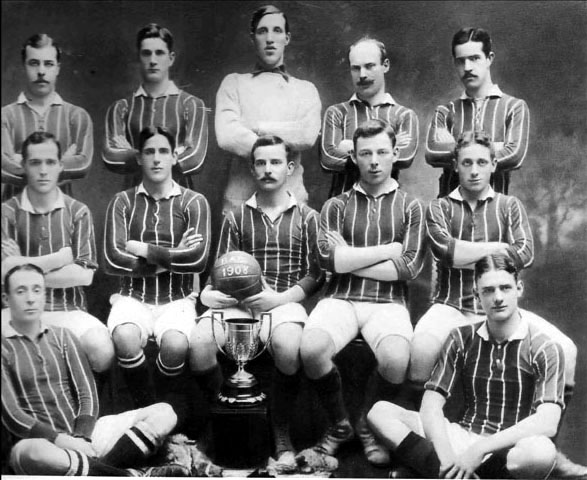
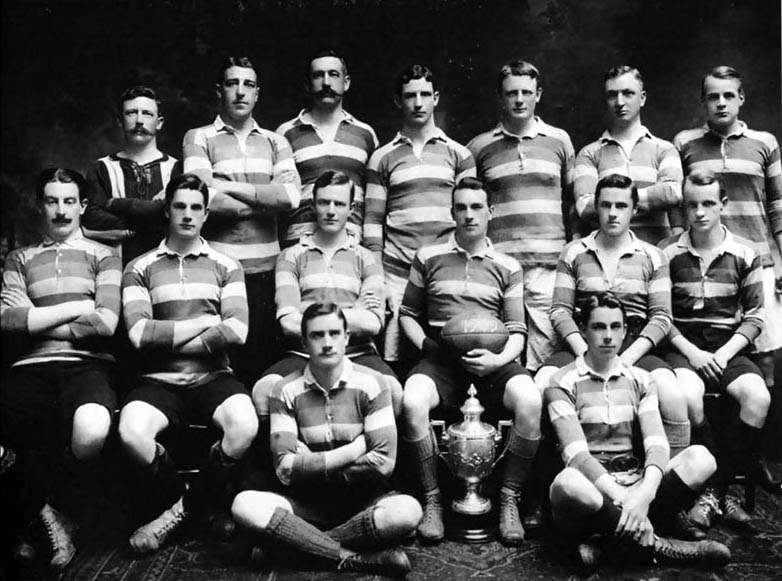
(Left): the football squad that won the 1908 Primera División title; (right): the rugby team of 1909, posing with their trophies
- Primera División (3): 1899, 1904, 1908
- Copa Honor MCBA (1): 1907

==== International ====
- Tie Cup (1): 1900
- Copa de Honor Cousenier (1): 1907

=== Rugby union ===
- Torneo de la URBA (11): 1907, 1910, 1914, 1921, 1936, 1940, 1963, 1966, 1967, 1968, 2016

=== Field hockey ===
Women's

- Metropolitano Primera División (4): 1942, 1946, 1949, 1974

== Notable athletes ==
- Charles Edgard Dickinson, former football captain that scored the first Argentina national team goal ever in an official match. It was against Uruguay on 20 July 1902. Argentina won 6–0.
- Arturo Forrester, the first Argentine footballer to score against a British team. It was in the match v Southampton FC, when the English side toured on South America in 1904.
- A.C. Addecott, former football captain.
- Arnold Watson Hutton (1911–14), forward, previously in Alumni, also international with Argentina.
- Jeannette Campbell, silver medalist swimmer at the 1936 Olympics.
- Lisandro Arbizu, rugby union footballer for Los Pumas.
- Magdalena Aicega, field hockey captain of Las Leonas.
- Rosario Luchetti, field hockey player of Las Leonas.
