= 1906 Alumni v South Africa football match =

Association football match

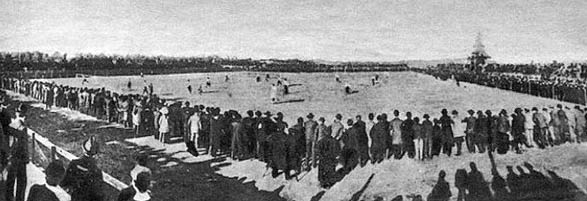
- The Sociedad Sportiva Argentina stadium, venue of the match, pictured during the game
- Event: British football clubs tours to South America
Alumni	South Africa
(Argentina)	(Cape Colony)
1	0
- Date: 24 June 1906
- Venue: Sociedad Sportiva, Buenos Aires
- Referee: Guillermo Jordán
- Attendance: 12,000
- Weather: 10 °C (50 °F)

The 1906 association football match between the South African national team and the Argentine club Alumni AC marked the South American nation's first victory over a team not from the continent. It was the second game of South Africa's 1906 tour of the Americas and took place on 27 April at the Sociedad Sportiva Argentina stadium, known unofficially as the Stadium of Palermo, in Buenos Aires. The home team were considered underdogs in the eyes of the general public; South Africa had humiliated a group a university students 0–14 and their footballing level at the time was similar to the English teams that had thrashed Alumni years prior.

With an attendance of 12,000 that included Argentine president José Figueroa Alcorta, Alumni's Ernesto Brown had to exit early the game in the fifteenth minute after having issues with his leg; opposing captain Henry Heeley allowed for him to be substitutioned. South Africa's W. Mason missed a one-a-one situation versus goalkeeper José Laforia ten minutes. Throughout the first half, play was mostly dominated by the away team as the Argentine side, known for their use of the 2–3–5 formation, was forced to play defensively. It was until the second half, where the home team launched an attack, which ended in a goal by forward Alfredo Brown after an individual play by Guillermo Weiss.

The underdog's triumph was greatly praised by Argentine newspaper and magazines, who considered it to be an inspiration and marking point for the future of the sport inside the South American nation. Heeley expressed a great shock to the result; a loss to Alumni was completely unexpected for the South African team, who later went on to win the rest of their remaining eleven matches of the tour.

== Background ==
In 1906, the Argentine Football Association (AFA) invited the South African Football Association (SAFA), both recently reaffiliated to the Football Association (The FA), to tour South America after the dismissal of previous plans to tour England. The SAFA sent an amateur national squad, conprising of seven South Africans and eight British men captained by Henry Heeley, to tour the Argentine, Uruguayan, and Brazilian nations between the months of June and July. They disputed their first game on 22 June in the city of Rosario, Argentina versus the "Universitarios" side, crushing them 0–14. Despite the fact that they weren't professional, the South Africans, who frequented a possession based tactic, presented a quality similar to the likes of the teams that previously toured in the nation. The tourists then moved on to face Alumni Athletic Club following the triumph, who started the 1906 Argentine Primera División as victorious of three consecutives matches versus Argentino de Quilmes, Belgrano Extra, and Belgrano Athletic Club.

Founded in 1893 as the Buenos Aires English High School's football division, Alumni dominated the early 1900s inside Argentine football, imposing itself as the nation's hegemonic power. El Primer Grande had accumulated nine domestic competitions by 1905, including a run of four consecutive league titles that ended in the year that came beforehand. While this was happening, English sides Southampton and Nottingham Forest toured the River Plate region in 1904 and 1905 respectively in events that benefited the growth of the sport in the Argentine nation. Throughout their tours, both British clubs maintained perfect records, comfortably defeating local Argentine and Uruguayan sides as well as league selection teams. Meanwhile, Alumni achieved the most competitive result during Southampton's visit, falling 3–0 on 26 June, and posted the third-best performance during Nottingham Forest's tour, whose encounter at the time versus the English team became the most viewed sporting event in South America.

== Match ==
=== Pre-match ===
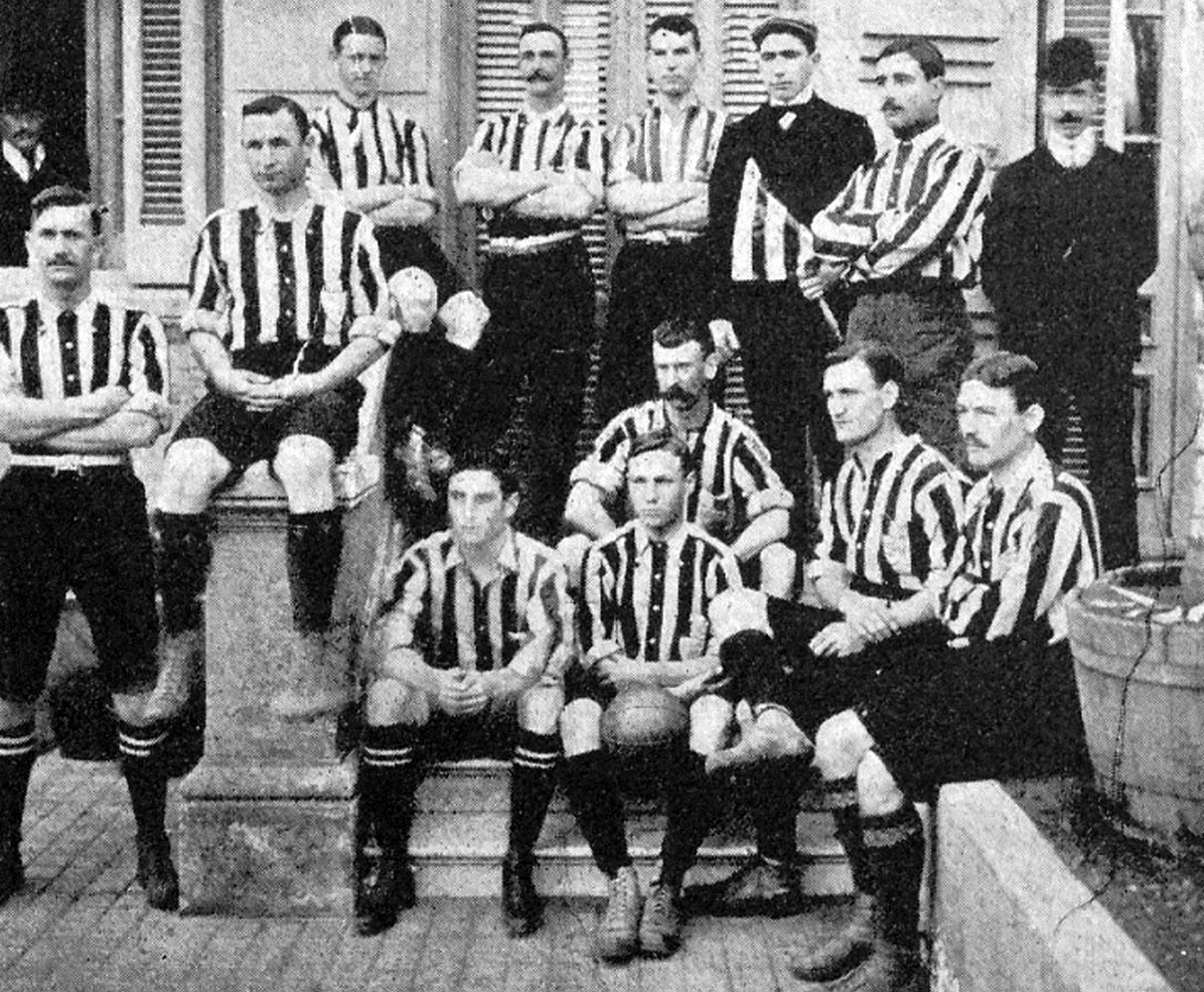
Alumni team for the match

South African team for the match

The venue chosen for the match played on 24 June 1906 was the stadium owned by the Sociedad Sportiva Argentina, commonly known as the Stadium of Palermo, which served as the host for all of the tour's Buenos Aires fixtures. Like with other major stadiums, it had previously been used in several matches of the tours of British teams to South America.

On the sporting side, Argentine referee Guillermo A. Jordán was selected to officiate the match, a retired Alumni player who participated in the team for eight years before his career was cut short from a career ending injury in 1900. Meanwhile, the goalkeeper of the home side, José Buruca Laforia, was reported to be ill the day prior to the fixture.

Public opinion favored the visitors; most of the general public dismissed the possibility of an Alumni victory—still, it was greatly anticipated by Argentine fanatics as a crowd of at least 12,000 came to see the event that included the eyes Argentine President José Figueroa Alcorta, far exceeding expectations. Alcorta's presence in the stands of the venue marked the second time in Argentine history that an active head of state had attended a football dispute, the first being Julio Argentino Roca at Alumni's 1904 match versus Southampton. Jonathan Wilson in his 2016 book, Angels with Dirty Faces: How Argentinian Soccer Defined a Nation and Changed the Game Forever, considered it to be the most substantial game played in the South American nation since the sport was first introduced to them in 1867.

=== Summary ===
==== First half ====
Both teams lined-up in 2–3–5 formations, a system for which Alumni was particularly known for. The home team fielded its usual line-up, which included Laforia, who was selected as the starting goalkeeper despite his illness. Meanwhile, South Africa named the same squad that had defeated the university side 14–0, with the exception of forward Harold Henman.

At 2.15 pm, Jordán started the contest following the pre-match ceremonies. In the day's noon, Buenos Aires was predicted to have a temperature of 10°C (50°F) in the date of the event along with perils of rain throughout daytime, which ultimately didn't occur. An early chance in the game was awarded to the away team as Alumni captain Jorge Brown conceded a corner kick, which was wasted following a weak shot that Laforia was able to save effortlessly. Shortly thereafter, the tourists led another attack on the Argentines, but was cut short by Alumni midfielder Guillermo Weiss, who intercepted the Heeley's play and launched a counter-attack towards South Africa's side of the pitch. Weiss pressed forward and unleashed a long-range strike at W. G. Brown, which the South African goalkeeper managed to save. The underdog side continued to attack against their rivals, Weiss threatened once more when he produced another effort that struck the post before bouncing out for a goal kick.

Heeley proposing Ernesto Brown's substitution to Jordán

In the fifthteen minute, following Weiss' attempt, a setback for Alumni was suffered consequential to forward Ernesto Brown's accident during an attack inside the opposing penalty area, costing him a leg injury. He had been anguished by leg pain in the several league matches in which he played before the match, his injury forced the home team to temporally continue playing with ten players until his return to the field. However, Ernesto was unable to return to the game due to his physical state. Heeley took notice of Alumni's disadvantage and suggested a substitution to Jordán with means to letting the opposing team play with eleven players, which the judge accepted. (Note: The International Football Association Board first introduced subtitutions in 1957, 51 years after the match. However, they only applied for players who got injured or became unable to play during a match.)

Following the resumption of the match, Eliseo Brown led another attack for Alumni with an individual play, getting past the opposing captain before rushing a high cross to Weiss, which was ultimately intercepted by Robison. The South Africans responded as they launched a similar attack, J. Mc Intyre crossed the ball to Thorne who would shot wide and miss Laforia's goal. Juan D. Brown entered into the playing area to take the place of Ernesto in the 24th minute, following Heeley's request. In his first minute on the pitch, Juan attempted an individual attack, eventually cut short by an interception from Robinson who promptly passed to W. Mason to initiate a South African counterattack. As Mason approached the penalty area, Laforia charged off his line to clear the ball, conceding a corner kick in the process. Gerald Hartigan delivered the set piece, which was initially cleared by the Alumni defense before falling to forward R. P. Thorne. Thorne's resulting strike was saved by Laforia, sparking a scramble between him and South African attackers attempted to turn in the rebound before Laforia secured the ball to deny the opener. In their match report, La Prensa argued that Ernesto's injury damaged the balance in play between both teams and led the away team to dominate the remaining minutes of the first half.

==== Second half ====
Possession of the ball during the first minutes following the start of the second half mostly occurred at the centre of the playing area, which didn't prompt any attacks from both teams. As the half progressed, Alumni carried off several attacks into the South African side of the pitch. Weiss led an offence with a long individual run down the flank before launching a precise cross to his fellow forwards, which was cut short by Heeley. Following the failed attack, forward Carlos Lett dribbled past the South African defensive line to unleash a shot that would eventually be off its target. Nonetheless, Eliseo continued the attack and forced Heeley to concede a corner kick, which the tourists successfully cleared. South Africa subsequently earned a corner kick of their own; despite Mc Intyre's quality delivery, the set-piece wasn't able to threat the home team.

Guillermo Weiss dribbling past J. Robison before assisting Alfredo Brown in the only goal of the match

In the 61st minute, Weiss launched an attack towards the South African side: he dribbled past their defence and positioned himself towards the middle to make a pass to Alfredo Brown, who faked his shot, tricking W.G. Brown to position himself to the right and allowing him to shoot to the left post and score. Eight minutes after the opener, Tyler delivered a shot towards Alumni's goal as Laforia is able to deflect it, which resulted in a scramble in front of his goal; to avoid an equalizer, he decides to give a corner, which proves to be unsuccessful.

In a contemporary report, an unknown journalist wrote that it would be difficult to explain the overwhelming emotion shown in the stands following Alfredo's goal. Alumni was able to hold on to this result, giving Argentina their first win against a foreign team.

=== Details ===
Friendly match
24 June 1906

Alumni (Argentina)	1–0	South Africa
A. Brown 61'	Report

Sociedad Sportiva, Buenos Aires
Attendance: 12,000
Referee: (Argentina) Guillermo Jordán

Alumni	South Africa

GK	José Buruca Laforia
DF	Carlos Carr Brown
DF	Jorge Brown (c)
MF	Andrés Mack
MF	Carlos Buchanan
MF	Patricio Browne
FW	Guillermo Weiss
FW	Alfredo Brown
FW	Ernesto Brown	(substituted off) 15'
FW	Carlos Lett
FW	Eliseo Brown
Substitutes:
DF	Juan D. Brown	(substituted on) 15'

GK	W.G. Brown
DF	Henry Heeley (c)
DF	J. Robison
MF	W. Schmidt
MF	J. B. Binckes
MF	T. Chalmers
FW	J. Mc Intyre
FW	R. Tyler
FW	R. P. Thorne
FW	W. Mason
FW	Gerald Hartigan

== Post-match ==
Pitch invasion by fanatics following the home team's triumph

Following the match's ending, fans swarmed onto the playing area and carried the winning players off the field. President Alcorta met the captains of both sides, Jorge and Heeley, and congratulated them for their performances in the ptich. Alumni's secretary, P. B. Browne, publicly thanked Heeley on behalf of the club for his good sportmanship after permitting Ernesto Brown's substitution.

=== Reactions and reception ===
Alumni's triumph over South Africa was celebrated by La Nación, who praised the performance displayed by the Alumni players and called it a "memory [that will] remain with us all for a long time to come, serving as an [..] inspiration for the future". The Standard agreed, as they argued that the victory made the future of Argentine football promising. Caras y Caretas echoed the sentiment of the popular voice that eulogized the heroic actions of the team, saying that they couldn't help but agree. while P.B.T described the contest as one of the best to be played in the venue. The Buenos Aires Herald disagreed with these opinions nonetheless, as they believed that the victory was only a stroke of luck.

Moreover, the event was considered by the public as a moment of national pride, which had also caught the attention of the non-sporting side of the country. Alfredo Brown, scorer of the only goal of the match, later told that the foreign team was much better than them and that Laforia was the one who won the match for Alumni, calling him "unbeatable, [...] incredible, extraordinary". Heeley, in an interview following the aftermath of the game, expressed his shock for the result, as they expected to walk out with a comfortable win. In 1923, journalist Ernesto Escobar Bavio praised the ability of Alumni's midfield to connect with its forward line. He also noted the solidity of the victorious team's defence, praising both Carlos and Jorge Brown. On the opposing side, La Prensa spoke negatively of South Africa's attacking, but still praised their defence and midfield, noting of the likes of Heeley, J. Robisin, and T. Chalmers for their mesmerizing grade with the ball.

=== Sporting aftermath ===
South Africa went on to win the rest of their twelve matches of their tour of the Americas, in total winning eleven with 60 goals scored and only seven conceded, Alumni the only team that could beat them. Nevertheless, the two teams would meet again a month later, where the South Africans managed to get their revenge after defeating Alumni 2–0. The success of this trip, along with an increase of white South African identity following the Second Boer War, led the SAFA to withdraw its affiliation to the FA and, according to scholar Chris Bolsmann, position itself at the front globalized football in the first years of the 20th century. On the otherhand, the Argentines finished the year with a great season, as they won all plausible tournaments, including the league championship, where they suffered only one defeat throughout the entire year. Henman moved to Argentina following the end of the trip, he continued his footballing career at Alumni and the Argentine national team in the same year of the defeat.

It would be until 1914, eight years later, that another Argentine team would win against another non-South American team; as a combined team beat Exeter City 1–0. Wilson noted the significance of the 1906 match again; he argued that the victory was major breakthrough in the development of football in Argentina, at a sporting level.

== Bibliography ==
Iwanczuk, J. (1992). Historia del Fútbol Amateur en la Argentina. Buenos Aires, Argentina: Centro para la Investigación de la Historia del Fútbol.
- Bolsmann, C. (2010). South African football tours at the turn of the twentieth century: amateurs, pioneers and profits. African Historical Review, 42(1), 91–112. https://doi.org/10.1080/17532523.2010.483810
- Beck, P. J. (2025). Chapter 4: The Football Association changes direction on foreign tours, the 1900s. Soccer & Society, 26(7), 1127–1148. https://doi.org/10.1080/14660970.2025.2547137
- Wilson, J. (2016). Angels with Dirty Faces: How Argentinian Soccer Defined a Nation and Changed the Game Forever. Unites States: PublicAffairs.
- Bolsmann, C. (2010). White football in South Africa: empire, apartheid and change, 1892-1977. Soccer & Society, 11(1/2), 29–45. https://doi.org/10.1080/14660970903331318
- Daskal, R. (2011). La Sociedad Sportiva Argentina y su terreno, historia de una disputa. National University of La Plata. https://historiapolitica.com/datos/biblioteca/daskal2.pdf
- Gaffney, C. (2009). Stadiums and society in twenty-first century Buenos Aires. Soccer & Society, 10(2), 160–182. https://doi.org/10.1080/14660970802601647
- Escobar Bavio, E. (1923). El football en el Rio de la Plata. Argentina: Ed. Sports. https://drive.google.com/file/d/1QhiMyyjsMUL-2tLGLVcCpGiMA3q8e0-l/
- Escobar Bavio, E. (1953). Alumni: cuna de campeones y escuela de hidalguía. Argentina: Editorial Difusìón.
- Wilson, J. (2008). Inverting the Pyramid: A History of Football Tactics. United Kingdom: Orion.
