= Brown family (Argentina) =

Scottish-Argentine association football family

Brown
- Current region: Buenos Aires, Argentina
- Origin: Argentina
- Members: Jorge, Alfredo, Carlos, Eliseo, Ernesto, Juan Domingo

The Brown family is an Argentine family of Scottish descent known for producing a number of high-profile footballers during the 1920s in Argentina.

== Arrival in Argentina ==
On 22 May 1825, James Brown, Sr., a farm labourer, and his wife Mary (née Hope) left Leith, Scotland to start a new life in Argentina. On arriving in Argentina, the Browns settled in the short-lived British settlement of Monte Grande before moving to Buenos Aires after the failure of the settlement.

== Footballing dynasty ==
Four members of the Brown family played in the Alumni 1909 championship-winning team: Carlos Carr (back row, second from left), Diego (back row, second from right), Tomás (middle row, second from left), and Ernesto (middle row, fourth from left)

James Brown Jr., the youngest son of James and Mary, fathered nine sons, seven of whom became footballers for Alumni Athletic Club. Five of those seven would also play internationally for Argentina. The eldest son to play football was Diego Hope (b. 1875). The next oldest, Jorge Gibson (b. 1880, nicknamed el Patricarcho) was the most accomplished member of the family. He would play in ten Argentine championships and represent Argentina 23 times. Jorge was treasurer of Alumni at the point it was disbanded. Jorge played in Argentina's first international in a match against Uruguay in Montevideo. The next oldest, Carlos Carr Brown (b. 1882), was the first to make an impact on Argentine football. Carlos learned his football in Britain before returning to Argentina and representing the national team twice. Tomás (b. 1884) turned out for Alumni but was not capped internationally. Ernesto Alejandro (b. 1885; nicknamed el Pacifico for his peaceful nature) once scored six goals in a match for Alumni. The two youngest, Alfredo (b. 1886) and Eliseo (b. 1888), also played international football.

A cousin of the brothers, Juan Domingo, also played for Argentina during the same era. Between 1906 and 1916 Juan played 36 times for the national team.

In 1910 when Argentina played Uruguay in the Copa Centenario Revolución de Mayo, three Browns played for Argentina: Jorge, Juan Domingo and Ernesto.

== Family tree ==
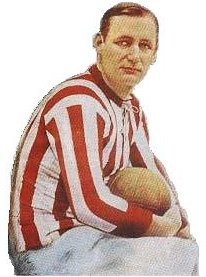
Jorge Gibson Brown

James Brown, Sr.	Mary Hope
James Brown, Jr.	Unknown
Diego Hope Brown	Jorge Gibson Brown	Carlos Carr Brown	Tomás Brown	Ernesto Alejandro Brown	Alfredo Brown	Eliseo Brown	Unknown	Unknown	Juan Domingo Brown
