= Henry Heeley =

Personal information
- Full name: Henry Norman Heeley
- Date of birth: 1 February 1879
- Place of birth: Pietermaritzburg, Cape Colony
- Date of death: 14 January 1953 (aged 73)

International career
Years	Team	Apps	(Gls)
—	South Africa	—	(—)

Henry Norman Heeley (1 February 1879 – 14 January 1953) was an amateur South African footballer, who captained the national team during their 1906 tour of South America.

Born in Pietermaritzburg, he played most of his adult football career in the city of Johannesburg. In the second match of the tour versus Alumni, he was praised by the Argentine media for allowing the substitution of Ernesto Brown. Following the end of that match, he, and Alumni's captain Jorge Brown, met Argentine president José Figueroa Alcorta.
