= British football clubs tours to South America =

Tours of British football clubs (1904–1929)

- Date: 1904–1929
- Duration: 25 years
- Venue: Various
- Location: Argentina Uruguay Brazil
- Type: Exhibition games
- Theme: Association football
- First reporter: 26 Jun 1904
- Participants: 12 British clubs plus several South American sides

British football clubs tours over South America contributed to the spread and develop of football in the region during the first years of the 20th century. The first club to tour on the region was Southampton F.C. in 1904, followed by several teams (mainly from England although some Scottish clubs also visited South America) until 1929 with Chelsea F.C. being the last team to tour.

During those 25 years of tours, British teams' performances were decreasing while the South American squads' style of playing improved. Indeed, Southampton won all of their matches in 1904 with 40 goals scored in 1904 while Chelsea was defeated eight times (over 16 games played) in their 1929 tour.

== Background ==
Football (and other British-origin sports like rugby union) were gaining popularity in Argentina and Uruguay and the associations brought foreign teams to their countries as a way of encourage the practise of the sport among the large number of enthusiasts. In fact, Argentine Primera División was the first football league outside of the British Isles, having been held since 1891 to the present.

British teams were considered the best in the world by then, and some of them served as inspiration to establish football clubs in Argentina and Uruguay, helped by the immigration of British citizens that had arrived to work for British companies (mostly in railway construction). CURCC (in Uruguay), Belgrano A.C., Rosario A.C., Alumni and Quilmes (in Argentina) are some examples of clubs established by British immigrants to South America.

Football had been introduced many years ago in both countries, being the first game played in Argentina on June 20, 1867, with the establishment of Buenos Aires Football Club, the first football club not only in Argentina but in South America. In Uruguay, football had been introduced in 1870. Argentina organised its first league championship, Primera División, in 1891 while its Uruguayan homonymous held its first championship in 1900.

Both countries considered themselves rivals due to their proximity. Moreover, they had the only organised bodies in South America and had held some earlier competitions such as Tie Cup (1900) or Copa de Honor Cousenier (1905), played by champions of each association.

In some cases, the influence of British clubs on Argentine football extended to the colours adopted by some clubs. Arístides Langone, president of Club Atlético Independiente, was so impressed by the Nottingham Forest squad that beat local Alumni by 6–0 that he suggested to change the jersey colours from white and blue to red. The request was approved and Independiente adopted the colour that would later become an identity mark for the club, being known as El Rojo (The Red).

Some versions also state that Quilmes A.C. was another institution that took the colours from a British squad, in this case the white jersey with blue details of the England national team, although there is no evidence to prove that statement.

== Tours ==
Southampton F.C. was the first foreign club to tour South America, followed by Nottingham Forest F.C. in 1905. One of its games, against Alumni in Buenos Aires, was attended by 10,000 spectators, what proves the interest of Argentine fans to see the local forces facing British sides, considered technically superior by them.

The first team to defeat a British side was Argentine Alumni, who defeated the South Africa team (mostly composed of British–origin players) by 1–0 at Sociedad Sportiva Argentina stadium in Palermo. The relevance of the victory was expressed by local media, such as La Nación writing: "For our national football, the Alumni v South Africa match was a great triumph that will be remembered for a long time in everyone's memory, serving as example and stimulus for the future", while British-origin newspaper The Standard wrote "it was a glorious victory and what happened in La Sportiva is promising for Argentine football".

Corinthian F.C. of London was the first British club to tour Brazil in 1910, playing ten games in the cities of Rio de Janeiro and São Paulo. The team inspired a group of railway workers to establish a club which they named after the British team, therefore S.C. Corinthians was founded in September 1910.

Corinthian F.C. would return to Brazil in 1913, becoming the only British team that toured South America twice.

Exeter City was the first British team to play beyond Argentina and Uruguay when they reached Brazil to play a series of friendly matches in Rio de Janeiro (most of them v. local combined teams), finishing their tour on July 21, 1914, when Exeter played Brazil national team, in which was the first match ever played by the scratch.

Nevertheless, newspapers in Argentina were left disappointed with City's performances during the tour. Tribuna describing them as "the most mediocre team of professionals sent out by the FA from the home of football", and the Buenos Aires Herald complaining that the Grecians were not "sufficiently superior".

Plymouth Argyle thrashed the Uruguay national team 4–0 in their first game (Uruguay went on to win the first ever World Cup just six years later) before pulling off another shock by beating Argentina 1–0. Plymouth Argyle was the team that faced Argentina most times, with 4 matches played between both squads.

The visit of Plymouth Argyle will be best remembered by the outstanding personality and genius of Moses Russell. His effective style, precise judgement, accurate and timely clearances, powerful kicking and no less useful work with his head...one of the most wonderful backs and one of the brainiest players ever seen on the football field.

— The Standard, British newspaper published in Buenos Aires, at the end of the Plymouth Argyle tour.

In the match against Boca Juniors on 9 July 1924, the Boca Juniors supporters invaded the pitch after their team had scored the opening goal and carried all eleven home players shoulder high around the stadium. After a half hour delay, the referee restarted the match, but a further invasion was sparked when the referee awarded a penalty against the home side. When the match was again restarted, the Argyle players had agreed that Patsy Corcoran would take the spot-kick and miss, to prevent another pitch invasion. However, the ultra-competitive Russell was not prepared to accept this, and just before Corcoran was about to take the penalty he was pushed aside by Russell who took it himself and scored. This prompted a further pitch invasion by the Boca fans and this time the match was abandoned.

Chelsea F.C. was the last British club to tour South America, in 1929. Since the first tour in 1904, the South American players had evolved a lot, as they were described as "true masters in tactical play" by Chelsea chairman Kirby himself. He also remarked the style and ball control on offer, perhaps a consequence of the outstanding sporting facilities many of the amateur teams possessed. The evolution of South American football was also evident in the tour results: of 16 games played during their three months tour, Chelsea only won five, with eight loses. On the other hand, the Chelsea players emphasised the "unfair play" of some Argentine players and the violent surrounding atmosphere of the supporters in Argentina. The Chelsea management complained to the Football Association that "non-observance of the laws of the game hindered real football".

Some players that were part of British teams touring South America, would then hired as coaches in the continent. Walter Bull of Totenham Hotspur went to Argentina, John Harley to Uruguay (he died there in 1959) while John Hamilton went to Brazil in 1907, becoming the first professional coach in the country.

== List of British clubs by year of tour ==
Countries visited indicated in each case:

- ✓ Toured
- ✗ Not toured

Team	Year	Arg	Uru	Bra	Source
Southampton	1904	✓	✓	✗	
Nottingham Forest	1905	✓	✓	✗	
South Africa F.A.	1906	✓	✓	✓	
Everton	1909	✓	✓	✗	
Tottenham Hotspur	1909	✓	✓	✗	
Corinthian	1910	✗	✗	✓	
Swindon Town	1912	✓	✓	✗	
Corinthian	1913	✗	✗	✓	
Exeter City	1914	✓	✓	✓	
Third Lanark	1923	✓	✓	✗	
Plymouth Argyle	1924	✓	✓	✗	
Motherwell	1928	✓	✓	✓	
Chelsea	1929	✓	✓	✓	

== Matches details (by club) ==
Complete list of visitors and games played in Argentina, Uruguay and Brazil.

Indicates British clubs defeats.

=== Southampton ===
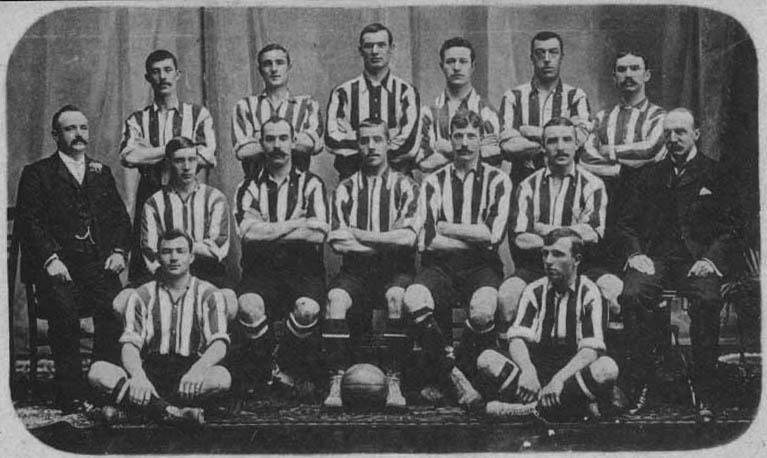
Southampton, the first British club to arrive, in 1904

Southampton
Date	Rival	Score	Venue
26 Jun 1904	(Argentina) Alumni	3–0	Sociedad Sportiva
3 Jul 1904	(Argentina) Británicos (Note: British-origin footballers that played in the Argentine domestic league)	10–0	Sociedad Sportiva
6 Jul 1904	(Argentina) Belgrano A.C.	6–1	Sociedad Sportiva
9 Jul 1904	Argentina	8–0	Sociedad Sportiva
10 Jul 1904	Liga Argentina (Note: All-star team from the Argentine domestic league)	5–3	Sociedad Sportiva
14 Jul 1904	(Uruguay) Liga Uruguaya (Note: All-star team from the Uruguay domestic league)	8–1	Parque Central

Balance
Pl	W	D	L	Gs	Gc
6	6	0	0	40	5

=== Nottingham Forest ===
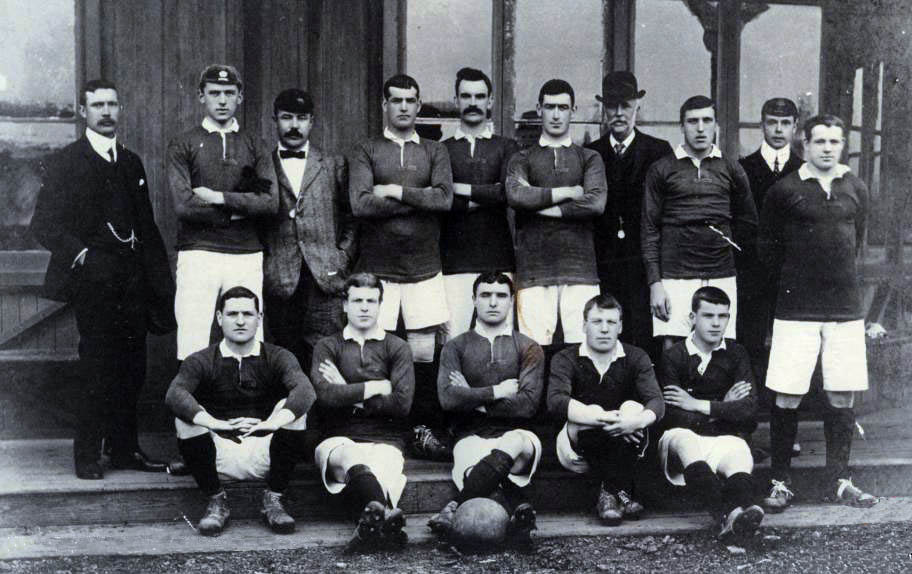
Nottingham Forest team that played in Rosario, 16 June 1905

Nottingham Forest
Date	Rival	Score	Venue
11 Jun 1905	(Uruguay) CURCC	6–1	Parque Central
16 Jun 1905	(Argentina) Rosario Combined (Note: Team composed of players of Rosario Central and Rosario A.C.)	5–3	Plaza Jewell
18 Jun 1905	(Argentina) Belgrano A.C.	7–0	Sociedad Sportiva
22 Jun 1905	(Argentina) Británicos	13–1	Sociedad Sportiva
24 Jun 1905	(Argentina) Rosario Combined	6–0	Sociedad Sportiva
25 Jun 1905	(Argentina) Alumni	6–0	Sociedad Sportiva
29 Jun 1905	Argentina	5–0	Sociedad Sportiva
2 Jul 1905	Liga Argentina	9–1	Sociedad Sportiva

Balance
Pl	W	D	L	Gs	Gc
8	8	0	0	57	6

=== South Africa ===
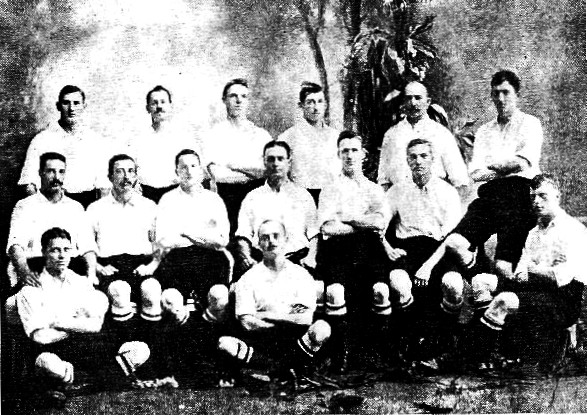
The South Africa team of 1906

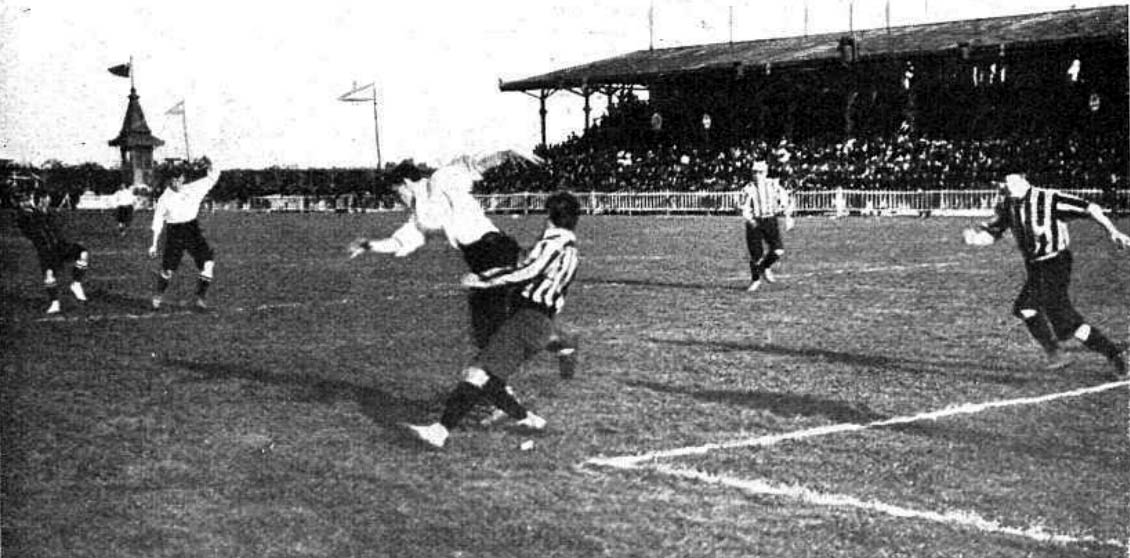
South Africa playing Alumni in Buenos Aires, 1906

South Africa F.A.
Date	Rival	Score	Venue
22 Jun 1906	(Argentina) "Universitarios" (Note: Team formed for University students)	14–0	Sociedad Sportiva
24 Jun 1906	(Argentina) Alumni	0–1	Sociedad Sportiva
29 Jun 1906	(Argentina) Belgrano A.C.	6–0	Sociedad Sportiva
1 Jul 1906	(Argentina) Liga Rosarina	9–0	Plaza Jewell
8 Jul 1906	(Argentina) "Británicos"	4–1	Sociedad Sportiva
9 Jul 1906	Argentina	1–0	Sociedad Sportiva
12 Jul 1906	(Argentina) Estudiantes (BA)	3–2	Sociedad Sportiva
15 Jul 1906	Liga Argentina	4–1	Sociedad Sportiva
18 Jul 1906	(Uruguay) Liga Uruguaya	6–1	Parque Central
22 Jul 1906	(Argentina) Alumni	2–0	Sociedad Sportiva
26 Jul 1906	(Argentina) Quilmes	5–1	Sociedad Sportiva
31 Jul 1906	(Brazil) Combinado Brasileiro (Note: All-star team from the São Paulo state league)	6–0	Velódromo

Balance
Pl	W	D	L	Gs	Gc
12	11	0	1	60	7

=== Everton ===
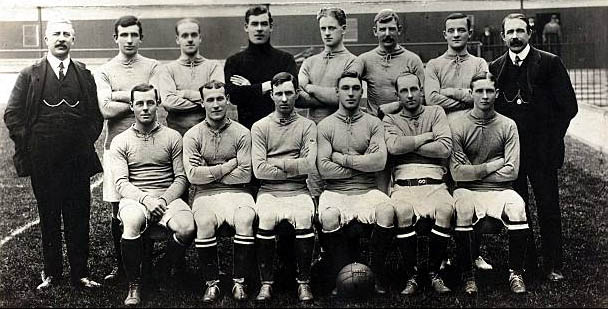
Everton also toured to Argentina and Uruguay in 1909

Everton
Date	Rival	Score	Venue
06 Jun 1909	(England) Tottenham Hotspur	2–2	Sociedad Sportiva
10 Jun 1909	(Argentina) Alumni	4–0	Sociedad Sportiva
13 Jun 1909	(Uruguay) Liga Uruguaya	2–1	Parque Central
19 Jun 1909	(England) Tottenham Hotspur	4–0	Sociedad Sportiva
20 Jun 1909	Liga Argentina	4–1	Sociedad Sportiva

Balance
Pl	W	D	L	Gs	Gc
5	4	1	0	16	4

=== Tottenham Hotspur ===
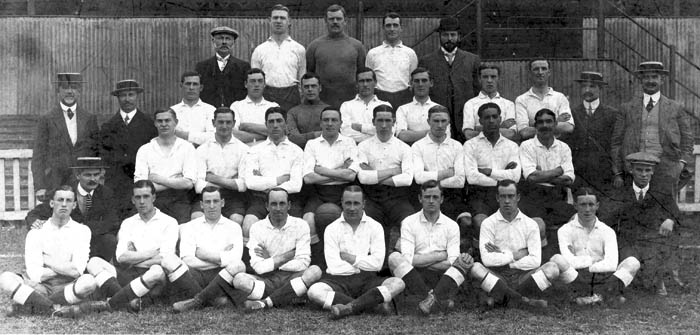
Tottenham Hotspur team of 1909

Tottenham Hotspur
Date	Rival	Score	Venue
06 Jun 1909	(England) Everton	2–2	Sociedad Sportiva
10 Jun 1909	(Uruguay) Liga Uruguaya	8–0	Parque Central
13 Jun 1909	Argentina	1–0	Sociedad Sportiva
16 Jun 1909	Liga Argentina	4–1	Sociedad Sportiva
19 Jun 1909	(England) Everton	0–4	Sociedad Sportiva
20 Jun 1909	(Argentina) Liga Rosarina	9–0	Club Argentino (R)
24 Jun 1909	(Argentina) Alumni	5–0	Sociedad Sportiva

Balance
Pl	W	D	L	Gs	Gc
7	5	1	1	29	7

=== Corinthian (1910) ===
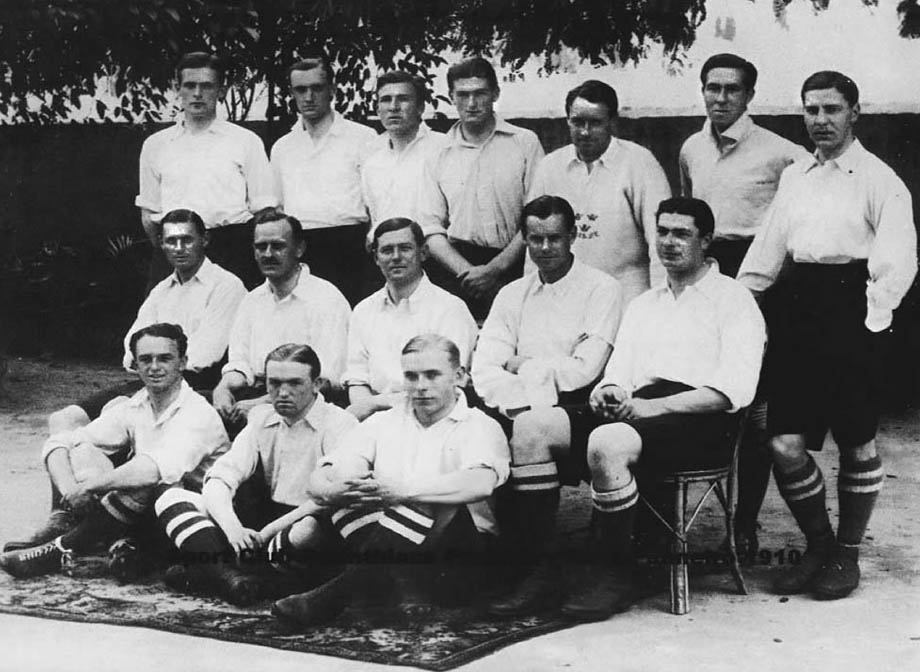
The Corinthian F.C. squad that toured on Brazil in 1910, winning all matches

Corinthian
Date	Rival	Score	Venue
24 Ago 1910	(Brazil) Fluminense	10–1	das Laranjeiras
26 Ago 1910	(Brazil) Rio de Janeiro	8–1	das Laranjeiras
28 Ago 1910	(Brazil) Rio de Janeiro	5–2	das Laranjeiras
31 Ago 1910	(Brazil) A.A. das Palmeiras (Note: "Associação Atlética das Palmeiras" (not to be confused with S.E. Palmeiras, established in 1914), was a football club that merged with members of C.A. Paulistano to form São Paulo FC in 1930)	2–0	Velódromo
2 Sep 1910	(Brazil) São Paulo	5–0	Velódromo
4 Sep 1910	(Brazil) Foreigners São Paulo	8–2	Velódromo

Balance
Pl	W	D	L	Gs	Gc
6	6	0	0	38	6

=== Swindon Town ===
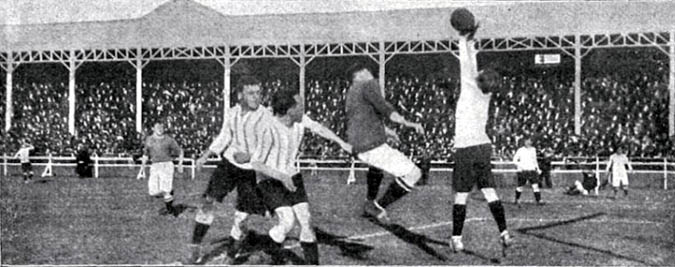
Swindon Town playing Argentina national team at GEBA stadium, July 1912

Swindon Town
Date	Rival	Score	Venue
16 Jun 1912	(Argentina) Combinado Norte	2–2	GEBA
22 Jun 1912	(Argentina) San Isidro	4–1	GEBA
23 Jun 1912	(Argentina) Combinado Sur	2–0	GEBA
29 Jun 1912	(Argentina) Liga Rosarina	3–1	Club Argentino (R)
30 Jun 1912	Liga Argentina	2–2	GEBA
4 Jul 1912	(Argentina) Estudiantes (BA)	4–0	GEBA
7 Jul 1912	(Uruguay) Liga Uruguaya	3–0	Parque Central
9 Jul 1912	Argentina	1–0	GEBA

Balance
Pl	W	D	L	Gs	Gc
8	6	2	0	21	6

=== Corinthian (1913) ===
Corinthian
Date	Rival	Score	Venue
21 Aug 1913	(Brazil) Rio de Janeiro	1–2	das Laranjeiras
23 Aug 1913	(Brazil) Foreigners Rio	4–0	das Laranjeiras
24 Aug 1913	(Brazil) Rio de Janeiro	2–1	das Laranjeiras
28 Aug 1913	(Brazil) Paulistano	2–1	Velódromo
30 Aug 1913	(Brazil) Mackenzie College	8–2	Velódromo
31 Aug 1913	(Brazil) A.A. das Palmeiras	1–1	Velódromo

Balance
Pl	W	D	L	Gs	Gc
6	4	1	1	18	7

=== Exeter City ===
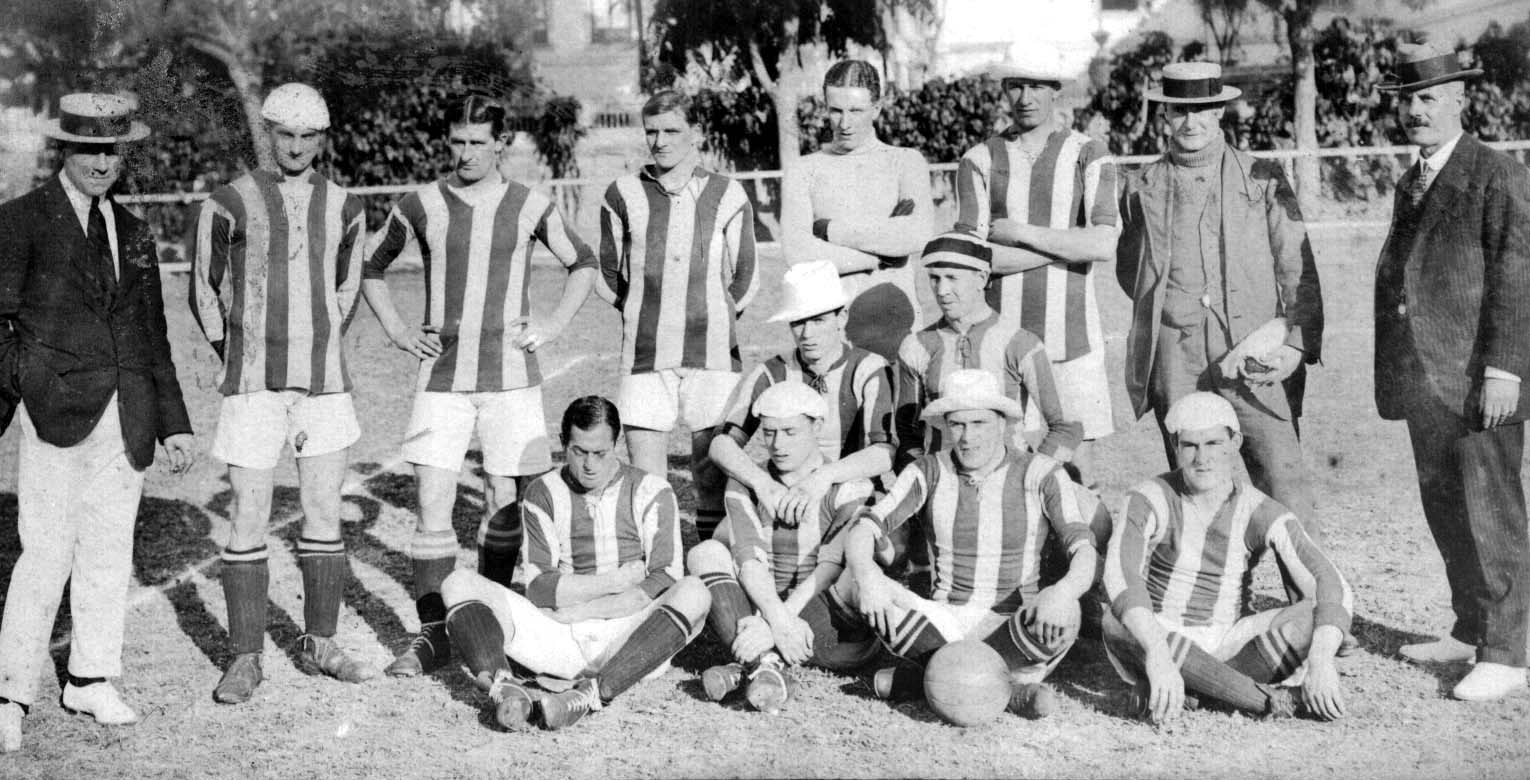
The 1914 Exeter City team that toured on South America

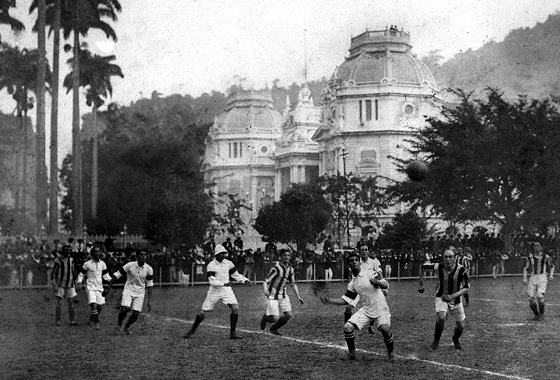
The first Brazil national team ever playing Exeter City in Rio de Janeiro

Exeter City
Date	Rival	Score	Venue
14 Jun 1914	(Argentina) Combinado Norte	0–1	Racing
21 Jun 1914	(Argentina) Combinado Sur	3–0	Racing
24 Jun 1914	(Argentina) Racing	2–0	Racing
28 Jun 1914	(Argentina) Liga Rosarina	3–1	Club Argentino (R)
29 Jun 1914	(Argentina) Combined team	5–0	Racing
9 Jul 1914	Liga Argentina	3–0	Racing
11 Jul 1914	Argentina	0–0	Ferro C. Oeste
12 Jul 1914	Liga Argentina	3–1	Racing
18 Jul 1914	(Brazil) English of Rio	3–0	das Laranjeiras
19 Jul 1914	(Brazil) Rio de Janeiro	5–3	das Laranjeiras
21 Jul 1914	Brazil	0–2	das Laranjeiras

Balance
Pl	W	D	L	Gs	Gc
11	8	1	2	27	8

=== Third Lanark ===
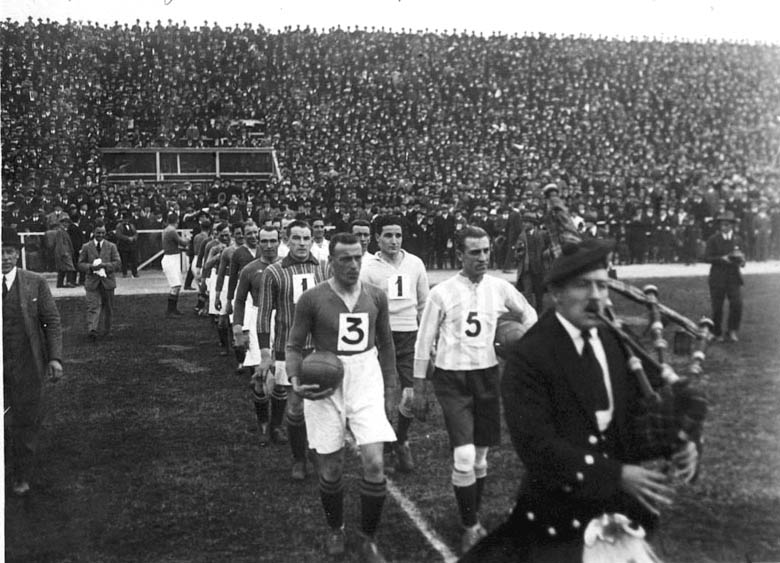
Third Lanark (dark jerseys) and Capital Zona Norte combined entering to the pitch, 10 June 1923

Third Lanark
Date	Rival	Score	Venue
10 June 1923	(Argentina) Capital (Norte)	0–1	River Plate
17 June 1923	(Argentina) Capital (Sud)	3–1	River Plate
19 June 1923	Uruguay	1–1	Pocitos
24 June 1923	Argentina (AAmF)	1–1	River Plate
29 June 1923	(Argentina) Independiente	1–2	River Plate
1 Jul 1923	(Argentina) Combinado Provincias	3–2	River Plate
4 Jul 1923	(Uruguay) Peñarol	2–0	Pocitos
8 Jul 1923	Comb. Argentina / Uruguay	2–1	River Plate

Balance
Pl	W	D	L	Gs	Gc
8	4	2	2	13	9

=== Plymouth Argyle ===
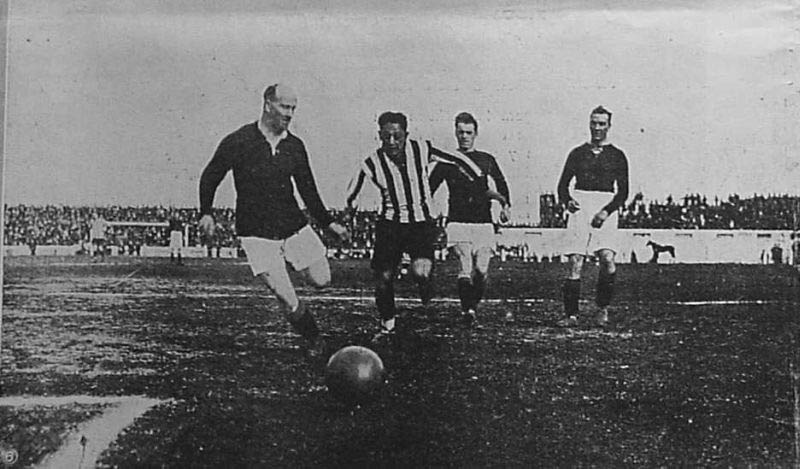
Plymouth Argyle v. Argentina national team (first match): Welsh back Moses Russell (left) fights to cut off centre-forward Gabino Sosa

Plymouth Argyle
Date	Rival	Score	Venue
22 Jun 1924	Argentina	1–0	Sportivo Barracas
29 Jun 1924	Argentina	0–3	Sportivo Barracas
4 Jul 1924	Uruguay	4–0	Parque Central
6 Jul 1924	(Argentina) Rosario Combined	0–0	Newell's
8 Jul 1924	(Argentina) Rosario Combined	1–2	Boca Juniors
9 Jul 1924	(Argentina) Boca Juniors	0–0	Boca Juniors
13 Jul 1924	Argentina	1–0	Boca Juniors
18 Jul 1924	Uruguay	1–1	Parque Central
20 Jul 1924	Argentina	0–1	Sportivo Barracas

Balance
Pl	W	D	L	Gs	Gc
9	3	3	3	8	7

=== Motherwell ===
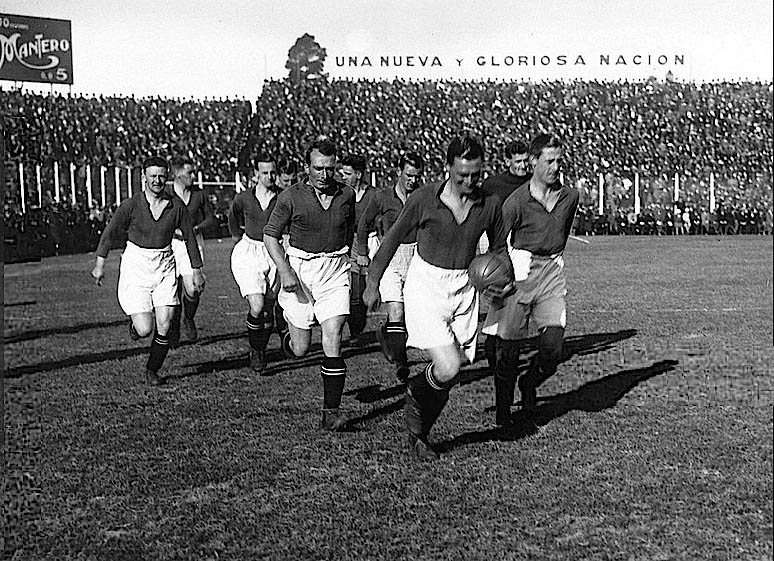
Motherwell F.C. players entering to River Plate field to play the first match of the tour, May 1928

Motherwell
Date	Rival	Score	Venue
13 May 1928	(Argentina) Combinado Capital (Note: Players of teams from Buenos Aires city.)	0–1	River Plate
17 May 1928	(Argentina) Combinado Provincia (Note: Players of teams from Greater Buenos Aires.)	1–2	River Plate
20 May 1928	Argentina	2–3	Sp. Barracas
25 May 1928	(Argentina) Liga Rosarina	4–3	Independiente
27 May 1928	Argentina (AAmF) (Note: As the main Argentine players were at Amsterdam playing the Summer Olympics tournament, the team was composed of players from the Asociación Amateurs de Football, a dissident league that organised its own championship from 1919 to 1926.)	3–0	Boca Juniors (Note: Located in Brandsen and Del Crucero, it stood (1924–38) before La Bombonera was built on the same place.)
3 Jun 1928	Comb. Argentina / Uruguay	3–0	River Plate
5 Jun 1928	(Argentina) Combinado del Interior	4–1	Racing
7 Jun 1928	(Argentina) Liga Rosarina	3–2	Newell's O.B.
9 Jun 1928	(Argentina) Boca Juniors	0–2	Boca Juniors
10 Jun 1928	(Uruguay) Peñarol	1–0	Parque Central
14 Jun 1928	(Uruguay) Peñarol	1–2	Pocitos
21 Jun 1928	(Brazil) Rio de Janeiro	1–1	das Laranjeiras
24 Jun 1928	Brazil	0–5	das Laranjeiras

Balance
Pl	W	D	L	Gs	Gc
13	7	0	6	23	21

=== Chelsea ===
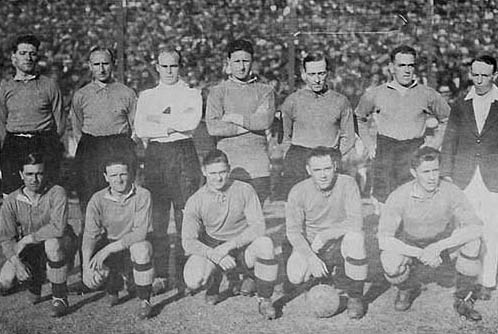
The Chelsea F.C. team that toured on South America, photographed in Argentina in 1929

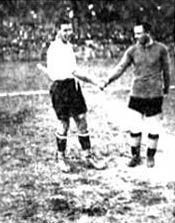
Chelsea v. Corinthians, in São Paulo. Both captains greet before the match

Chelsea
Date	Rival	Score	Venue
25 May 1929	(Argentina) Combinado Capital	3–2	San Lorenzo
26 May 1929	(Argentina) Combinado Provincia	0–4	Racing
31 May 1929	Argentina	1–0	River Plate
2 Jun 1929	(Argentina) Combinado Capital	2–3	Boca Juniors
8 Jun 1929	(Argentina) San Lorenzo	2–0	? (Buenos Aires)
9 Jun 1929	(Uruguay) Peñarol	1–2	Pocitos
15 Jun 1929	(Argentina) Independiente	1–1	? (Avellaneda)
16 Jun 1929	(Argentina) Liga Rosarina	1–2	Newell's O.B.
16 Jun 1929	(Argentina) Unión	0–5	15 de Abril
20 Jun 1929	(Argentina) Racing	0–1	Racing
22 Jun 1929	(Argentina) Estudiantil Porteño	3–2	River Plate
23 Jun 1929	(Uruguay) Wanderers	1–0	Parque Central
28 Jun 1929	(Brazil) Rio de Janeiro	1–1	das Laranjeiras
30 Jun 1929	(Brazil) Rio de Janeiro	1–2	das Laranjeiras
4 Jul 1929	(Brazil) Corinthians	4–4	Parque Antarctica
7 Jul 1929	(Brazil) São Paulo	1–3	Parque Antarctica

Balance
Pl	W	D	L	Gs	Gc
16	5	3	8	23	32
