= Walter Bull =

English footballer (1874–1952)

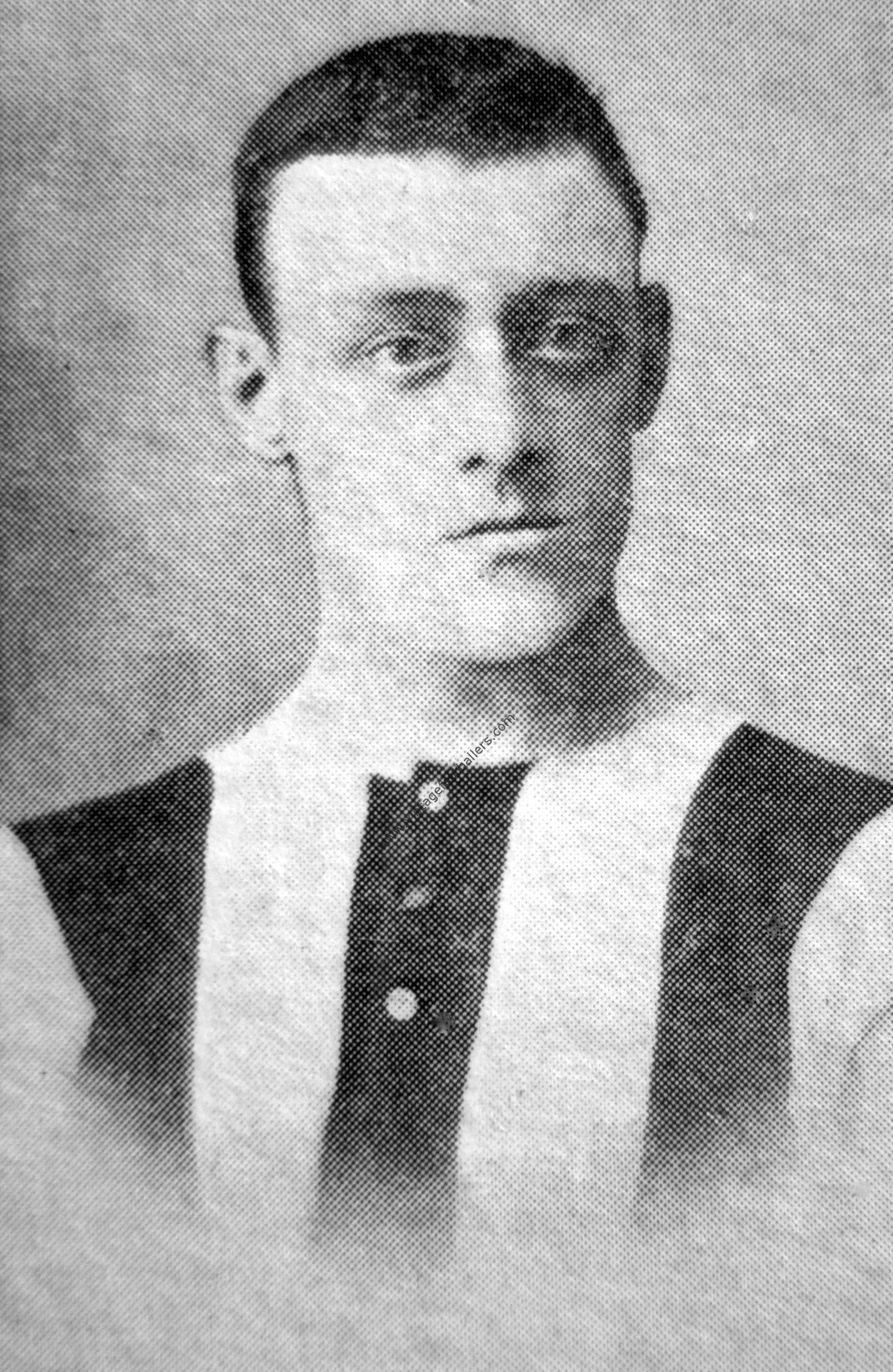
- Bull on a cigarette card by Wills, 1902

Personal information
- Date of birth: 19 December 1871
- Place of birth: Nottingham, England
- Date of death: 21 July 1952 (aged 80)
- Place of death: Nottingham, England
- Position: Half back

Youth career
- St Andrews Church

Senior career*
Years	Team	Apps	(Gls)
1894–1904	Notts County		
1904–1909	Tottenham Hotspur	117	(8)
1910–1911	Heanor United		

Managerial career
- 1911: Gimnasia y Esgrima (BA)
- 1912: Northampton Town
- * Club domestic league appearances and goals

Walter Bull (19 December 1871 – 21 July 1952) was an English football player and manager. He was the first coach of a football team in Argentina.

He was born and died in Nottingham.

A half back, Bull played for Notts County and Tottenham Hotspur in the late 1890s and 1900s. At international level, Bull played for the Football League representative against the Scottish League side at Ibrox Park, Glasgow, on 19 March 1901. He had previously scored for the North in an international trial match against the South at the old Crystal Palace on 25 February 1901. He then featured for the South v North at Ashton Gate, Bristol on 13 February 1905 and again on 22 January 1906. He also played for Professionals of the South v Amateurs of the South on 8 January 1906. During 1905–06 he was first reserve for the full England team as understudy to Colin Veitch, the regular centre half.

He represented the Spurs on the Professional Footballers Association committee when the organisation was formed in 1907.

At Tottenham, he counted amongst his teammates Herbert Chapman; in 1907 Bull was offered the job of Northampton Town manager but after accepting changed his mind, and recommended Chapman take charge of the club instead, launching his career in management.

Bull had the privilege to be the first coach ever of a football team in Argentina when he was hired by club Gimnasia y Esgrima de Buenos Aires in 1911. Bull's duties included taking over the youth divisions of the club. It was the second coming of Bull to Argentina since he had been part of the Tottenham Hotspur team that toured South America in 1909.

Local newspaper La Nación wrote about the arrival of Bull to Gimnasia y Esgrima:

Player L. Bull of Spurs arrived (to Argentina) last Saturday. He will be the trainer (Note: Literal word used in the article, from the original in Spanish) of Club Gimnasia y Esgrima. Yesterday he watched the match played in el Caballito, with the purpose of indicating the appropriate modifications in the game.

— La Nación, 25 April 1911

After his brief tenure on Argentine football, Bull would eventually become Chapman's successor at Northampton Town, taking over in 1912 but managing the club for just a single season (1912-13).
