= 1929 Argentine Primera División =

38th season of top-tier football league in Argentina

Primera División
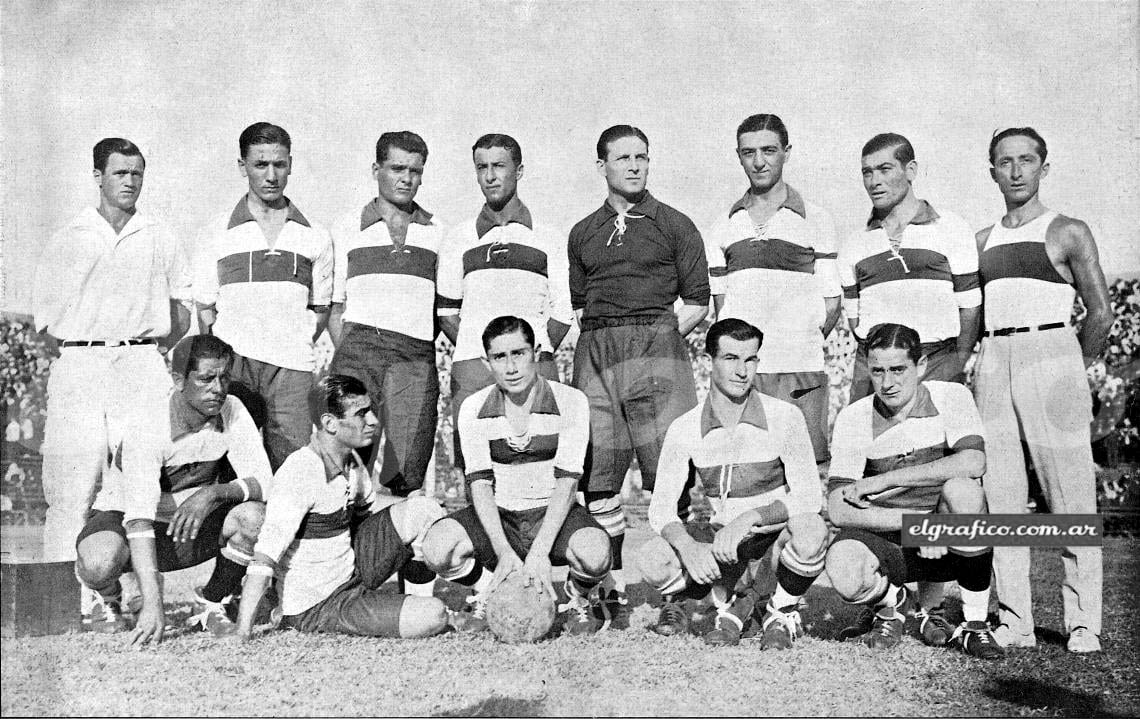
- Gimnasia y Esgrima LP, champions
- Season: 1929
- Dates: 21 July 1929 – 9 February 1930
- Champions: Gimnasia y Esgrima (LP) (1st title)
- Promoted: Colegiales
- Relegated: (none)
- Top goalscorer: (Argentina) José Cortecce (Argentina) Manuel Seoane (13 goals each)

The 1929 Argentine Primera División was the 38th season of top-flight football in Argentina. The season began on July 21, 1929, and ended on February 9, 1930. This season saw the 35 teams of Primera, divided into two groups. The top 2 of each group qualified for the final stages of the tournament, which was eventually won by Gimnasia y Esgrima (LP).

The season was marred by mass abandonment of games, defending Argentine champion Huracán withdrew from 8 of its fixtures leaving them to finish in 14th place in the group. Several other teams withdrew from multiple games. Abandonments of games, discontinuations, and withdrawals were quite common in these early seasons (cf., for instance, the second half of the 1930 season).

Colegiales returned to the first division after winning the Primera B championship last year.

== Group A ==
Pos	Team	Pld	W	D	L	GF	GA	GD	Pts	Qualification
1	Gimnasia y Esgrima (LP)	17	14	0	3	33	11	+22	28	Finalist
2	River Plate	17	12	3	2	28	11	+17	27	Third place match
3	Lanús	17	8	8	1	31	17	+14	24	
4	Racing	17	10	4	3	24	17	+7	24	
5	Almagro	17	8	5	4	19	18	+1	21	
6	Talleres (RE)	17	7	5	5	16	13	+3	19	
7	San Fernando	17	6	5	6	31	20	+11	17	
8	Colegiales	17	5	7	5	28	28	0	17	
9	El Porvenir	17	7	3	7	19	26	−7	17	
10	Estudiantes (LP)	17	7	2	8	32	20	+12	16	
11	Tigre	17	5	5	7	28	23	+5	15	
12	Argentino del Sud	17	6	3	8	14	24	−10	15	
13	Banfield	17	5	4	8	18	23	−5	14	
14	Huracán	17	6	1	10	26	11	+15	13	
15	Atlanta	17	4	3	10	10	24	−14	11	
16	San Isidro	17	3	3	11	14	36	−22	9	
17	Estudiantes (BA)	17	2	4	11	8	41	−33	8	
18	Platense	17	3	1	13	7	23	−16	7	

== Group B ==
Pos	Team	Pld	W	D	L	GF	GA	GD	Pts	Qualification
1	Boca Juniors	16	13	1	2	31	11	+20	27	2nd. finalist playoff
2	San Lorenzo	16	12	3	1	42	15	+27	27	2nd. finalist playoff
3	Independiente	16	7	6	3	38	18	+20	20	
4	Estudiantil Porteño	16	8	4	4	26	21	+5	20	
5	Chacarita Juniors	16	8	4	4	23	20	+3	20	
6	Vélez Sarsfield	16	9	2	5	23	21	+2	20	
7	Argentinos Juniors	16	5	5	6	16	22	−6	15	
8	Barracas Central	16	7	1	8	16	30	−14	15	
9	Sportivo Palermo	16	6	2	8	14	21	−7	14	
10	Quilmes	16	6	2	8	8	26	−18	14	
11	Defensores de Belgrano	16	4	4	8	12	18	−6	12	
12	Sportivo Buenos Aires	16	4	4	8	20	19	+1	12	
13	Excursionistas	16	5	2	9	20	33	−13	12	
14	Argentino (Q)	16	4	3	9	16	17	−1	11	
15	Argentino (B)	16	3	5	8	21	28	−7	11	
16	Ferro Carril Oeste	16	2	6	8	23	25	−2	10	
17	Sportivo Barracas	16	3	4	9	13	17	−4	10	

=== 2nd. Finalist Playoff ===
As Boca Juniors and San Lorenzo finished equaled on points, they needed a playoff to decide which team went to the final and which to the 3rd/4th place playoff.

Series	Team 1	Res.	Team 2	Venue	City
Playoff	Boca Juniors	2–2	San Lorenzo	Estadio River Plate	Buenos Aires

Series	Team 1	Res.	Team 2	Venue	City
Playoff 2	Boca Juniors	2–2	San Lorenzo	Estadio Racing Club	Avellaneda

Series	Team 1	Res.	Team 2	Venue	City
Playoff 3	Boca Juniors	3–1	San Lorenzo	Estadio River Plate	Buenos Aires

==== Match details ====
19 January 1930

Boca Juniors	2–2	San Lorenzo
Kuko; Evaristo	Report	D. García; Arrieta

River Plate, Buenos Aires

26 January 1930

Boca Juniors	2–2	San Lorenzo
Evaristo; Muttis	Report	D. García; Foresto

Racing Club, Avellaneda

2 February 1930

Boca Juniors	3–1	San Lorenzo
Evaristo (2); Moreyras	Report 1 Report 2	Carricaberry

River Plate, Buenos Aires

=== Third place ===
Series	Team 1	Res.	Team 2	Venue	City
Third place	River Plate	– (Note: San Lorenzo did not attend the match so the points were given to River Plate.)	San Lorenzo	Estadio Racing Club	Avellaneda

=== Match details ===
9 February 1930

River Plate	wp/lp	San Lorenzo
	Report

Racing Club, Avellaneda

== Championship final ==
Series	Team 1	Res.	Team 2	Venue	City
Playoff	Gimnasia y Esgrima (LP)	2–1	Boca Juniors	Estadio River Plate	Buenos Aires
