= Tomás Brown =

Argentine footballer

Personal information
- Place of birth: Argentina

Senior career*
Years	Team	Apps	(Gls)
- Alumni Athletic Club
- * Club domestic league appearances and goals

Tomás Brown was an Argentine footballer who played for the Alumni Athletic Club. Brown was an Argentine of Scottish origin. Brown had five brothers who were Argentine international players – Alfredo, Carlos, Eliseo, Ernesto and Jorge – as well as one cousin, Juan Domingo. Another brother – Diego – also played for Alumni Athletic Club.
