= Carlos Brown (footballer) =

Argentine footballer (1882–1926)

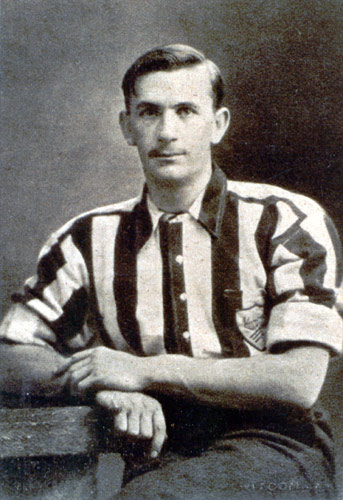

Personal information
- Full name: Carlos Carr Brown
- Date of birth: 25 February 1882
- Place of birth: Argentina
- Date of death: 12 August 1926 (aged 44)
- Position: Defender

Senior career*
Years	Team	Apps	(Gls)
- Alumni

International career
1903–1905	Argentina	2	(0)
- * Club domestic league appearances and goals

Carlos Carr Brown (25 February 1882 – 12 August 1926) was an Argentine international footballer who played as a defender.

== Early life ==
Brown was an Argentine of Scottish origin.

Brown had four brothers who were also Argentine international players – Alfredo, Eliseo, Ernesto and Jorge – as well as one cousin, Juan Domingo. Two other brothers – Diego and Tomás – were also footballers.

== Career ==
Brown played club football for Alumni Athletic Club, and international football for the Argentina national team between 1903 and 1905 making 2 official appearances.

== See also ==
- Brown family (Argentina)
