= Estadio Alvear y Tagle =

Former stadium in Buenos Aires, Argentina

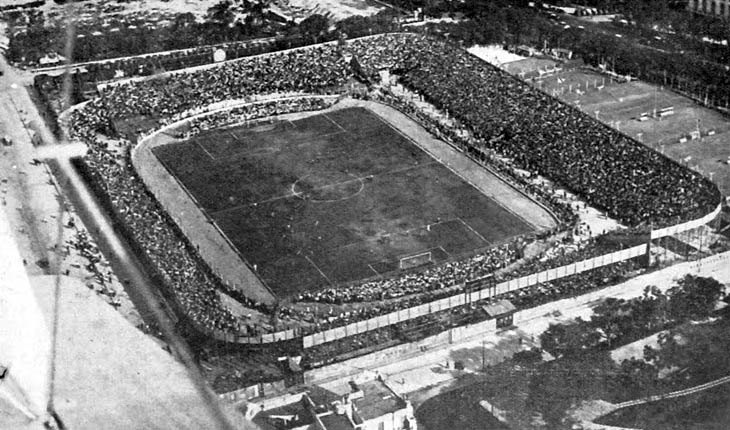
- Aerial view of the stadium, c. 1932
- Interactive map of Estadio Alvear y Tagle
- Address: Alvear Avenue and Tagle, Buenos Aires
- Coordinates: 34.582°S 58.397°W
- Owner: BA Pacific Railway
- Operator: C.A. River Plate
- Capacity: 50,000
- Surface: Grass

Construction
- Opened: 20 May 1923
- Closed: 1937
- Demolished: 1938; 88 years ago
- Architect: Bernardo Messina

Tenants
- River Plate (1923–37); Argentina national football team (1924–37)

The Estadio Alvear y Tagle was a stadium in Buenos Aires, Argentina. The venue had a capacity for 40,000 spectators and was located on Alvear (now Del Libertador Avenue and Tagle street), in the Recoleta district. Opened in 1923, it was rented and operated by Club Atlético River Plate, being used as its home venue until the club inaugurated the Estadio Monumental in 1938.

== History ==
In 1922, Club Atlético River Plate signed a contract with British company Buenos Aires and Pacific Railway to rent a land in Recoleta district. The contract was for a period of 5 years, for m$n 500 per month. The purpose was to build a stadium to host River Plate home football matches.

The stadium was built and inaugurated in 1923 to serve as home venue for Club Atlético River Plate football team. The official grandstand, built on Alvear avenue, had 120 meters long. Under the grandstands, there were first aid room, hair saloon, sports clothing for club's members and a party hall.

In May 1923, the stadium was officially inaugurated in occasion of a friendly match between local host River Plate and Uruguayan club Peñarol. In June 1923, Scottish club Third Lanark played at River Plate stadium six games of their tour on South America. Then President of Argentina, Marcelo T. de Alvear, attended the Third Lanark v. Asociación Amateurs combined match on June 24, 1923.

The first official match played by River Plate in that stadium was on July 22, 1923, v. Vélez Sársfield. River Plate won by 2–1. The venue also hosted the Campeonato Argentino final stage. It was a competition played by Argentine provincial sides. In December 1923, boxer Luis Ángel Firpo made an exhibition fight v. Joe Boykin.

In August 1924 and May 1925, the Asociación Amateurs combined played Federación Uruguaya de Football. Both teams were representatives of dissident associations of both countries. The stadium would be refurbished later, extending its capacity to near 50,000 spectators.

The stadium was the venue for several football matches during the tours made by European teams at the end of the 1920s. Some of them were Spanish clubs Real Madrid (which played their first game v. the Argentina national team) and Barcelona Scottish Motherwell F.C. (one of several British clubs that toured on South America), Hungarian Ferencváros and Italian Torino.

River Plate was also one of two stadiums that hosted the 1929 Copa América. The 1929 Primera División playoff match between Boca Juniors and Gimnasia y Esgrima de La Plata was also played in River Plate. In 1930, Yugoslavia became the first European national side that played at the venue, facing the Argentine side on August 3.

The club expanded their facilities around the stadium. Other sports include tennis, basketball and volleyball courts and a swimming pool. In 1936 the club installed a lighting system in the stadium, supported on six metallic towers. Nevertheless, the increase of popularity of football in Argentina forced River Plate to build a new stadium with higher capacity. The last game played there was on December 5, 1937, v. San Lorenzo de Almagro. The following year the stadium would be dismantled and the land became a public park. Part of the grandstand structures (made in wood) were sold to Club Almagro and placed in the stadium the club owned on Fraga and Estomba streets.

Preceded by Estadio Nacional; Lima	Campeonato Sudamericano; Venue; 1929	Succeeded by Estadio Nacional; Lima
Preceded by Estadio Nacional; Lima	Campeonato Sudamericano; Venue; 1937	Succeeded by Estadio Nacional; Lima
