= John Hamilton (footballer, born 1880) =

Scottish footballer

Personal information
- Date of birth: 1880
- Place of birth: Glasgow, Scotland
- Position: Winger
1904–1905	West Ham United	5	(0)

John Hamilton (1880 – after 1904) was a Scottish footballer who played as a winger for West Ham United.

== Footballing career ==
Born in Glasgow, Hamilton made his West Ham debut in December 1904 against Portsmouth. He made five appearances without scoring.
