= Juan Domingo Brown =

Argentine footballer (1888–1931)

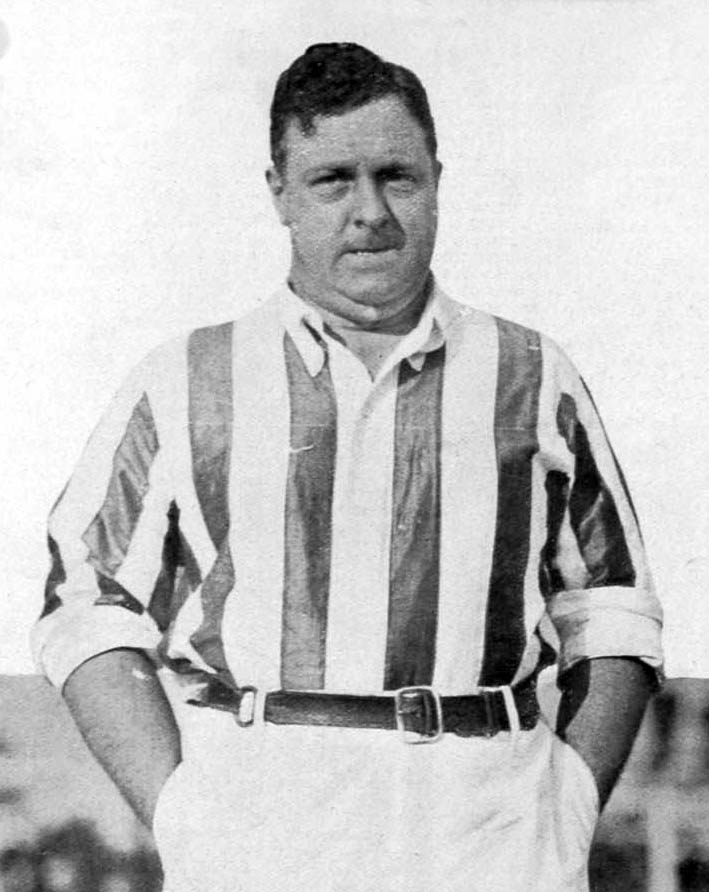
- Brown during an Alumni veterans match in July 1923

Personal information
- Full name: Juan Domingo Brown
- Date of birth: 21 June 1888
- Place of birth: Argentina
- Date of death: 16 September 1931 (aged 43)
- Position: Defender

Senior career*
Years	Team	Apps	(Gls)
1905–1911	Alumni		
1915–1916	Quilmes		

International career
1906–1916	Argentina	38	(2)
Medal record
Men's football
Representing Argentina
South American Championship
Runner-up	1916 Argentina
- * Club domestic league appearances and goals

Juan Domingo Brown (20 June 1888 – 16 September 1931) was an Argentine international footballer.

== Biography ==
Brown was born on 20 June 1888. He was a Scottish Argentine. He had five cousins who were also Argentine international players – Alfredo, Carlos, Eliseo, Ernesto and Jorge. Two other cousins – Diego and Tomás – were also footballers.

Brown played club football for Alumni and Quilmes. He made 38 appearances for the Argentina national team between 1906 and 1916, scoring two goals. He was captain of the Argentinian national team on 12 occasions.
