= Héctor Henman =

English-born South African-Argentine footballer

Personal information
- Full name: Harold James Henman
- Date of birth: 5 January 1879
- Place of birth: Oxford, England
- Date of death: 26 May 1969 (aged 90)
- Place of death: Los Cocos, Argentina
- Position: Inside forward

Senior career*
Years	Team	Apps	(Gls)
1906	Alumni Athletic Club		

International career
1904	South Africa	1	(0)
1906–1907	Argentina	1	(0)
- * Club domestic league appearances and goals

Harold James "Héctor" Henman (5 January 1879 – 26 May 1969) was a footballer who played as an inside left for South Africa and Argentina.

== Early life ==
Henman was born in Oxford, England, on 5 January 1879, and educated at Bedford School from 1893 to 1897. At an early age he moved to South Africa.

He received the temporary rank of lieutenant in the Army on 16 January 1902, upon joining the 34th Battalion, Imperial Yeomanry, during the later stages of the Second Boer War in South Africa.

== Playing career ==
=== Club ===
In Argentina Henman played for Alumni Athletic Club.

=== International ===
Henman played one match for an unofficial South African XI in 1904.

In 1906 Henman was selected to play for a South Africa national team that toured South America. Upon arriving in Argentina Henman decided to stay and played one match for the Argentina national team.

== Later life ==
Henman died suddenly at his home in Los Cocos, Córdoba Province, Argentina, on 26 May 1969.
