= Eliseo Brown =

Argentine footballer (1888–?)

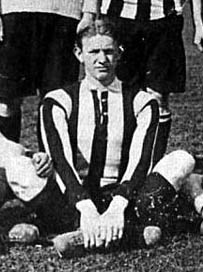

Personal information
- Date of birth: 29 October 1888
- Place of birth: Argentina
- Position: Forward

Senior career*
Years	Team	Apps	(Gls)
- Alumni

International career
1906–1911	Argentina	10	(6)
- * Club domestic league appearances and goals

Eliseo Brown (29 October 1888 – unknown) was an Argentine international footballer who played as a forward.

== Early life ==
Brown was an Argentine of Scottish origin.

Brown had four brothers who were also Argentine international players – Alfredo, Carlos, Ernesto and Jorge – as well as one cousin, Juan Domingo. Two other brothers – Diego and Tomás – were also footballers.

== Career ==
Brown played club football for Alumni, and international football for the Argentina national team. Brown was top-scorer in the Primera División in the 1906, 1907, 1908 and 1909 seasons.

Brown played for the Argentina national team between 1906 and 1911, scoring 6 goals in 10 official appearances.
