= Historia del Fútbol Amateur en la Argentina =

- 1st edition paperback cover
- Author: Jorge Iwanczuk
- Language: Spanish
- Genre: Non-fiction
- Publisher: Centro para la Investigación de la Historia del Fútbol [es] (1st edition); Self-published (2nd edition)
- Publication date: 4 December 1992
- Publication place: Buenos Aires
- Pages: 398
- ISBN: 950-43-4384-8

Historia del Fútbol Amateur en la Argentina (transl. History of Amateur Football in Argentina) is a 1992 non-fiction book written by Jorge Iwanzcuk that relates the history of Argentine association football during the Amateur era, that spanned between 1891 and 1934. Published by the Centro para la Investigación de la Historia del Fútbol [es] (Center for Research into the History of Football, CIHF), the paperback has received positive reception among critics as an essential book for the history of Argentine football.

Iwanzcuk reprinted the book was reprinted in a 2022 in an expanded and self-published edition, where he managed to minimize the number of missing results to 16. Since then, it has been minimized to 9.

== Development and contents ==
Jorge Iwanzcuk, author of the book, initially set out to research and write a new book about his favourite team; however, as he reached the year of 1925, he reached a dead end due to the early years confusing nature. Before the release of Historia del Fútbol Amateur en la Argentina, no one had written about the full history of Argentine football's Amateur era; Iwanzcuk took note of this and began to work on the book. He compiled statistics from research made with the La Nación and La Prensa newspaper archives and finished the book in 1992 following a period of six years of research.

The book is in chronological order to enhance the reading experience and, aside from the years of 1891 to 1934 of the Amateur era, recounts the record of the Buenos Aires Football Club along with the origins of the sport in Argentina. Years are covered with illustrations along with the statistics of their corresponding season. Moreover, in its first edition, 55 matches were missing and couldn't be added to the statistics of their alining year. Nonetheless, Iwanzcuk found 39 more results for the second revised edition.

== Release and reception ==
Historia del Fútbol Amateur en la Argentina was released on 4 December 1992 with the Centro para la Investigación de la Historia del Fútbol [es] as the publisher, organization which Iwanczuk founded. Only 3000 copies were produced which were quickly sold out. This led to the work becoming greatly sought after. 30 years later, Iwanzcuk self-published a second revised edition; however, it was only made accessible through his social media accounts and Mercado Libre. Since the publication of both editions, historians have minimized the number of missing results to 9 thanks to the deepening of research.

In an article for newspaper Tiempo Argentino [es], Andrés Burgo expressed that the book was a "sort of Old Testament of our teams and tournaments". In a 2026 article, Federico Guerra of La Nación called it an "obligatory reference" for any work about the history of Argentine football. Clarín's Oscar Bernade agrees, calling it a monumental work for the history of the Amateur era. The paperback has since been used Rec.Sport.Soccer Statistics Foundation (RSSSF) as a source for their archive of association football statistics.
