= Alfredo Brown =

Argentine footballer (1886–1958)

Personal information
- Full name: Alfredo Carrow Brown
- Date of birth: 1 December 1886
- Place of birth: Argentina
- Date of death: 30 August 1958 (aged 71)
- Position: Forward

Senior career*
Years	Team	Apps	(Gls)
- Alumni

International career
1906–1911	Argentina	9	(4)
- * Club domestic league appearances and goals

Alfredo Carrow Brown (1 December 1886 – 30 August 1958) was an Argentine international footballer who played as a forward.

== Early life ==
Brown was born on 1 December 1886. He was a Scottish Argentine.

Brown had four brothers who were also Argentine international players – Carlos, Eliseo, Ernesto and Jorge – as well as one cousin, Juan Domingo. Two other brothers – Diego and Tomás – were also footballers.

== Career ==
Brown played club football for Alumni, and international football for the Argentina national team. He was top-scorer in the Primera División in the 1904 season.
