= Ernesto Brown =

Argentine footballer (1885–1935)

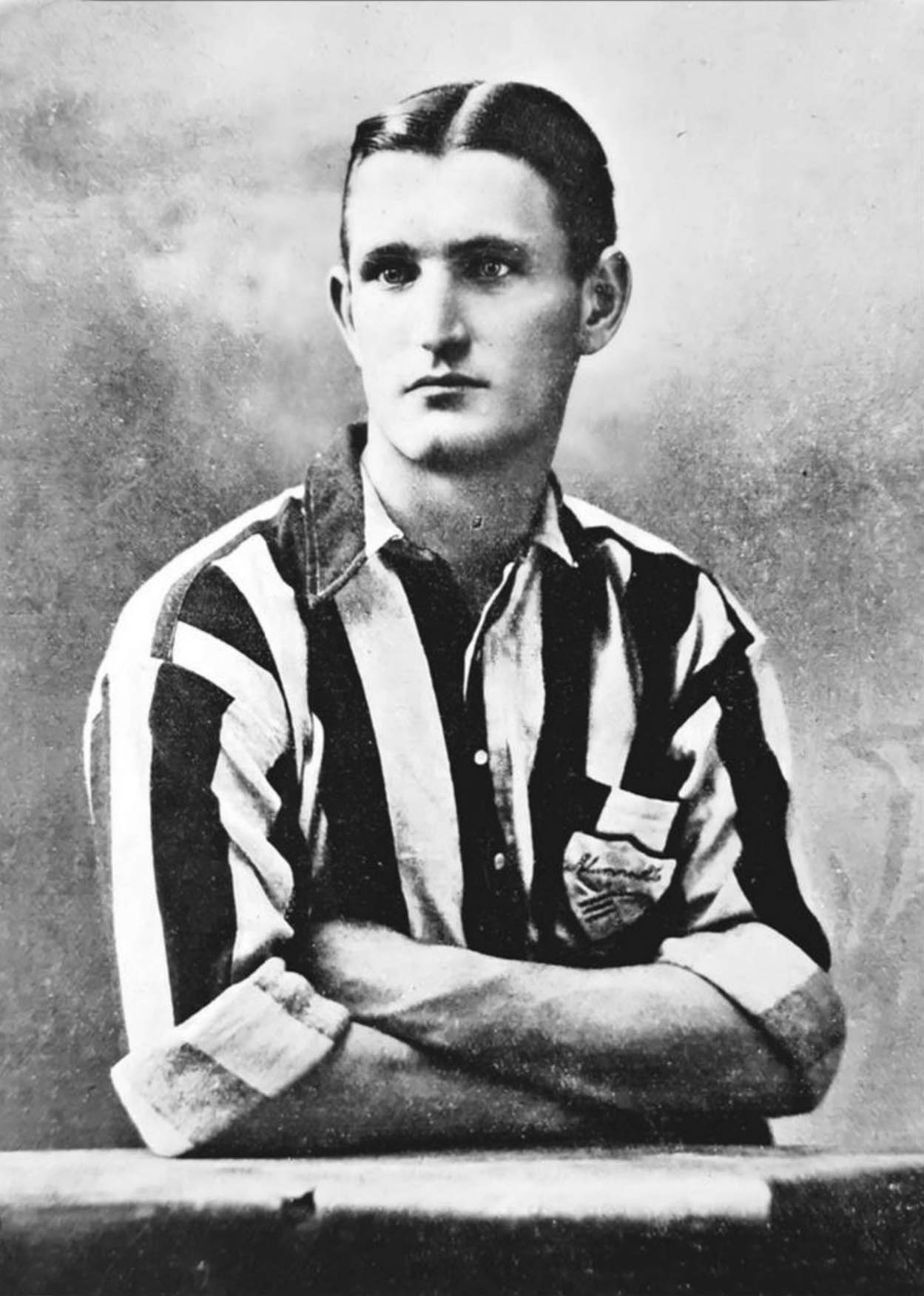
- Brown with Alumni in 1906

Personal information
- Full name: Ernesto Alejandro Brown
- Date of birth: 7 January 1885
- Place of birth: Argentina
- Date of death: 12 July 1935 (aged 50)
- Position: Left back

Senior career*
Years	Team	Apps	(Gls)
- Alumni

International career
1902–1912	Argentina	12	(1)
- * Club domestic league appearances and goals

Ernesto Alejandro Brown (7 January 1885 – 12 July 1935) was an Argentine international footballer who played as a left back. He was nicknamed El Pacifico ("the Calm One") for his assured performances for both club and country.

== Early life ==
Brown was an Argentine of Scottish origin.

Brown had four brothers who were also Argentine international players – Alfredo, Carlos, Eliseo and Jorge – as well as one cousin, Juan Domingo. Two other brothers – Diego and Tomás – were also footballers.

== Career ==
Brown played club football for Alumni, and international football for the Argentina national team. He made 12 official appearances for Argentina between 1902 and 1912, scoring one goal.
