= Jorge Brown =

Argentine footballer (1880–1936)

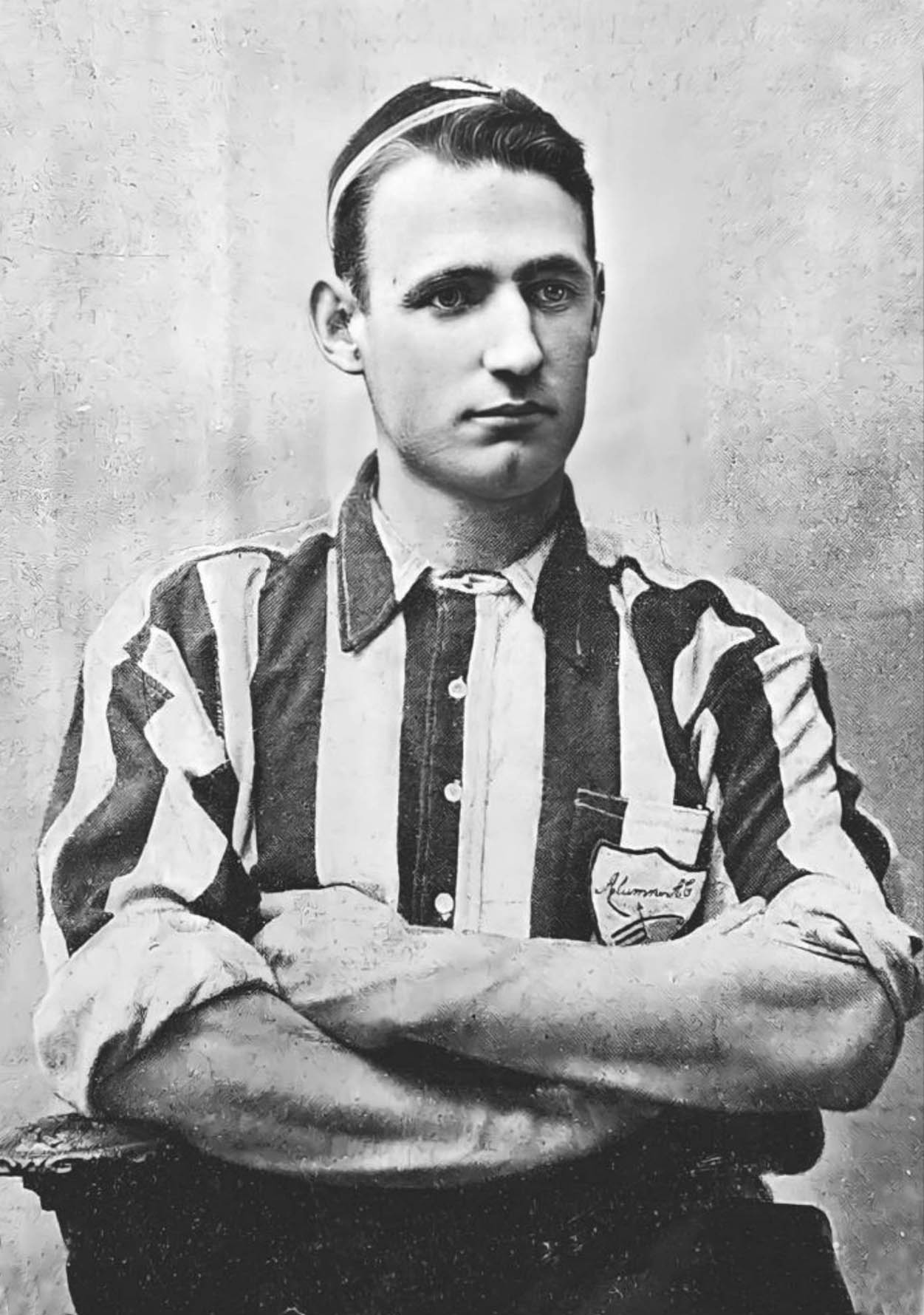
- Brown with Alumni in 1906

Personal information
- Full name: Jorge Gibson Brown
- Date of birth: 3 April 1880
- Place of birth: Altamirano, Buenos Aires, Argentina
- Date of death: 3 January 1936 (aged 55)
- Place of death: San Isidro, Buenos Aires, Argentina
- Positions: Defender; forward

Senior career*
Years	Team	Apps	(Gls)
1896	Palermo Athletic		
1897–1899	Lanús A.C.		
1900–1911	Alumni	201	(136)
1912–1914	Quilmes		

International career
1902–1913	Argentina	23	(4)
- * Club domestic league appearances and goals as of October 2008

Jorge Gibson Brown (3 April 1880 – 3 January 1936) was an Argentine footballer of Scottish ancestry, who was one of the most important figures in the early years of the sport in that country. During his career, he won a total of 21 titles playing for Alumni and Quilmes and captained the Argentina national team between 1908 and 1913.

== Biography ==
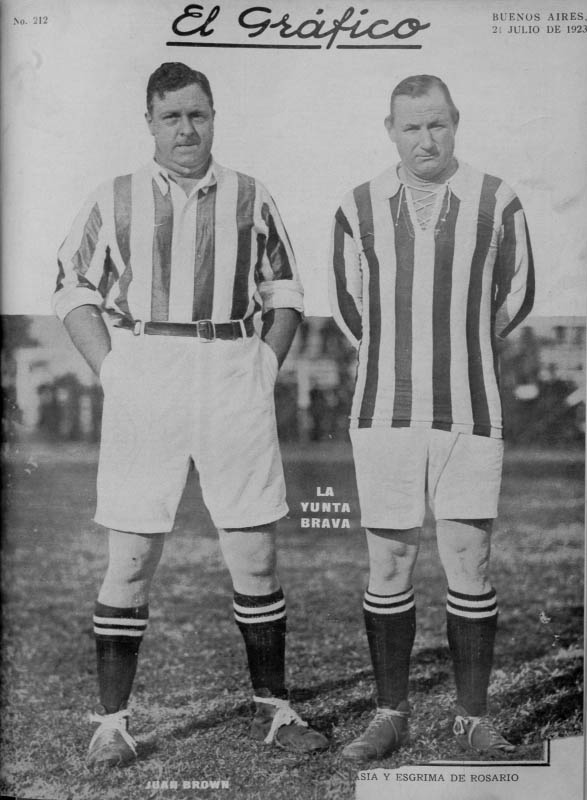
Juan Domingo Brown (right) with his cousin Juan in an exhibition game played by Alumni in 1923

Brown started playing football in the reserve team of the English High School A.C. team. In 1896 he joined Club Palermo where he played until 1897 when he moved to Lanús Athletic Club.

In 1900, Brown returned to the English High School A.C. where he was part of the team that won the 1900 league championship. In 1901, the club changed its name to "Alumni Athletic Club" and over the following decade the club dominated Argentine football, winning 9 of the 12 championships between 1900 and its dissolution in 1911.

Brown made his debut for the Argentina national team on 20 July 1902, being part of the line-up that played Uruguay in the Albion Football Club field, playing as forward and even scoring a goal. He went on to make 23 appearances, scoring four goals. Brown also captained the team for 18 matches between 1908 and 1913.

After the dissolution of Alumni, Brown joined Quilmes where he won the 1912 league championship. He played for the club until 1914.

Between 1914 and 1927, Brown played cricket competing at the "Liga de los Sábados" (Saturday League), a local competition where he captained Buenos Aires Cricket Club, an institution he would go on to serve as president. Brown played in the cricket league during 13 years.

The secret of Alumni's success was the friendship and comradeship existing among the players rather than their skills with the ball. In football, a drop of "bad blood" between two teammates would also extend to the rest of the team, and fortunately, this never happened, largely due to the Brown brother's temperament, particularly Jorge's.

— Carlos Lett, player of Alumni.

Brown had four brothers who were also Argentine international players; Alfredo, Carlos, Eliseo and Ernesto, as well as one cousin, Juan Domingo. Two other brothers, Diego and Tomás, were also footballers.

== Honours ==
Brown won a total of 21 titles during his career, 20 with Alumni and 1 with Quilmes.

Alumni:

- Primera División: 1900, 1902, 1903, 1905, 1906, 1907, 1909, 1910, 1911
- Copa de Competencia Jockey Club: 1907, 1908, 1909
- Copa de Honor Municipalidad de Buenos Aires: 1905, 1906
- Tie Cup: 1903, 1906, 1907, 1908, 1909
- Copa de Honor Cousenier: 1906

Quilmes:

- Primera División: 1912

== See also ==
- Alumni Athletic Club
