= Scottish Argentines =

Argentines of Scottish descent

Escocés-argentinos; Albannach Argentinianach
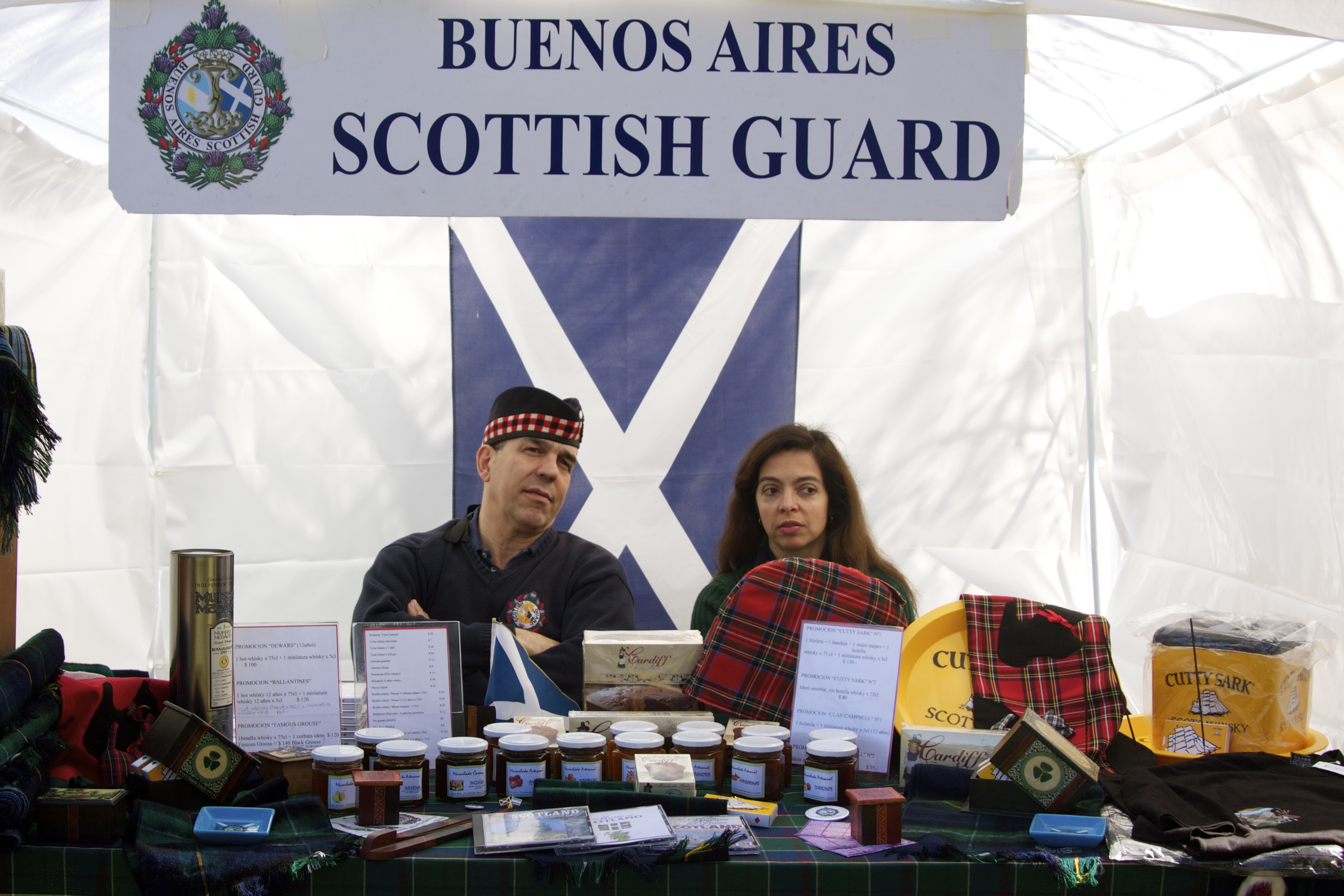
- The Buenos Aires Scottish Guard, a group of Scottish Argentines on Día del Inmigrante, a national day in Argentina.

Total population
- 200,000

Regions with significant populations
- Argentina

Languages
- Spanish. Minority speaks English, Scottish Gaelic, Lowland Scots as first language.

Religion
- Christianity; Roman Catholicism, Protestantism (Presbyterianism, Episcopalianism)

Related ethnic groups
- Scottish people, Scottish Americans, Scottish Canadians, Scottish Uruguayans

Scottish Argentines are Argentine citizens of Scottish descent or Scottish-born people who reside in Argentina. A Scottish Argentine population has existed since at least 1825. Frequently, Scottish Argentines are wrongly referred to as English. Scottish Argentines celebrate Scottish culture and hold parades for Scottish celebrations, like Burns Night.

== History ==
Percentage of people registered as British in the 1914 Argentine census. Within this group are Scottish, Irish, English and Welsh.

The first Argentine woman to earn a Doctor of Medicine degree was Cecilia Grierson, of Scottish ancestry. Two schools in Argentina have been founded by Scottish immigrants: St. Andrew's Scots School in 1838 and Balmoral College in 1959. In addition, the association football club Club Atlético Douglas Haig is named after the Scottish military commander Douglas Haig, 1st Earl Haig.

Argentine President Juan Domingo Peron had Scottish ancestry on his father's side. His great-grandmother, Ann Hughes Mc Kenzie, traced her roots to Scotland.

=== Introduction of football ===
The so-called "father of Argentine football" was a Scottish schoolteacher, Alexander Watson Hutton, who first taught football at St. Andrew's Scots School in Buenos Aires in the early 1880s. On 4 February 1884 he founded the Buenos Aires English High School [sic] where he continued to instruct the pupils in the game. In 1891 Hutton established the Association Argentine Football League, the first football league outside of the British Isles. Five clubs competed but only one season was ever played.

His son Arnold Watson Hutton (1886–1951) was an Argentine football striker for the Argentina national team. He also played cricket, tennis and waterpolo for Argentina.

== Notable Scottish Argentines ==
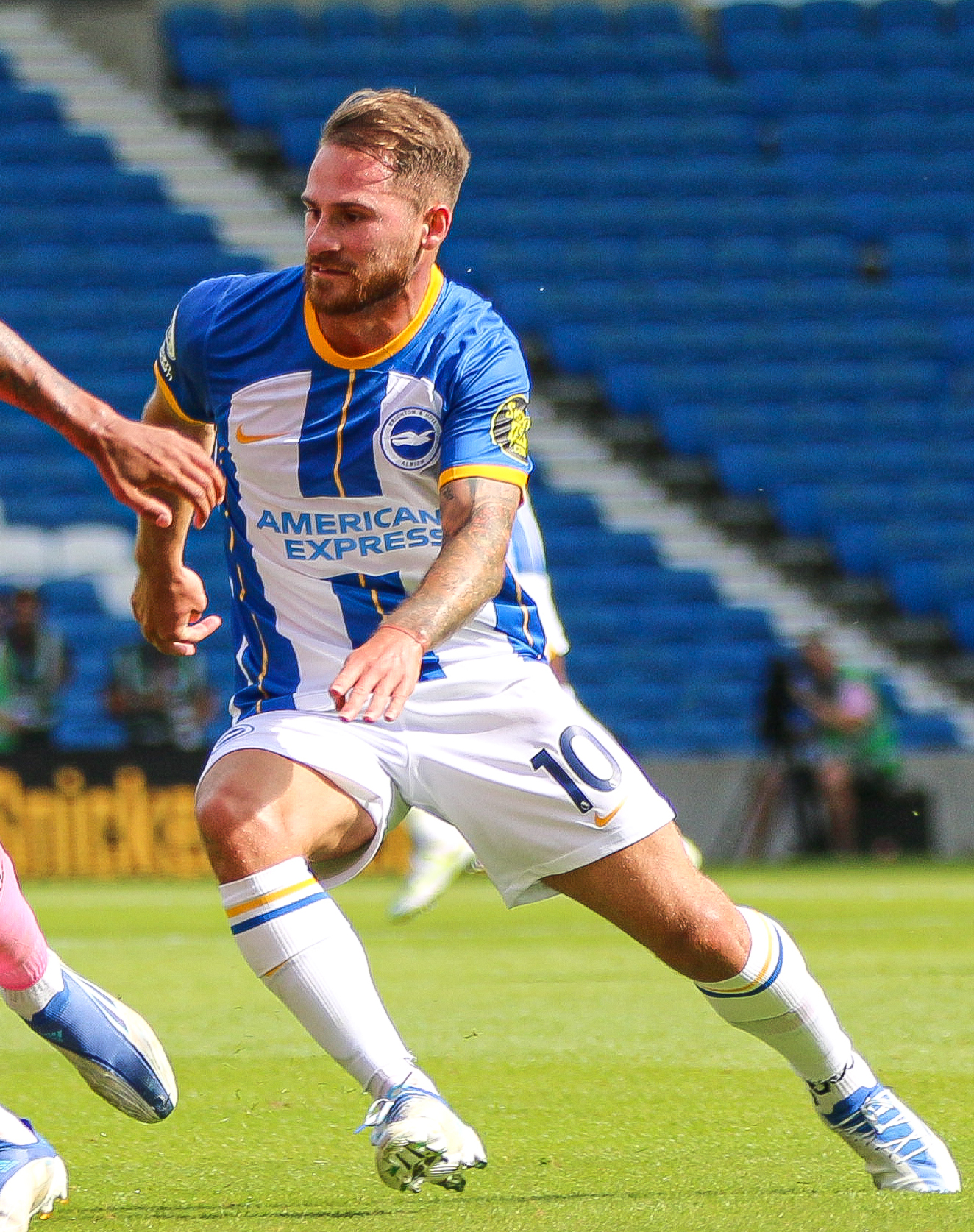
Alexis Mac Allister is a notable Argentine football player with Scottish and Irish ancestry. In a previous interview, he confirmed some of his ancestors arrived in Argentina from Ireland and stated that he is aware of links to Scotland. His ancestors can be traced to Donabate, in County Dublin, Ireland. He can also trace ancestry to Fife in Eastern Scotland.

- Alejandro Anderson, actor
- Andrew Graham-Yooll, author
- John Joseph Jolly Kyle, chemist, for whom the Premio "Dr. Juan J. J. Kyle" is named.
- Carlos Mac Allister, association football player, politician
- Alexis Mac Allister, association football player
- Duncan Stewart, Buenos Aires-born President of Uruguay
- Eduardo Mac Entyre, artist
- Franco Niell, association football player
- Jorge Brown, association football player
- José Luis Brown, association football player
- Luca Prodan, musician
- Roberto M. Levingston, General and de facto President of Argentina
- Walter Owen, translator
- Miguel Rolando Covian, Argentine physiologist, born in Rufino, Santa Fe province, medical educator and writer, translator
- Anya Taylor-Joy, actress
- Enrique Ernesto Shaw. Argentine businessman

== See also ==
- Argentines of European descent
- St. Andrew's Scots School
- University of San Andrés
- English Argentine
- Y Wladfa
