= 1912 Argentine Primera División final =

1912 Primera División final
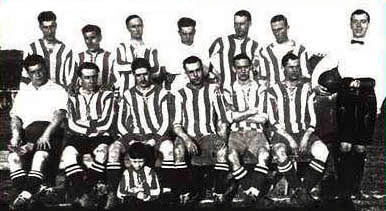
- A Porteño team of 1912
- Event: 1912 Primera División (FAF)
Porteño	Independiente
1	1
- Porteño was crowned champions after the Independiente players abandoned the field.
- Date: 23 December 1912
- Venue: Estadio GEBA, Buenos Aires
- Referee: Carlos Aertz

The 1912 Argentine Primera División final was the match that determined the winner of 1912 season of Argentine Primera División. The championship was organised by dissident body Federación Argentina de Football (FAF), which had been established that same year after several disagreements with the Argentine Football Association.

The final was contested by C.A. Porteño and C.A. Independiente, in order to decide a champion after both teams had finished tied on points (20 points in 14 matches played) at the end of the tournament. Although Independiente finished the season with a larger goal difference (+21) than Porteño (+14) the FAF scheduled a playoff to crown a champion after a request from C.A. Independiente.

It was the 1st. league final contested by Independiente, and the second by Porteño (lost to Alumni) in 1911). It was held in neutral venue (Estadio GEBA of Gimnasia y Esgrima de Buenos Aires, then one of the main sports venues in the city). Porteño was crowned champions after Independiente players left the field in protest.

== Qualified teams ==
Team	Previous finals app.
Porteño	1911
Independiente	(none)

Bold indicates winning years

== Venue ==
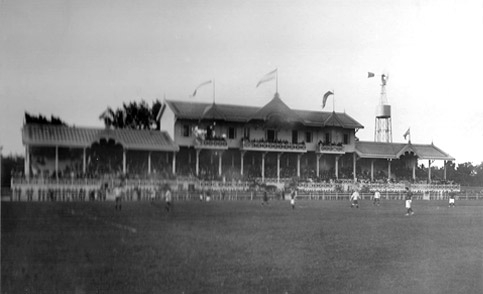
Estadio GEBA, venue

Estadio GEBA, owned by Gimnasia y Esgrima de Buenos Aires. was (along with Sociedad Sportiva Argentina) one of the main football venues in the 1900s and 1910s, having held matches of the Argentina national team and some club matches during that period. The football team of the club (that played in Primera División from 1911 to 1917) also used the stadium (which had a capacity of 10,000) for its home games.

From 1925 on, the stadium mainly hosted rugby union matches. During 45 years it would be the most frequent venue for that sport, with the Argentina national team playing there its international games. In 1927, the stadium hosted its first international rugby match when Argentina played v the British Isles during their second visit to the country.

Nowadays, Estadio GEBA is used for music concerts, having hosted many artists performing there.

== Background ==
The 1912 season was the debut of Independiente in Primera División after having been promoted by the Association due to the dissolution of Alumni. The team finished in the first place after a 9–2–3 record, while Porteño shared the first place after an 8–4–2 record. In the last fixture, Independiente was obliged to defeat Argentino de Quilmes to finish in the first position after Porteño defeated Gimnasia y Esgrima de Buenos Aires. The Rojos easily beat the Mate 5–0, nevertheless there were rumours that Argentino had fielded a weak squad in order to favour Independiente. Thus the executive committee of Independiente requested FAF to play a tie breaker vs Porteño, which was recognised as a gesture of sportsmanship.

== Match ==
The playoff was held on Sunday 22 December 1912 in GEBA. With only 2 minutes playing, Bartolomé Lloveras scored the first goal of the match for Independiente. In the second half, goalkeeper Juan José Rithner scored for the 1–1 draw after a penalty kick awarded to Porteño. With only 3 minutes remaining, Rithner got into his own goal with the ball in his hands after being collided by some rival players. Referee Carlos Aertz considered it a foul and did not award a goal for Independiente. His decision caused strong protests from the Independiente players so the referee sent off Enrique Colla, Juan Idiarte, and Ernesto Sande.

The eight remaining Independiente players left the field out of protest against the referee's decision so the match was not resumed. Some days later, the FAF confirmed the refeee's decision, awarding C.A. Porteño their first league title.

=== Details ===
1912 Primera División (FAF) Final
23 December 1912

Porteño	1–1 suspended at 87'	Independiente
Rithner 40' (pen.)	Report	Lloveras 2'

Estadio GEBA, Buenos Aires
Referee: Carlos Aertz

**Porteño**
**Independiente**

GK	Juan José Rithner
DF	H. Viboud
DF	R. González
MF	V. Abadía
MF	P. Rithner
MF	B. Berisso
FW	Mario Genoud
FW	Antonio Piaggio
FW	Abecaisis Galup Lanús
FW	Antonio Márquez
FW	F. Ramos

GK	(England) William Peterson
DF	(Argentina) Juan Idiarte	(red card) 42'
DF	(Argentina) Pedro Calneggia
MF	(Argentina) Manuel Deluchi
MF	(Argentina) Ernesto Sande	(red card) 42'
MF	(Argentina) Agustín Lanata
FW	(Uruguay) Zoilo Canavery
FW	(Argentina) Bartolomé Lloveras
FW	(Argentina) José Rodríguez
FW	(Argentina) Enrique Colla	(red card) 42'
FW	(Argentina) Francisco Roldán

== Aftermath ==
On AFA Bulletin n° 751, dated August 26, 1942, it was established: "...that the Association order the minting and delivery of the eleven gold medals that the former Argentine Football Federation was unable to award to the players of the Porteño club that crowned Primera División champions in 1912". The 1942 Annual Report made it clear that the AFA did so "in its capacity as successor to the defunct entities". By the time Porteño players were awarded medals, the club had disaffiliated from AFA eleven years earlier (abandoned the practise of football, focusing on rugby).

In the end, 18 gold medals were awarded to the 1912 and 1914 champions. Seven of its players had played for the Argentina national football team: Juan José Rithner, Antonio Piaggio, Antonio Márquez, Vicente Abadía, Ernesto Galup Lanús, Carlos Izaguirre, and Roberto González Ezcarrá.
