= 1918 Tie Cup final =

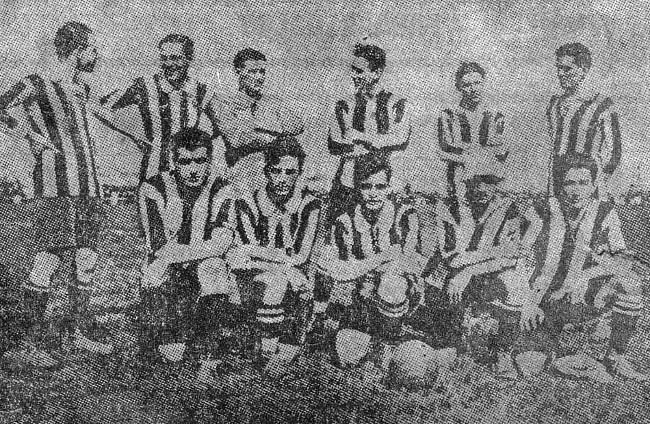
- Team of Wanderers, champions
- Event: 1918 Tie Cup
Porteño	Wanderers
(Argentina)	(Uruguay)
1	2
- Date: 1 December 1918
- Venue: Estadio GEBA, Buenos Aires

The 1918 Tie Cup final was the final match to decide the winner of the Tie Cup, the 19th edition of the international competition organised by the Argentine and Uruguayan Associations together. The final was contested by Argentine side Porteño and Uruguayan club Wanderers,

In the match, played at Estadio GEBA in Palermo, Buenos Aires, Wanderers beat Porteño 2–1, winning its third Tie Cup trophy (and second consecutive).

== Qualified teams ==
Team	Qualification	Previous final app.
(Argentina) Porteño	1918 Copa de Competencia (A) champions	1 (1915)
(Uruguay) Wanderers	1918 Copa de Competencia (A) champions	3 (1908, **1911, 1917**)

- **Bold** indicates winning years

== Overview ==
Porteño earned its place in the final as the winner of 1918 Copa de Competencia Jockey Club, after beating Gimnasia y Esgrima (4–0), Almagro (4–2), Estudiantes de Buenos Aires (2–0), Ferro Carril Oeste (4–1) Tiro Federal (2–1 in the semifinal) and River Plate (2–1 in the final). As a curious fact, Porteño played all its matches in Palermo.

There were no goals in the first half. On 52 minutes, Pérez, in offside position, made a pass that Buffoni connected to the first goal. Four minutes later, Pérez again sent a pass that was weakily rebounded by Arrieta, allowing Landeira to score the second goal for Wanderers. The only goal of Porteño was scored by Uslenghi by a penalty kick awarded after both backs of Wanderers fouled Clark.

With that result, Wanderers crowned champion, achieving its third Tie Cup trophy.

== Match details ==
1918 Tie Cup Final
1 December 1918

Porteño (Argentina)	1–2	(Uruguay) Wanderers
Uslenghi (pen.)	Report	Buffoni 52'; Landeira 56'

Estadio GEBA, Buenos Aires

**Porteño**	**Wanderers**

GK	(Argentina) Juan José Rithner
DF	(Argentina) F. Schweizer
DF	(Argentina) E. Arrieta
MF	(Argentina) J. Ayala
MF	(Argentina) E. Uslenghi
MF	(Argentina) y V. Amorin
FW	(Argentina) E. Galup Lanús
FW	(Argentina) A. Bottaro
FW	(Argentina) E. Clarke
FW	(Argentina) E. Lizarraga
FW	(Argentina) P. Polimei

GK	(Uruguay) C. Saporiti
DF	(Uruguay) C. Anzuberru
DF	(Uruguay) A. Révori
MF	(Uruguay) A. García
MF	(Uruguay) A. Zibecchi
MF	(Uruguay) E. Chiesa
FW	(Uruguay) C. Bastos
FW	(Uruguay) F. Buffoni
FW	(Uruguay) C. Pereira
FW	(Uruguay) J. Landeira
FW	(Uruguay) O. Pérez
