= 1911 Argentine Primera División final =

1911 Primera División final
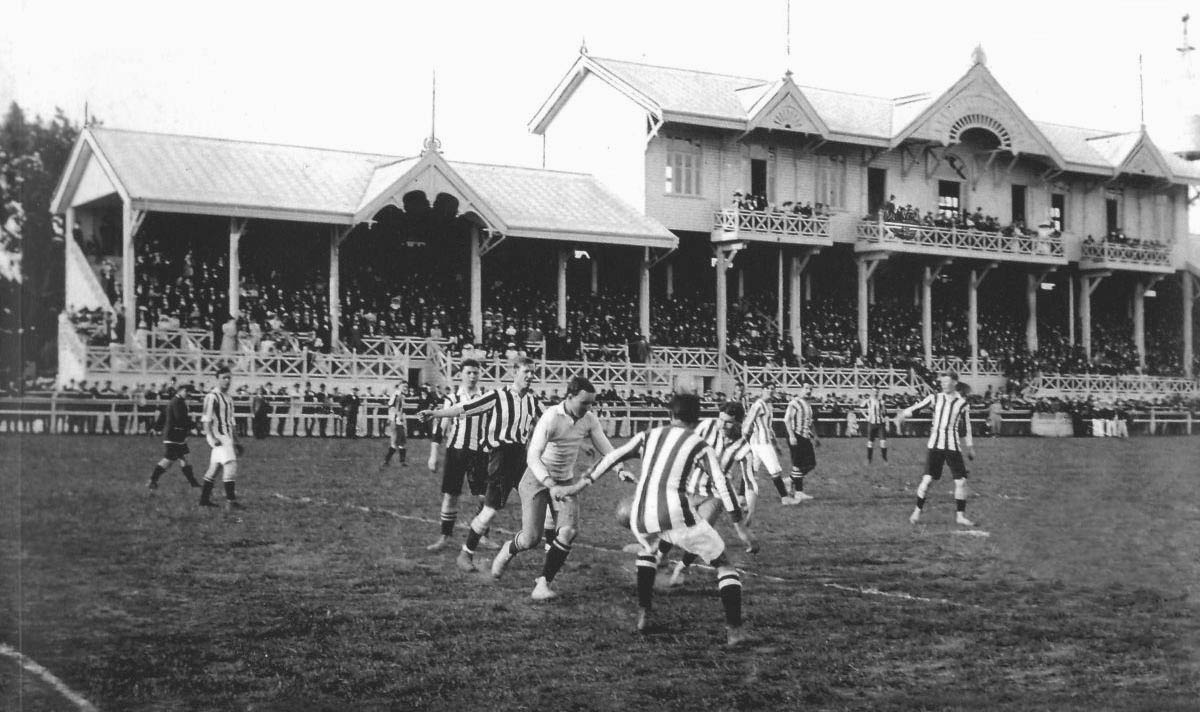
- A moment of the match; Alumni is the team wearing white shorts
- Event: 1911 Primera División
Alumni	Porteño
2	1
- Date: 26 Nov 1911
- Venue: Estadio GEBA, Buenos Aires
- Attendance: 9,000

The 1911 Argentine Primera División final was the playoff that determined the winner of 1911 season of Argentine Primera División. It was contested by Alumni and Porteño, in order to decide a champion after both teams had finished tied on points (23 points in 16 matches played) at the end of the tournament. Although Alumni finished the season with a much larger goal difference (+33) than Porteño (+14) the Argentine Football Association committee decided that a final should be held in order to crown a champion.

It was the second league final contested by Alumni after the 1906 season when the team had won the championship after beating Lomas A.C. 4–0. On the other hand, C.A. Porteño played their first final in Primera División. The match was held in neutral venue (Estadio GEBA of Gimnasia y Esgrima de Buenos Aires, then one of the main sports venues in the city). Alumni defeated Porteño 2–1 to win their 10th. league title.

The final is notable for having been the last official match played by Alumni, before being dissolved two years later.

== Qualified teams ==
Team	Previous finals app.
Alumni	**1906**
Porteño	(none)

Bold indicates winning years

== Venue ==
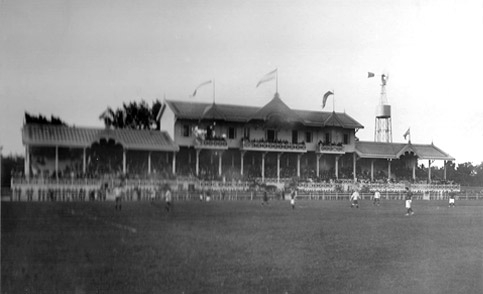
Estadio GEBA, venue

Estadio GEBA, owned by Gimnasia y Esgrima de Buenos Aires. was (along with Sociedad Sportiva Argentina) one of the main football venues in the 1900s and 1910s, having held matches of the Argentina national team and some club matches during that period. The football team of the club (that played in Primera División from 1911 to 1917) also used the stadium (which had a capacity of 10,000) for its home games.

From 1925 on, the stadium mainly hosted rugby union matches. During 45 years it would be the most frequent venue for that sport, with the Argentina national team playing there its international games. In 1927, the stadium hosted its first international rugby match when Argentina played v the British Isles during their second visit to the country.

Nowadays, Estadio GEBA is used for music concerts, having hosted many artists performing there.

== Background ==
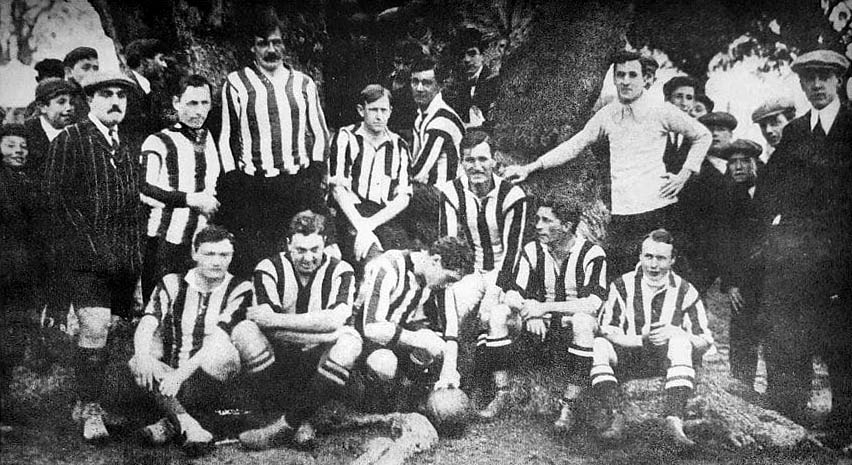
A team of Alumni of 1911

Alumni did not start the 1911 season as they used to do, suffering some defeats to C.A. Estudiantes (12) and Belgrano A.C. (0–2). Although Alumni thrahsed Quilmes (7–0) in the next fixture, the team suffered other defeats at the hands of Porteño (0–2) and Racing Club (considered by many historians its successor) (1–3), which had promoted to Primera División the previous year.

Nevertheless Alumn recovered again from those defeats, and won eleven consecutive games (including several hammerings over Racing, River Plate, and San Isidro) to finish the tournament in the first position.

On the other hand, Porteño would not win their first match until the 6th fixture, when they beat Alumni 2–0 and won other notable match including a 5–1 over Quilmes and a 4–1 to River Plate. Both teams finished in the last position with 23 points. Despite Alumni largely surpassed Porteño on goal difference, the Argentine Football Association decided that a final should be held to decide a champion.

== Match details ==
1911 Argentine Primera División Final
26 Nov 1911

Alumni	2–1	Porteño
A. Brown 38'; Weiss 55'	Report	Genoud 84'

Estadio GEBA, Buenos Aires
Attendance: 9,000

**Alumni**
**Porteño**

GK	(Argentina) Emilio Bolinches
DF	(Argentina) Juan Domingo Brown
DF	(Argentina) Jorge Brown
MF	(England) Peel Yates
MF	(Argentina) Ernesto Brown
MF	J.H. Lawrie
FW	(Argentina) V. Weiss
FW	(Argentina) Alfredo Brown
FW	(Argentina) Juan G. Brown
FW	(Argentina) Ernesto Lett
FW	(Argentina) Arnold Watson Hutton

GK	(Argentina) Juan José Rithner
DF	(Argentina) Héctor Viboud
DF	(Argentina) J. Cucchi
MF	(Argentina) B. Berisso
MF	(Argentina) Domingo Bacigaluppi
MF	(Argentina) O. Dastugue
FW	(Argentina) Mario Genoud
FW	(Argentina) Anacarsis Galup Lanús
FW	(Argentina) Antonio Piaggio
FW	(Argentina) Antonio Márquez
FW	(Argentina) F. Debenedetti

== Aftermath ==
Thank goodness there was no extra time. It would have been impossible for us to play another thirty minutes. We couldn't take it anymore!.

— Ernesto Brown about the final

In the evening there was a banquet at the now-defunct German restaurant Aue's Keller, located at Bartolomé Mitre 650. it was organised by C.A. Porteño in honor of their victors Alumni.

The final is notable for having been the last official match played by legendary Alumni. By the time of the final, Alumni was the most successful team of Argentine football, having won a total of 22 titles (10 leagues, 5 national cups, and 7 international cups). But on those times some players were already carrying the weight of a thousand battles on their shoulders and were thinking about retirement. After the final, Alumni retired from official competitions and did not field a team for the 1912 season.

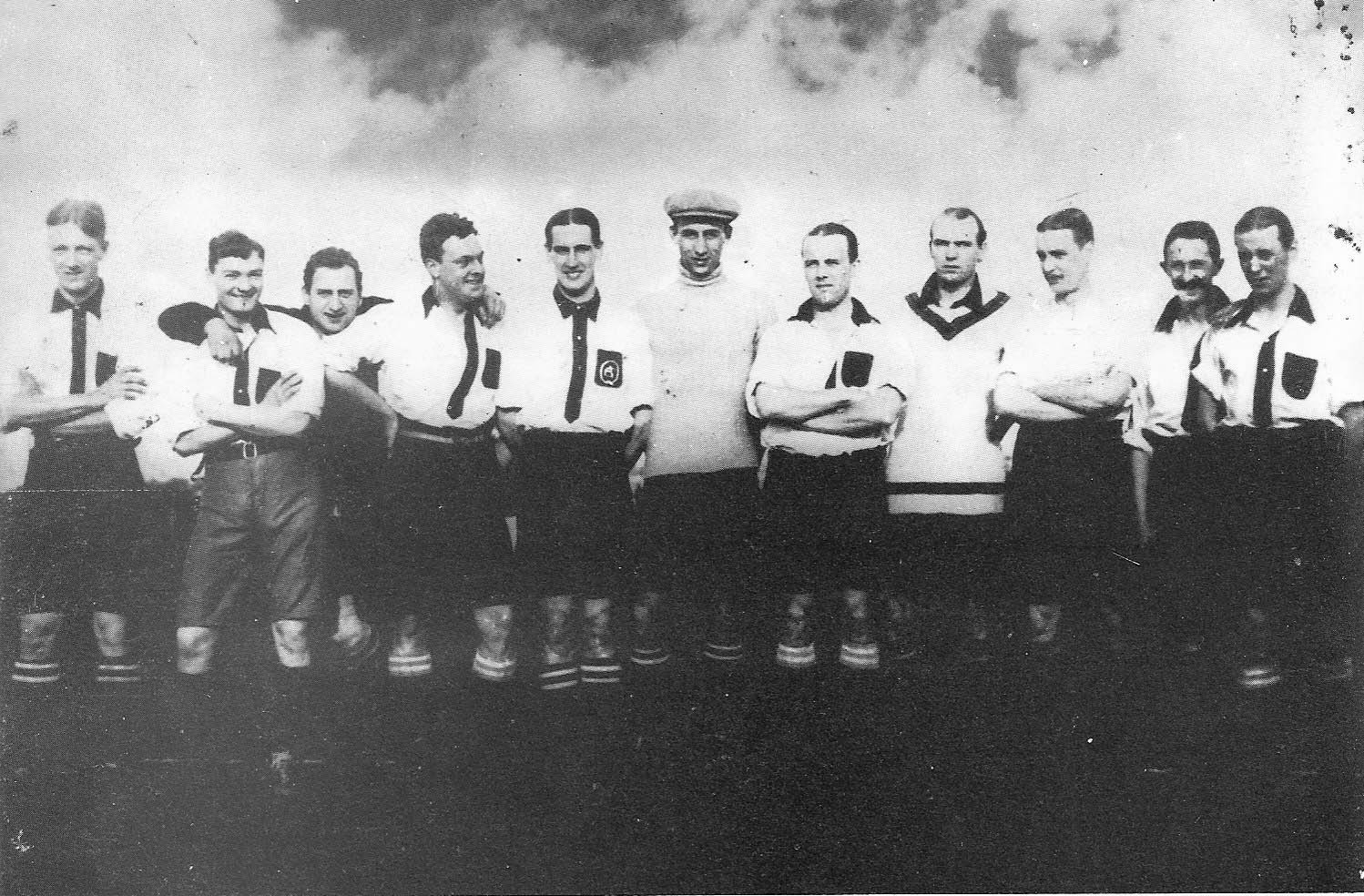
The Quilmes team of 1912 won the championship with some former Alumni players

After Alumni quit the Association, many of its players such as Jorge G. Brown, Juan D. Brown, Ernesto Brown, and Gottlob Weiss joined Quilmes Atlético Club, another team with British origins, which finally would win the first league title for the club in 1912. In successive years, Alumni players would occasionally reunite to play exhibition matches.

The club was officially dissolved on 24 April 1913 at the headquarters of Maipú street 131 Buenos Aires. At the meeting, chaired by Dr. Luis J. Rocca, the liquidation of the institution was decided upon, as "there were no fifteen members who wished to continue with the club." Ernesto A. Brown proposed allocating the funds to various charities, which was approved unanimously; the British Hospital of Buenos Aires was the most favored.
