= 1915 Tie Cup final =

Match to decide winner of the 16th Tie Cup

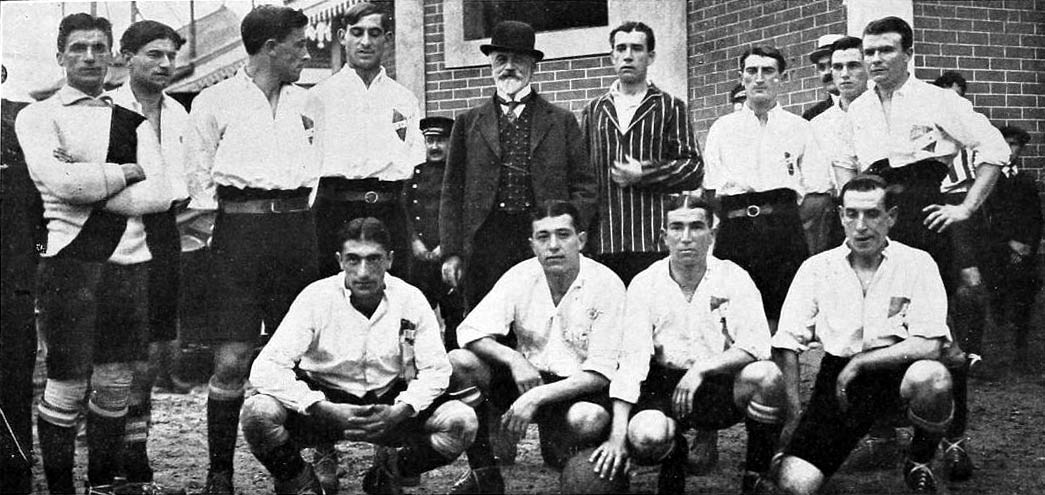
- Team of Nacional, winners
- Event: Tie Cup
Porteño	Nacional
(Argentina)	(Uruguay)
0	1
- Date: 31 October 1915
- Venue: Gimnasia y Esgrima, Buenos Aires

The 1915 Tie Cup final was the final match to decide the winner of the Tie Cup, the 16th edition of the international competition organised by the Argentine and Uruguayan Associations together. The final was contested by Argentine Porteño and Uruguayan Nacional,

In the match, played at Gimnasia y Esgrima Stadium in Palermo, Buenos Aires, Nacional beat Porteño 2–0, winning its second Tie Cup tournament.

== Qualified teams ==
Team	Qualification	Previous final app.
(Argentina) Porteño	1915 Copa de Competencia (A) champions	(none)
(Uruguay) Nacional	1915 Copa de Competencia (U) champions	1 (**1913**)

- **Bold** indicates winning years

== Overview ==
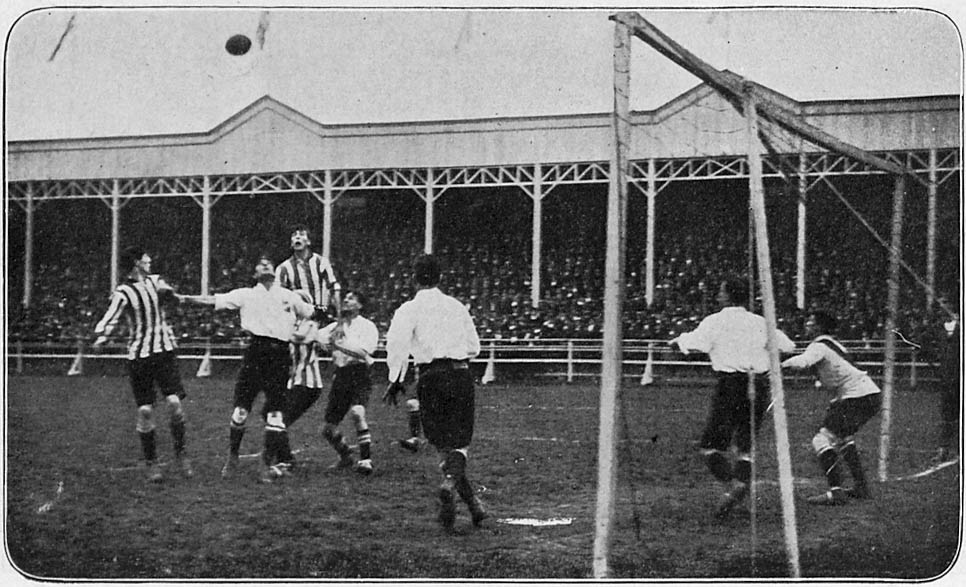
Scene of the match played at Gimnasia y Esgrima

Porteño earned its place in the final as the winner of 1915 Copa de Competencia Jockey Club, where the team beat Hispano Argentino (2–1 as visitor), Tigre (6–1 at Atlanta), Huracán (5–2 in extra time), River Plate (2–1), Rosario A.C. (1–0 in palermo) and finally, Primera División champion Racing in the final (2–1 also in Palermo).

Fans waited for the match with great expectations due to the great performance of Porteño in the local competition cup. The match was held in Gimnasia y Esgrima on 31 October, 1915, with a huge attendance of 8,000. Nevertheless, it was Nacional the team that opened the score when on 30 minutes, Carlos Scarone shot but the ball hit the goal post. As Porteño goalkeeper Rithner could not catch the ball on time, Pablo Dacal anticipated him to score the first goal of the match.

Only four minutes later, Nacional scored for second time when Somma made a long pass to Scarone, who shot to the goal. With no goals scored in the second half, Nacional won its second tie Cup trophy. According to what the press of the time reported, Nacional was a fair winner.

== Match details ==
1915 Tie Cup Final
31 October 1915

Porteño (Argentina)	0–2	(Uruguay) Nacional
	Report	Dacal 30'; Scarone 34'

Estadio GEBA, Buenos Aires
Attendance: 8,000
Referee: Hugo Gondra

**Porteño**	**Nacional**

GK	(Argentina) Juan José Rithner
DF	(Argentina) R. González Escarrá
DF	(Argentina) O. Beltrame
MF	(Argentina) J. Ayala
MF	(Argentina) E. Uslenghi
MF	(Argentina) V. Abadia
FW	(Argentina) E. Galup Lanús
FW	(Argentina) C. Izaguirre
FW	(Argentina) A. Piaggio
FW	(Argentina) M. Garat
FW	(Argentina) M. Genoud

GK	(Uruguay) Santiago Demarchi
DF	(Uruguay) Francisco Castelino
DF	(Uruguay) Alfredo Foglino
MF	(Uruguay) Alberto Olivari
MF	(Uruguay) Abdón Porte
MF	(Uruguay) José Vanzzino
FW	(Uruguay) Pascual Somma
FW	(Uruguay) Pablo Dacal
FW	(Uruguay) Ángel Romano
FW	(Uruguay) Carlos Scarone
FW	(Uruguay) José Brachi
