= Wake Up the Souls Tour =

2015 concert tour by System of a Down

- Tour by System of a Down
- Location: North America; Europe; Latin America
- Start date: April 6, 2015
- End date: October 6, 2015
- Legs: 4
- No. of shows: 19

System of a Down concert chronology
- Reunion Tour (2011–2015); Wake Up the Souls Tour (2015)

The Wake Up the Souls Tour was a concert tour by American rock band System of a Down, which commenced in April 2015. The tour was to commemorate the 100th anniversary of the Armenian genocide and raise awareness of the events which saw roughly 1.5 million Armenians killed by the Ottoman Empire government in 1915.

== Background ==
Having announced that they would headline the 2014 KROQ Almost Acoustic Christmas concert, they then announced that they would headline the Rock in Rio festival in Brazil the following September. Rumours then began to spread about a possible full world tour & maybe a new album, particularly because of drummer John Dolmayan's strange but choreographed tweets gradually counting down to the announcement on November 24, 2014. He tweeted the day before "T-Y-W-K" which led many to believe he meant "tomorrow you will know".

The tour started with one stop in North America. System revealed in November 2014 the 'Wake Up The Souls Tour,' scheduled to begin on April 10 at the Wembley Arena in London and finish on April 23 for the band's first ever show in their ethnic homeland of Armenia. Their performance in the capital city of Yerevan at the Republic Square was a free show.

The main objective of the tour was to create awareness and recognition of the genocide to the entire world, particularly in Turkey, whose government does not fully recognise the genocide the preceding Ottoman Empire conducted. The band's announcement on their website called for the Turkish people who stand with the band on the issue of the Armenian genocide to speak out and raise awareness of it.

== Tour dates ==
Date	City	Country	Venue
North America
April 6, 2015	Inglewood	United States	The Forum
Europe
April 10, 2015	London	England	Wembley Arena
April 13, 2015	Cologne	Germany	Lanxess Arena
April 14, 2015	Lyon	France	Halle Tony Garnier
April 16, 2015	Brussels	Belgium	Forest National
April 17, 2015	Amsterdam	Netherlands	Ziggo Dome
April 20, 2015	Moscow	Russia	SK Olympiyskiy
April 23, 2015	Yerevan	Armenia	Republic Square
North America
June 17, 2015	Detroit	United States	DTE Energy Music Theatre
June 19, 2015	Toronto	Canada	Molson Canadian Amphitheatre
June 20, 2015	Montebello	Canada	Amnesia Rockfest
August 29, 2015	Denver	United States	Riot Fest
September 12, 2015	Chicago	United States	Riot Fest
Latin America
September 24, 2015	Rio de Janeiro	Brazil	Rock in Rio
September 25, 2015	São Paulo	Brazil	Arena Anhembi
September 28, 2015	Santiago	Chile	Santiago Gets Louder
September 30, 2015	Buenos Aires	Argentina	Estadio G.E.B.A.
October 3, 2015	Bogotá	Colombia	Parque Deportivo
October 6, 2015	Mexico City	Mexico	Palacio de Deportes
