= 1993 South American Rugby Championship =

18° Campeonato Sudamericano de Rugby
- Date: 25 September– 23 October 1993
- Countries: Argentina; Brazil; Chile; Paraguay; Uruguay

Final positions
- Champions: Argentina
- Runner-up: Uruguay

Tournament statistics
- Matches played: 10

The 1993 South American Rugby Championship was the 18th edition of the competition of the leading national rugby union teams in South America.

For the second time, the tournament was not played in a host country, but at different venues in each country participating.

Argentina won the tournament.

The six matches between Argentina, Uruguay, Chile and Paraguay were also valid for the pool for 1995 Rugby World Cup qualifying.

== Standings ==
Team	Played	Won	Drawn	Lost	For	Against	Difference	Pts
Argentina	4	4	0	0	254	23	+ 231	8
Uruguay	4	3	0	1	146	33	+ 113	6
Paraguay	4	2	0	2	80	163	83	4
Chile	4	1	0	3	72	135	63	2
Brazil	4	0	0	4	55	253	198	0

== Results ==
25 September 1993

Brazil	5–55	Uruguay

São Paulo Athletic, São Paulo

26 September 1993

Chile	24–25	Paraguay

Santiago

2 October 1993

Paraguay	3–67	Uruguay

C.U.R.D.A., Asunción

2 October 1993

Brazil	3–114	Argentina

São Paulo Athletic, São Paulo

9 October 1993

Uruguay	14–6	Chile

Carrasco Polo, Montevideo

10 October 1993

Paraguay	49–21	Brazil

Asunción

11 October 1993

Argentina	70–7	Chile

Estadio GEBA, Buenos Aires

15 October 1993

Chile	37–26	Brazil

Santiago

16 October 1993

Argentina	51–3	Paraguay

Estadio GEBA, Buenos Aires

23 October 1993

Uruguay	10–19	Argentina

Parque Central, Montevideo
