= 1916 Copa Aldao =

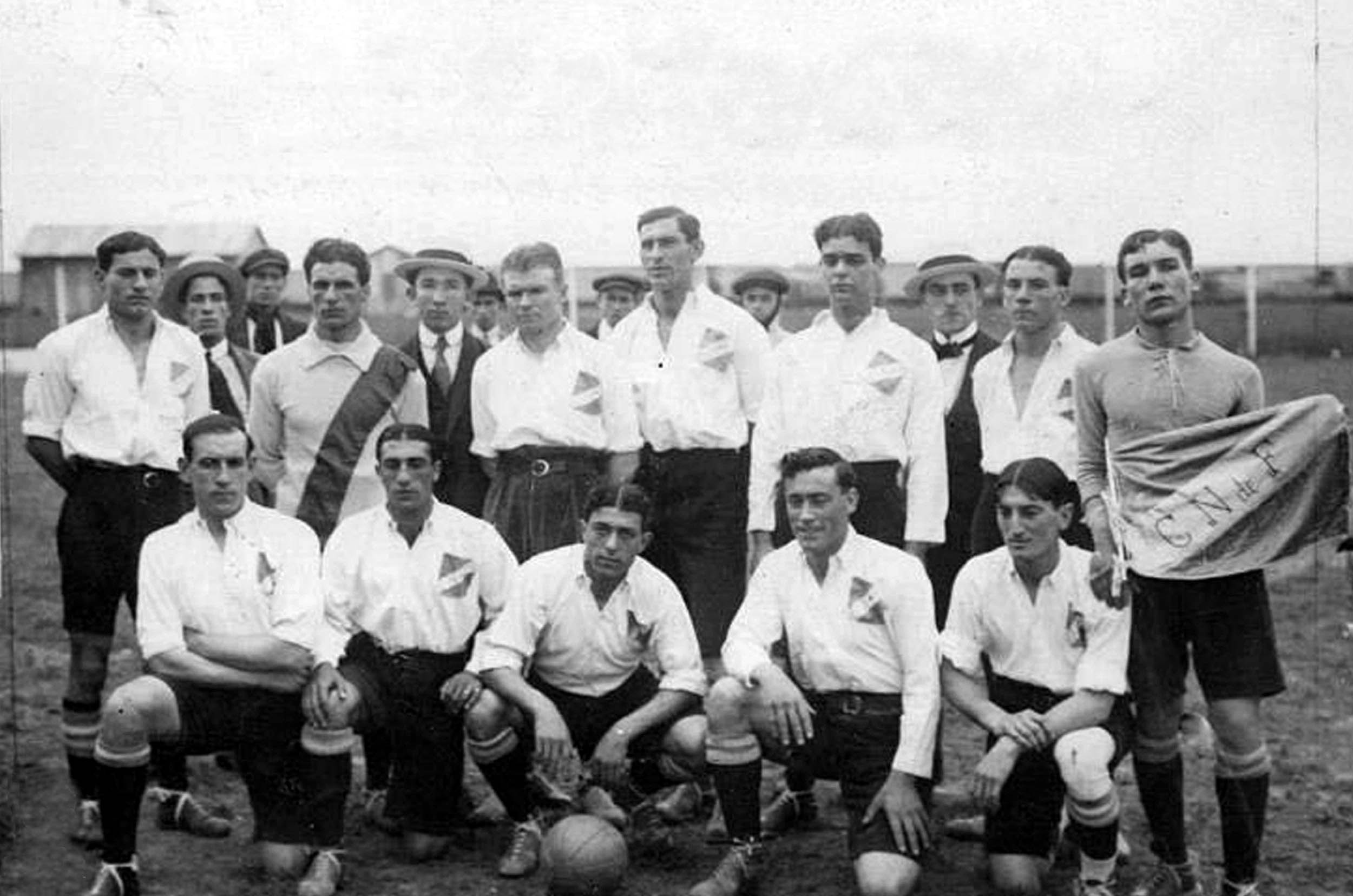
- A Nacional team of 1916
- Event: Copa Aldao
Racing	Nacional
(Argentina)	(Uruguay)
1	2
- Date: December 3, 1916
- Venue: Gimnasia y Esgrima, Buenos Aires
- Referee: Hugo Gondra

The 1916 Copa Aldao was a football club competition between Racing and Nacional on December 3 of this very year. It was the second staging of this tournament contested between the league champions of Argentina and Uruguay.

Nacional became champions for the first time after defeating Racing 2–1 in a single match.

== Qualified teams ==
Team	Qualification	Previous finals app.
(Argentina) Racing	1916 Primera División champions	None
(Uruguay) Nacional	1916 Primera División champions	None

== Rules ==
The cup was played over one leg at neutral venue in Buenos Aires. In case of a draw, a rematch would be played in Montevideo.

== Venue ==
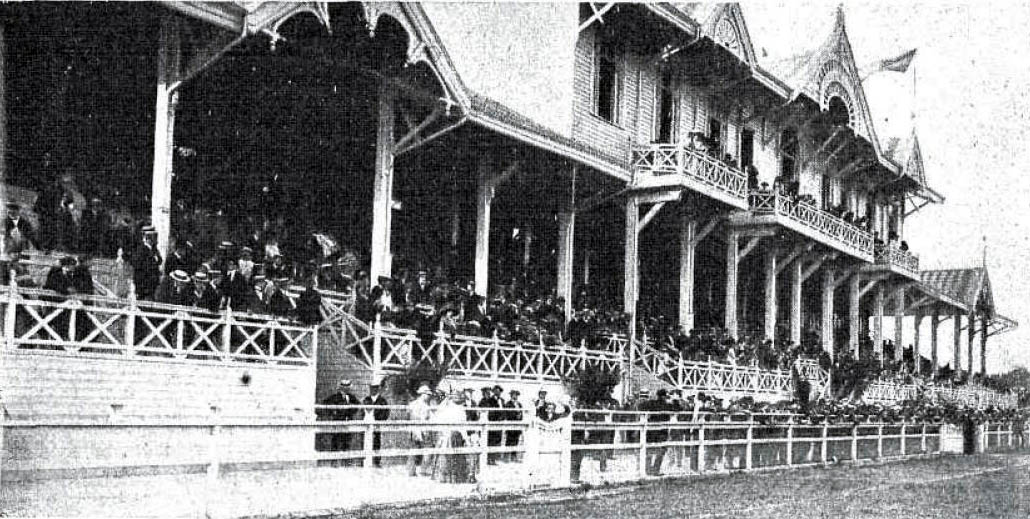
Estadio GEBA, venue

== Match details ==
1916 Copa Aldao
December 3, 1916

Racing (Argentina)	1–2	(Uruguay) Nacional
Hospital 63'		Romano 48' 81'

Gimnasia y Esgrima, Buenos Aires
Referee: Hugo Gondra

Racing	Nacional

GK	(Argentina) Sylla Arduino
DF	(Argentina) Armando Reyes
DF	(Argentina) Juan Viazzi
MF	(Argentina) Alberto Marcovecchio
MF	(Argentina) Francisco Olazar
MF	(Argentina) Ricardo Pepe
FW	(Uruguay) Zoilo Canavery
FW	(Argentina) Nicolás Vivaldo
FW	(Argentina) Alberto Ohaco
FW	(Argentina) Juan Hospital
FW	(Argentina) Juan Perinetti

GK	(Uruguay) Santiago Demarchi
DF	(Uruguay) Ramón Pesquera
DF	(Uruguay) Alfredo Foglino
MF	(Uruguay) Pedro Olivieri
MF	(Uruguay) Abdón Porte
MF	(Uruguay) José Vanzzino
FW	(Uruguay) José Bracchi
FW	(Uruguay) Héctor Scarone
FW	(Uruguay) Ángel Romano
FW	(Uruguay) Carlos Scarone
FW	(Uruguay) Pascual Somma
