= Enrique Colla =

Argentine footballer (born c.1890)

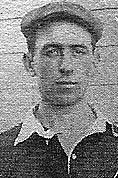

Personal information
- Date of birth: c.1890
- Place of birth: Buenos Aires, Argentina
- Date of death: ?
- Place of death: Buenos Aires, Argentina
- Position: Forward

Youth career
- 1908–1914: Independiente

Senior career*
Years	Team	Apps	(Gls)
1915–1917	Boca Juniors		
1918	San Lorenzo		
1919	Argentino de Banfield		

International career
1913	Argentina	1	
- * Club domestic league appearances and goals

Enrique Colla was an Argentine football player. His position on the field was forward. Colla played for Independiente, Boca Juniors and San Lorenzo.

== Playing career ==
He began his career playing for the Independiente, where he was top scorer in the 1912 season, where he scored 12 goals in dissident Federación Argentina de Football.

On 14 March 1915, Colla made his debut playing in Boca Juniors, he played until 1917 in the Xeneize team, playing several superclásicos against River Plate. Then he continued his career in San Lorenzo de Almagro and Argentino de Banfield.

There are ten known games that Colla played for Boca. The first was on January 7, 1917, and the last was on December 16, 1917. In his Boca career, he won one game, lost five, and tied four.
