= System of a Down Reunion Tour =

2011–15 concert tour

- Tour by System of a Down
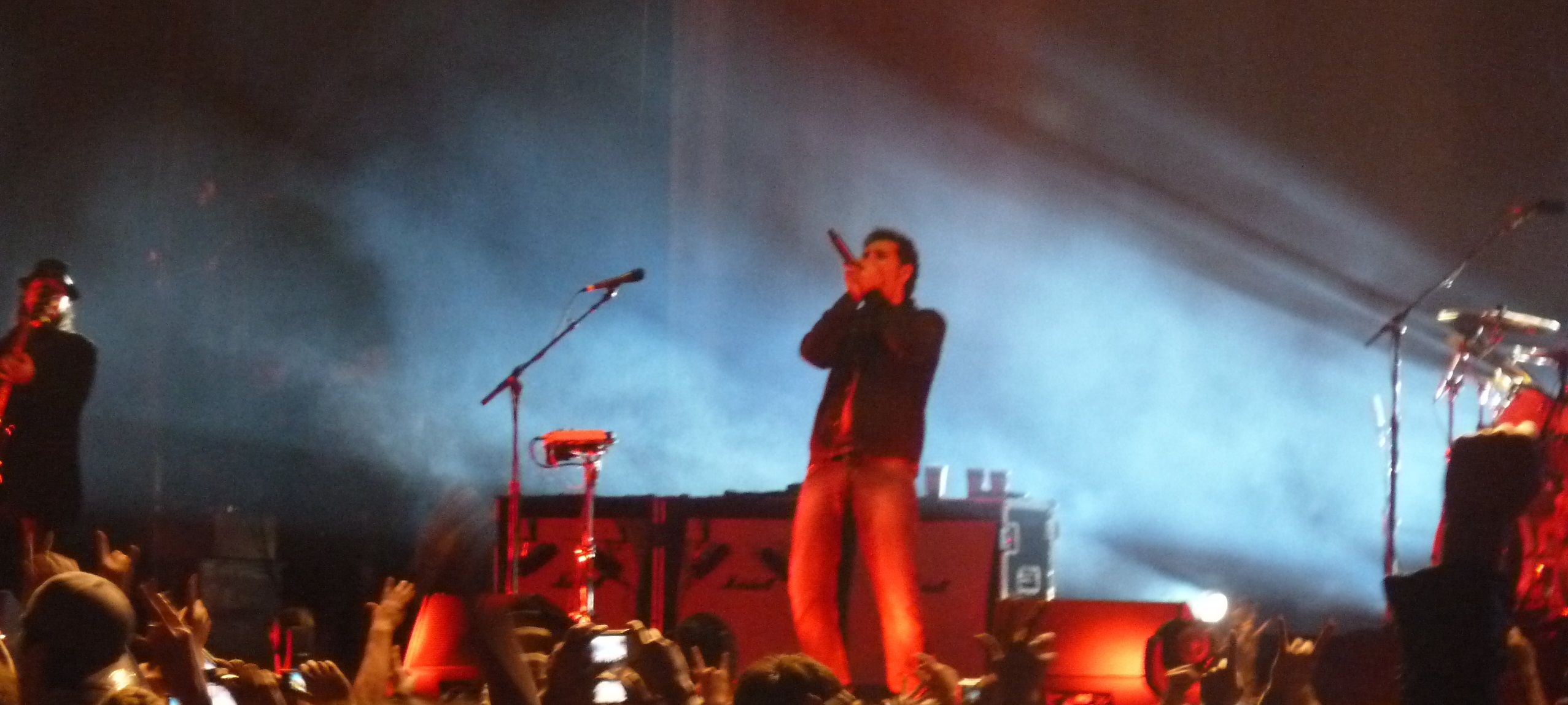
- System of a Down in Santiago, Chile on October 7, 2011
- Location: North America; Europe; South America; Oceania
- Start date: May 10, 2011
- End date: June 18, 2015
- Legs: 9
- No. of shows: 33 in Europe; 21 in North America; 8 in Oceania; 6 in South America; 68 in total

System of a Down concert chronology
- Mezmerize/Hypnotize Tour (2005–2006); System of a Down Reunion Tour (2011–2015); Wake Up the Souls Tour (2015)

The Reunion Tour is a concert tour by American rock band System of a Down, celebrating the band's reunion, after going on hiatus in 2006.

== Background ==
Following several weeks of internet rumors, the reunion of the band was officially announced on November 29, 2010, when several European festival dates in June 2011 were announced. Later, the band confirmed a show in Moscow, Russia on June 21, 2011. More European dates were later announced, with several North American headlining dates for May 2011 being announced on March 1, 2011. On March 21, 2011, the band announced a concert in Irvine, California, on May 25, 2011.

On February 9, 2011, Shavo Odadjian posted on his Twitter profile: "Just finished up our first rehearsal in 5 years. Amazing! !! I love my band."

On April 7, 2011, System of a Down commented on their official website: "We want to know which songs you most want to hear on the road this summer. As a reward for telling us your top 6 setlist requests, one winner from each tour city will win a pair of tickets to his/her local show. They will also win a setlist from the show they attended, signed by all of us." On April 19, 2011, posted this: "For each date of the upcoming SOAD North American and EU Headline Tour, we are auctioning a pair of tickets, plus a personal lunch with John Dolmayan. All proceeds will benefit Music For Relief's Earthquake and Tsunami Relief efforts in Japan. [...] In addition, John will be auctioning off his personal drum kit at the end of the tour. The kit will be autographed by John and a collection of other noted drummers... More details coming soon."

On May 6, 2011, the band confirmed a show in Brazil, Rock in Rio Festival, on October 2, 2011, and in July, the band announced four headline shows in Latin America, with one more show in Brazil, and one in Mexico, Argentina and Chile.

On May 14, 2011, The Pulse of Radio, made an interview with the band's drummer John Dolmayan. He was said about the band's five-year hiatus, "I personally don't like breaks - I like to continue playing. But it was nice to go off and be John Dolmayan, as opposed to John from System, for a while. I think everybody had similar feelings."

Asked in October 2011 whether System of a Down will record a new album, drummer John Dolmayan replied, "We're gonna take it day by day. We still have a few more shows to do in South America — we're playing in Buenos Aires and we're playing Santiago, so we're looking forward to that. And then we're gonna go home. We don't generally work during Christmas and New Year's — that's a time for our family and stuff — so we'll be home for the next three or four months. And then Serj takes off and goes to New Zealand for a couple of months — he lives part time in New Zealand. And then I think he's got another solo album coming out next summer. So you might see System touring next summer, you might not. But for the people who are waiting for an album — I know there's a lot of people waiting for an album; I'm waiting for an album just like they are. It's gonna happen when it's right and when we can make something that tops what we've done in the past. Because we don't really wanna rest on our laurels — where what you've done in the past is what you depend on. Well, I don't wanna do that, and I know the rest of the guys don't wanna do that. Instead of resting on our laurels, we wanna throw them away and create something new and specific for this generation that they can say that's their System of a Down."

System of a Down was going to be one of the headliners for 2012's Soundwave festival. This was the first visit in Australia in seven years. Besides the Soundwave festival dates, the band was play three headlining shows in Oceania. The band was headlining the 2012's Heavy MTL Festival in Montreal and Heavy T.O. Festival in Toronto.

On April 23, 2012, System of a Down announced a slate of North American tour dates with special guest, Deftones.

The band played on the 2013's Kubana Festival in Russia, the Getaway Rock Festival in Sweden, the Jurassic Rock Festival in Finland, the Aerodrome Festival in Prague, the Frequency Festival in Austria, the Rock 'N' Heim and Rock im Pott Festivals in Germany, the Rock en Seine in Paris, the Reading and Leeds Festivals in the UK and also play in Poland, the Netherlands and Italy in August.

On November 10, 2014, System of a Down announced that they will be headlining Night One of KROQ's Almost Acoustic Christmas on December 13, 2014 at the Los Angeles Forum.

On November 17, 2014, they announced two more headlining shows: the Olympisky Stadium in Moscow, Russia on April 20, 2015 and the Rock in Rio festival in Rio de Janeiro, Brazil on September 24, 2015.

== Tour dates ==
Date	City	Country	Venue
North America
May 10, 2011	Edmonton	Canada	Rexall Place
May 12, 2011	Vancouver	Canada	Rogers Arena
May 13, 2011	Seattle	United States	KeyArena
May 15, 2011	Mountain View	United States	Shoreline Amphitheatre
May 18, 2011	Greenwood Village	United States	Comfort Dental Amphitheatre
May 19, 2011	Albuquerque	United States	The Pavilion
May 21, 2011	Chula Vista	United States	Cricket Wireless Amphitheatre
May 22, 2011	Paradise	United States	Pearl Concert Theater
May 24, 2011	Inglewood	United States	The Forum
May 25, 2011	Irvine	United States	Verizon Wireless Amphitheatre
Europe
June 2, 2011	Milan	Italy	Fiera Open Air Arena
June 4, 2011	Nuremberg	Germany	Rock im Park
June 5, 2011	Nürburg	Germany	Rock am Ring
June 6, 2011	Paris	France	Palais Omnisports de Paris-Bercy
June 8, 2011	Paris	France	Palais Omnisports de Paris-Bercy
June 9, 2011	Interlaken	Switzerland	Greenfield Festival
June 11, 2011	Leicestershire	England	Download Festival
June 13, 2011	Nickelsdorf	Austria	Nova Rock Festival
June 15, 2011	Berlin	Germany	Kindl-Bühne Wuhlheide
June 17, 2011	Gothenburg	Sweden	Metaltown Festival
June 19, 2011	Seinäjoki	Finland	Provinssirock
June 21, 2011	Moscow	Russia	Olympic Stadium
Latin America
September 28, 2011	Mexico City	Mexico	Palacio de los Deportes
October 1, 2011	São Paulo	Brazil	Chacara Do Joquei
October 2, 2011	Rio de Janeiro	Brazil	Rock in Rio
October 5, 2011	Buenos Aires	Argentina	Estadio G.E.B.A.
October 7, 2011	Santiago	Chile	Estadio Bicentenario de La Florida
Oceania ("Soundwave Festival")
February 22, 2012^{[1]}	Auckland	New Zealand	Trusts Stadium
February 25, 2012	Brisbane	Australia	RNA Showgrounds
February 26, 2012	Sydney	Australia	Sydney Olympic Park
February 28, 2012^{[1]}	Sydney	Australia	Sydney Entertainment Centre
February 29, 2012^{[1]}	Melbourne	Australia	Rod Laver Arena
March 2, 2012	Melbourne	Australia	Melbourne Showgrounds
March 3, 2012	Adelaide	Australia	Bonython Park
March 5, 2012	Perth	Australia	Claremont Showground
North America, leg #2
August 2, 2012	Camden	United States	Susquehanna Bank Center
August 4, 2012	Holmdel Township	United States	PNC Bank Arts Center
August 5, 2012	Wantagh	United States	Nikon at Jones Beach Theater
August 7, 2012	Washington, D.C.	United States	Verizon Center
August 9, 2012	Mansfield	United States	Comcast Center
August 11, 2012	Montreal	Canada	Heavy MTL Festival
August 12, 2012	Toronto	Canada	Heavy T.O. Festival
August 14, 2012	Clarkston	United States	DTE Energy Music Theatre
August 15, 2012	Rosemont	United States	Allstate Arena
July 29, 2013	Los Angeles	United States	Hollywood Bowl
Europe, leg #2
August 7, 2013	Anapa	Russia	Kubana Festival
August 9, 2013	Gävle	Sweden	Getaway Rock Festival
August 11, 2013	Mikkeli	Finland	Jurassic Rock Festival
August 13, 2013	Łódź	Poland	Atlas Arena
August 14, 2013	Prague	Czech Republic	Aerodrome Festival
August 16, 2013	Sankt Pölten	Austria	Frequency Festival
August 17, 2013	Hockenheim	Germany	Rock 'N' Heim
August 18, 2013	Gelsenkirchen	Germany	Rock Im Pott
August 20, 2013	Berlin	Germany	Kindl-Bühne Wuhlheide
August 21, 2013	Amsterdam	Netherlands	Ziggo Dome
August 23, 2013	Reading	England	Reading Festival
August 24, 2013	Leeds	England	Leeds Festival
August 25, 2013	Paris	France	Rock en Seine
August 27, 2013	Milan	Italy	Fiera Open Air Arena
North America, KROQ Almost Acoustic Christmas
December 13, 2014	Inglewood	United States	The Forum
Wake Up the Souls Tour
April 6, 2015	Inglewood	United States	The Forum
April 10, 2015	London	England	SSE Arena, Wembley
April 13, 2015	Cologne	Germany	Lanxess Arena
April 14, 2015	Lyon	France	Halle Tony Garnier
April 16, 2015	Brussels	Belgium	Forest National
April 17, 2015	Amsterdam	Netherlands	Ziggo Dome
April 20, 2015	Moscow	Russia	Olympic Stadium
April 23, 2015	Yerevan	Armenia	Republic Square
North America, leg #3
June 17, 2015	Clarkston	United States	DTE Energy Music Theatre
June 18, 2015	Montebello	Canada	Amnesia Rock Fest

- 1 Headline dates, non Soundwave Festival appearance.

== Formation ==
- Daron Malakian - guitars, vocals
- Serj Tankian - lead vocals, keyboards, guitars
- Shavo Odadjian - bass guitar, backing vocals
- John Dolmayan - drums

== Support acts ==
- Gogol Bordello (May 10–25, 2011)
- Anti-Flag (June 2, 2011)
- Danzig (June 2, 2011)
- Sick of It All (June 2, 2011)
- Volbeat (June 2, 2011)
- ...And You Will Know Us by the Trail of Dead (June 6, 2011)
- Clutch (June 8, 2011)
- Dredg (June 15, 2011)
- Yokozuna (September 28, 2011)
- Macaco Bong (October 1, 2011)
- Cabezones (October 5, 2011)
- Libra (October 7, 2011)
- The Dillinger Escape Plan (February 22, 28 and 29, 2012)
- Deftones (August 2–15, 2012 and August 27, 2013)
- Palms (July 29, 2013)
- Hawk Eyes (August 13 and 20, 21, 2013)
- Lacuna Coil (August 27, 2013)
