= Juan José Rithner =

Argentine footballer

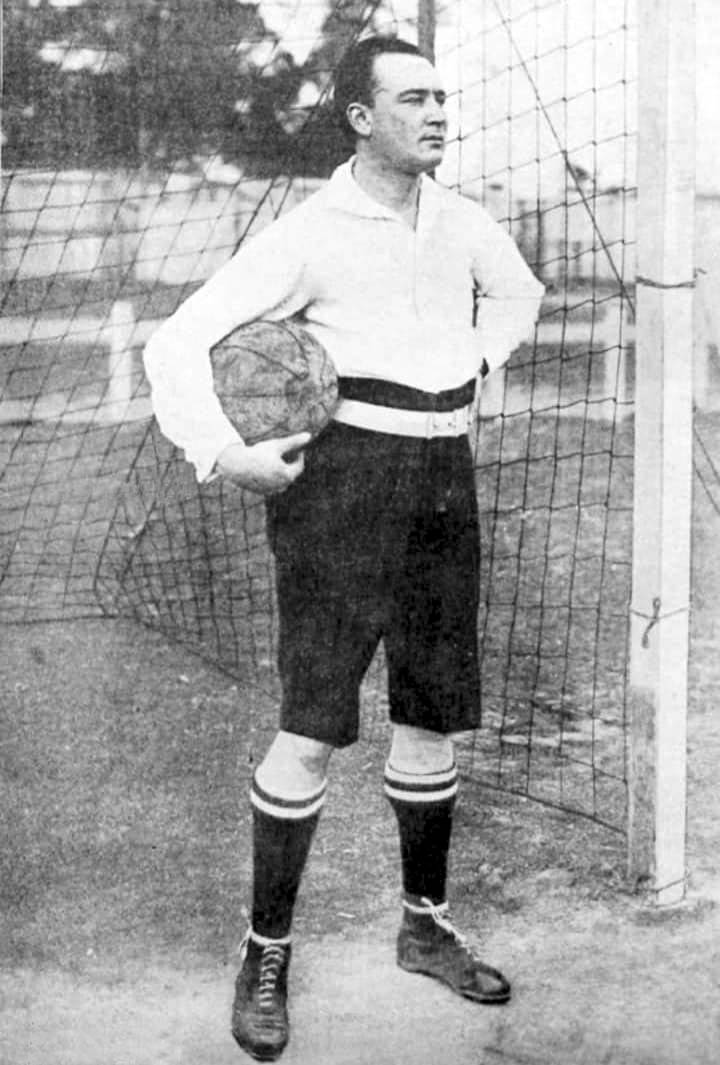

Personal information
- Date of birth: 5 January 1890
- Place of birth: Baradero, Argentina
- Date of death: August 23, 1960 (aged 70)
- Place of death: Buenos Aires, Argentina
- Position: Goalkeeper

Senior career*
Years	Team	Apps	(Gls)
1907–1919	Porteño		

International career
1910–1916	Argentina	14	(0)
Medal record
Men's football
Representing Argentina
South American Championship
Runner-up	1916 Argentina
- * Club domestic league appearances and goals

Juan José Rithner (5 January 1890 – 23 August 1960) was an Argentine footballer, who played as goalkeeper for Club Atlético Porteño and the Argentina national team.

With Porteño, Rithner won four titles, two Primera División championships and two national cups.

== Career ==
Rithner was born in Baradero, a town in Buenos Aires Province, son of a family of Irish roots. His career as a footballer in Primera División started at C.A. Porteño.

He played the 1911 Argentine Primera División playoff game against Alumni in 1911, which Porteño lost 2–1. In the following year, he was champion with Porteño.

His performances in Porteño earned him a place in the Argentina national team. On May 27, 1914, Rithner scored two goals against Uruguay in a match played in Córdoba, Argentina. He played in the first South American Championship (now Copa América), held in 1916.

After his retirement from football, in 1919 Rithner served as referee in a Copa Premier Honor Argentino match held in Estadio GEBA, where Argentina thrashed Uruguay 6–1.

=== Honours ===
Porteño

- Primera División (2): 1912, 1914
- Copa de Competencia Jockey Club (2): 1915, 1918
