= Estadio GEBA =

Multi-purpose stadium in Buenos Aires, Argentina

GEBA Stadium
- Estadio GEBA
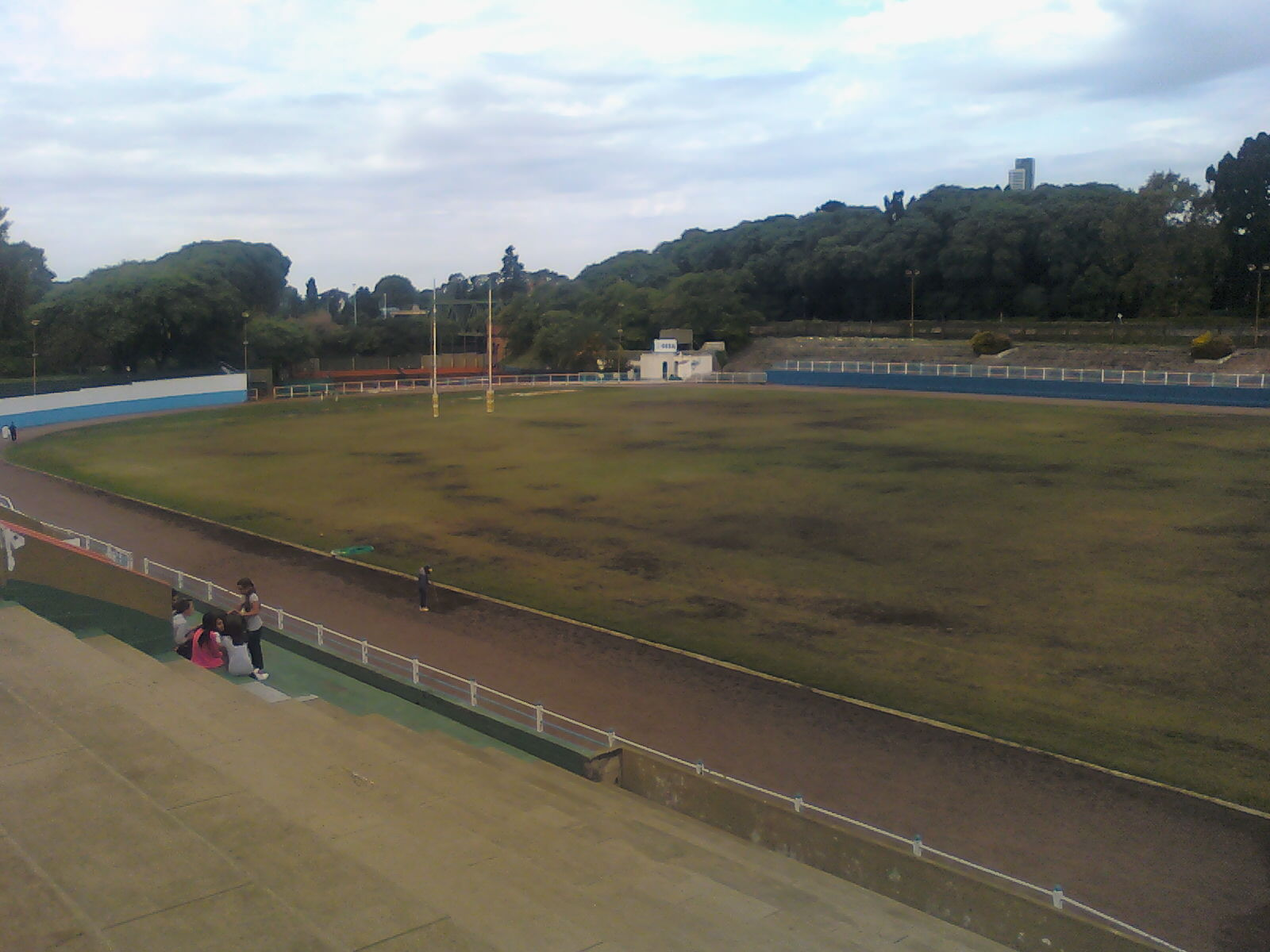
- Interior view of the stadium in 2008
- Interactive map of GEBA Stadium
- Full name: Estadio Gimnasia y Esgrima de Buenos Aires
- Location: Av. Marcelino Freyre 3831; Buenos Aires, Argentina
- Coordinates: 34°34′4″S 58°25′8″W
- Owner: Club Gimnasia y Esgrima
- Capacity: 12,133
- Surface: Grass
- Current use: Concerts

Construction
- Opened: 1902; 124 years ago
- Renovated: 1935

Tenants
- GEBA football (1906–?); GEBA rugby (1906–?); Argentina football team (1908–1919); Argentina rugby team (1925–1969)

The Estadio GEBA is a stadium located in the Palermo neighbourhood of Buenos Aires, Argentina. Owned by Club Gimnasia y Esgrima, the stadium is located on the "Sede Jorge Newbery", one of the three facilities of the club. Its current capacity is 12,133 spectators.

The stadium was the main football venue during the 1900s and 1910s, having held matches of the Argentina national team and some club matches during that period. The football team of the club (that played in Primera División from 1911 to 1917) also used the stadium for its home games. After the arson of 1916, the stadium was for a time used mainly for rugby union matches. Nowadays, Estadio GEBA is used for music concerts, having hosted many artists performing there.

== History ==
During its first years of existence, the club used facilities such as Sociedad Rural Argentina's La Rural venue in Palermo, where athletics competition were held. In 1900 the Municipality of Buenos Aires gave in concession to the club a land that had been used by the Buenos Aires and Rosario Railway (BA&RR). On 12 October 1902, Gimnasia y Esgrima inaugurated its field, built on that land. The field was also known as "Maldonado" due to its proximity to the homonymous stream.

The football team of the club affiliated to the Association (AFA) in 1906, promoting to Primera División in 1910. The stadium was a frequent venue for the squad during its years in Primera, from 1911 to 1917, the year the club disaffiliated from the Association. The GEBA stadium also hosted athletic competitions and rugby union matches, being often used by athletic teams of the University of Buenos Aires.

The Argentina national football team played in GEBA on 13 September 1908, for the Copa Newton v. Uruguay. That match has a historic relevance for being the first time Argentine wore the light blue and white striped jersey, which would be the definitive uniform up to present days. The stadium also hosted the matches where River Plate beat Racing Club by 2–1 before promoting to Primera División for the first time. In 1911, defunct team Alumni played its last game at GEBA on 26 November 1911, when the team beat Porteño by 2–1 winning its 10th. Primera División title. The club would not play any official match again, being dissolved two years later.

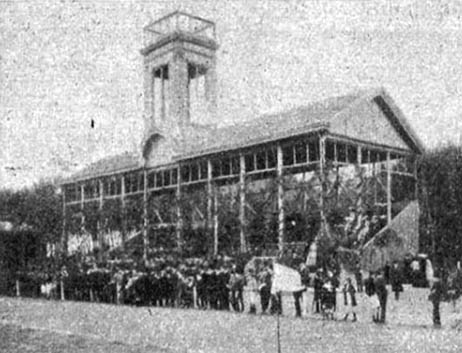
The stadium the day it was inaugurated, 1902

Due to the small dimensions of the field, spectators often placed under a BA&RR viaduct to watch the matches held in GEBA. The club took advantage of that and built a grandstand just below the viaduct, that was inaugurated in 1909 during a Copa Lipton match between Argentina and Uruguay national teams. Nevertheless, in 1910 the BA&RR dismantled the viaduct to move the tracks. It allowed the club to expand the lateral grandstand of the venue. The stadium was completely refurbished to hold the football matches of "Juegos Deportivos del Centenario", sport competitions in commemoration of the Argentince Centennial. A grandstand was built on the side next to the railway. On the side next to Río de la Plata, another one was built while the official grandstand was located on the Maldonado stream side. It consisted in a two-floor wooden structure, similar to the existing in the Hipódromo Argentino de Palermo. GEBA was also a frequent venue for Tie Cup, an international football club competition, since 1909.

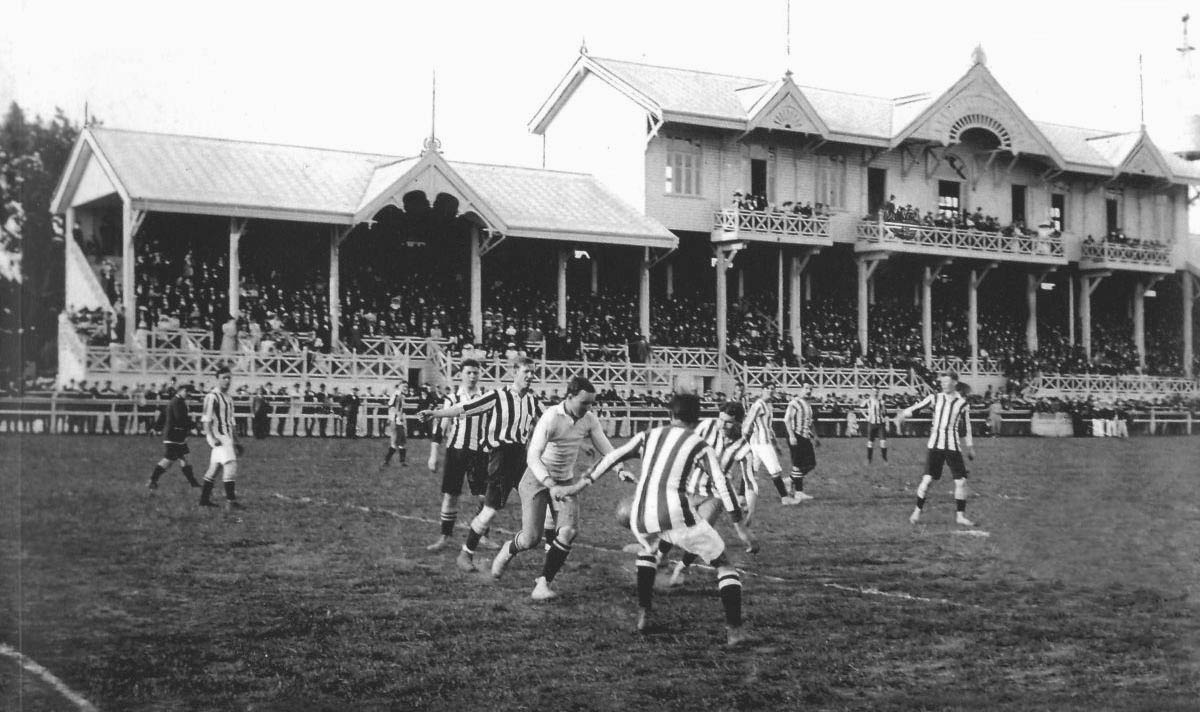
Alumni v Porteño, 1911 Primera División final at GEBA

The refurbished stadium hosted two matches of Copa Centenario Revolución de Mayo held in 1910 and considered a predecessor of current Copa América. In 1910, English club Swindon Town played in GEBA some matches during their tour on Argentina where the team also played San Isidro, Estudiantes de Buenos Aires and the Argentina national team. Legendary team Alumni played its last official game (the 1911 championship playoff vs. Porteño) at Gimnasia y Esgrima before being dissolved that same year. Even one of the Superclásico editions was played at GEBA, on 9 May 1915 for the Copa de Competencia Jockey Club.

GEBA also hosted all games of the first edition of Copa América, held in Buenos Aires in 1916. The final between Argentina and Uruguay was attended by more than 40,000 spectators that largely exceeded the capacity of the venue, calculated in 10,000. Because of that, the match had to be suspended. In disagreement with the decision, the angry crowd set fire to the stadium. The match had to be reprogrammed for the next day in the Racing Club stadium. The arson caused a large inactivity for the venue, which would not be reopened until 1918. The club did not rebuild the fired grandstands, replacing them with a running track

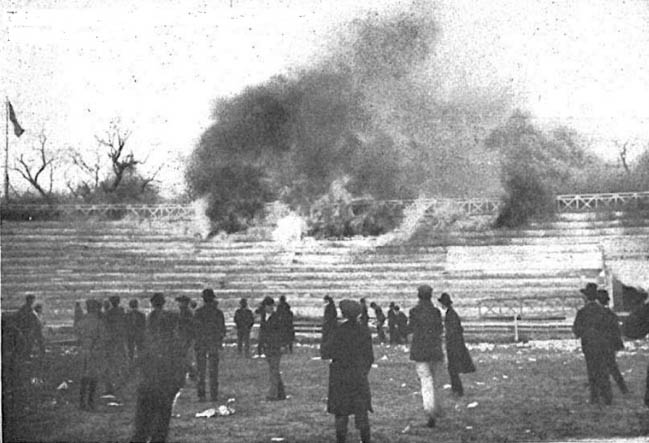
The crowd setting fire to the grandstands after the match v. Uruguay was suspended, July 1916

The Argentina national team played its last game at GEBA on 19 October 1919, when the squad won the Copa Premier Honor Argentino after thrashing Uruguay by 6–1, During the 1920s, the venue was still one of the biggest in Argentina, hosting some Primera División matches of both associations, AFA and AAmF. A match between AFA and AAmF was played at GEBA on 9 December 1924, as an attempt to reunify both associations, although it would not be carried out until 1926. The attendance was higher than expected, largely surpassing the capacity of the field. That was the last football match held in GEBA.

From 1925 on, the stadium mainly hosted rugby union matches. During 45 years it would be the most frequent venue for that sport, with the Argentina national team playing there its international games. In 1927, the stadium hosted its first international rugby match when Argentina played v the British Isles during their second visit to the country.

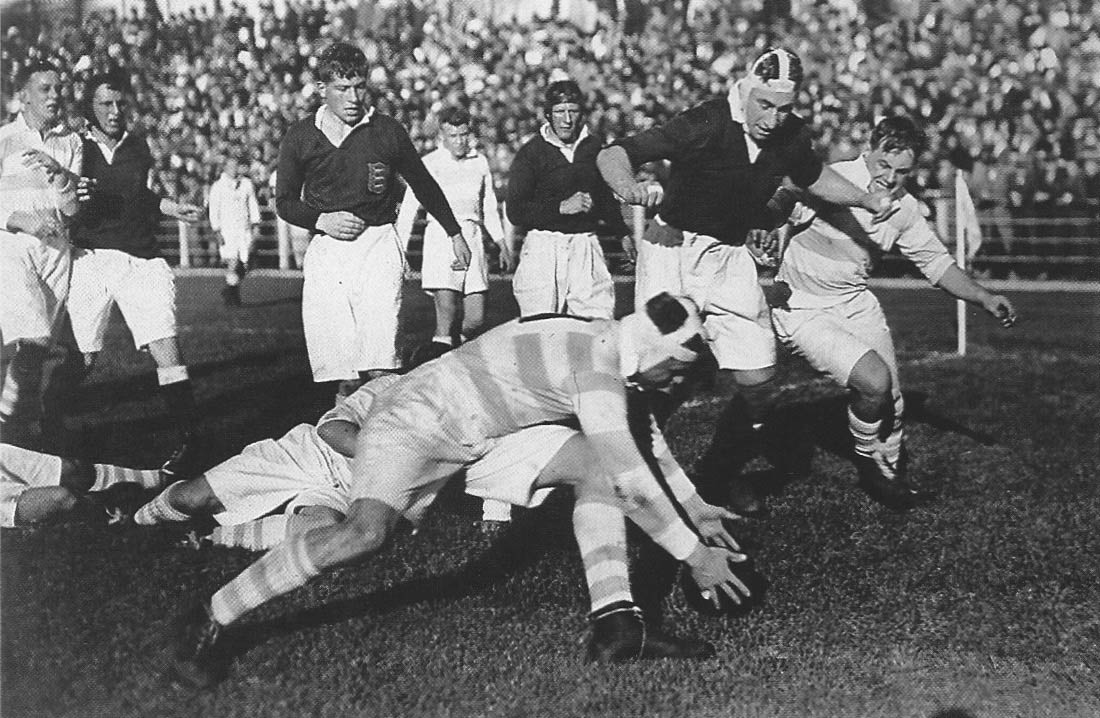
Argentina v British Lions at GEBA, 1936

In the middle 1930s, the stadium was completely refurbished, building new concrete grandstands. Once more, GEBA hosted an international rugby game when Argentina played v the British Lions during their third tour on the country in 1936.

In 1951, GEBA and Ferro Carril Oeste were the stadiums of the first South American Rugby Championship held in Buenos Aires. The 1969 Scotland tour on Argentina would be the last time the national team played their home matches at GEBA.

Since 1970, the Argentina national rugby team started using larger stadiums, such as Ferro Carril Oeste (1970–85) or Vélez Sársfield (since 1986). Nevertheless, the Estadio GEBA would continue hosting rugby union matches on some occasions, such as the 1993 South American Championship and some friendly matches that same year.

=== Tenants ===
Some teams that have played their home matches at Estadio GEBA are:

Team	Period
Gimnasia y Esgrima football team	c. 1906–1917
Gimnasia y Esgrima rugby team	c. 1906–?
Argentina national football team	1908–1919
Argentina national rugby team	1927–1969, 1993

=== Sporting events ===
Along its existence, the stadium has hosted several sports events, the following list compiles some of the most relevant:

==== Football ====
Event	Year/s
Copa Newton	1908, 1918
Copa Premier Honor Argentino	1908–1919
Tie Cup	1909, 1910, 1911, 1915, 1918
Copa Lipton	1909, 1911, 1915, 1919
Copa Centenario Revolución de Mayo	1910
Primera División Final (Note: GEBA hosted the Alumni v Porteño final, won by Alumni. The game has a historical relevance so it was the last official match of the legendary team, dissolved that same year.)	1911
Copa Roca	1914
Copa América	1916
Copa Aldao	1916, 1918
Copa Campeonato del Río de la Plata	1923

==== Rugby ====
Event	Year/s
British Lions tour	1927, 1936
France tour	1949, 1954, 1960
South American Championship	1951, 1993
South Africa tour (Note: Representative teams were Junior Springboks (1932) and "Gazzelles" (1966).)	1959, 1966
Wales tour	1968
Scotland tour	1969
Ireland tour	1952

=== Gallery ===
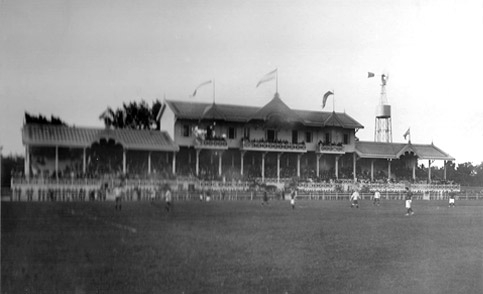
Official grandstand, 1902

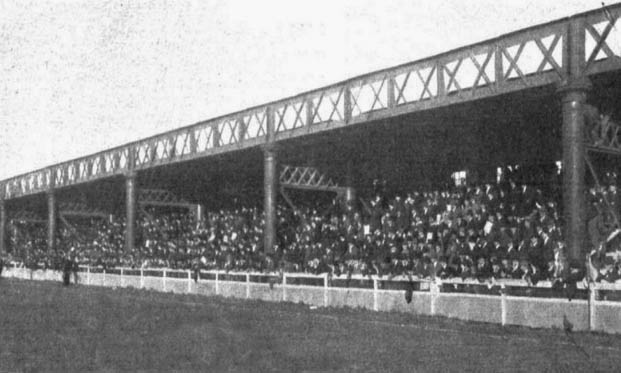
Grandstand built under a railway viaduct, 1909

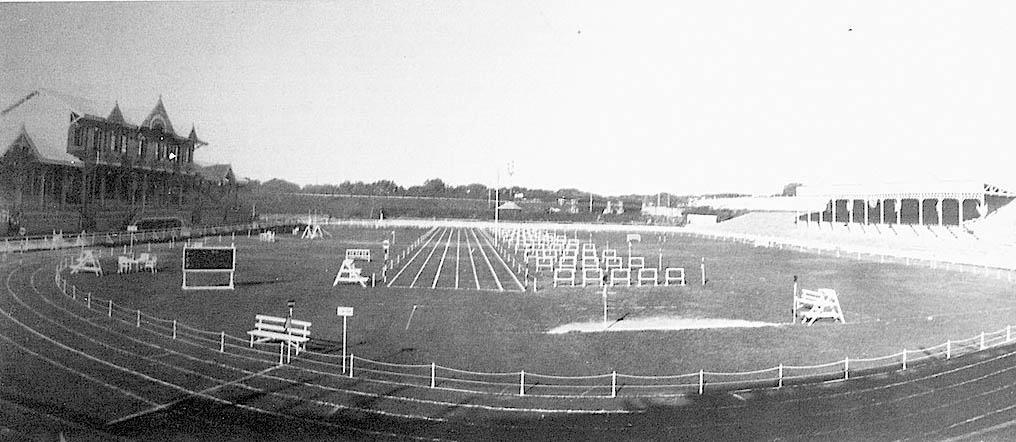
Running track built after the arson, c. 1920

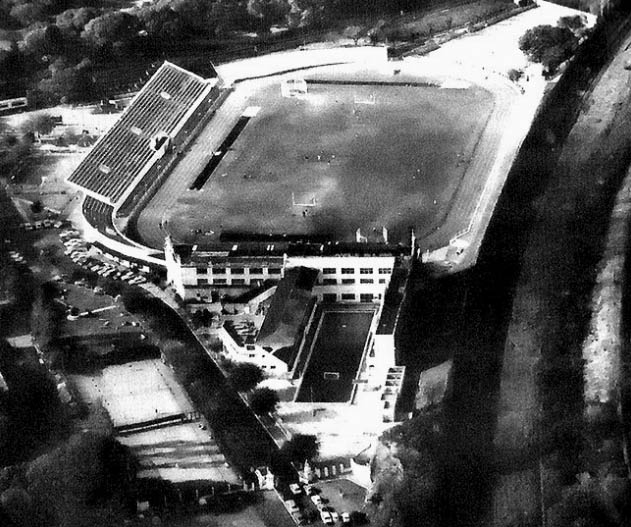
The stadium c. 1930s

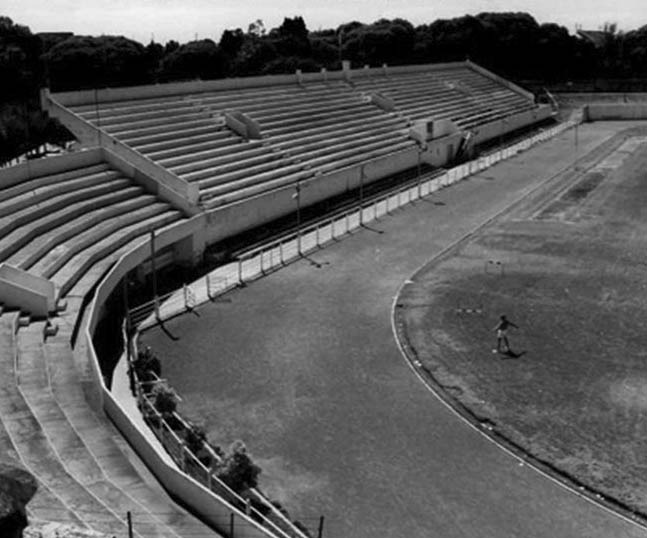
Concrete grandstand and track, c. 1935

== Music concerts ==
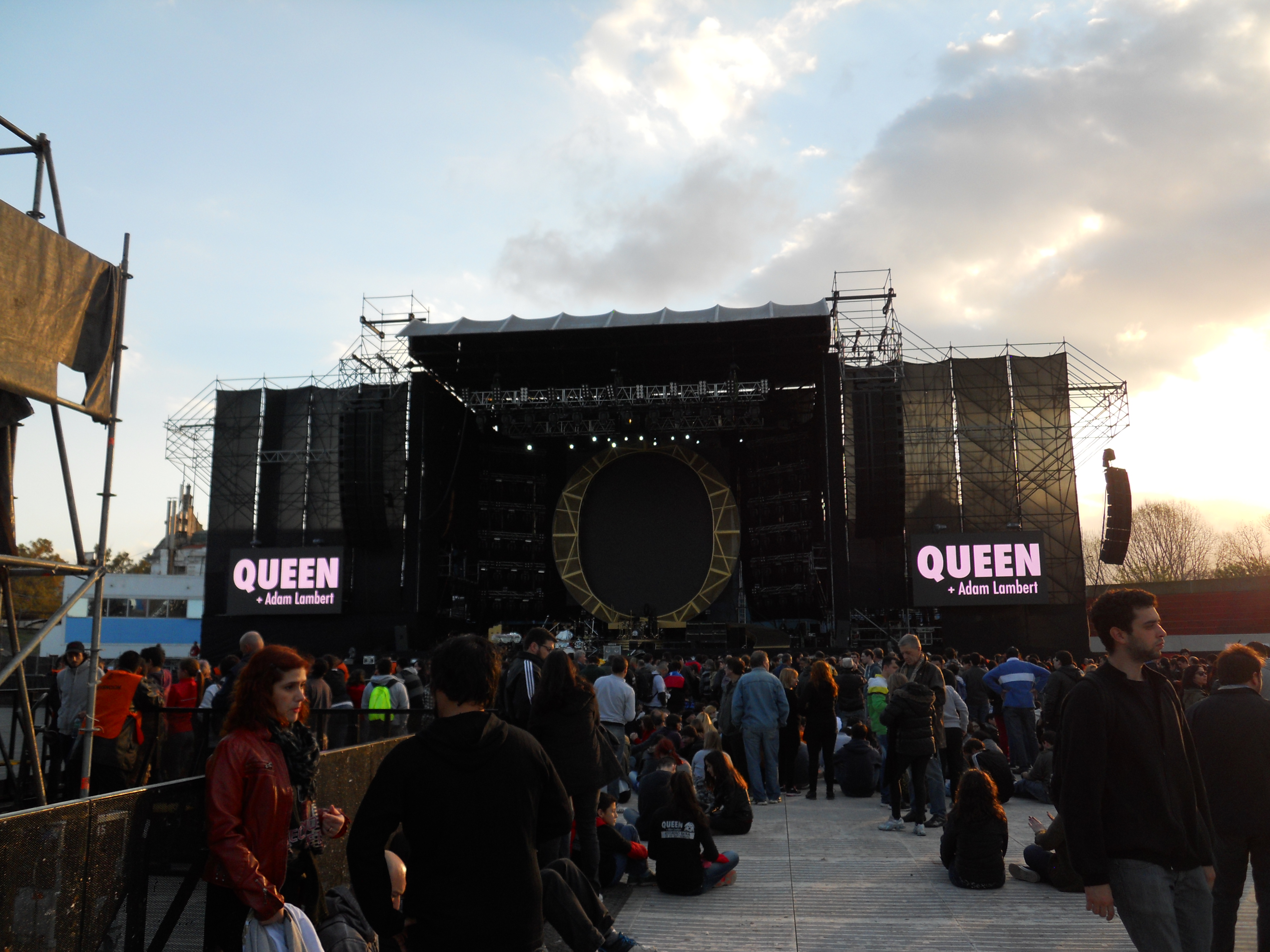
Queen + Adam Lambert stage at GEBA during their 2014–2015 tour

The club usually rents two of its facilities for concerts and events, being the Jorge Newbery facility the most used for those purposes.

Many international artists touring in Argentina have played at Estadio GEBA, being some of them: Ozzy Osbourne, Luis Miguel, Duran Duran, Rush, Peter Gabriel, System of a Down, Sepultura, INXS, Lenny Kravitz, Noel Gallagher, Rod Stewart, and Bruce Springsteen, among many others.

Concerts hosted at Estadio GEBA
Artist	Date/s	Tour	Ref.
Kylie Minogue	Nov 2008	KylieX2008	
Duran Duran	Nov 2008	The Red Carpet Massacre Tour	
Gloria Estefan	Abr 2009	90 Millas World Tour	
The Killers	Nov 2009, Mar 2013	Day & Age World Tour, Battle Born World Tour	
David Bisbal	Oct 2010	Sin Mirar Atrás	
The Black Eyed Peas	Nov 2010	The E.N.D. World Tour	
Rush	Oct 2010	Time Machine Tour	
Marc Anthony	Feb 2011, Sep 2018		
Jamiroquai	May 2011		
Peter Gabriel	Nov 2011	New Blood Tour	
Sepultura	Mar 2011		
Armin van Buuren	Abr 2011		
Snow Patrol	Sep 2011		
Primal Scream	Sep 2011		
System of a Down	Oct 2011	Reunion Tour	
Nick Jonas & The Administration	Jul 2011		
The Strokes	Nov 2011		
White Lies	Nov 2011		
Beady Eye	Nov 2011		
INXS	Nov 2011		
Sonic Youth	Nov 2011		
Lenny Kravitz	Oct 2011		
Broken Social Scene	Nov 2011		
Katy Perry	Sep 2011	California Dreams Tour	
Ozzy Osbourne	Mar 2011	Scream World Tour	
Selena Gomez	Feb 2012	We Own the Night Tour	
Luis Miguel	May 2012	Luis Miguel Tour	
Morrissey	Mar 2012		
Linkin Park	Oct 2012	Living Things World Tour	
Big Time Rush	Oct 2012	Big Time Summer Tour	
Jennifer Lopez	Jun 2012		
The Wanted	Oct 2012		
Noel Gallagher	May 2012		
Alicia Keys	Sep 2013		
Bruce Springsteen	Sep 2013	Wrecking Ball Tour	
Muse	Oct 2013	The 2nd Law World Tour	
Alejandro Sanz	Nov 2013		
Rod Stewart	Feb 2014		
Miley Cyrus	Oct 2014	Bangerz Tour	
Queen + Adam Lambert	Sep 2015	2014–15	
Laura Pausini	Sep 2016	Stadi Tour	
Juan Luis Guerra	Mar 2017	Todo Tiene su Hora Tour	
Enrique Iglesias	Abr 2018	Enrique Iglesias Live	

Preceded by (none)	Copa América; 1916	Succeeded by Parque Pereira; Montevideo
Preceded by (none)	South American Rugby; Championship; 1951	Succeeded by (various)
Preceded by (various)	South American Rugby; Championship; 1993	Succeeded by (various)
