= 1912 Argentine Primera División =

21st season of top-tier football league in Argentina

Primera División
- Season: 1912
- Dates: 14 April – 23 December
- Champions: Quilmes (AFA); Porteño (FAF)

The 1912 Argentine Primera División was the 21st season of top-flight football in Argentina. Two tournaments were held at the same time, due to the establishment of Federación Argentina de Football (FAF), a dissident association which organised its own championship. Thus, Quilmes won the official AFA tournament, while Porteño won the FAF title.

The AFA season began on April 14 and ended on December 13 while the FAF season began on July 11 and ended on December 23.

== Asociación Argentina de Football – Copa Campeonato ==
Primera División (AFA)
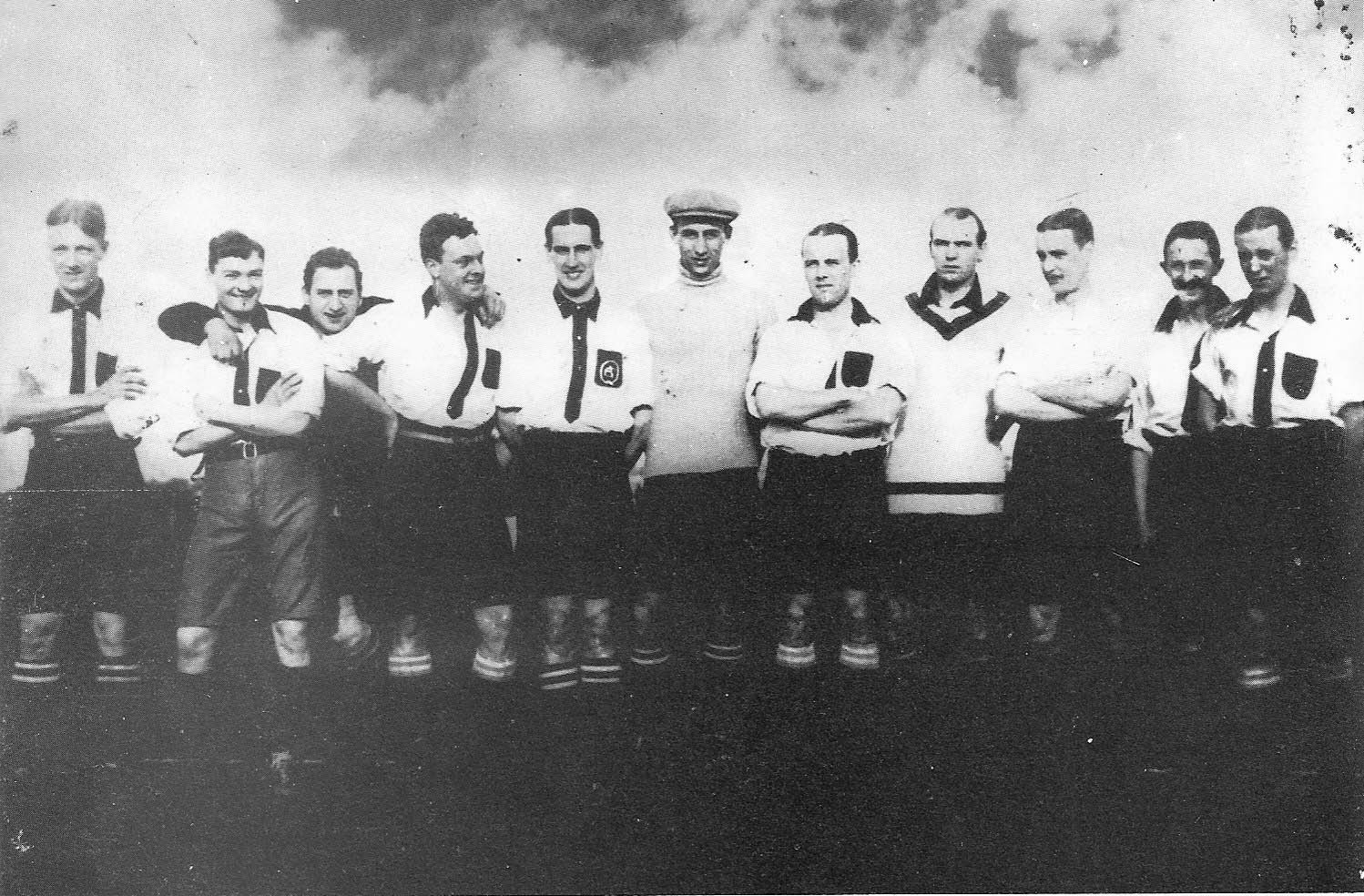
- Quilmes A.C., AFA champion
- Season: 1912
- Dates: 14 April – 13 December
- Champions: Quilmes (1st title)
- Promoted: Estudiantes (LP)
- Relegated: (none)
- Top goalscorer: (Argentina) Alberto Ohaco (Racing) (10 goals)
- Biggest home win: Quilmes 11–0 San Isidro
- Biggest away win: Belgrano A.C. 0–6 Racing

Many former players of Alumni (dissolved one year later) went to play for Quilmes, which would be the champion. The tournament had no relegations. Estudiantes (LP) (promoted) added to the championship.

Pos	Team	Pld	W	D	L	GF	GA	GD	Pts
1	Quilmes (C)	10	7	1	2	24	8	+16	15
2	San Isidro	9	5	1	3	16	22	−6	11
3	Racing	10	4	2	4	24	16	+8	10
4	Estudiantes (BA)	9	4	0	5	15	18	−3	8
5	Belgrano AC	10	3	1	6	20	20	0	7
6	River Plate	10	3	1	6	8	23	−15	7

(C) Champions

== Federación Argentina de Football ==
Primera División (FAF)
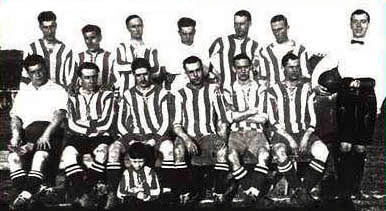
- Porteño, FAF champion
- Season: 1912
- Dates: 14 July – 23 December
- Champions: Porteño (1st title)
- Promoted: Argentino (Q); Atlanta; Independiente; Kimberley
- Relegated: (none)
- Top goalscorer: (Argentina) Ernesto Colla (Independiente) (12 goals)
- Biggest home win: Kimberley 1–7 Independiente
- Biggest away win: Argentino de Quilmes 7–1 Kimberley

In July 1912, Gimnasia y Esgrima de Buenos Aires disaffiliated from Asociación Argentina de Football, founding the Federación Argentina de Football (FAF) presided by Ricardo Aldao. Recently promoted teams Porteño and Estudiantes (LP) joined the new league, among other clubs.

1912 was the inaugural season of the dissident FAF league. This tournament was formed by 3 dissident teams from the Asociación Argentina (AAF): Estudiantes de La Plata, Gimnasia y Esgrima (BA) and Porteño, plus the 4 teams promoted from the second division: Argentino de Quilmes, Atlanta, Independiente and Kimberley. The last club added was the recently created Sociedad Sportiva Argentina.

Pos	Team	Pld	W	D	L	GF	GA	GD	Pts
1	Independiente	14	9	2	3	33	12	+21	20 (Note: Independiente led the championship by goal average after beating a weakened Argentino de Quilmes team 5–0 in the final round. Nevertheless, the club offered to play Porteño (which had finished equaled on points with Independiente) a playoff to avoid criticism.)
2	Porteño	14	8	4	2	24	10	+14	20
3	Estudiantes (LP)	14	8	3	3	23	14	+9	19
4	Gimnasia y Esgrima (BA)	14	7	4	3	26	18	+8	18
5	Argentino (Q)	14	7	3	4	34	27	+7	17
6	Atlanta	14	6	0	8	24	28	−4	12
7	Kimberley	14	2	2	10	17	48	−31	6
8	Sociedad Sportiva Argentina	14	0	0	14	6	30	−24	0

=== Championship playoff ===
Independiente and Porteño finished level on points at the top of the table, necessitating a championship playoff. The game was suspended at 87' after the Independiente players abandoned the pitch in protest at a disallowed goal by referee Carlos Aertz. The championship was then awarded to Porteño.

Date	Team 1	Res.	Team 2	Venue	City
23 Dec	Porteño	1–1 (Note: Title awarded to Porteño after Independiente players left the field in protest.)	Independiente	Estadio GEBA	Buenos Aires
