= Club Atlético Porteño =

(Argentina) Porteño
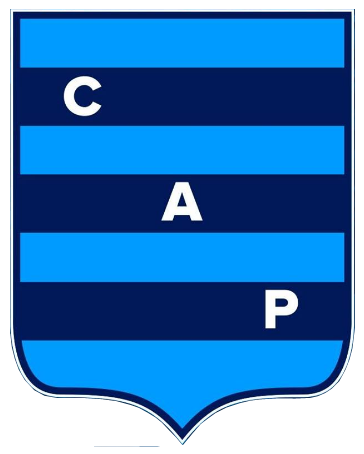
- Full name: Club Atlético Porteño
- Union: URBA
- Nickname: Teño
- Founded: 28 July 1895; 130 years ago
- Location: San Vicente, Argentina
- Ground(s): Magallanes y Pardo, San Vicente
- President: Marcelo Raso
- League: URBA Tercera
- 2025: 9th.
Team kit

Club Atlético Porteño is an Argentine rugby union club sited in San Vicente, Buenos Aires. The club was founded on July 28, 1895, by Irish immigrants as a football team, which participated in tournaments organized by the Argentine Football Association until 1931 when the sport became professional in Argentina.

The senior squad plays in Tercera, the sixth division of the URBA league system. Porteño also has a women's rugby section. The club has also a women's rugby team competing in "Torneo Femenino", organised by the same body.

The club has 5,000 members, including youth and women's rugby.

== History ==
=== The beginning ===
In 1895 Cavanagh, Geogeham, Kenny and O'Farrel were just a group of boys who wanted to form a football team, but they had no money. On July 28, 1895, they met in the Hipódromo Argentino de Palermo and founded the "Club Atlético Capital" designing Tomas Hagan as president. A few months later, those immigrants bet the money they had saved to a horse called Porteño, which finally won the race paying a hugh amount of money.

With the money won in the race, the boys bought the equipment necessary to play football: balls, jerseys, shorts, socks and shoes and they renamed the club as a tribute to that horse, so "Club Atlético Porteño" was the name chosen.

=== The football years (1907–31) ===
Porteño was the first football club to obtain municipal lands in Parque Tres de Febrero in 1900. Evicted ten years later, it obtained another land in 1913 and a large municipal subsidy. In 1915, it inaugurated a new playing field (Avenida de los Paraísos and Valentín Alsina) and built the first concrete grandstand in the city. He was a First Division champion in 1912 and 1914, and a Copa Competencia champion in 1915 and 1918. He also played a key role in Alumni's final match (the 1911 final).

The football team debuted in the top division, Primera División, in 1907, where it played until 1928 when the club was relegated to Segunda División.

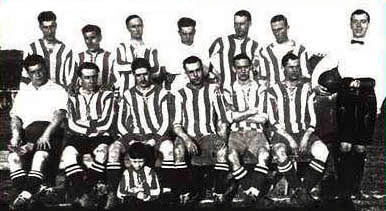
The football team that won its first Primera División title in 1912

The first Porteño stadium was located on Alvear (current Del Libertador) avenue and Godoy Cruz in Palermo. Nevertheless, the National Government expropriated the land to build the "Industrial Pavilion" there, as part of the celebrations of the 100th. anniversary of the May Revolution in 1910. Porteño moved to a land on Valentín Alsina avenue, near Hipódromo Argentino, also in Palermo. Its stadium was the first (in the city of Buenos Aires) to have its official stands built in concrete. In 1931 Porteño disaffiliated from the Football Association, due to the club refused to participate in a professional league, being the team subsequently disbanded.

Video of a Estudiantes BA v Porteño match in 1915

Porteño's football team won a total of 2 championships between 1912 and 1914 and two Copa de Competencia Jockey Club, in 1915 and 1918.

Porteño was relegated in 1928, and the club disaffiliated from AFA in 1931.

=== The rise of rugby ===
Although the football team was disbanded, Porteño kept other sports active, such as rugby union, which is currently practised at the club facilities located in San Vicente. The reason why Porteño went off football was that the club wanted to keep as amateur, and rugby union is not a professional sport in Argentina.

Porteño affiliated to Unión de Rugby del Río de la Plata in 1932. The team debuted that season in the third division, finishing 6th. In 1935 Porteño promoted to the second division and in 1939 the team won the first division championship organized by the Federación Católica Argentina de Rugby.

In 1944 the Government of the City of Buenos Aires notified Porteño it had to leave its lands in Palermo, which were finally expropriated in 1945.

In 1951 Porteño won the long-awaited promotion to Primera División, but the team remained there just one season so the following year was relegated after losing its match at the hands of Estudiantes de Paraná.

After playing in different fields, the club finally could acquire a land located in Magallanes and Pardo streets of San Vicente in 1971. Porteño still has its facilities there. The same year the club formed its first women's field hockey team, which has been developing as years went by.

== Venues ==
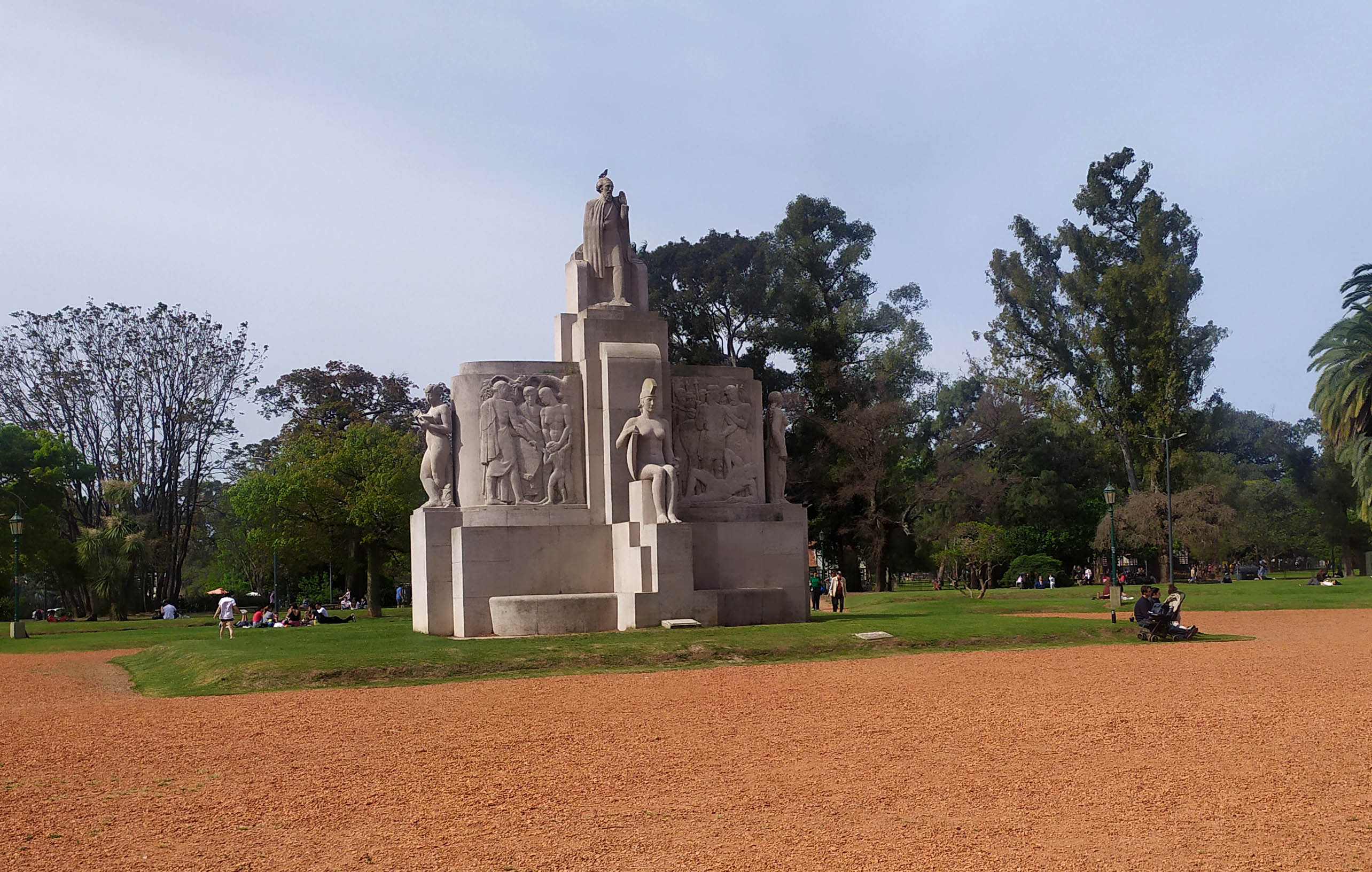
Porteño had its first stadium on this part of Parque 3 de Febrero

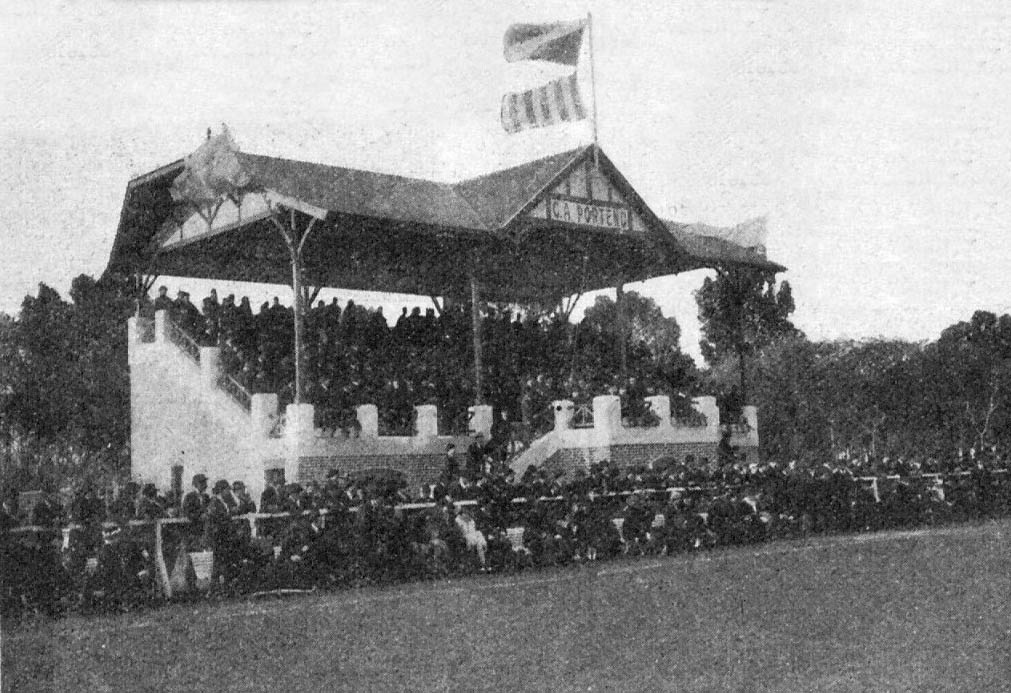
Official grandstand of Porteño's second venue in 1915

Porteño's first stadium was located on Parque 3 de Febrero in Palermo, Buenos Aires, more precisely on Av. Alvear (now Avenida del Libertador) and Godoy Cruz, where the club established in 1901. Nevertheless, in 1909 Porteño and Club Atlético Estudiantes (which had its stadium along with Porteño's) evicted from there and the stadiums demolished to build the industrial pavilion for an exhibition that took part as part of the Centennial of Argentina celebrations of 1910.

The club then rented a field in the same neighborhood, on a land located next to Hipódromo Argentino and the Golf station (nowadays "Lisandro de la Torre" station) of Central Argentine Railway. The field was also known as the Golf. The club remained there until 1945.

Porteño then established its headquarters in the city of San Vicente in Buenos Aires Province, where it has remained since 1971.

== Colors ==
While the football team colors were blue and white in vertical stripes, it is said that rugby jersey adopted its colors in the 1930s, when a group of players of Sportive Francaise joined Porteño to play for the club. Club Porteño members, in recognition of this gesture, designed the shirt combining the light blue color from the flag of Argentina, and the french blue from France's.

Football 1907–31	Rugby 1931–today

== Notable players ==
- Juan José Rithner (1907–19), also goalkeeper of Argentina. Played 200 matches for the club, scoring 11 goals.

== Honours ==
=== League ===
- Primera División (2): 1912 FAF, 1914 FAF

==== National cups ====
- Copa de Competencia Jockey Club (2): 1915, 1918
- Copa Bullrich (1): 1906 (Note: The Copa Bullrich was an official football competition contested by clubs playing in the Second Division. The AFA has not included this competition into the list of national cups because only teams in Primera División participated in those competitions.)
